= List of teams and cyclists in the 2011 Vuelta a España =

These are the 22 teams and 198 cyclists who participated in the 2011 Vuelta a España, which started on August 20 and finished on September 11:

Legend
No.	Starting number worn by the rider during the Vuelta	Pos.	Position in the general classification
HD	Denotes a rider finished outside the time limit, followed by the stage in which they did so	DNS	Denotes a rider who did not start, followed by the stage before which they withdrew
DNF	Denotes a rider who did not finish, followed by the stage in which they withdrew	DSQ	Denotes a rider who was disqualified, followed by the stage in which they were withdrawn

No.	Rider	Team	Position
1	(Italy) Vincenzo Nibali	Liquigas–Cannondale	7
2	(Italy) Eros Capecchi	Liquigas–Cannondale	21
3	(Italy) Damiano Caruso	Liquigas–Cannondale	74
4	(Italy) Mauro Da Dalto	Liquigas–Cannondale	147
5	(Italy) Alan Marangoni	Liquigas–Cannondale	138
6	(Germany) Dominik Nerz	Liquigas–Cannondale	38
7	(Slovakia) Peter Sagan	Liquigas–Cannondale	121
8	(Italy) Valerio Agnoli	Liquigas–Cannondale	105
9	(Italy) Francesco Bellotti	Liquigas–Cannondale	109
11	(Republic of Ireland) Nicolas Roche	Ag2r–La Mondiale	16
12	(France) Guillaume Bonnafond	Ag2r–La Mondiale	26
13	(France) Dimitri Champion	Ag2r–La Mondiale	95
14	(France) Cyril Dessel	Ag2r–La Mondiale	60
15	(France) Steve Houanard	Ag2r–La Mondiale	133
16	(France) David Lelay	Ag2r–La Mondiale	51
17	(France) Lloyd Mondory	Ag2r–La Mondiale	84
18	(Italy) Matteo Montaguti	Ag2r–La Mondiale	76
19	(France) Mathieu Perget	Ag2r–La Mondiale	24
21	(Spain) David Bernabéu	Andalucía–Caja Granada	90
22	(Spain) José Alberto Benítez	Andalucía–Caja Granada	130
23	(Spain) Antonio Cabello	Andalucía–Caja Granada	165
24	(Spain) Juan José Lobato	Andalucía–Caja Granada	DNF-11
25	(Spain) Adrián Palomares	Andalucía–Caja Granada	114
26	(Spain) Antonio Piedra	Andalucía–Caja Granada	72
27	(Spain) José Luis Roldán	Andalucía–Caja Granada	98
28	(Spain) Jesús Rosendo	Andalucía–Caja Granada	99
29	(Spain) José Vicente Toribio	Andalucía–Caja Granada	134
31	(Switzerland) Mathias Frank	BMC Racing Team	94
32	(Switzerland) Martin Kohler	BMC Racing Team	111
33	(United States) Taylor Phinney	BMC Racing Team	DNF-13
34	(Italy) Manuel Quinziato	BMC Racing Team	131
35	(Italy) Mauro Santambrogio	BMC Racing Team	88
36	(Italy) Ivan Santaromita	BMC Racing Team	117
37	(Switzerland) Johann Tschopp	BMC Racing Team	DNF-6
38	(Belgium) Greg Van Avermaet	BMC Racing Team	83
39	(Netherlands) Karsten Kroon	BMC Racing Team	DNF-14
41	(France) Yohann Bagot	Cofidis	116
42	(France) Nicolas Edet	Cofidis	DNF-8
43	(Spain) Luis Ángel Maté	Cofidis	63
44	(France) David Moncoutié	Cofidis	37
45	(Latvia) Aleksejs Saramotins	Cofidis	166
46	(Belgium) Nico Sijmens	Cofidis	73
47	(Estonia) Rein Taaramäe	Cofidis	DNF-17
48	(France) Nicolas Vogondy	Cofidis	DNF-6
49	(France) Julien Fouchard	Cofidis	137
51	(Spain) Igor Antón	Euskaltel–Euskadi	33
52	(Spain) Iñaki Isasi	Euskaltel–Euskadi	71
53	(Spain) Egoi Martínez	Euskaltel–Euskadi	55
54	(Spain) Mikel Nieve	Euskaltel–Euskadi	10
55	(Spain) Juan José Oroz	Euskaltel–Euskadi	50
56	(Spain) Amets Txurruka	Euskaltel–Euskadi	30
57	(Spain) Gorka Verdugo	Euskaltel–Euskadi	36
58	(Spain) Jorge Azanza	Euskaltel–Euskadi	97
59	(France) Pierre Cazaux	Euskaltel–Euskadi	148
61	(Spain) Juan José Cobo	Geox–TMC	DSQ
62	(Spain) David Blanco	Geox–TMC	47
63	(Spain) David de la Fuente	Geox–TMC	35
64	(Colombia) Fabio Duarte	Geox–TMC	39
65	(Russia) Denis Menchov	Geox–TMC	5
66	(Spain) Carlos Sastre	Geox–TMC	20
67	(Colombia) Mauricio Ardila	Geox–TMC	DNF-5
68	(Austria) Matthias Brändle	Geox–TMC	155
69	(Russia) Dmitry Kozonchuk	Geox–TMC	122
71	(Switzerland) Michael Albasini	HTC–Highroad	123
72	(United Kingdom) Mark Cavendish	HTC–Highroad	DNF-4
73	(Germany) John Degenkolb	HTC–Highroad	144
74	(Australia) Matthew Goss	HTC–Highroad	DNF-2
75	(Germany) Bert Grabsch	HTC–Highroad	136
76	(Australia) Leigh Howard	HTC–Highroad	152
77	(Germany) Tony Martin	HTC–Highroad	DNS-19
78	(Belarus) Kanstantsin Sivtsov	HTC–Highroad	DNF-11
79	(Slovakia) Martin Velits	HTC–Highroad	125
81	(Spain) Joaquim Rodríguez	Team Katusha	19
82	(Spain) Joan Horrach	Team Katusha	67
83	(Belarus) Aleksandr Kuschynski	Team Katusha	143
84	(Spain) Alberto Losada	Team Katusha	46
85	(Spain) Daniel Moreno	Team Katusha	9
86	(Italy) Luca Paolini	Team Katusha	135
87	(Russia) Vladimir Karpets	Team Katusha	42
88	(Russia) Yuri Trofimov	Team Katusha	124
89	(Russia) Eduard Vorganov	Team Katusha	43
91	(Italy) Michele Scarponi	Lampre–ISD	DNF-14
92	(Italy) Marco Marzano	Lampre–ISD	61
93	(Italy) Manuele Mori	Lampre–ISD	107
94	(Poland) Przemysław Niemiec	Lampre–ISD	54
95	(Spain) Aitor Pérez	Lampre–ISD	106
96	(Italy) Alessandro Petacchi	Lampre–ISD	100
97	(Italy) Daniele Righi	Lampre–ISD	141
98	(Italy) Alessandro Spezialetti	Lampre–ISD	DNF-16
99	(Italy) Francesco Gavazzi	Lampre–ISD	58
101	(Italy) Daniele Bennati	Leopard Trek	112
102	(Switzerland) Fabian Cancellara	Leopard Trek	DNS-17
103	(Denmark) Jakob Fuglsang	Leopard Trek	11
104	(Belgium) Maxime Monfort	Leopard Trek	6
105	(Australia) Stuart O'Grady	Leopard Trek	93
106	(Italy) Davide Viganò	Leopard Trek	142
107	(Germany) Robert Wagner	Leopard Trek	162
108	(Switzerland) Oliver Zaugg	Leopard Trek	DNS-18
109	(Austria) Thomas Rohregger	Leopard Trek	28
111	(Spain) Imanol Erviti	Movistar Team	126
112	(Spain) José Vicente Garcia	Movistar Team	DNF-5
113	(Spain) Beñat Intxausti	Movistar Team	86
114	(Lithuania) Ignatas Konovalovas	Movistar Team	DNF-17
115	(Spain) Pablo Lastras	Movistar Team	44
116	(Spain) David López	Movistar Team	DNF-17
117	(Spain) Sergio Pardilla	Movistar Team	DNF-17
118	(Italy) Marzio Bruseghin	Movistar Team	14
119	(Spain) Angel Madrazo	Movistar Team	DNF-18
121	(Belgium) Jan Bakelants	Omega Pharma–Lotto	31
122	(Belgium) Francis De Greef	Omega Pharma–Lotto	29
123	(Belgium) Gert Dockx	Omega Pharma–Lotto	92
124	(Australia) Adam Hansen	Omega Pharma–Lotto	129
125	(Spain) Vicente Reynés	Omega Pharma–Lotto	87
126	(Belgium) Jurgen Van de Walle	Omega Pharma–Lotto	127
127	(Belgium) Jurgen Van den Broeck	Omega Pharma–Lotto	8
128	(Belgium) Olivier Kaisen	Omega Pharma–Lotto	62
129	(Germany) Sebastian Lang	Omega Pharma–Lotto	77
131	(Sweden) Fredrik Kessiakoff	Astana	34
132	(Italy) Enrico Gasparotto	Astana	78
133	(Estonia) Tanel Kangert	Astana	64
134	(Kazakhstan) Andrei Kashechkin	Astana	89
135	(Croatia) Robert Kišerlovski	Astana	18
136	(Kazakhstan) Andrey Mizourov	Astana	59
137	(Russia) Evgeny Petrov	Astana	65
138	(Kazakhstan) Alexsandr Dyachenko	Astana	102
139	(Spain) Josep Jufré	Astana	57
141	(Belgium) Tom Boonen	Quick-Step	DNS-16
142	(Italy) Dario Cataldo	Quick-Step	132
143	(France) Sylvain Chavanel	Quick-Step	27
144	(Netherlands) Marc de Maar	Quick-Step	82
145	(Belgium) Kevin De Weert	Quick-Step	91
146	(Belgium) Nikolas Maes	Quick-Step	151
147	(Italy) Davide Malacarne	Quick-Step	56
148	(Belgium) Kevin Seeldraeyers	Quick-Step	23
149	(Belgium) Kristof Vandewalle	Quick-Step	104
151	(Spain) Carlos Barredo	Rabobank	45
152	(Denmark) Matti Breschel	Rabobank	DNF-6
153	(Spain) Óscar Freire	Rabobank	DNF-8
154	(Spain) Juan Manuel Gárate	Rabobank	66
155	(Netherlands) Steven Kruijswijk	Rabobank	41
156	(Germany) Paul Martens	Rabobank	119
157	(Netherlands) Bauke Mollema	Rabobank	3
158	(Spain) Luis León Sánchez	Rabobank	53
159	(Netherlands) Tom-Jelte Slagter	Rabobank	75
161	(Denmark) Chris Anker Sørensen	Saxo Bank–SunGard	12
162	(Denmark) Mads Christensen	Saxo Bank–SunGard	160
163	(Ukraine) Volodymir Gustov	Saxo Bank–SunGard	81
164	(Argentina) Juan José Haedo	Saxo Bank–SunGard	157
165	(Denmark) Jonas Aaen Jørgensen	Saxo Bank–SunGard	139
166	(Poland) Rafał Majka	Saxo Bank–SunGard	DNS-17
167	(Poland) Jarosław Marycz	Saxo Bank–SunGard	149
168	(Belgium) Nick Nuyens	Saxo Bank–SunGard	161
169	(Denmark) Nicki Sørensen	Saxo Bank–SunGard	120
171	(France) Alexandre Geniez	Skil–Shimano	159
172	(Japan) Yukihiro Doi	Skil–Shimano	150
173	(Germany) Johannes Fröhlinger	Skil–Shimano	49
174	(Germany) Simon Geschke	Skil–Shimano	115
175	(Germany) Marcel Kittel	Skil–Shimano	DNS-13
176	(Netherlands) Albert Timmer	Skil–Shimano	164
177	(Netherlands) Tom Veelers	Skil–Shimano	167
178	(Netherlands) Roy Curvers	Skil–Shimano	156
179	(Netherlands) Koen de Kort	Skil–Shimano	68
181	(Norway) Kurt Asle Arvesen	Team Sky	DNF-6
182	(Italy) Dario Cioni	Team Sky	145
183	(United Kingdom) Chris Froome	Team Sky	1
184	(Sweden) Thomas Löfkvist	Team Sky	52
185	(Italy) Morris Possoni	Team Sky	80
186	(United Kingdom) Ian Stannard	Team Sky	128
187	(Australia) Christopher Sutton	Team Sky	163
188	(United Kingdom) Bradley Wiggins	Team Sky	2
189	(Spain) Xabier Zandio	Team Sky	69
191	(United States) Tyler Farrar	Garmin–Cervélo	DNF-8
192	(Brazil) Murilo Fischer	Garmin–Cervélo	DNS-9
193	(Australia) Heinrich Haussler	Garmin–Cervélo	103
194	(Germany) Andreas Klier	Garmin–Cervélo	158
195	(France) Christophe Le Mével	Garmin–Cervélo	40
196	(Republic of Ireland) Dan Martin	Garmin–Cervélo	13
197	(United States) Andrew Talansky	Garmin–Cervélo	79
198	(Belgium) Johan Vansummeren	Garmin–Cervélo	70
199	(Belgium) Sep Vanmarcke	Garmin–Cervélo	140
201	(Slovenia) Janez Brajkovič	Team RadioShack	22
202	(United States) Matthew Busche	Team RadioShack	113
203	(Spain) Markel Irizar	Team RadioShack	96
204	(Germany) Andreas Klöden	Team RadioShack	DNF-13
205	(France) Geoffroy Lequatre	Team RadioShack	110
206	(Portugal) Tiago Machado	Team RadioShack	32
207	(Portugal) Nelson Oliveira	Team RadioShack	118
208	(Portugal) Sérgio Paulinho	Team RadioShack	85
209	(Spain) Haimar Zubeldia	Team RadioShack	25
211	(Italy) Matteo Carrara	Vacansoleil–DCM	146
212	(Belgium) Stijn Devolder	Vacansoleil–DCM	154
213	(Poland) Michał Gołaś	Vacansoleil–DCM	DNS-8
214	(Netherlands) Martijn Keizer	Vacansoleil–DCM	153
215	(Uzbekistan) Sergey Lagutin	Vacansoleil–DCM	15
216	(Netherlands) Pim Ligthart	Vacansoleil–DCM	108
217	(Netherlands) Wout Poels	Vacansoleil–DCM	17
218	(Italy) Santo Anzà	Vacansoleil–DCM	48
219	(Ukraine) Ruslan Pidgornyy	Vacansoleil–DCM	101

== See also ==
- Vuelta a España 2011
