= 2011 Vuelta a España, Stage 1 to Stage 11 =

Cycling race stages

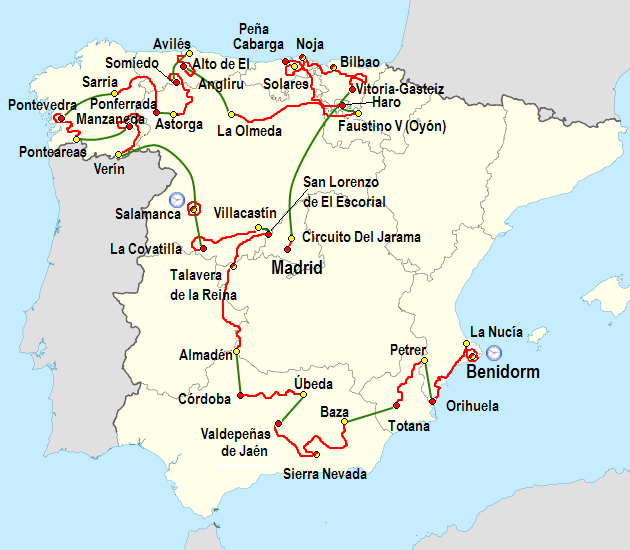
Route of the 2011 Vuelta a España

These are the profiles for the individual stages in the 2011 Vuelta a España, with Stage 1 on 20 August, and Stage 11 on 31 August.

Legend (Note: Jerseys appearing in the table on the left of the page indicate those worn by the cyclist during the particular stage, while those appearing in the table on the right of the page indicate those awarded to the cyclist after the stage.)
A red jersey	Denotes the leader of the General classification	A bluedotted jersey	Denotes the leader of the Mountains classification
A green jersey	Denotes the leader of the Points classification	A white jersey	Denotes the leader of the Combination classification
A jersey with a white rider number on a red background	Denotes the rider designated as the day's most combative	s.t.	A rider that crossed the finish line in the same group as the one receiving the time above him and was therefore credited with the same finishing time.

== Stage 1 ==
20 August 2011 — Benidorm, 13.5 km (8 mi) team time trial (TTT)

The Vuelta started with a team time trial in the coastal town of Benidorm. The first team on the route was Skil–Shimano, and they stopped the clock at 16' 48", a time that kept them in eighth place after the stage. Liquigas–Cannondale did the best time at the intermediate point, a second faster than Leopard Trek. Leopard Trek eventually won the stage by four seconds ahead of Liquigas–Cannondale. Team Sky was the negative surprise of the day, finishing 20th of the 22 teams. A number of events left the team at one point with four riders, with a team's time recorded when a fifth rider passes the finish line. Xabier Zandio recovered to join his four teammates out front, limiting any further time loss. Liquigas–Cannondale's leader, the defending champion, Vincenzo Nibali gained 21 seconds on Joaquim Rodríguez with Team Katusha finishing 10th, 24 seconds on Igor Antón's Euskaltel–Euskadi and 28 seconds on Michele Scarponi's Lampre–ISD.

Jakob Fuglsang was the first Leopard Trek rider who crossed the finish line, giving him the first red jersey and his first jersey at a Grand Tour.

Stage 1 result

	Team	Time
1	Leopard Trek	16' 30"
2	Liquigas–Cannondale	+ 4"
3	HTC–Highroad	+ 9"
4	Astana	+ 10"
5	Movistar Team	+ 14"
6	Quick-Step	+ 15"
7	Skil–Shimano	+ 18"
8	Omega Pharma–Lotto	+ 18"
9	Garmin–Cervélo	+ 25"
10	Team Katusha	+ 25"

General classification after stage 1

	Rider	Team	Time
1	Jakob Fuglsang (DEN)	Leopard Trek	16' 30"
2	Fabian Cancellara (SUI)	Leopard Trek	+ 0"
3	Maxime Monfort (BEL)	Leopard Trek	+ 0"
4	Thomas Rohregger (AUT)	Leopard Trek	+ 0"
5	Daniele Bennati (ITA)	Leopard Trek	+ 0"
6	Peter Sagan (SVK)	Liquigas–Cannondale	+ 4"
7	Damiano Caruso (ITA)	Liquigas–Cannondale	+ 4"
8	Eros Capecchi (ITA)	Liquigas–Cannondale	+ 4"
9	Valerio Agnoli (ITA)	Liquigas–Cannondale	+ 4"
10	Vincenzo Nibali (ITA)	Liquigas–Cannondale	+ 4"

== Stage 2 ==
21 August 2011 — La Nucia to Playas de Orihuela, 175.5 km (109 mi)

The breakaway of the day was formed by four riders: Steve Houanard (Ag2r–La Mondiale), Paul Martens (Rabobank), Adam Hansen (Omega Pharma–Lotto) and Jesús Rosendo (Andalucía–Caja Granada). The only categorized climb of the day was won by Martens, giving him the first blue polka dot jersey. Adam Hansen was the last from the breakaway to remain clear, but he was caught with 18 km (11 mi) to go. Davide Viganò of Leopard Trek was the first to make a move within the final kilometre, but he was caught immediately. After him there were Vicente Reynès of Omega Pharma–Lotto and Christopher Sutton of Team Sky who gained a gap on the field and they stayed clear until the finish with Sutton outsprinting Reynès, with Marcel Kittel completing the podium. Daniele Bennati moved into the red jersey due to his sixth position on the stage, taking the jersey from teammate Jakob Fuglsang. Sutton claimed the first green jersey, while Rosendo earned the white jersey for the combination classification.

Stage 2 result

	Rider	Team	Time
1	Christopher Sutton (AUS)	Team Sky	4h 11' 41"
2	Vicente Reynès (ESP)	Omega Pharma–Lotto	s.t.
3	Marcel Kittel (GER)	Skil–Shimano	s.t.
4	Tyler Farrar (USA)	Garmin–Cervélo	s.t.
5	Matti Breschel (DEN)	Rabobank	s.t.
6	Daniele Bennati (ITA)	Leopard Trek	s.t.
7	Enrico Gasparotto (ITA)	Astana	s.t.
8	Lloyd Mondory (FRA)	Ag2r–La Mondiale	s.t.
9	Luca Paolini (ITA)	Team Katusha	s.t.
10	John Degenkolb (GER)	HTC–Highroad	s.t.

General classification after stage 2

	Rider	Team	Time
1	Daniele Bennati (ITA)	Leopard Trek	4h 28' 11"
2	Jakob Fuglsang (DEN)	Leopard Trek	+ 0"
3	Maxime Monfort (BEL)	Leopard Trek	+ 0"
4	Thomas Rohregger (AUT)	Leopard Trek	+ 0"
5	Peter Sagan (SVK)	Liquigas–Cannondale	+ 4"
6	Vincenzo Nibali (ITA)	Liquigas–Cannondale	+ 4"
7	Eros Capecchi (ITA)	Liquigas–Cannondale	+ 4"
8	Valerio Agnoli (ITA)	Liquigas–Cannondale	+ 4"
9	Damiano Caruso (ITA)	Liquigas–Cannondale	+ 4"
10	John Degenkolb (GER)	HTC–Highroad	+ 9"

== Stage 3 ==
22 August 2011 — Petrer to Totana, 163.0 km (101 mi)

The initial breakaway of the day was formed by three riders: Sylvain Chavanel (Quick-Step), Nicolas Edet (Cofidis) and Ruslan Pidgornyy (Vacansoleil–DCM), before they were joined by two Spanish riders, Pablo Lastras of Movistar Team and Markel Irizar of Team RadioShack. Later, Edet had some medical problems and never rejoined the breakaway. With 16 km (10 mi) to go, Lastras attacked on the last slopes of the third category climb Alto de la Santa. By the time Lastras reached the top of the climb, he had 20 seconds in front of the remaining three riders from the breakaway, and two minutes ahead of the peloton. Lastras successfully maintained his advantage and won the stage by fifteen seconds, his first stage win at La Vuelta since 2002, and third of his career. Chavanel won the sprint finish for second place ahead of Irizar and Pidgornyy. The peloton, with all the race favourites in it, finished 1' 43" down on Lastras; Lastras' advantage over the main field gave him his first Grand Tour jersey, as well as the other sub-classification jerseys.

Stage 3 result

	Rider	Team	Time
1	Pablo Lastras (ESP)	Movistar Team	3h 58' 00"
2	Sylvain Chavanel (FRA)	Quick-Step	+ 15"
3	Markel Irizar (ESP)	Team RadioShack	+ 15"
4	Ruslan Pidgornyy (UKR)	Vacansoleil–DCM	+ 15"
5	Nicolas Roche (IRL)	Ag2r–La Mondiale	+ 1' 43"
6	Matti Breschel (DEN)	Rabobank	+ 1' 43"
7	Valerio Agnoli (ITA)	Liquigas–Cannondale	+ 1' 43"
8	Francesco Gavazzi (ITA)	Lampre–ISD	+ 1' 43"
9	Enrico Gasparotto (ITA)	Astana	+ 1' 43"
10	Jan Bakelants (BEL)	Omega Pharma–Lotto	+ 1' 43"

General classification after stage 3

	Rider	Team	Time
1	Pablo Lastras (ESP)	Movistar Team	8h 25' 59"
2	Sylvain Chavanel (FRA)	Quick-Step	+ 20"
3	Markel Irizar (ESP)	Team RadioShack	+ 1' 08"
4	Ruslan Pidgornyy (UKR)	Vacansoleil–DCM	+ 1' 24"
5	Jakob Fuglsang (DEN)	Leopard Trek	+ 1' 55"
6	Maxime Monfort (BEL)	Leopard Trek	+ 1' 55"
7	Vincenzo Nibali (ITA)	Liquigas–Cannondale	+ 1' 59"
8	Valerio Agnoli (ITA)	Liquigas–Cannondale	+ 1' 59"
9	Eros Capecchi (ITA)	Liquigas–Cannondale	+ 1' 59"
10	Kanstantsin Sivtsov (BLR)	HTC–Highroad	+ 2' 04"

== Stage 4 ==
23 August 2011 — Baza to Sierra Nevada, 170.2 km (106 mi)

Stage 4 result

	Rider	Team	Time
1	Daniel Moreno (ESP)	Team Katusha	4h 51' 53"
2	Chris Anker Sørensen (DEN)	Saxo Bank–SunGard	+ 3"
3	Dan Martin (IRL)	Garmin–Cervélo	+ 11"
4	Joaquim Rodríguez (ESP)	Team Katusha	+ 11"
5	Przemysław Niemiec (POL)	Lampre–ISD	+ 11"
6	Sergey Lagutin (UZB)	Vacansoleil–DCM	+ 11"
7	Jurgen Van den Broeck (BEL)	Omega Pharma–Lotto	+ 11"
8	Wout Poels (NED)	Vacansoleil–DCM	+ 11"
9	Michele Scarponi (ITA)	Lampre–ISD	+ 11"
10	Bauke Mollema (NED)	Rabobank	+ 11"

General classification after stage 4

	Rider	Team	Time
1	Sylvain Chavanel (FRA)	Quick-Step	13h 19' 09"
2	Daniel Moreno (ESP)	Team Katusha	+ 43"
3	Jakob Fuglsang (DEN)	Leopard Trek	+ 49"
4	Maxime Monfort (BEL)	Leopard Trek	+ 49"
5	Vincenzo Nibali (ITA)	Liquigas–Cannondale	+ 53"
6	Kanstantsin Sivtsov (BLR)	HTC–Highroad	+ 58"
7	Fredrik Kessiakoff (SWE)	Astana	+ 59"
8	Sergio Pardilla (ESP)	Movistar Team	+ 1' 03"
9	Marzio Bruseghin (ITA)	Movistar Team	+ 1' 03"
10	Kevin Seeldraeyers (BEL)	Quick-Step	+ 1' 04"

== Stage 5 ==
24 August 2011 — Sierra Nevada to Valdepeñas de Jaén, 187.0 km (116 mi)

Stage 5 result

	Rider	Team	Time
1	Joaquim Rodríguez (ESP)	Team Katusha	4h 42' 54"
2	Wout Poels (NED)	Vacansoleil–DCM	+ 4"
3	Daniel Moreno (ESP)	Team Katusha	+ 5"
4	Bauke Mollema (NED)	Rabobank	+ 7"
5	Michele Scarponi (ITA)	Lampre–ISD	+ 7"
6	Haimar Zubeldia (ESP)	Team RadioShack	+ 7"
7	Jakob Fuglsang (DEN)	Leopard Trek	+ 7"
8	Nicolas Roche (IRL)	Ag2r–La Mondiale	+ 7"
9	Jurgen Van den Broeck (BEL)	Omega Pharma–Lotto	+ 7"
10	Fredrik Kessiakoff (SWE)	Astana	+ 7"

General classification after stage 5

	Rider	Team	Time
1	Sylvain Chavanel (FRA)	Quick-Step	18h 02' 34"
2	Daniel Moreno (ESP)	Team Katusha	+ 9"
3	Joaquim Rodríguez (ESP)	Team Katusha	+ 23"
4	Jakob Fuglsang (DEN)	Leopard Trek	+ 25"
5	Vincenzo Nibali (ITA)	Liquigas–Cannondale	+ 33"
6	Fredrik Kessiakoff (SWE)	Astana	+ 35"
7	Maxime Monfort (BEL)	Leopard Trek	+ 38"
8	Jurgen Van den Broeck (BEL)	Omega Pharma–Lotto	+ 43"
9	Sergio Pardilla (ESP)	Movistar Team	+ 43"
10	Marzio Bruseghin (ITA)	Movistar Team	+ 52"

== Stage 6 ==
25 August 2011 — Úbeda to Córdoba, 196.8 km (122 mi)

Stage 6 result

	Rider	Team	Time
1	Peter Sagan (SVK)	Liquigas–Cannondale	4h 38' 22"
2	Pablo Lastras (ESP)	Movistar Team	s.t.
3	Valerio Agnoli (ITA)	Liquigas–Cannondale	s.t.
4	Vincenzo Nibali (ITA)	Liquigas–Cannondale	s.t.
5	Eros Capecchi (ITA)	Liquigas–Cannondale	+ 3"
6	Jakob Fuglsang (DEN)	Leopard Trek	+ 17"
7	Joaquim Rodríguez (ESP)	Team Katusha	+ 17"
8	Marzio Bruseghin (ITA)	Movistar Team	+ 17"
9	David Moncoutié (FRA)	Cofidis	+ 17"
10	Sylvain Chavanel (FRA)	Quick-Step	+ 17"

General classification after stage 6

	Rider	Team	Time
1	Sylvain Chavanel (FRA)	Quick-Step	22h 41' 13"
2	Daniel Moreno (ESP)	Team Katusha	+ 15"
3	Vincenzo Nibali (ITA)	Liquigas–Cannondale	+ 16"
4	Joaquim Rodríguez (ESP)	Team Katusha	+ 23"
5	Jakob Fuglsang (DEN)	Leopard Trek	+ 25"
6	Fredrik Kessiakoff (SWE)	Astana	+ 41"
7	Maxime Monfort (BEL)	Leopard Trek	+ 44"
8	Jurgen Van den Broeck (BEL)	Omega Pharma–Lotto	+ 49"
9	Sergio Pardilla (ESP)	Movistar Team	+ 49"
10	Marzio Bruseghin (ITA)	Movistar Team	+ 52"

== Stage 7 ==
26 August 2011 — Almadén to Talavera de la Reina, 187.6 km (117 mi)

Stage 7 result

	Rider	Team	Time
1	Marcel Kittel (GER)	Skil–Shimano	4h 47' 59"
2	Peter Sagan (SVK)	Liquigas–Cannondale	s.t.
3	Óscar Freire (ESP)	Rabobank	s.t.
4	Daniele Bennati (ITA)	Leopard Trek	s.t.
5	Lloyd Mondory (FRA)	Ag2r–La Mondiale	s.t.
6	Juan José Haedo (ARG)	Saxo Bank–SunGard	s.t.
7	Tom Veelers (NED)	Skil–Shimano	s.t.
8	Alessandro Petacchi (ITA)	Lampre–ISD	s.t.
9	Enrico Gasparotto (ITA)	Astana	s.t.
10	Leigh Howard (AUS)	HTC–Highroad	s.t.

General classification after stage 7

	Rider	Team	Time
1	Sylvain Chavanel (FRA)	Quick-Step	27h 29' 12"
2	Daniel Moreno (ESP)	Team Katusha	+ 15"
3	Vincenzo Nibali (ITA)	Liquigas–Cannondale	+ 16"
4	Joaquim Rodríguez (ESP)	Team Katusha	+ 23"
5	Jakob Fuglsang (DEN)	Leopard Trek	+ 25"
6	Fredrik Kessiakoff (SWE)	Astana	+ 41"
7	Maxime Monfort (BEL)	Leopard Trek	+ 44"
8	Jurgen Van den Broeck (BEL)	Omega Pharma–Lotto	+ 49"
9	Sergio Pardilla (ESP)	Movistar Team	+ 49"
10	Marzio Bruseghin (ITA)	Movistar Team	+ 52"

== Stage 8 ==
27 August 2011 — Talavera de la Reina to San Lorenzo de El Escorial, 177.3 km (110 mi)

Stage 8 result

	Rider	Team	Time
1	Joaquim Rodríguez (ESP)	Team Katusha	4h 49' 01"
2	Michele Scarponi (ITA)	Lampre–ISD	+ 9"
3	Bauke Mollema (NED)	Rabobank	+ 9"
4	Jurgen Van den Broeck (BEL)	Omega Pharma–Lotto	+ 9"
5	Jakob Fuglsang (DEN)	Leopard Trek	+ 12"
6	Igor Antón (ESP)	Euskaltel–Euskadi	+ 15"
7	Nicolas Roche (IRL)	Ag2r–La Mondiale	+ 15"
8	Denis Menchov (RUS)	Geox–TMC	+ 15"
9	Dan Martin (IRL)	Garmin–Cervélo	+ 15"
10	Fredrik Kessiakoff (SWE)	Astana	+ 15"

General classification after stage 8

	Rider	Team	Time
1	Joaquim Rodríguez (ESP)	Team Katusha	32h 18' 16"
2	Daniel Moreno (ESP)	Team Katusha	+ 32"
3	Jakob Fuglsang (DEN)	Leopard Trek	+ 34"
4	Vincenzo Nibali (ITA)	Liquigas–Cannondale	+ 45"
5	Michele Scarponi (ITA)	Lampre–ISD	+ 51"
6	Fredrik Kessiakoff (SWE)	Astana	+ 53"
7	Jurgen Van den Broeck (BEL)	Omega Pharma–Lotto	+ 55"
8	Bauke Mollema (NED)	Rabobank	+ 59"
9	Sylvain Chavanel (FRA)	Quick-Step	+ 1' 00"
10	Maxime Monfort (BEL)	Leopard Trek	+ 1' 01"

== Stage 9 ==
28 August 2011 — Villacastín to Sierra de Béjar – La Covatilla, 183.0 km (114 mi)

Stage 9 result

	Rider	Team	Time
1	Dan Martin (IRL)	Garmin–Cervélo	4h 52' 14"
2	Bauke Mollema (NED)	Rabobank	s.t.
-	~~Juan José Cobo~~ (ESP)	Geox–TMC	+ 3"
4	Bradley Wiggins (GBR)	Team Sky	+ 4"
5	Chris Froome (GBR)	Team Sky	+ 7"
6	Vincenzo Nibali (ITA)	Liquigas–Cannondale	+ 11"
7	Rein Taaramäe (EST)	Cofidis	+ 12"
8	Denis Menchov (RUS)	Geox–TMC	+ 12"
9	Haimar Zubeldia (ESP)	Team RadioShack	+ 12"
10	Fredrik Kessiakoff (SWE)	Astana	+ 12"

General classification after stage 9

	Rider	Team	Time
1	Bauke Mollema (NED)	Rabobank	37h 11' 17"
2	Joaquim Rodríguez (ESP)	Team Katusha	+ 1"
3	Vincenzo Nibali (ITA)	Liquigas–Cannondale	+ 9"
4	Fredrik Kessiakoff (SWE)	Astana	+ 18"
5	Jurgen Van den Broeck (BEL)	Omega Pharma–Lotto	+ 27"
6	Daniel Moreno (ESP)	Team Katusha	+ 35"
7	Jakob Fuglsang (DEN)	Leopard Trek	+ 37"
8	Kevin Seeldraeyers (BEL)	Quick-Step	+ 42"
9	Haimar Zubeldia (ESP)	Team RadioShack	+ 42"
-	~~Juan José Cobo~~ (ESP)	Geox–TMC	+ 46"

== Stage 10 ==
29 August 2011 — Salamanca, 47.0 km (29 mi) individual time trial (ITT)

Stage 10 result

	Rider	Team	Time
1	Tony Martin (GER)	HTC–Highroad	55' 54"
2	Chris Froome (GBR)	Team Sky	+ 59"
3	Bradley Wiggins (GBR)	Team Sky	+ 1' 22"
4	Fabian Cancellara (SUI)	Leopard Trek	+ 1' 27"
5	Taylor Phinney (USA)	BMC Racing Team	+ 1' 33"
6	Jakob Fuglsang (DEN)	Leopard Trek	+ 1' 37"
7	Tiago Machado (POR)	Team RadioShack	+ 1' 54"
8	Janez Brajkovič (SLO)	Team RadioShack	+ 1' 56"
9	Luis León Sánchez (ESP)	Rabobank	+ 2' 02"
10	Maxime Monfort (BEL)	Leopard Trek	+ 2' 06"

General classification after stage 10

	Rider	Team	Time
1	Chris Froome (GBR)	Team Sky	38h 09' 13"
2	Jakob Fuglsang (DEN)	Leopard Trek	+ 12"
3	Bradley Wiggins (GBR)	Team Sky	+ 20"
4	Vincenzo Nibali (ITA)	Liquigas–Cannondale	+ 31"
5	Fredrik Kessiakoff (SWE)	Astana	+ 34"
6	Maxime Monfort (BEL)	Leopard Trek	+ 59"
7	Bauke Mollema (NED)	Rabobank	+ 1' 07"
-	~~Juan José Cobo~~ (ESP)	Geox–TMC	+ 1' 47"
9	Janez Brajkovič (SLO)	Team RadioShack	+ 2' 04"
10	Haimar Zubeldia (ESP)	Team RadioShack	+ 2' 13"

== Stage 11 ==
31 August 2011 — Verín to Estación de Esquí Alto de la Manzaneda, 167.0 km (104 mi)

Stage 11 result

	Rider	Team	Time
1	David Moncoutié (FRA)	Cofidis	4h 38' 00"
2	Beñat Intxausti (ESP)	Movistar Team	+ 1' 18"
3	Luis León Sánchez (ESP)	Rabobank	+ 1' 18"
4	Mathias Frank (SUI)	BMC Racing Team	+ 1' 36"
5	Sérgio Paulinho (POR)	Team RadioShack	+ 1' 43"
6	Matteo Montaguti (ITA)	Ag2r–La Mondiale	+ 2' 29"
7	Amets Txurruka (ESP)	Euskaltel–Euskadi	+ 2' 29"
8	Aitor Pérez (ESP)	Lampre–ISD	+ 2' 55"
9	Joaquim Rodríguez (ESP)	Team Katusha	+ 3' 01"
10	David Bernabeu (ESP)	Andalucía–Caja Granada	+ 3' 08"

General classification after stage 11

	Rider	Team	Time
1	Bradley Wiggins (GBR)	Team Sky	42h 50' 41"
2	Chris Froome (GBR)	Team Sky	+ 7"
3	Vincenzo Nibali (ITA)	Liquigas–Cannondale	+ 11"
4	Fredrik Kessiakoff (SWE)	Astana	+ 14"
5	Jakob Fuglsang (DEN)	Leopard Trek	+ 19"
6	Bauke Mollema (NED)	Rabobank	+ 47"
7	Maxime Monfort (BEL)	Leopard Trek	+ 1' 06"
-	~~Juan José Cobo~~ (ESP)	Geox–TMC	+ 1' 27"
9	Haimar Zubeldia (ESP)	Team RadioShack	+ 1' 53"
10	Janez Brajkovič (SLO)	Team RadioShack	+ 2' 00"
