= 2011 Vuelta a España, Stage 12 to Stage 21 =

Cycling race stages

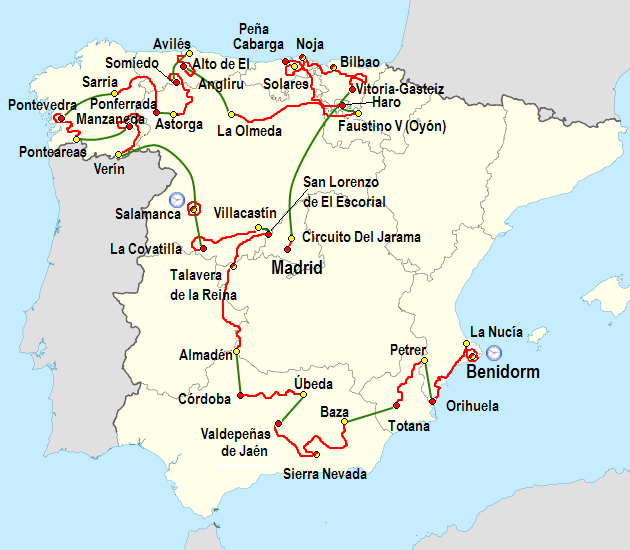
Route of the 2011 Vuelta a España

These are the profiles for the individual stages in the 2011 Vuelta a España, with Stage 12 on 1 September, and Stage 21 on 11 September.

Legend (Note: Jerseys appearing in the table on the left of the page indicate those worn by the cyclist during the particular stage, while those appearing in the table on the right of the page indicate those awarded to the cyclist after the stage.)
A red jersey	Denotes the leader of the General classification	A bluedotted jersey	Denotes the leader of the Mountains classification
A green jersey	Denotes the leader of the Points classification	A white jersey	Denotes the leader of the Combination classification
A jersey with a white rider number on a red background	Denotes the rider designated as the day's most combative	s.t.	A rider that crossed the finish line in the same group as the one receiving the time above him and was therefore credited with the same finishing time.

== Stage 12 ==
1 September 2011 — Ponteareas to Pontevedra, 167.3 km (104 mi)

Stage 12 result

	Rider	Team	Time
1	Peter Sagan (SVK)	Liquigas–Cannondale	4h 03' 01"
2	John Degenkolb (GER)	HTC–Highroad	s.t.
3	Daniele Bennati (ITA)	Leopard Trek	s.t.
4	Alessandro Petacchi (ITA)	Lampre–ISD	s.t.
5	Juan José Haedo (ARG)	Saxo Bank–SunGard	s.t.
6	Tom Boonen (BEL)	Quick-Step	s.t.
7	Greg Van Avermaet (BEL)	BMC Racing Team	s.t.
8	Paul Martens (GER)	Rabobank	s.t.
9	Nikolas Maes (BEL)	Quick-Step	s.t.
10	Lloyd Mondory (FRA)	Ag2r–La Mondiale	s.t.

General classification after stage 12

	Rider	Team	Time
1	Bradley Wiggins (GBR)	Team Sky	46h 53' 47"
2	Chris Froome (GBR)	Team Sky	+ 7"
3	Fredrik Kessiakoff (SWE)	Astana	+ 9"
4	Vincenzo Nibali (ITA)	Liquigas–Cannondale	+ 10"
5	Jakob Fuglsang (DEN)	Leopard Trek	+ 19"
6	Bauke Mollema (NED)	Rabobank	+ 36"
7	Maxime Monfort (BEL)	Leopard Trek	+ 1' 06"
-	~~Juan José Cobo~~ (ESP)	Geox–TMC	+ 1' 27"
9	Haimar Zubeldia (ESP)	Team RadioShack	+ 1' 53"
10	Janez Brajkovič (SLO)	Team RadioShack	+ 2' 00"

== Stage 13 ==
2 September 2011 — Sarria to Ponferrada, 158.2 km (98 mi)

Stage 13 result

	Rider	Team	Time
1	Michael Albasini (SUI)	HTC–Highroad	4h 19' 39"
2	Eros Capecchi (ITA)	Liquigas–Cannondale	s.t.
3	Daniel Moreno (ESP)	Team Katusha	s.t.
4	David de la Fuente (ESP)	Geox–TMC	s.t.
5	Nicolas Roche (IRL)	Ag2r–La Mondiale	s.t.
6	Oliver Zaugg (SUI)	Leopard Trek	s.t.
7	Ángel Madrazo (ESP)	Movistar Team	s.t.
8	David Blanco (ESP)	Geox–TMC	s.t.
9	Mikel Nieve (ESP)	Euskaltel–Euskadi	s.t.
10	Marc de Maar (CUW)	Quick-Step	s.t.

General classification after stage 13

	Rider	Team	Time
1	Bradley Wiggins (GBR)	Team Sky	51h 14' 59"
2	Vincenzo Nibali (ITA)	Liquigas–Cannondale	+ 4"
3	Chris Froome (GBR)	Team Sky	+ 7"
4	Fredrik Kessiakoff (SWE)	Astana	+ 9"
5	Jakob Fuglsang (DEN)	Leopard Trek	+ 19"
6	Bauke Mollema (NED)	Rabobank	+ 36"
7	Maxime Monfort (BEL)	Leopard Trek	+ 1' 04"
-	~~Juan José Cobo~~ (ESP)	Geox–TMC	+ 1' 27"
9	Daniel Moreno (ESP)	Team Katusha	+ 1' 52"
10	Haimar Zubeldia (ESP)	Team RadioShack	+ 1' 53"

== Stage 14 ==
3 September 2011 — Astorga to La Farrapona – Lagos de Somiedo, 172.8 km (107 mi)

Stage 14 result

	Rider	Team	Time
1	Rein Taaramäe (EST)	Cofidis	4h 39' 01"
-	~~Juan José Cobo~~ (ESP)	Geox–TMC	+ 25"
3	David de la Fuente (ESP)	Geox–TMC	+ 29"
4	Wout Poels (NED)	Vacansoleil–DCM	+ 40"
5	Bradley Wiggins (GBR)	Team Sky	+ 45"
6	Chris Froome (GBR)	Team Sky	+ 45"
7	Bauke Mollema (NED)	Rabobank	+ 45"
8	Denis Menchov (RUS)	Geox–TMC	+ 45"
9	Mikel Nieve (ESP)	Euskaltel–Euskadi	+ 55"
10	Jurgen Van den Broeck (BEL)	Omega Pharma–Lotto	+ 1' 00"

General classification after stage 14

	Rider	Team	Time
1	Bradley Wiggins (GBR)	Team Sky	55h 54' 45"
2	Chris Froome (GBR)	Team Sky	+ 7"
3	Bauke Mollema (NED)	Rabobank	+ 36"
-	~~Juan José Cobo~~ (ESP)	Geox–TMC	+ 55"
5	Jakob Fuglsang (DEN)	Leopard Trek	+ 58"
6	Fredrik Kessiakoff (SWE)	Astana	+ 1' 23"
7	Vincenzo Nibali (ITA)	Liquigas–Cannondale	+ 1' 25"
8	Maxime Monfort (BEL)	Leopard Trek	+ 1' 37"
9	Jurgen Van den Broeck (BEL)	Omega Pharma–Lotto	+ 2' 16"
10	Daniel Moreno (ESP)	Team Katusha	+ 2' 24"

== Stage 15 ==
4 September 2011 — Avilés to Angliru, 142.2 km (88 mi)

Stage 15 result

	Rider	Team	Time
-	~~Juan José Cobo~~ (ESP)	Geox–TMC	4h 01' 56"
2	Wout Poels (NED)	Vacansoleil–DCM	+ 48"
3	Denis Menchov (RUS)	Geox–TMC	+ 48"
4	Chris Froome (GBR)	Team Sky	+ 48"
5	Bradley Wiggins (GBR)	Team Sky	+ 1' 21"
6	Igor Antón (ESP)	Euskaltel–Euskadi	+ 1' 21"
7	Joaquim Rodríguez (ESP)	Team Katusha	+ 1' 35"
8	Maxime Monfort (BEL)	Leopard Trek	+ 1' 35"
9	Bauke Mollema (NED)	Rabobank	+ 1' 35"
10	Sergey Lagutin (UZB)	Vacansoleil–DCM	+ 1' 35"

General classification after stage 15

	Rider	Team	Time
-	~~Juan José Cobo~~ (ESP)	Geox–TMC	59h 57' 16"
2	Chris Froome (GBR)	Team Sky	+ 20"
3	Bradley Wiggins (GBR)	Team Sky	+ 46"
4	Bauke Mollema (NED)	Rabobank	+ 1' 36"
5	Maxime Monfort (BEL)	Leopard Trek	+ 2' 37"
6	Denis Menchov (RUS)	Geox–TMC	+ 3' 01"
7	Jakob Fuglsang (DEN)	Leopard Trek	+ 3' 06"
8	Vincenzo Nibali (ITA)	Liquigas–Cannondale	+ 3' 27"
9	Jurgen Van den Broeck (BEL)	Omega Pharma–Lotto	+ 3' 58"
10	Wout Poels (NED)	Vacansoleil–DCM	+ 4' 13"

== Stage 16 ==
6 September 2011 — Villa Romana La Olmeda, Palencia to Haro, 188.1 km (117 mi)

Stage 16 result

	Rider	Team	Time
1	Juan José Haedo (ARG)	Saxo Bank–SunGard	4h 41' 56"
2	Alessandro Petacchi (ITA)	Lampre–ISD	s.t.
3	Daniele Bennati (ITA)	Leopard Trek	s.t.
4	Vicente Reynès (ESP)	Omega Pharma–Lotto	s.t.
5	Leigh Howard (AUS)	HTC–Highroad	+ 2"
6	Koen de Kort (NED)	Skil–Shimano	+ 2"
7	Lloyd Mondory (FRA)	Ag2r–La Mondiale	+ 2"
8	Nikolas Maes (BEL)	Quick-Step	+ 2"
9	Christopher Sutton (AUS)	Team Sky	+ 2"
-	~~Juan José Cobo~~ (ESP)	Geox–TMC	+ 2"

General classification after stage 16

	Rider	Team	Time
-	~~Juan José Cobo~~ (ESP)	Geox–TMC	64h 39' 14"
2	Chris Froome (GBR)	Team Sky	+ 22"
3	Bradley Wiggins (GBR)	Team Sky	+ 51"
4	Bauke Mollema (NED)	Rabobank	+ 1' 41"
5	Maxime Monfort (BEL)	Leopard Trek	+ 2' 40"
6	Denis Menchov (RUS)	Geox–TMC	+ 3' 06"
7	Jakob Fuglsang (DEN)	Leopard Trek	+ 3' 08"
8	Vincenzo Nibali (ITA)	Liquigas–Cannondale	+ 3' 29"
9	Jurgen Van den Broeck (BEL)	Omega Pharma–Lotto	+ 4' 03"
10	Wout Poels (NED)	Vacansoleil–DCM	+ 4' 18"

== Stage 17 ==
7 September 2011 — Faustino V to Peña Cabarga, 211.0 km (131 mi)

Stage 17 result

	Rider	Team	Time
1	Chris Froome (GBR)	Team Sky	4h 52' 38"
-	~~Juan José Cobo~~ (ESP)	Geox–TMC	+ 1"
3	Bauke Mollema (NED)	Rabobank	+ 21"
4	Dan Martin (IRL)	Garmin–Cervélo	+ 24"
5	Igor Antón (ESP)	Euskaltel–Euskadi	+ 27"
6	Mikel Nieve (ESP)	Euskaltel–Euskadi	+ 27"
7	Marzio Bruseghin (ITA)	Movistar Team	+ 29"
8	Jurgen Van den Broeck (BEL)	Omega Pharma–Lotto	+ 31"
9	Denis Menchov (RUS)	Geox–TMC	+ 31"
10	Beñat Intxausti (ESP)	Movistar Team	+ 35"

General classification after stage 17

	Rider	Team	Time
-	~~Juan José Cobo~~ (ESP)	Geox–TMC	69h 31' 41"
2	Chris Froome (GBR)	Team Sky	+ 13"
3	Bradley Wiggins (GBR)	Team Sky	+ 1' 41"
4	Bauke Mollema (NED)	Rabobank	+ 2' 05"
5	Denis Menchov (RUS)	Geox–TMC	+ 3' 48"
6	Maxime Monfort (BEL)	Leopard Trek	+ 4' 13"
7	Vincenzo Nibali (ITA)	Liquigas–Cannondale	+ 4' 31"
8	Jurgen Van den Broeck (BEL)	Omega Pharma–Lotto	+ 4' 45"
9	Daniel Moreno (ESP)	Team Katusha	+ 5' 20"
10	Mikel Nieve (ESP)	Euskaltel–Euskadi	+ 5' 33"

== Stage 18 ==
8 September 2011 — Solares to Noja, 174.6 km (108 mi)

Stage 18 result

	Rider	Team	Time
1	Francesco Gavazzi (ITA)	Lampre–ISD	4h 24' 42"
2	Kristof Vandewalle (BEL)	Quick-Step	s.t.
3	Alexandre Geniez (FRA)	Skil–Shimano	+ 10"
4	Nico Sijmens (BEL)	Cofidis	+ 10"
5	Matteo Montaguti (ITA)	Ag2r–La Mondiale	+ 10"
6	Volodymir Gustov (UKR)	Saxo Bank–SunGard	+ 10"
7	Juan José Oroz (ESP)	Euskaltel–Euskadi	+ 10"
8	Joaquim Rodríguez (ESP)	Team Katusha	+ 10"
9	Robert Kišerlovski (CRO)	Astana	+ 10"
10	Francis De Greef (BEL)	Omega Pharma–Lotto	+ 15"

General classification after stage 18

	Rider	Team	Time
-	~~Juan José Cobo~~ (ESP)	Geox–TMC	74h 04' 05"
2	Chris Froome (GBR)	Team Sky	+ 13"
3	Bradley Wiggins (GBR)	Team Sky	+ 1' 41"
4	Bauke Mollema (NED)	Rabobank	+ 2' 05"
5	Denis Menchov (RUS)	Geox–TMC	+ 3' 48"
6	Maxime Monfort (BEL)	Leopard Trek	+ 4' 13"
7	Vincenzo Nibali (ITA)	Liquigas–Cannondale	+ 4' 31"
8	Jurgen Van den Broeck (BEL)	Omega Pharma–Lotto	+ 4' 45"
9	Daniel Moreno (ESP)	Team Katusha	+ 5' 20"
10	Mikel Nieve (ESP)	Euskaltel–Euskadi	+ 5' 33"

== Stage 19 ==
9 September 2011 — Noja to Bilbao, 158.5 km (98 mi)

Stage 19 result

	Rider	Team	Time
1	Igor Antón (ESP)	Euskaltel–Euskadi	3h 53' 34"
2	Marzio Bruseghin (ITA)	Movistar Team	+ 41"
3	Dominik Nerz (GER)	Liquigas–Cannondale	+ 1' 30"
4	Haimar Zubeldia (ESP)	Team RadioShack	+ 1' 30"
5	Chris Anker Sørensen (DEN)	Saxo Bank–SunGard	+ 1' 31"
6	David de la Fuente (ESP)	Geox–TMC	+ 1' 33"
7	Jakob Fuglsang (DEN)	Leopard Trek	+ 1' 33"
8	Vincenzo Nibali (ITA)	Liquigas–Cannondale	+ 1' 33"
9	Eros Capecchi (ITA)	Liquigas–Cannondale	+ 1' 33"
10	Bauke Mollema (NED)	Rabobank	+ 1' 33"

General classification after stage 19

	Rider	Team	Time
-	~~Juan José Cobo~~ (ESP)	Geox–TMC	77h 59' 12"
2	Chris Froome (GBR)	Team Sky	+ 13"
3	Bradley Wiggins (GBR)	Team Sky	+ 1' 41"
4	Bauke Mollema (NED)	Rabobank	+ 2' 03"
5	Denis Menchov (RUS)	Geox–TMC	+ 3' 48"
6	Maxime Monfort (BEL)	Leopard Trek	+ 4' 13"
7	Vincenzo Nibali (ITA)	Liquigas–Cannondale	+ 4' 31"
8	Jurgen Van den Broeck (BEL)	Omega Pharma–Lotto	+ 4' 45"
9	Daniel Moreno (ESP)	Team Katusha	+ 5' 20"
10	Mikel Nieve (ESP)	Euskaltel–Euskadi	+ 5' 33"

== Stage 20 ==
10 September 2011 — Bilbao to Vitoria, 185.0 km (115 mi)

Stage 20 result

	Rider	Team	Time
1	Daniele Bennati (ITA)	Leopard Trek	4h 39' 20"
2	Enrico Gasparotto (ITA)	Astana	s.t.
3	Damiano Caruso (ITA)	Liquigas–Cannondale	s.t.
4	Sep Vanmarcke (BEL)	Garmin–Cervélo	s.t.
5	Koen de Kort (NED)	Skil–Shimano	s.t.
6	Manuele Mori (ITA)	Lampre–ISD	s.t.
7	Davide Malacarne (ITA)	Quick-Step	s.t.
8	Kristof Vandewalle (BEL)	Quick-Step	s.t.
9	Bauke Mollema (NED)	Rabobank	s.t.
10	Eros Capecchi (ITA)	Liquigas–Cannondale	s.t.

General classification after stage 20

	Rider	Team	Time
-	~~Juan José Cobo~~ (ESP)	Geox–TMC	82h 38' 32"
2	Chris Froome (GBR)	Team Sky	+ 13"
3	Bradley Wiggins (GBR)	Team Sky	+ 1' 39"
4	Bauke Mollema (NED)	Rabobank	+ 2' 03"
5	Denis Menchov (RUS)	Geox–TMC	+ 3' 48"
6	Maxime Monfort (BEL)	Leopard Trek	+ 4' 13"
7	Vincenzo Nibali (ITA)	Liquigas–Cannondale	+ 4' 31"
8	Jurgen Van den Broeck (BEL)	Omega Pharma–Lotto	+ 4' 45"
9	Daniel Moreno (ESP)	Team Katusha	+ 5' 20"
10	Mikel Nieve (ESP)	Euskaltel–Euskadi	+ 5' 33"

== Stage 21 ==
11 September 2011 — Circuito del Jarama to Madrid, 94.2 km (59 mi)

Stage 21 result

	Rider	Team	Time
1	Peter Sagan (SVK)	Liquigas–Cannondale	2h 20' 59"
2	Daniele Bennati (ITA)	Leopard Trek	s.t.
3	Alessandro Petacchi (ITA)	Lampre–ISD	s.t.
4	John Degenkolb (GER)	HTC–Highroad	s.t.
5	Nikolas Maes (BEL)	Quick-Step	s.t.
6	Pim Ligthart (NED)	Vacansoleil–DCM	s.t.
7	Christopher Sutton (AUS)	Team Sky	s.t.
8	Koen de Kort (NED)	Skil–Shimano	s.t.
9	Bauke Mollema (NED)	Rabobank	s.t.
10	Vicente Reynès (ESP)	Omega Pharma–Lotto	s.t.

Final General Classification

	Rider	Team	Time
-	~~Juan José Cobo~~ (ESP)	Geox–TMC	84h 59' 31"
2	Chris Froome (GBR)	Team Sky	+ 13"
3	Bradley Wiggins (GBR)	Team Sky	+ 1' 39"
4	Bauke Mollema (NED)	Rabobank	+ 2' 03"
5	Denis Menchov (RUS)	Geox–TMC	+ 3' 48"
6	Maxime Monfort (BEL)	Leopard Trek	+ 4' 13"
7	Vincenzo Nibali (ITA)	Liquigas–Cannondale	+ 4' 31"
8	Jurgen Van den Broeck (BEL)	Omega Pharma–Lotto	+ 4' 45"
9	Daniel Moreno (ESP)	Team Katusha	+ 5' 20"
10	Mikel Nieve (ESP)	Euskaltel–Euskadi	+ 5' 33"
