= 2009 GP Miguel Induráin =

Race details
- Dates: 4 April 2009
- Stages: 1
- Distance: 191.4 km (118.9 mi)
- Winning time: 5h 09' 05"

Results
	Winner	David de la Fuente (ESP)
	Second	Alexandr Kolobnev (RUS)
	Third	Fabian Wegmann (GER)

The 2009 GP Miguel Induráin was the 56th edition of the GP Miguel Induráin cycle race and was held on 4 April 2009. The race started and finished in Estella. The race was won by David de la Fuente.

== General classification ==
Final general classification

Rank	Rider	Time
1	David de la Fuente (ESP)	5h 09' 05"
2	Alexandr Kolobnev (RUS)	+ 0"
3	Fabian Wegmann (GER)	+ 0"
4	Christian Pfannberger (AUT)	+ 0"
5	Vincenzo Nibali (ITA)	+ 6"
6	Xavier Florencio (ESP)	+ 6"
7	Chris Anker Sørensen (DEN)	+ 10"
8	Hubert Dupont (FRA)	+ 12"
9	Xavier Tondo (ESP)	+ 13"
10	Daniel Moreno (ESP)	+ 13"
