= 2011 Vuelta a España =

66th edition of the cycling race

2011 UCI World Tour, race 21 of 27
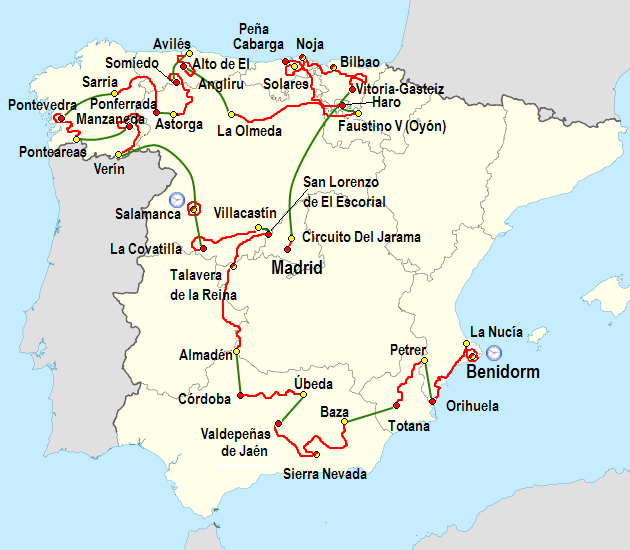

Race details
- Dates: 20 August – 11 September
- Stages: 21
- Distance: 3,300 km (2,100 mi)
- Winning time: 84h 59' 44"

Results
Jersey awarded to the overall winner	Winner	~~Juan José Cobo~~ Chris Froome (GBR)	(Team Sky)
	Second	Bradley Wiggins (GBR)	(Team Sky)
	Third	Bauke Mollema (NED)	(Rabobank)
Jersey awarded to the points classification winner	Points	Bauke Mollema (NED)	(Rabobank)
Jersey awarded to the mountains classification winner	Mountains	David Moncoutié (FRA)	(Cofidis)
Jersey awarded to the combination classification winner	Combination	~~Juan José Cobo~~ Chris Froome (GBR)	(Team Sky)
	Team	(Spain) Geox–TMC	

The 2011 Vuelta a España was held from 20 August to 11 September. The bicycle race began in Benidorm with a team time trial and ended, as is traditional, in Madrid. The 2011 Vuelta was the 66th edition of the race and was the first Vuelta in 33 years that visited the Basque Country. The 33-year absence from the region was due to fear of political protests.

Commentators claimed that it was a race well suited for climbers due to the short time trials and the large number of climbing kilometres. Nine of the twenty-one stages were ranked as Mountain stages, and six of them had a mountain-top finish (including the very steep uphill finish on the Alto de L'Angliru). Two other stages had steep uphill finishes, both of which were won by Katusha leader Joaquim Rodríguez.

This Vuelta saw the introduction of a combativity award, much like that in the Tour de France. The most combative rider in each stage was awarded a red back number which he wore for the next stage.

The victory was originally awarded to Juan José Cobo who had a race-winning margin of just 13 seconds over Briton Chris Froome. Neither rider had been marked as a pre-race favourite, and both had gone to the Vuelta as domestiques for their team leaders: Cobo for Denis Menchov, and Froome for Bradley Wiggins; their team leaders originally finished 5th and 3rd respectively. The race was the first time that two Britons had stood on the podium of a Grand Tour, and Froome's second-place finish was, at the time, the best result in a Grand Tour by a British rider, until Wiggins won the Tour de France the following year. Cobo also won the Combination Classification. The King of the Mountains competition was won for the fourth consecutive time by Frenchman David Moncoutié. The points classification was won by Dutch rider Bauke Mollema who finished 4th overall.

On 13 June 2019, the sport's governing body, the Union Cycliste International (UCI), announced that Cobo had been found guilty of an anti-doping violation, according to findings from his biological passport. As a result, the UCI penalised him with a three-year period of ineligibility. Cobo was officially stripped of the title on 18 June 2019. On 17 July 2019, as the time for Cobo to appeal the decision expired with no application, the UCI announced it recognised Chris Froome as the 2011 champion, making him retroactively the first Briton to win a Grand Tour. Froome was also promoted to the winning position in the combination classification. Wiggins was promoted to runner-up, his second promotion on a Grand Tour podium due to doping, and Mollema was promoted to the podium in third.

Froome, who had in the intervening time finally won the 2017 Vuelta a España, 'on the road', officially received the 2011 winner's trophy at the start of the final stage of the 2020 edition on 8 November 2020.

== Teams ==
The 18 teams in the Union Cycliste Internationale (UCI) Proteam category were obliged to enter the race. Four UCI Professional Continental teams were also invited.

The full list of participating teams is:

- Ag2r–La Mondiale
- Andalucía–Caja Granada †
- Astana
- BMC Racing Team
- Cofidis †
- Euskaltel–Euskadi
- Garmin–Cervélo
- Geox–TMC †
- HTC–Highroad
- Team Katusha
- Lampre–ISD
- Leopard Trek
- Liquigas–Cannondale
- Movistar Team
- Omega Pharma–Lotto
- Quick-Step
- Rabobank
- Team RadioShack
- Saxo Bank–SunGard
- Skil–Shimano †
- Team Sky
- Vacansoleil–DCM

†: Invited Pro-continental teams.

== Pre-race favourites ==
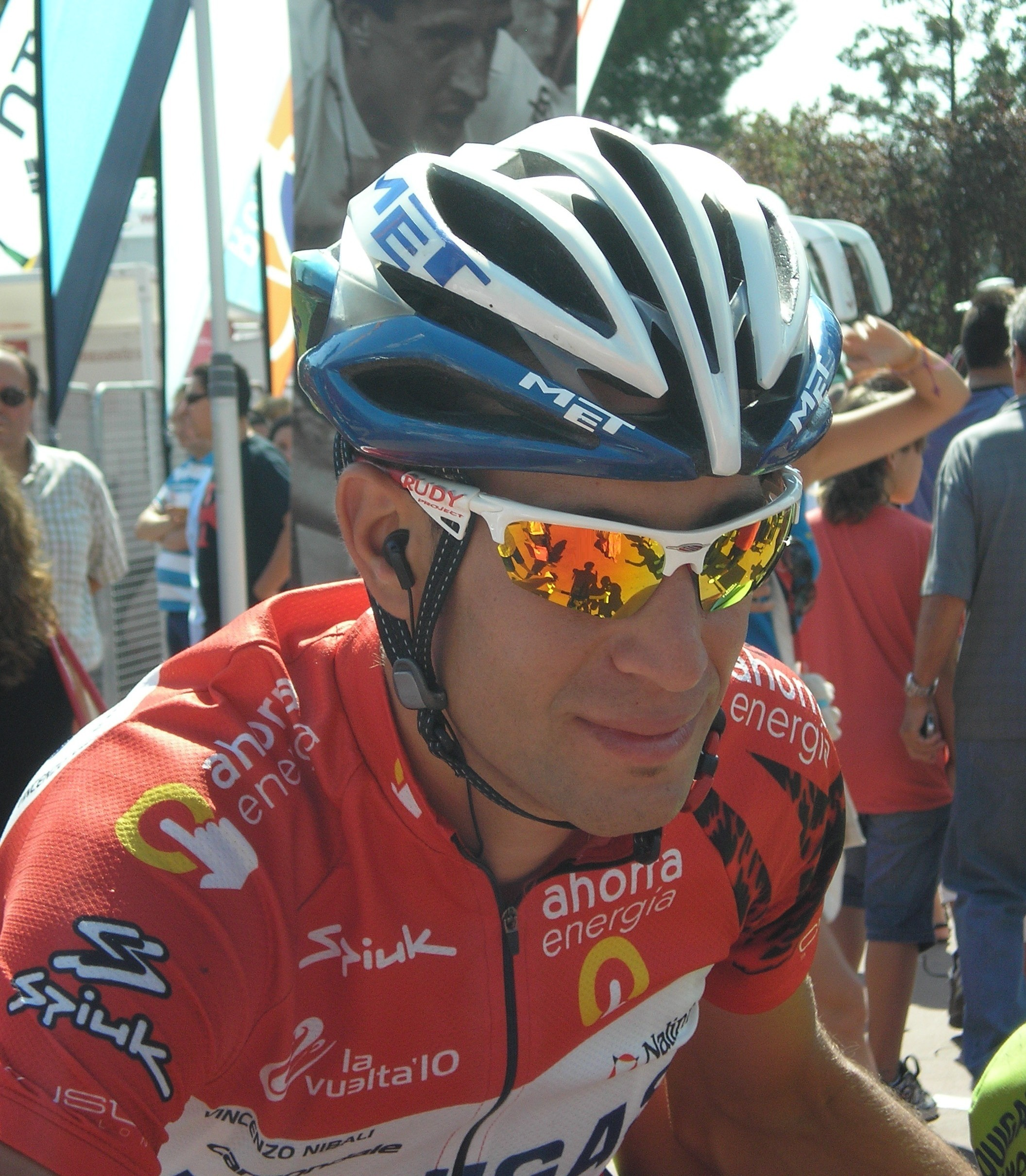
2010 winner Vincenzo Nibali of the Liquigas–Cannondale team, was seen as the top-favourite.

2010 winner Vincenzo Nibali came to defend his Vuelta title and was seen as the favourite due to the better time-trial skills than climbers as Igor Antón, Joaquim Rodríguez and Michele Scarponi. Anton was regarded as the strongest climber in the 2010 race, but due to a crash he had to withdraw from the race. Ezequiel Mosquera did not start the race, the 2010 runner-up being suspended from racing by his team Vacansoleil–DCM due to an ongoing doping investigation.

Two other Grand Tour winners in the Vuelta peloton were Carlos Sastre (winner of the 2008 Tour de France) and Denis Menchov (two-time winner of the Vuelta and winner of the 2009 Giro d'Italia). Both riders of the Geox–TMC team were looking for better results after disappointing Giro campaigns. Sastre finished in thirtieth place, while Menchov finished eighth. Menchov had allergies and physical problems at the Giro d'Italia and was looking for a third Vuelta win. The Russian could count on one of the best team supports in the mountains with climbers as Sastre, Juan José Cobo and Fabio Duarte.

Other favourites for the podium had had a disappointing Tour de France and were looking to improve in the Vuelta. Janez Brajkovič, Bradley Wiggins and Jurgen van den Broeck crashed out of the Tour in the first week while Andreas Klöden withdrew from the race a week later, also due to injuries of a crash. Wiggins showed good form before the Tour and was seen as a podium candidate for the Tour. His accomplished time-trialling, together with his improved climbing skills, made him a favourite for the Vuelta victory.

Among the top ten contenders were several promising talents, including Dan Martin (winner of the 2010 Tour de Pologne, runner up of the 2011 Tour de Pologne and third overall at the 2011 Volta a Catalunya), Steven Kruijswijk (ninth in the 2011 Giro, third overall and a mountain stage win at the 2011 Tour de Suisse), Bauke Mollema (twelfth at the 2010 Giro d'Italia and fifth overall at the 2011 Tour de Suisse) and Rein Taaramäe (twelfth at the 2011 Tour de France, third overall at the 2011 Critérium International and fourth overall at the 2011 Paris–Nice. Other contenders for the top ten were Garmin's co-leader Christophe Le Mével and Ag2R's Nicolas Roche.

== Route and stages ==
The full route for the 2011 Vuelta was unveiled in Benidorm on January 12, 2011. The climbers immediately liked the route of the race with six mountain stages with uphill finishes and another two flat stages with steep uphill finishes. Among the uphill finishes were the infamous Alto de L'Angliru and the climb to the Sierra Nevada. Two finishes were on climbs that have never been featured in the Vuelta before. These are to Estacion de Montaña Manzaneda in Galicia on stage 11 and La Farrapona in the Asturias region on stage 14. Olympic Road Champion Samuel Sánchez pointed out that the lack of Time Trial kilometres make the race very interesting because there are not enough of them for GC riders with good time trialing ability to take advantage for the variety of mountain stages.

It was the first Vuelta since 33 years that visited the Basque Country. The 33-year absence of the region was due to fear of political protests. Separatists of the Basque Country were unhappy with the return of the Vuelta and calling the coming of the Vuelta 'A Waste of Money'. Although the criticism of several Separatists on the route of this year, the organizers of the Vuelta announced on 8 September that the 2012 event will start in the Navarrese city of Pamplona.

Stage characteristics and winners
Stage	Date	Course	Distance	Type		Winner
1	20 August	Benidorm	13.5 km (8.4 mi)	Team time trial	Team time trial	Leopard Trek
2	21 August	La Nucía to Playas de Orihuela	175.5 km (109 mi)		Flat stage	Christopher Sutton (AUS)
3	22 August	Petrer to Totana	163 km (101 mi)		Flat stage	Pablo Lastras (ESP)
4	23 August	Baza to Sierra Nevada	170.2 km (105.8 mi)		Mountain stage	Daniel Moreno (ESP)
5	24 August	Sierra Nevada to Valdepeñas de Jaén	187 km (116 mi)		Medium mountain stage	Joaquim Rodríguez (ESP)
6	25 August	Úbeda to Córdoba	196.8 km (122 mi)		Medium mountain stage	Peter Sagan (SVK)
7	26 August	Almadén to Talavera de la Reina	187.6 km (116.6 mi)		Flat stage	Marcel Kittel (GER)
8	27 August	Talavera de la Reina to San Lorenzo de El Escorial	177.3 km (110.2 mi)		Medium mountain stage	Joaquim Rodríguez (ESP)
9	28 August	Villacastín to Sierra de Bejar La Covatilla	183 km (114 mi)		Mountain stage	Dan Martin (IRL)
10	29 August	Salamanca	47 km (29.2 mi)	Individual time trial	Individual time trial	Tony Martin (GER)
	30 August	Rest day				
11	31 August	Verín to Estación de Esquí Manzaneda	167 km (104 mi)		Mountain stage	David Moncoutié (FRA)
12	1 September	Ponteareas to Pontevedra	167.3 km (104.0 mi)		Flat stage	Peter Sagan (SVK)
13	2 September	Sarria to Ponferrada	158.2 km (98.3 mi)		Mountain stage	Michael Albasini (SUI)
14	3 September	Astorga to La Farrapona. Lagos de Somiedo	172.8 km (107.4 mi)		Mountain stage	Rein Taaramäe (EST)
15	4 September	Avilés to Angliru	142.2 km (88.4 mi)		Mountain stage	~~Juan José Cobo~~ (ESP); Wout Poels (NED)
	5 September	Rest day				
16	6 September	Villa Romana La Olmeda (Palencia) to Haro	188.1 km (116.9 mi)		Flat stage	Juan José Haedo (ARG)
17	7 September	Faustino V (Oyón) to Peña Cabarga	211 km (131 mi)		Mountain stage	Chris Froome (GBR)
18	8 September	Solares to Noja	174.6 km (108.5 mi)		Medium mountain stage	Francesco Gavazzi (ITA)
19	9 September	Noja to Bilbao	158.5 km (98.5 mi)		Medium mountain stage	Igor Antón (ESP)
20	10 September	Bilbao to Vitoria-Gasteiz	185 km (115.0 mi)		Medium mountain stage	Daniele Bennati (ITA)
21	11 September	Circuito del Jarama to Madrid	94.2 km (58.5 mi)		Flat stage	Peter Sagan (SVK)
Total			3319.8 km (2062.8 mi)			

== Race overview ==
For details see 2011 Vuelta a España, Stage 1 to Stage 11 and 2011 Vuelta a España, Stage 12 to Stage 21

The Vuelta began with a team time trial in Benidorm. The Leopard Trek squad won this stage. Danish General Classification contender Jakob Fuglsang passed the finish line as first and was the first cyclist to wear the red leaders jersey. Fuglsang lost the leaders jersey after just one day to team-mate Daniele Bennati in a sprinter's stage which was won by Christopher Sutton of Team Sky.

Stage 3 saw the first victory out of a break-away. Out of this break-away it was Pablo Lastras (Movistar Team) who attacked on the last climb and held a small margin until the finish line in Totana. Runner-up of the stage, Sylvain Chavanel (Quick-Step), was the third cyclist who was awarded the red leaders jersey.

No serious attacks were made by the GC contenders on the first mountain stage of the Vuelta. On the climb to the Sierra Nevada it was Daniel Moreno (Team Katusha) who attacked with Chris Anker Sørensen (Saxo Bank–SunGard) and who beat the Danish climber in the sprint. Chavanel was the first rider who was awarded the leaders jersey two days in a row.

Igor Antón (Euskaltel–Euskadi) won in the 2009 Vuelta a España the stage on the steep ascend of Valdepeñas de Jaén. The Basque lost much time on stage 4 and showed no good form in the Vuelta. He couldn't repeat his stage victory. Joaquim Rodríguez (Team Katusha), a specialist on very steep hills, won the stage before the surprisingly strong Dutchman Wout Poels (Vacansoleil–DCM) and team-mate Daniel Moreno. Leader Chavanel lost several seconds but managed to keep the lead in the race.

The Liquigas team of Vincenzo Nibali rode a strong descent in the final of stage 6 and managed to form a small break-away with four Liquigas riders and former stage winner Lastras. From the four Liquigas riders Peter Sagan took his first Grand-Tour victory. Nibali failed to gain bonification seconds due to miscommunication within the team. The 2010 winner took sixteen seconds on his direct concurrents for the overall victory. The next day Sagan sprinted again for the stage victory but couldn't beat German talent Marcel Kittel (Skil–Shimano) in a sprint which was characterized by a huge crash of American sprinter Tyler Farrar (Garmin–Cervélo) in which he didn't suffer any serious injuries.

== Doping ==
On 13 June 2019, the UCI announced that Cobo's biological passport had indicated the use of performance-enhancing drugs in the period between 2009 and 2011. He was therefore considered ineligible for results. Cobo had one month to lodge an appeal against the decision. On 17 July 2019, as the time for Cobo to appeal the decision expired with no application, the UCI announced that it recognised Chris Froome as the 2011 champion. Bradley Wiggins was promoted to second place, and Bauke Mollema promoted to third.

== Classification leadership table ==
Stage	Winner	General classification	Points classification	Mountains classification	Combination Classification	Team classification	Combativity award
1	Leopard Trek	Jakob Fuglsang	no award	no award	no award	Leopard Trek	Fabian Cancellara
2	Christopher Sutton	Daniele Bennati	Christopher Sutton	Paul Martens	Jesús Rosendo	Leopard Trek	Adam Hansen
3	Pablo Lastras	Pablo Lastras	Pablo Lastras	Pablo Lastras	Pablo Lastras	Movistar Team	Sylvain Chavanel
4	Daniel Moreno	Sylvain Chavanel	Pablo Lastras	Daniel Moreno	Daniel Moreno	Team RadioShack	Thomas Rohregger
5	Joaquim Rodríguez	Sylvain Chavanel	Daniel Moreno	Daniel Moreno	Daniel Moreno	Team RadioShack	Michael Albasini
6	Peter Sagan	Sylvain Chavanel	Joaquim Rodríguez	Daniel Moreno	Daniel Moreno	Team RadioShack	Martin Kohler
7	Marcel Kittel	Sylvain Chavanel	Peter Sagan	Daniel Moreno	Daniel Moreno	Team RadioShack	Luis Ángel Maté
8	Joaquim Rodríguez	Joaquim Rodríguez	Joaquim Rodríguez	Daniel Moreno	Daniel Moreno	Team RadioShack	Adrián Palomares
9	Daniel Martin	Bauke Mollema	Joaquim Rodríguez	Daniel Martin	Bauke Mollema	Geox–TMC	Sebastian Lang
10	Tony Martin	Chris Froome	Joaquim Rodríguez	Daniel Martin	Bauke Mollema	Leopard Trek	Tony Martin
11	David Moncoutié	Bradley Wiggins	Joaquim Rodríguez	Matteo Montaguti	Bauke Mollema	Team RadioShack	Adrián Palomares
12	Peter Sagan	Bradley Wiggins	Joaquim Rodríguez	Matteo Montaguti	Bauke Mollema	Team RadioShack	Adam Hansen
13	Michael Albasini	Bradley Wiggins	Joaquim Rodríguez	David Moncoutié	Daniel Moreno	Team RadioShack	Amets Txurruka
14	Rein Taaramäe	Bradley Wiggins	Joaquim Rodríguez	David Moncoutié	Bauke Mollema	Geox–TMC	David de la Fuente
15	~~Juan José Cobo~~; Wout Poels	~~Juan José Cobo~~	Joaquim Rodríguez	David Moncoutié	~~Juan José Cobo~~	Geox–TMC	Simon Geschke
16	Juan José Haedo	~~Juan José Cobo~~	Joaquim Rodríguez	David Moncoutié	~~Juan José Cobo~~	Geox–TMC	Jesús Rosendo
17	Chris Froome	~~Juan José Cobo~~	Bauke Mollema	David Moncoutié	~~Juan José Cobo~~	Geox–TMC	Johannes Fröhlinger
18	Francesco Gavazzi	~~Juan José Cobo~~	Joaquim Rodríguez	David Moncoutié	~~Juan José Cobo~~	Geox–TMC	Sérgio Paulinho
19	Igor Antón	~~Juan José Cobo~~	Joaquim Rodríguez	David Moncoutié	~~Juan José Cobo~~	Geox–TMC	Igor Antón
20	Daniele Bennati	~~Juan José Cobo~~	Joaquim Rodríguez	David Moncoutié	~~Juan José Cobo~~	Geox–TMC	Carlos Barredo
21	Peter Sagan	~~Juan José Cobo~~	Bauke Mollema	David Moncoutié	~~Juan José Cobo~~	Geox–TMC	no award
Final		~~Juan José Cobo~~ Chris Froome	Bauke Mollema	David Moncoutié	~~Juan José Cobo~~ Chris Froome	Geox–TMC	Adrián Palomares

== Standings ==
=== General classification ===
	Rider	Team	Time
~~DSQ~~	~~Juan José Cobo (ESP)~~	~~Geox–TMC~~	84:59:31
1	Chris Froome (GBR)	Team Sky	84:59:44
2	Bradley Wiggins (GBR)	Team Sky	+ 1' 26"
3	Bauke Mollema (NED)	Rabobank	+ 1' 50"
4	Denis Menchov (RUS)	Geox–TMC	+ 3' 35"
5	Maxime Monfort (BEL)	Leopard Trek	+ 4' 00"
6	Vincenzo Nibali (ITA)	Liquigas–Cannondale	+ 4' 18"
7	Jurgen Van den Broeck (BEL)	Omega Pharma–Lotto	+ 4' 32"
8	Daniel Moreno (ESP)	Team Katusha	+ 5' 07"
9	Mikel Nieve (ESP)	Euskaltel–Euskadi	+ 5' 20"

=== Points classification ===
	Rider	Team	Points
1	Bauke Mollema (NED)	Rabobank	122
2	Joaquim Rodríguez (ESP)	Team Katusha	115
3	Daniele Bennati (ITA)	Leopard Trek	101
4	Peter Sagan (SVK)	Liquigas–Cannondale	100
DSQ	~~Juan José Cobo (ESP)~~	~~Geox–TMC~~	~~92~~
5	Chris Froome (GBR)	Team Sky	88
6	Daniel Moreno (ESP)	Team Katusha	83
7	Wout Poels (NED)	Vacansoleil–DCM	71
8	Dan Martin (IRL)	Garmin–Cervélo	70
9	Bradley Wiggins (GBR)	Team Sky	69

=== King of the Mountains classification ===
	Rider	Team	Points
1	David Moncoutié (FRA)	Cofidis	63
2	Matteo Montaguti (ITA)	Ag2r–La Mondiale	56
DSQ	~~Juan José Cobo (ESP)~~	~~Geox–TMC~~	~~42~~
3	Dan Martin (IRL)	Garmin–Cervélo	33
4	Daniel Moreno (ESP)	Team Katusha	32
5	David de la Fuente (ESP)	Geox–TMC	24
6	Nico Sijmens (BEL)	Cofidis	22
7	Chris Froome (GBR)	Team Sky	21
8	Chris Anker Sørensen (DEN)	Saxo Bank–SunGard	20
9	Koen de Kort (NED)	Skil–Shimano	19

=== Combination classification ===
	Rider	Team	Total
DSQ	~~Juan José Cobo (ESP)~~	~~Geox–TMC~~	~~9~~
1	Chris Froome (GBR)	Team Sky	16
2	Bauke Mollema (NED)	Rabobank	17
3	Daniel Moreno (ESP)	Team Katusha	21
4	Dan Martin (IRL)	Garmin–Cervélo	26
5	Wout Poels (NED)	Vacansoleil–DCM	38
6	Bradley Wiggins (GBR)	Team Sky	39
7	Joaquim Rodríguez (ESP)	Team Katusha	48
8	Chris Anker Sørensen (DEN)	Saxo Bank–SunGard	51
9	Denis Menchov (RUS)	Geox–TMC	52

=== Team classification ===
Pos.	Team	Time
1	(Spain) Geox–TMC	254h 32′ 28"
2	(Luxembourg) Leopard Trek	+ 10′ 19"
3	(Spain) Euskaltel–Euskadi	+ 16′ 44"
4	Team Katusha	+ 43' 18"
5	(France) Ag2r–La Mondiale	+ 43′ 27″
6	(Netherlands) Rabobank	+ 54′ 32″
7	(Kazakhstan) Astana	+ 58′ 56″
8	(Italy) Liquigas–Cannondale	+ 1h 01′ 51"
9	(Spain) Movistar Team	+ 1h 05′ 11″
10	(United Kingdom) Team Sky	+ 1h 09′ 45″

The UCI disqualified Juan José Cobo and Carlos Barredo from the race. If you ignore them in the daily results, Geox–TMC would drop to 3rd place, Rabobank would end up 13th, and Team RadioShack would be 10th.

=== World rankings points ===
The Vuelta was one of 27 events throughout the season that contributed points towards the 2011 UCI World Tour. Points were awarded to the top 20 finishers overall, and to the top five finishers in each stage. Only riders on UCI ProTour teams were eligible to receive rankings points, so winner Juan Cobo was not rewarded in this table.

Points earned in the Vuelta
Name	Team	Points
Chris Froome (GBR)	Team Sky	157
Bradley Wiggins (GBR)	Team Sky	108
Bauke Mollema (NED)	Rabobank	108
Maxime Monfort (BEL)	HTC–Highroad	70
Daniel Moreno (ESP)	Team Katusha	68
Vincenzo Nibali (ITA)	Liquigas–Cannondale	62
Peter Sagan (SVK)	Liquigas–Cannondale	56
Jurgen Van Den Broeck (BEL)	Omega Pharma–Lotto	54
Dan Martin (IRE)	Garmin–Cervélo	44
Mikel Nieve (ESP)	Euskaltel–Euskadi	38
Joaquim Rodríguez (ESP)	Team Katusha	38

Top ten of the individual standings after the Vuelta
Rank	Prev.	Name	Team	Points
1	2	Philippe Gilbert (BEL)	Omega Pharma–Lotto	698
2	1	Cadel Evans (AUS)	BMC Racing Team	574
3	3	Alberto Contador (ESP)	Saxo Bank–SunGard	471
4	5	Joaquim Rodríguez (ESP)	Team Katusha	366
5	4	Michele Scarponi (ITA)	Lampre–ISD	357
6	6	Samuel Sánchez (ESP)	Euskaltel–Euskadi	307
7	16	Bradley Wiggins (GBR)	Team Sky	289
8	7	Fränk Schleck (LUX)	Leopard Trek	284
9	13	Vincenzo Nibali (ITA)	Liquigas–Cannondale	272
10	17	Edvald Boasson Hagen (NOR)	Team Sky	260
