= Daniel Moreno =

Spanish road bicycle racer

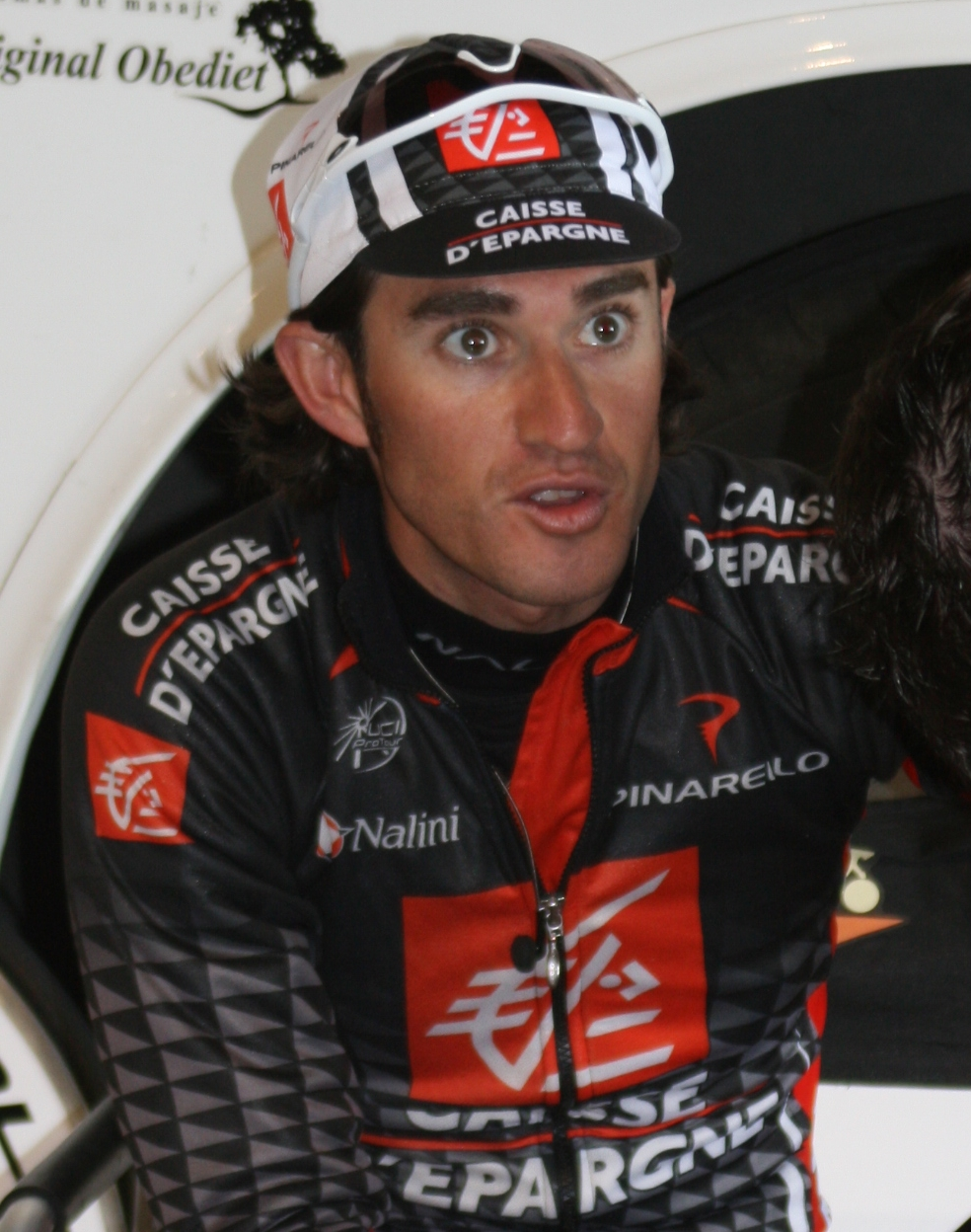
- Moreno in 2009

Personal information
- Full name: Daniel Moreno Fernández
- Nickname: Muñeco
- Born: 5 September 1981 (age 45) Madrid, Spain
- Height: 1.73 m (5 ft 8 in)
- Weight: 59 kg (130 lb; 9.3 st)

Cycling career
- Sport: Cycling
- Current team: Retired
- Discipline: Road
- Role: Rider
- Rider type: Climber

Amateur teams
- 2003–2004: Alcosto–Fuenlabrada
- 2003: Alcobaça CC–De Borla–Ruben & Rita
- 2004: Relax–Bodysol (stagiaire)

Professional teams
- 2005–2007: Relax–Fuenlabrada
- 2008–2009: Caisse d'Epargne
- 2010: Omega Pharma–Lotto
- 2011–2015: Team Katusha
- 2016–2017: Movistar Team
- 2018: EF Education First–Drapac p/b Cannondale

Major wins
- Grand Tours Vuelta a España 3 individual stages (2011, 2013) Stage races Vuelta a Burgos (2012) One-day races and Classics Gran Piemonte (2011) GP Miguel Induráin (2012) La Flèche Wallonne (2013)
Medal record
Representing Spain
Men's road bicycle racing
European Championships
Bronze medal – third place	2016 Plumelec	Road race

Daniel Moreno Fernández (born 5 September 1981) is a Spanish former professional road racing cyclist, who rode professionally between 2005 and 2018 for the Relax–GAM, Omega Pharma–Lotto, Team Katusha, Movistar Team and EF Education First–Drapac p/b Cannondale teams. He specialised in mountain and high-mountain races along with Grand Tours like the Giro d'Italia and Vuelta a España, winning three stages of the latter in 2011 and 2013.

== Career ==
=== Amateur career ===
In 2003, Moreno was a member of the Alcosto–Fuenlabrada team, and he won the Volta a Portugal do Futuro. From September 2004, Moreno rode as a stagiaire with Relax–Bodysol. At his very first race, the annual Tour of Britain, he achieved a prominent result by finishing 5th in the general classification.

=== Relax–Fuenlabrada (2005–07) ===
In 2005, he remained full-time with Relax–Fuenlabrada. He advanced further by ranking 2nd at the Clásica de Ordizia and the Vuelta a Andalucía.

In 2006, he achieved his first victories by taking stage wins at the Clásica Internacional de Alcobendas and the Volta ao Alentejo. He supplemented his triumphs with three podiums at the Volta ao Alentejo, the Clásica Internacional de Alcobendas and the Vuelta a Burgos.

In 2007 it also turned out to be successful year for Moreno. He won stages at the Tour de San Luis, Vuelta a Chihuahua, and the Escalada a Montjuïc. Along with that, he showed himself to good advantage by taking 2nd place in a stage of the Vuelta a España and, thus, reaching 12th position in the final general classification. In September he announced his move to French team Agritubel for the next year but then Moreno renounced his own statement.

However, with the collapse of Relax–GAM in late 2007, the rider lost his permanent contract together with an opportunity to compete at professional races.

=== 2008–10 ===
Moreno managed to return to the peloton only in March 2008 after signing a contract with the Spanish team Caisse d'Epargne.

There he spent two seasons (2008–2009) working as a domestique for Alejandro Valverde and then moved to Omega Pharma–Lotto for a year.

=== Team Katusha (2011–15) ===
==== 2011 ====
In 2011 he joined Russian Team Katusha and became a domestique for his team leader, Joaquim Rodríguez. Accompanying Rodríguez in mountain races, Moreno managed to win several significant competitions including the Giro del Piemonte and the Vuelta a Burgos. On 23 August he triumphed in stage 4 of the Vuelta a España, joining the lone escapee of Chris Anker Sørensen in the final kilometres. Sorensen had been part of an earlier break and Moreno sat on his wheel, attacking in the final 400 metres (1,300 ft) as the peloton was charging behind. The next day he successfully assisted Rodríguez at Valdepeñas de Jaén. The coordinated performance of the two Spaniards brought Moreno to 3rd place while Rodríguez topped the podium. During all three weeks of the racem Moreno rode at his best and, thus, ranked 9th in the general classification. In October, Moreno won the Italian classic Giro del Piemonte, after shaking off the leading group of thirteen after the flamme rouge on an uphill false flat.

==== 2012 ====
In 2012 Moreno kept on going forward. He triumphed at the GP Miguel Induráin, took first place on stage 4 of the Vuelta a Andalucía and won 2 stages of the Critérium du Dauphiné. Moreno also firmly assisted Rodríguez to second overall at the Giro d'Italia. The Vuelta a España and other home races were among his top priorities for the ongoing season.

He went on to win the 2.HC classified Vuelta a Burgos, surviving a scare in the last stage after getting dropped on the Lagunas de Neila mountain finish by two serious overall classification contenders, Colombians Esteban Chaves of Colombia–Coldeportes and Sergio Henao of Team Sky. Moreno ultimately limited his losses to 22 seconds on that stage, retaining the leader's jersey by 10 seconds over Henao. He also won 2 stages and the points classification at the race.

He also had a solid 5th-place finish in the Vuelta a España, where he helped his team leader Rodríguez in the mountain stages; Rodríguez took third overall.

==== 2013 ====
In 2013, Moreno won the World Tour race La Flèche Wallonne, after following an attack initiated by Philippe Gilbert (BMC Racing Team) on the final climb, the Mur de Huy. He passed Gilbert and Carlos Betancur (Ag2r–La Mondiale) to grab the victory. He later continued his good form into the Critérium du Dauphiné where he finished 3rd overall. At the Vuelta a España, he won stages 4 and 9 and finished 10th in the final general classification.

=== Movistar Team (2016–17) ===
In October 2015, Movistar Team announced that they had signed Moreno on a two-year contract from 2016.

=== EF Education First–Drapac (2018) ===
In November 2017, it was announced that Moreno was to join the EF Education First–Drapac p/b Cannondale team for the 2018 season.

== Major results ==
2004
5th Overall Tour of Britain
2005
2nd Overall Vuelta a Andalucía
2nd Prueba Villafranca de Ordizia
6th Clásica a los Puertos de Guadarrama
2006
2nd Overall Volta ao Alentejo

1st Stage 3

3rd Overall Clásica Internacional de Alcobendas

1st Stage 1

3rd Overall Vuelta a Burgos
4th Prueba Villafranca de Ordizia
4th Subida al Naranco
7th Overall Vuelta a Asturias
2007
1st Overall Escalada a Montjuïc

1st Stages 1a & 1b (ITT)

1st Stage 5 Tour de San Luis
1st Stage 4 Vuelta a Chihuahua
2nd Overall Clásica Internacional de Alcobendas
3rd Clásica a los Puertos de Guadarrama
4th Overall Vuelta a Burgos
5th Subida a Urkiola
7th Overall Vuelta por un Chile Líder
7th Gran Premio de Llodio
9th Circuito de Getxo
2008
6th Overall Vuelta a La Rioja
9th Overall Euskal Bizikleta

1st Stage 1

9th Overall Vuelta a Burgos
2009
2nd Overall Tour de Pologne
2nd Gran Piemonte
2nd Japan Cup
5th Overall Vuelta a Chihuahua

1st Stage 4

6th Prueba Villafranca de Ordizia
7th Subida al Naranco
10th GP Miguel Induráin
2010
8th Clásica de Almería
10th Brabantse Pijl
2011
1st Gran Piemonte
2nd Overall Vuelta a Burgos

1st Stage 4

2nd Prueba Villafranca de Ordizia
3rd Coppa Sabatini
8th La Flèche Wallonne
9th Overall Vuelta a España

1st Stage 4

9th Trofeo Deià
2012
1st Overall Vuelta a Burgos

1st Points classification
1st Stages 1 & 2

1st GP Miguel Induráin
Critérium du Dauphiné

1st Stages 2 & 7

1st Stage 4 Vuelta a Andalucía
5th Overall Vuelta a España
2013
1st La Flèche Wallonne
3rd Overall Critérium du Dauphiné
3rd Milano–Torino
4th Gran Premio Industria e Commercio di Prato
6th Giro di Lombardia
10th Overall Vuelta a España

1st Stages 4 & 9

2014
2nd Overall Vuelta a Burgos

1st Points classification

3rd Milano–Torino
5th Gran Premio Industria e Commercio di Prato
8th Overall Tirreno–Adriatico
9th Amstel Gold Race
9th La Flèche Wallonne
9th Liège–Bastogne–Liège
10th Overall Tour of Oman
2015
1st Prologue (TTT) Tour of Austria
2nd Giro di Lombardia
3rd Overall Vuelta a Burgos

1st Points classification
1st Stage 5

4th Clásica de San Sebastián
5th La Flèche Wallonne
6th Overall Tour de San Luis
6th GP Miguel Induráin
9th Overall Vuelta a España
9th Milano–Torino
10th Liège–Bastogne–Liège
2016
3rd Road race, UEC European Road Championships
3rd Overall Vuelta a Asturias

1st Points classification
1st Stage 3

4th Milano–Torino
8th Overall Vuelta a España
2017
4th Road race, National Road Championships
7th Overall Vuelta a Burgos

=== Grand Tour general classification results timeline ===
Grand Tour	2006	2007	2008	2009	2010	2011	2012	2013	2014	2015	2016	2017	2018
Giro d'Italia	—	—	—	—	26	29	20	—	41	—	—	—	—
Tour de France	—	—	—	—	21	—	—	17	—	—	31	—	—
Vuelta a España	36	12	12	11	—	9	5	10	11	9	8	18	38

Legend
—	Did not compete
DNF	Did not finish
