= Pablo Lastras =

Spanish cyclist

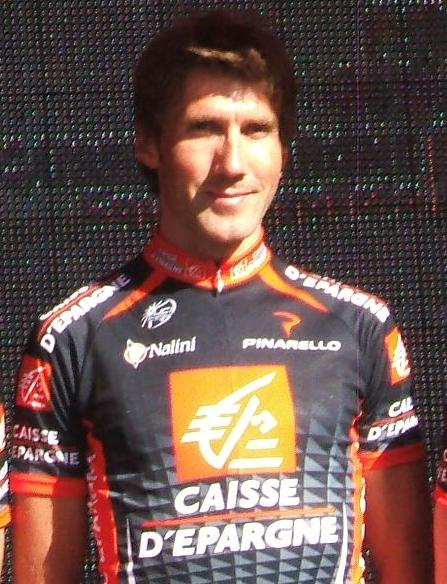
- Lastras at the 2009 Tour Down Under.

Personal information
- Full name: Pablo Lastras García
- Born: 20 January 1976 (age 50) Madrid, Spain
- Height: 1.83 m (6 ft 0 in)
- Weight: 68 kg (150 lb)

Cycling career
- Sport: Cycling
- Current team: Movistar Team
- Discipline: Road
- Role: Rider (former); Directeur sportif
- Rider type: Domestique

Professional teams
- 1997: Banesto (stagiaire)
- 1998–2015: Banesto

Managerial team
- 2017–: Movistar Team

Major wins
- Grand Tours Tour de France 1 individual stage (2003) Giro d'Italia 1 individual stage (2001) Vuelta a España 3 individual stages (2002, 2011)

Pablo Lastras García (born 20 January 1976) is a Spanish former racing cyclist, who rode professionally between 1998 and 2015, entirely for the Banesto team and its later iterations. During his career, he recorded stage victories at the three Grand Tours, winning five stages in total.

He now works as a directeur sportif for the team.

== Career ==
Born in Madrid, Lastras' idols are Bernard Hinault and Miguel Induráin. As a competitor, the 1.83-metre (6 ft 0 in) tall Lastras had a resting heart rate of 45bpm, and weighed 68 kg (150 lb).

Lastras won a stage in the 2003 Tour de France and picked up two stages in the 2002 Vuelta a España. In 2005 he won stage 8 at Tour de Suisse. He also won the Vuelta a Burgos in 2003. In 2007 the team Caisse d'Epargne had announced that they would let him go, but after a stage win in Eneco Tour his contract was renewed for another year. That off-season, in November 2007, Lastras won the second annual Criterium Ciudad de Jaén race, an unofficial two-day competition. In 2008, he won the overall classification in Vuelta a Andalucía, and placed second in a stage of the Giro d'Italia. In 2011, Lastras won stage 3 of the Vuelta a España.

In October 2015, after 18 years as a professional, Lastras announced that he had retired from racing after struggling to recover from pelvic injuries he had sustained in a crash at the Volta a Catalunya in March of that year. He competed in a total of 17 Grand Tours and 29 classics, and took a total of 13 professional victories.

Following his recovery from his accident, in October 2016 it was announced that Lastras would return to Movistar as part of the squad's management team from 2017, becoming a directeur sportif.

== Major results ==
1999
1st Stage 2a Troféu Joaquim Agostinho
1st Stage 12 Volta a Portugal
2000
10th Overall GP do Minho

1st Stage 4

2001
1st Memorial Manuel Galera
1st Stage 11 Giro d'Italia
1st Stage 4 (TTT) Volta a Portugal
3rd Overall GP CTT Correios de Portugal
3rd Giro della Toscana
9th Overall Tour de l'Avenir
2002
Vuelta a España

1st Stages 9 & 11

1st Stage 1 (TTT) Volta a Portugal
7th Clásica de Almería
7th Giro di Lombardia
2003
1st Overall Vuelta a Burgos
1st Stage 18 Tour de France
1st Stage 2 (TTT) Vuelta a Castilla y León
4th Milano–Torino
2004
6th Subida al Naranco
9th Overall Volta a Catalunya

1st Stage 1 (TTT)

10th Trofeo Luis Puig
2005
1st Stage 8 Tour de Suisse
4th Japan Cup
2006
4th Clásica a los Puertos de Guadarrama
6th Overall Escalada a Montjuïc
10th Overall Deutschland Tour
2007
1st Stage 6 Eneco Tour
6th Overall Tour de Pologne
2008
1st Overall Vuelta a Andalucía
2009
5th Trofeo Calvià
5th Japan Cup
8th Paris–Tours
9th Overall Tour de Pologne
10th Giro del Piemonte
2010
3rd Prueba Villafranca de Ordizia
3rd Giro di Lombardia
2011
1st Stage 3 Vuelta a España
3rd Prueba Villafranca de Ordizia
7th Overall Vuelta a Burgos

1st Stage 3 (TTT)

2014
7th Overall Tour de Wallonie
9th Vuelta a La Rioja

=== Grand Tour general classification results timeline ===
Grand Tour	2001	2002	2003	2004	2005	2006	2007	2008	2009	2010	2011	2012	2013
Giro d'Italia	49	—	—	—	—	—	42	64	45	113	38	DNF	85
Tour de France	—	—	67	—	—	—	—	—	—	—	—	—	—
Vuelta a España	—	17	55	38	19	48	—	—	—	—	44	74	DNF

Legend
—	Did not compete
DNF	Did not finish
