= Eros Capecchi =

Italian road bicycle racer

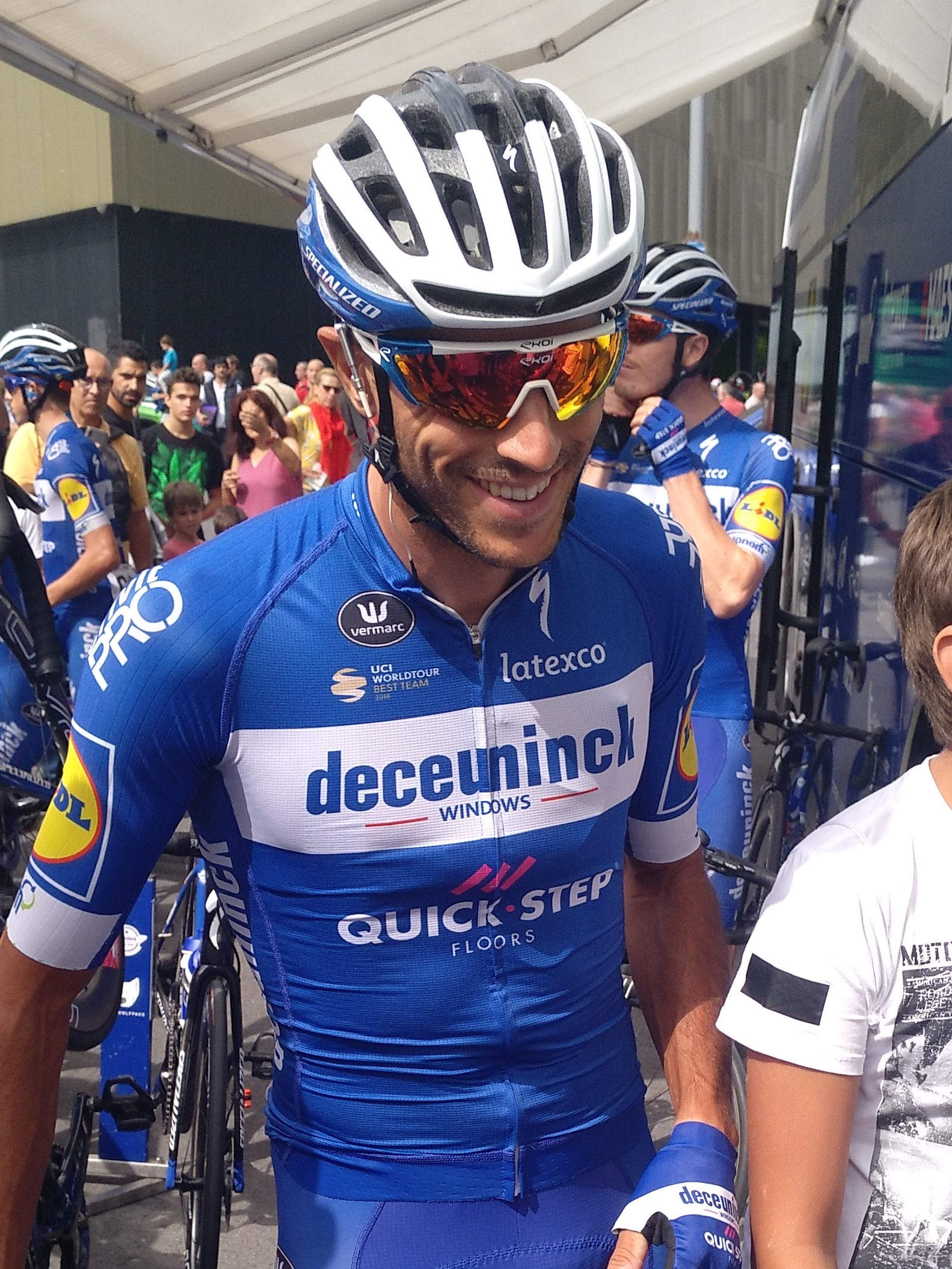
- Capecchi at the 2019 Vuelta a España.

Personal information
- Full name: Eros Capecchi
- Born: 13 June 1986 (age 40) Castiglione del Lago, Italy
- Height: 1.83 m (6 ft 0 in)
- Weight: 66 kg (146 lb)

Cycling career
- Sport: Cycling
- Current team: Team Bahrain Victorious
- Discipline: Road
- Role: Rider
- Rider type: Climber

Professional teams
- 2005–2007: Liquigas–Bianchi
- 2008–2010: Saunier Duval–Scott
- 2011–2012: Liquigas–Cannondale
- 2013–2015: Movistar Team
- 2016: Astana
- 2017–2019: Quick-Step Floors
- 2020–2021: Bahrain–McLaren

Major wins
- Grand Tours Giro d'Italia 1 individual stage (2011)

Eros Capecchi (born 13 June 1986) is an Italian former professional road bicycle racer, who last rode for UCI WorldTeam Team Bahrain Victorious. He took four professional wins during his career, including a stage of the 2011 Giro d'Italia.

== Career ==
Born in Castiglione del Lago, Capecchi turned professional with Liquigas–Bianchi in 2005 before moving to Saunier Duval–Scott in 2008. He returned to Liquigas–Cannondale for the 2011 season. He took a notable victory at the Gran Premio di Lugano in 2012, dropping a dozen riders in the finale, and finished with a 4-second advantage over them. He left Liquigas–Cannondale at the end of the 2012 season, and joined the Movistar Team on a two-year contract, from the 2013 season onwards. Capecchi signed for Quick-Step Floors for the 2017 season. He joined Bahrain–McLaren in 2020. He retired from competition at the end of the 2021 season, after his contract was not extended.

== Major results ==
2004
1st Road race, National Junior Road Championships
2005
3rd Ruota d'Oro
2006
8th Down Under Classic
9th Overall Tour de Luxembourg
2007
1st Stage 1 (TTT) Settimana Ciclistica Lombarda
2008
1st Overall Euskal Bizikleta

1st Stage 3

9th Overall Deutschland Tour
2009
6th Giro dell'Appennino
2011
1st Stage 18 Giro d'Italia
4th Overall Tour de San Luis
2012
1st Gran Premio di Lugano
4th Giro dell'Appennino
5th Overall Tour of Beijing
8th Overall Vuelta a Burgos
2013
6th Overall Tour de Pologne
2014
10th Overall Tour de Suisse
2016
1st Stage 1 (TTT) Giro del Trentino
1st Stage 2 (TTT) Vuelta a Burgos

=== Grand Tour general classification results timeline ===
Grand Tour	2008	2009	2010	2011	2012	2013	2014	2015	2016	2017	2018	2019	2020
Giro d'Italia	99	DNF	DNF	60	37	70	82	—	82	58	49	37	87
Tour de France	—	—	83	—	—	—	—	—	—	—	—	—	—
/ Vuelta a España	—	DNF	—	21	25	24	—	—	—	104	—	121	—

Legend
—	Did not compete
DNF	Did not finish
