= David de la Fuente =

Spanish racing cyclist

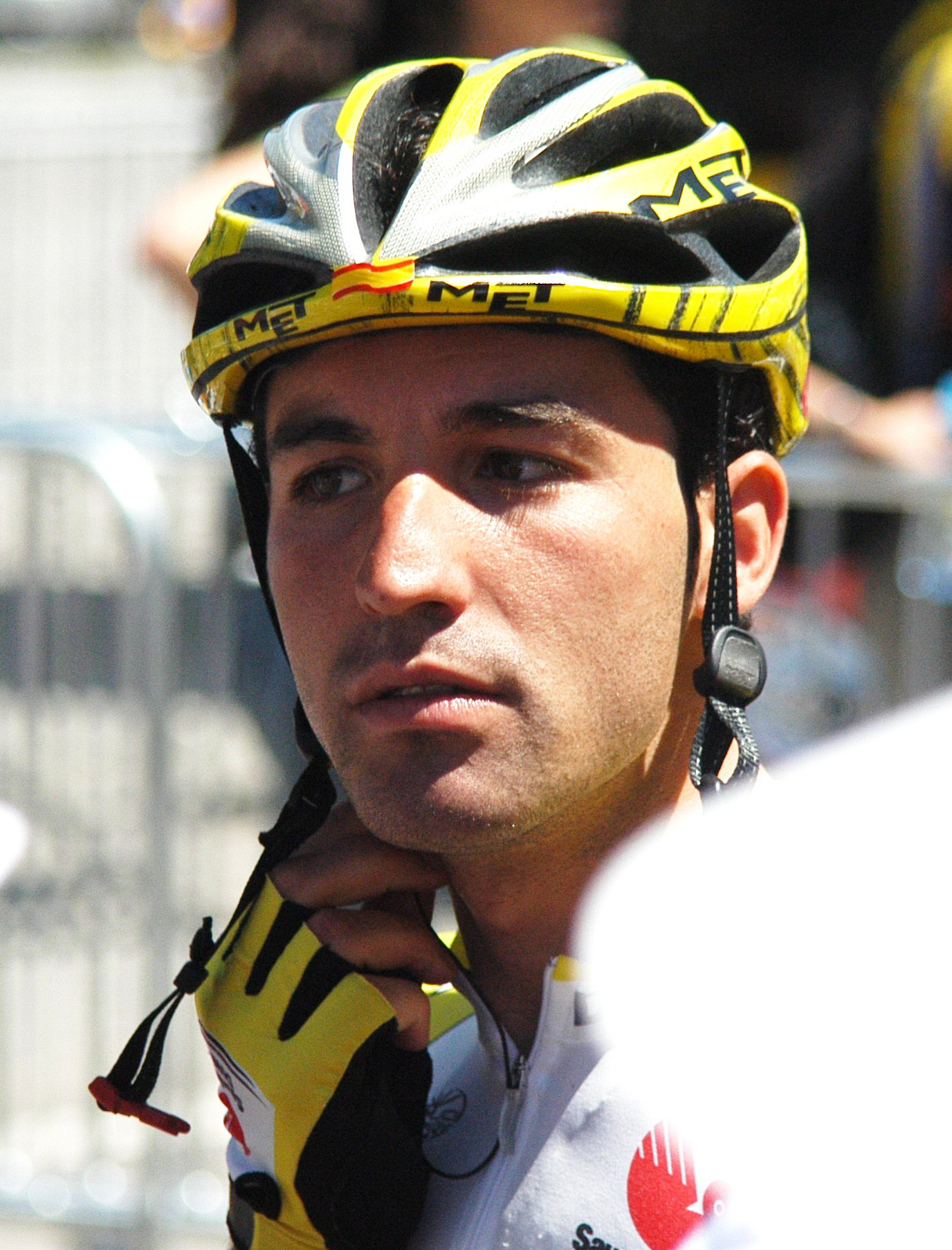
- De la Fuente in the 2007 Tour de France

Personal information
- Full name: David de la Fuente Rasilla
- Born: 4 May 1981 (age 45) Reinosa, Spain
- Height: 1.74 m (5 ft 9 in)
- Weight: 65 kg (143 lb)

Cycling career
- Sport: Cycling
- Current team: Aviludo–Louletano–Loulé
- Discipline: Road
- Role: Rider
- Rider type: Climbing specialist

Amateur team
- 2000–2002: Saunier Duval–Mapei

Professional teams
- 2003: Vini Caldirola
- 2004–2009: Saunier Duval–Prodir
- 2010: Astana
- 2011: Geox–TMC
- 2012: Caja Rural
- 2013–2014: Torku Şekerspor
- 2015: Efapel
- 2016: Sporting / Tavira
- 2017–: Louletano–Hospital de Loulé

Major wins
- Tour de France Combativity award (2006); GP Miguel Induráin (2009)

David de la Fuente Rasilla (born 4 May 1981 in Reinosa, Cantabria) is a Spanish professional road bicycle racer, who currently rides for UCI Continental team Aviludo–Louletano–Loulé. De la Fuente led the mountains classification of the 2006 Tour de France for a number of stages, donning the Polka Dot jersey after stage 2, and then again after stage 11 until Michael Rasmussen took a commanding lead in the competition. For his numerous attacks, de la Fuente was subsequently awarded the combativity award.

== Major results ==
2001
1st Stage 5 Circuito Montañés
2004
8th Clásica de Almería
2005
3rd Trofeo Calvià
6th Circuito de Getxo
2006
Tour de France

1st Overall combativity award
Held after Stages 2, 11–15
Combativity award Stages 2 & 11

2007
1st GP Llodio
1st Mountains classification Volta a la Comunitat Valenciana
6th Trofeo Pollença
9th Klasika Primavera
10th Clásica de Almería
2008
1st Stage 2 Deutschland Tour
Tour de France

Held after Stages 7–9

7th GP Llodio
8th Gran Premio Miguel Induráin
2009
1st GP Miguel Induráin
2nd GP Llodio
8th Subida a Urkiola
10th Overall Volta a Catalunya
2011
Combativity award Stage 14 Vuelta a España
8th Coppa Sabatini
2012
6th Grand Prix de Plumelec-Morbihan
2013
1st Stage 2 Tour of Qinghai Lake
2015
1st Stage 3 Troféu Joaquim Agostinho
2016
3rd Overall Volta ao Alentejo
10th Overall GP Liberty Seguros

1st Mountains classification

2017
10th Overall Troféu Joaquim Agostinho
2018
1st Mountains classification Troféu Joaquim Agostinho
3rd Overall Grande Prémio de Portugal N2
10th Clássica Aldeias do Xisto
2019
3rd Clássica da Arrábida

=== Grand Tour general classification results timeline ===
Grand Tour	2003	2004	2005	2006	2007	2008	2009	2010	2011	2012
Giro d'Italia	Has not contested during his career									
Tour de France	—	—	—	56	49	DNF	—	106	—	—
Vuelta a España	156	—	DNF	71	96	—	24	—	35	65

Legend
—	Did not compete
DNF	Did not finish
