= Juan José Cobo =

Spanish cyclist (born 1981)

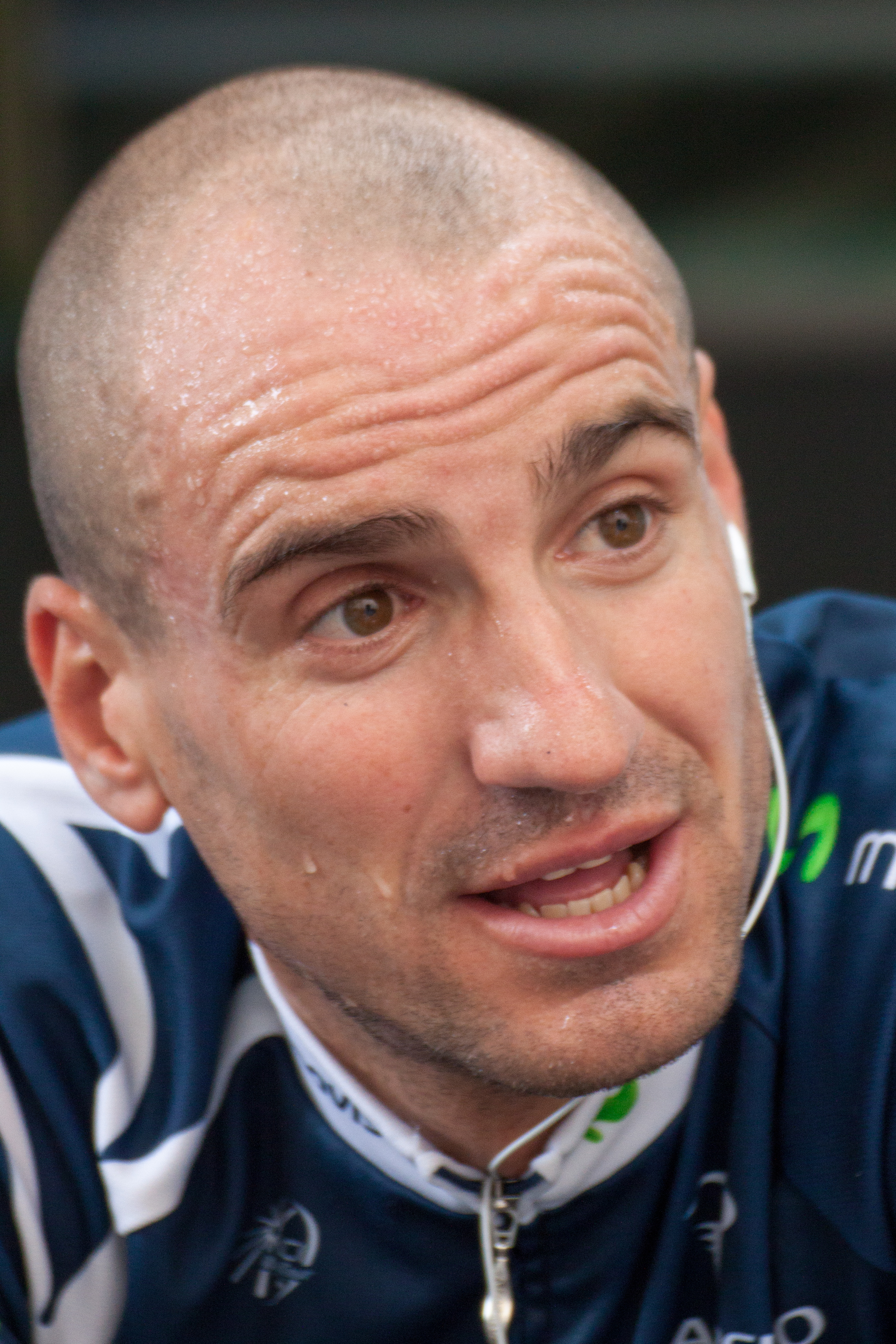
- Cobo at the 2012 Critérium du Dauphiné

Personal information
- Full name: Juan José Cobo Acebo
- Nickname: El Bisonte de La Pesa
- Born: 21 February 1981 (age 45) Torrelavega, Cantabria, Spain
- Height: 1.75 m (5 ft 9 in)
- Weight: 69 kg (152 lb)

Cycling career
- Sport: Cycling
- Discipline: Road
- Role: Rider
- Rider type: Climber/Time-Trialist

Amateur teams
- 2002: Saunier Duval
- 2003: Vini Caldirola-So.Di (stagiaire)

Professional teams
- 2004–2009: Saunier Duval–Prodir
- 2010: Caisse d'Epargne
- 2011: Geox–TMC
- 2012–2013: Movistar Team
- 2014: Torku Şekerspor

Major wins
- Grand Tours Tour de France 1 individual stage (2008) Stage Races Tour of the Basque Country (2007)

Juan José Cobo Acebo (born 21 February 1981 in Torrelavega, Cantabria) is a retired Spanish professional road racing cyclist. He won the 2011 Vuelta a España as a Geox–TMC rider, his first and only major title but in July 2019 he was stripped of this title after being found guilty of doping by the UCI. He was considered a climber who also is able to time trial.

On 13 June 2019, the UCI stated that Cobo had been found guilty of a doping violation, based on his biological passport data.

== Biography ==
In 2003, Cobo won the Spanish under-23 time-trial championships. He was selected for the national team in the European Championships, in Athens in August, and for the World Championships in Hamilton, Canada, in October. At the European Championships, he finished fourth, 30 seconds behind the winner Markus Fothen. At the World Championships, he participated, with Isidro Nozal, in the time-trial in which he took the 33rd place. In September, he joined the professional team Vini Caldirola as a trainee.

In 2004, Cobo became professional in the new Spanish team Saunier Duval–Prodir, led by Mauro Gianetti, manager of Vini Caldirola in 2003 . His best result this season was ninth place in the Japan Cup.

In 2005, he participated in his first grand tour, the Giro d'Italia.

In 2007, he won the Tour of the Basque Country, taking two stage victories in the process. He grabbed the leader's jersey on the first stage, which he won, and had to relinquish it to Relax–GAM's Ángel Vicioso on Stage 3. Another victory on stage 5 netted him the overall lead once again and he did resist the time trial on stage 6 to take the Tour's honors. Cobo then participated in the Tour de France with hopes for a stage victory. That did not materialize, but he finished the Tour in 20th position.

In 2008, still with Saunier Duval, he made a quieter start to the season but finished second in the Tour de France Hautacam stage, behind his teammate Leonardo Piepoli. Despite this strong performance, in what was the first major mountain stage of the Tour de France, Cobo was forced to leave the Tour with his team following the positive control of the Italian Riccardo Riccò. He later was attributed the stage win since Piepoli has been stripped of it for doping. Saunier Duval became Scott-American Beef late in the season, but this team was not invited to the Vuelta a España.

The team became Fuji-Servetto at the beginning of the 2009 season. Cobo stayed faithful, which allowed him to assume responsibility as a team leader, finishing 10th at the Vuelta a España where he also won a stage. He did not participate in the Tour de France as his team was not invited by the organizers. He represented Spain in the 2009 UCI Road World Championships – Men's time trial in Mendrisio.

In 2011, his team Geox–TMC started the Vuelta a España with a wildcard invitation. Cobo was selected to ride the race as a helper for team leader Denis Menchov. After winning the 15th stage on the steep ascent of the Angliru he became the leader of both the race and his team. Cobo kept the lead for the rest of the race resisting attacks by Chris Froome who finished second by just 13 seconds. Especially fierce was the attack Froome produced in the last kilometer of the seventeenth stage, Cobo was dropped for some time before he rallied and made the juncture very shortly before the finish line.

After Geox–TMC folded at the end of 2011, Cobo joined Movistar Team for the 2012 season. He had a year without victories, participating in the Tour de France and landing a 30th general classification placing. He was slated to be his team's leader at the Vuelta a España to defend his title, but the leadership was soon shifted to Alejandro Valverde, after the latter performed better than Cobo in the early stages. Cobo helped Valverde finish in second position, while he finished 67th.

Cobo left the Movistar Team at the end of the 2013 season, and joined Torku Şekerspor for the 2014 season. He retired after that season.

On 18 June 2019, due to findings from his biological passport, which indicated use of performance-enhancing drugs, Cobo was stripped of his Vuelta victory as well as all other results between 29 August 2009 and 27 September 2009 as well as between 20 August 2011 and 11 September 2011, meaning he also lost his 10th place at the 2009 Vuelta. As Cobo did not appeal within 30 days, he was also stripped of his 2011 Vuelta win on 18 July 2019.

== Career achievements ==
=== Major results ===
2003
1st Time trial, National Under–23 Road Championships
1st Stage 5b (ITT) Vuelta a Navarra
2004
9th Japan Cup
2005
10th Coppa Placci
2007
1st Overall Tour of the Basque Country

1st Stages 1 & 5

3rd Overall Vuelta a Castilla y León
3rd Subida a Urkiola
5th Gran Premio Miguel Indurain
9th Liège–Bastogne–Liège
2008
1st Stage 10 Tour de France
2nd Subida a Urkiola
4th Overall Volta a Portugal

1st Stage 9

6th Overall Vuelta a Burgos

1st Stage 5

2009
9th Giro di Lombardia
~~10th Overall Vuelta a España~~

~~1st Stage 19~~

10th Overall Vuelta a Castilla y León

1st Stage 4

2011
~~1st Overall Vuelta a España~~

~~1st Combination classification~~
~~1st Stage 15~~

3rd Trofeo Deià
3rd Overall Vuelta a Burgos
8th Trofeo Inca
9th Memorial Marco Pantani
2014
6th Overall Tour of Turkey

=== Grand Tour general classification results timeline ===
Grand Tour	2005	2006	2007	2008	2009	2010	2011	2012	2013
Giro d'Italia	DNF	—	—	—	—	—	—	—	116
Tour de France	—	—	20	DNF	—	—	—	30	—
Vuelta a España	—	DNF	—	—	~~10~~	—	~~1~~	67	—

Legend
—	Did not compete
DNF	Did not finish
