= Valdepeñas de Jaén =

- city
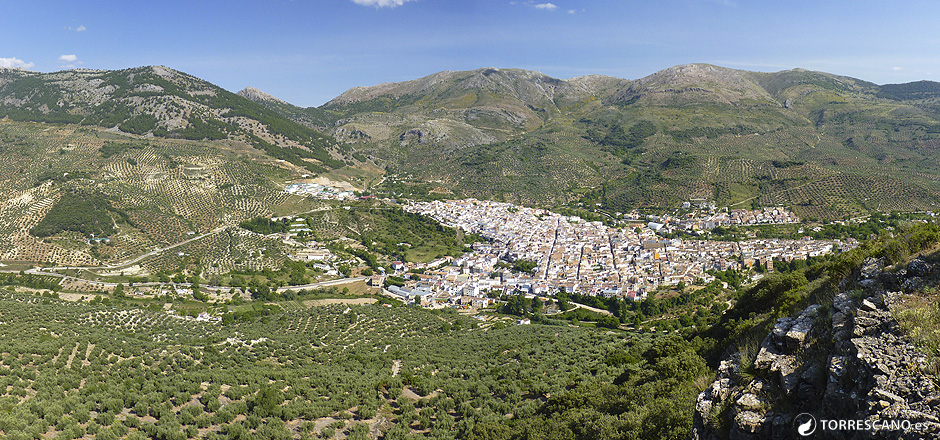

- Flag Coat of arms

- Location in the Province of Jaén Valdepeñas de Jaén (Andalusia) Valdepeñas de Jaén (Spain)
- Coordinates: 37°35′N 3°49′W
- Country: Spain
- Autonomous community: Andalusia
- Province: Jaén
- Comarca: Sierra Sur

Government
  - Mayor: María de la Paz del Moral Milla

Area
  - Total: 183.80 km^{2} (70.97 sq mi)
- Elevation: 920 m (3,020 ft)

Population (2025-01-01)
  - Total: 3,469
  - Density: 18.87/km^{2} (48.88/sq mi)
- Demonym: Valdepeñeros
- Time zone: UTC+1 (CET)
  - Summer (DST): UTC+2 (CEST)
- Website: Official website

Valdepeñas de Jaén is a city located in the province of Jaén, Spain. According to the 2005 census (INE), the city had a population of 4,315.

Valdepeñas de Jaén is a Spanish municipality in the Sierra Sur region, southwest of the province of Jaén, Andalusia. According to INE data, in 2018 it had 3,799 inhabitants. Its surface area is 183 km^{2} (71 sq mi) and has a density of 20.75 inhabitants / km². Its geographical coordinates are 37 ° 35 ′ N, 3 ° 49 ′ W. It is located at an altitude of 920 meters and 31 kilometers from the provincial capital, Jaén.

Located within the mountain ranges of the Subbetic Zone, the area is thickly forested and boasts magnificent holm oak groves. It bounded by the Sierra de la Pandera to the north and the Alta Coloma mountain range to the south. From the Sierra de la Morenilla to the south, the neighbouring towns of Martos, Alcalá la Real and several others can be seen. Road access is provided via the A-6050 (Jaén – Los Villares – Valdepeñas de Jaén – Castillo de Locubín).

The town of Valdepeñas de Jaén was founded in 1539 as part of the repopulation of the mountain areas of Jaén following the reintegration of the kingdom of Granada after the Islamic period. The new town was designed and built according to Renaissance principles of town planning, which are till apparent today in the grid layout of its streets. By 1550 the town was fully populated under the jurisdiction of the City of Jaén, and following a request to King Felipe II by the municipal council, was recognised as an independent town within the kingdom of Castile in 1558. In 1629, in the reign of Felipe IV, the jurisdictional lordship of Valdepeñas was sold to Antonio Álvarez de Bohorques, Marquesado de los Trujillos, Major Ensign of the City of Granada, who in turn sold it to Dalmau de Queralt, Count of Santa Coloma, in 1643. The municipal council did not recognise the jurisdiction of the "Lords of Valdepeñas", and opposed seigneurial authority throughout the seventeenth century until the matter was resolved in favour of the municipal council in 1785. In 1917, the town of Valdepeñas was declared a city by H.M. King D. Alfonso XIII. The Christ of Chircales has been the focus of religious observance in Valdepeñas de Jaén since the sixteenth century and is celebrated from September 1 to 5 of each year. Since 1940, a pilgrimage has been held at the shrine of Chircales on the first Sunday in May. The pilgrimage was recently declared to be part of the Intangible Heritage of Andalucía.

Valdepeñas' Parish Church of Santiago Apóstol (ss. XVI–XVII) was designed by the architect and sculptor Juan de Reolid in 1539 and was completed at the end of the 16th century. Several stonemasons-architects worked on the building, including Cristóbal del Castillo. Further work was carried out in the seventeenth century by Juan de Aranda Salazar. The church suffered significant damage in the Spanish Civil War and was restored by the architect Ramón Pajares Pardo in 1952. It now consists of three naves with a main chapel. There are also two 18th-century chapels with dressing rooms. The one on the side of the gospel, of Nuestro Padre Jesús Nazareno, and that of the epistle, of Our Lady of the Rosary, now the Chapel of the Sacred Heart of Jesus. The altarpiece in the main chapel, completed by Sebastián de Solís In 1597, disappeared in the Civil War. It was replaced in 1962 by the sculptor Julio Pajares Vilches and the cabinetmaker Felipe Cobo Campos, with paintings by Francisco Cerezo Moreno. The Parish Archive, the silverware collection, a carving of San José (18th century, the work of Francisco Calvo Bustamante), the images of Nuestro Padre Jesús Nazareno, and of the Christ of Medinaceli or of the Sentencia (both by the sculptor Francisco Malo Guerrero) and that of the Immaculate Conception (19th-20th century, by Pío Mollar Franch) are among the artefacts kept in the church.

Located in the Chircales area, a few kilometers from the town centre, the Sanctuary of Cristo de Chircales dates from the Middle Ages and is mentioned for the first time in Alfonso XI of Castille's hunting manual, the 'Libro de la Montería'. In 1566, a resident of Valdepeñas, Juan Ruiz Castellano, donated land for the construction of a hermits' sanctuary "next to some stone villages of old buildings." There are up to twelve rock hermitages of different size and interest around the church of the Sanctuary, the largest of which is adjacent to the main building. This endowment gave rise to a religious foundation in the tradition of Juan de Ávila and his disciples, who had trained at the University of Baeza. Secular and religious hermits lived in the hermitage, presided over by a priest as chaplain and patron of the foundation. Between 1590 and 1609 the church was built, and since at least 1606 has housed the painting of Christ of Chircales, by an anonymous artist. Devotion to the Christ of Chircales increased subsequently, and after Church lands were confiscated in the nineteenth century, various brotherhoods emerged, of which two currently survive, that of Jaén and that of Valdepeñas de Jaén.

The Santa Ana Mill Museum is a hydraulic flour mill that began to function in 1540, though it has medieval origins. From 1566, it was linked to the estate of the Arceo-Gamboa family, who had the right to use the water for the mills, in exchange for the payment of an annual income of seventy bushels of wheat to the Valdepeñas Council. The mill was restored in 2001, and now houses an ethnological museum. It also hosts cultural, artistic and gastronomic activities.

== Hermitage of San Sebastián (17th century – 1807) ==
The Hermitage of San Sebastián is situated on the former Common, adjacent to the exit to Jaén. Founded in the seventeenth century, it was dedicated to Saint Sebastian, a traditional intercessor against epidemics, and in times of plague and other infections may have served as a checkpoint for travellers entering the town. In 1693, Don Juan Ibáñez de Robles, a canon of Jaén Cathedral, arranged for Masses to be celebrated there during the harvest. The chapel was rebuilt at his own expense by Bishop Fray Diego Melo of Portugal in 1807, with an annexed cemetery, one of the oldest in the province of Jaén. The hermitage, which was designed by the architects Gregorio Manuel López and Miguel de Landeras in a neoclassical style, has a Latin cross plan, following the architectural models of the Iglesia del Sagrario (Jaén) of the Cathedral of Jaén.

The Bridge of Santa Ana, probably medieval in origin, is also called Dehesa or del Hundidero. It is located a few meters from the town on the medieval road that connects Jaén with Alcalá la Real, and it connects the town with the Chircales Sanctuary. Constructed in blocks of volcanic rock from local quarries, its single arch spans the Ranera, a tributary of the River Víboras. The first documentary reference to the Bridge appears in the Chapter Accounts of 1580, after its repair for storm damage. In 1751 it was repaired again, since when it has remained intact.

== See also ==
- List of municipalities in Jaén
