= Jurgen Van den Broeck =

Belgian cyclist

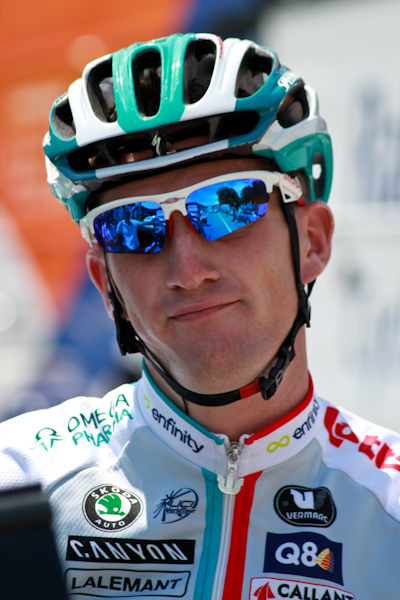
- Van den Broeck at the 2011 Critérium du Dauphiné.

Personal information
- Full name: Jurgen Van den Broeck
- Nicknames: VDBke, JVDB, VDB2
- Born: 1 February 1983 (age 43) Herentals, Belgium
- Height: 1.83 m (6 ft 0 in)
- Weight: 68 kg (150 lb; 10.7 st)

Cycling career
- Sport: Cycling
- Current team: Retired
- Discipline: Road
- Role: Rider
- Rider type: All-rounder

Amateur teams
- 1997–2000: KVC Heist Sportief
- 2001: Kortrijk Groeninge Spurters
- 2003: Quick-Step–Davitamon–Latexco

Professional teams
- 2004–2006: U.S. Postal Service
- 2007–2015: Predictor–Lotto
- 2016: Team Katusha
- 2017: LottoNL–Jumbo

Major wins
- One-day races and Classics National Time Trial Championships (2015)
Medal record
Representing Belgium
Men's road bicycle racing
World Championships
Gold medal – first place	2001 Lisbon	Men's junior time trial

Jurgen Van den Broeck (born 1 February 1983) is a Belgian former road bicycle racer, who competed professionally between 2004 and 2017 for the Discovery Channel, Lotto–Soudal, Team Katusha and LottoNL–Jumbo squads. Van den Broeck specialised in the time trial discipline, having been Junior World Champion against the clock in 2001. The promise he first displayed in minor stage races like the Tour de Romandie and Eneco Tour was later validated and confirmed by top-10 finishes in all three Grand Tours: the Giro d'Italia, the Tour de France and the Vuelta a España.

== Cycling career ==
=== Early career ===
Born in Herentals, Van den Broeck won the Junior World Time Trial Championship in 2001 and made his professional debut in 2003 as a stagiaire for the Quick-Step–Davitamon–Latexco team.

=== U.S. Postal Service/Discovery Channel (2004–2006) ===
Rather than remaining in Belgium, however, Van den Broeck signed with the American U.S. Postal Service team of Lance Armstrong for his first full season as a professional in 2004. His only result of note that year was 6th-place overall in the Tour of Belgium.

Van den Broeck remained with Johan Bruyneel's team in 2005 when Discovery Channel took over the title sponsorship, and he continued with the Americans in 2006 after Armstrong retired. During that period he finished on the podium in stages of the Deutschland Tour and the Tour of Belgium (where he also won the mountains classification), and he rode to a top-20 finish overall in the Tour de Romandie. In June, however, Van den Broeck announced his intention to return to Belgium when he agreed to a two-year contract with the then-Davitamon squad, which would be re-branded in 2007 as Predictor–Lotto. The following month Van den Broeck scored his first win as a professional, taking the Schriek, Derny in Belgium ahead of Erwin Vervecken and future cyclo-cross world champion Niels Albert.

=== Predictor–Lotto (2007–2015) ===
==== 2007–2008 ====
At the age of 24, Van den Broeck managed to finish in the top-10 on the general classification at the 2007 Eneco Tour with his new team, though he also won the bronze medal in the Belgian National Time Trial Championships. After completing his first Grand Tour in an anonymous 74th place at the 2007 Giro d'Italia, Van den Broeck finally showed that he had talent as a stage racer when he returned to Italy the following year and came seventh overall in the 2008 Giro d'Italia. Merely months later, both Riccardo Riccò and Emanuele Sella – respectively finishing 2nd and 6th in the 2008 Giro d'Italia – were sanctioned for doping.

==== 2009 ====
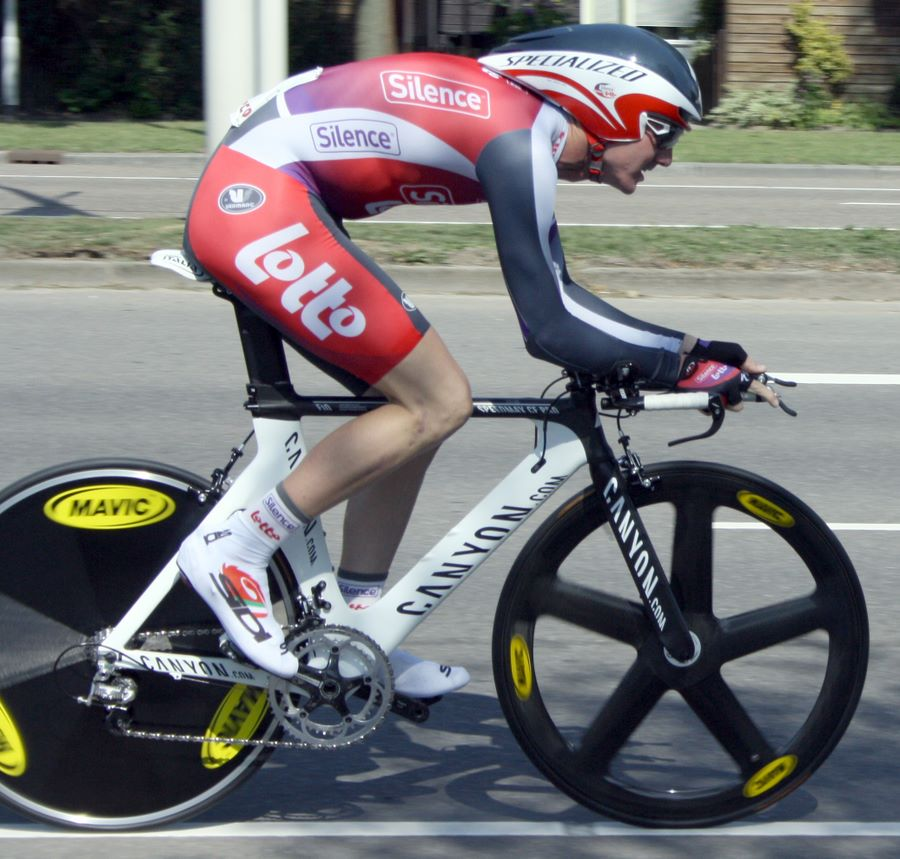
Van den Broeck at the 2009 Eneco Tour

Showing excellent form in the 2009 Tour de France, Van den Broeck climbed with the leaders through the Alps, although he had crashed heavily on the fourth stage team time trial, and lost more than seven minutes. His consistency resulted in 15th place in the final general classification ranking, which was later improved to 14th after the disqualification of 11th placed Mikel Astarloza for testing positive for EPO; he also placed 9th place in the competition for the polka dot jersey. As the performances came at the end of Cadel Evans' tenure at Silence–Lotto, the Belgian outfit decided that Van den Broeck was capable and reliable enough to become their general classification leader.

==== 2010–2011 ====
The following season he rode to an important and somewhat surprising 3rd place (5th place prior to Alberto Contador and Denis Menchov being disqualified and removed from the results) in the 2010 Tour de France, becoming the first Belgian to finish in the top 5 since Claude Criquielion in 1986. After the Tour Van den Broeck won two criteriums: one in Peer and the other in his hometown of Herentals.

In the 2011 Tour de France, after an encouraging first week and while aiming for a general classification podium spot, Van den Broeck had to abandon the race along with another overall contender, Alexander Vinokourov, after a massive and spectacularly grim downhill crash which left him with a pneumothorax, broken ribs and a fractured shoulder. Not to be deterred, however, Van den Broeck recovered from his injuries in time to compete in the 2011 Vuelta a España, where he finished 8th overall.

==== 2012–2015 ====
In 2012, Van den Broeck finished 3rd in the Volta a Catalunya and then finished 5th in the Criterium du Dauphiné, showing good form for the forthcoming Tour de France. On Stage 7 of the Tour de France, a mountain top finish at La Planche des Belles Filles, Van den Broeck lost 1 minute 54 seconds to stage winner Chris Froome after getting a flat tyre just before the final climb. However Van den Broeck then showed his good form in the mountains to move him up to finishing 4th overall.

In 2013, Van den Broeck abandoned in the Tour de France after he crashed in stage 5.

In 2015, he finished twelfth at the Giro d'Italia. In June, he won the National Time Trial Championships for the first time in his career.

=== Team Katusha (2016) ===
In September 2015, Team Katusha announced that Van Den Broeck would join them for 2016, after nine seasons with Lotto.

=== LottoNL–Jumbo (2017) ===
After one season with Team Katusha, LottoNL–Jumbo signed Van den Broeck on a two-year contract. In May, it was announced that Van den Broeck would retire at the end of the 2017 season.

== Major results ==
2000
3rd Time trial, National Junior Road Championships
2001
1st Time trial, UCI Junior Road World Championships
2002
1st Overall Tour of Limburg
8th Overall Le Triptyque des Monts et Châteaux
2003
1st Zellik–Galmaarden
1st Clásica Memorial Txuma
2nd Overall Le Triptyque des Monts et Châteaux

1st Stage 2b

2nd Time trial, National Under-23 Road Championships
2nd Liège–Bastogne–Liège Espoirs
2nd GP Istria 1
2nd GP Krka
3rd Kattekoers
4th Road race, UEC European Under-23 Road Championships
2004
5th Overall Redlands Bicycle Classic
6th Overall Tour of Belgium
2005
8th Overall Eneco Tour
2006
1st Mountains classification, Tour of Belgium
8th Kuurne–Brussels–Kuurne
2007
3rd Time trial, National Road Championships
6th Overall Danmark Rundt
10th Overall Eneco Tour
2008
7th Overall Giro d'Italia
2009
1st Natourcriterium Herentals
4th Overall Eneco Tour
2010
2nd Overall Vuelta a Andalucía
3rd Overall Tour de France
4th Overall Critérium du Dauphiné
10th Overall Tour of the Basque Country
2011
2nd Overall Vuelta a Andalucía
4th Overall Critérium du Dauphiné

1st Stage 1

7th Overall Vuelta a España
2012
3rd Overall Volta a Catalunya
4th Overall Volta ao Algarve
4th Overall Tour de France
5th Overall Critérium du Dauphiné
10th La Flèche Wallonne
2013
2nd Overall Vuelta a Andalucía
5th Overall Tour de San Luis
7th Overall Tour de Romandie
9th Overall Volta a Catalunya
2014
3rd Overall Critérium du Dauphiné
2015
1st Time trial, National Road Championships
2016
8th Overall Tour of California

=== General classification results timeline ===
Grand Tour general classification results
Grand Tour	2004	2005	2006	2007	2008	2009	2010	2011	2012	2013	2014	2015	2016	2017
Giro d'Italia	—	—	—	74	7	—	—	—	—	—	—	12	—	91
Tour de France	—	—	—	—	—	15	3	DNF	4	DNF	13	—	DNF	—
/ Vuelta a España	—	—	—	—	—	—	—	7	DNF	—	DNF	DNF	—	—
Major stage race general classification results
Race	2004	2005	2006	2007	2008	2009	2010	2011	2012	2013	2014	2015	2016	2017
Paris–Nice	—	—	—	25	35	15	DNF	DNF	—	—	—	—	—	—
/ Tirreno–Adriatico	—	—	—	—	—	—	—	—	—	—	DNF	11	—	DNF
Volta a Catalunya	68	71	—	—	—	—	—	—	3	9	35	23	—	—
Tour of the Basque Country	DNF	—	DNF	DNF	23	—	10	13	12	—	27	—	29	—
Tour de Romandie	—	56	20	44	—	68	—	—	—	7	—	14	—	57
Critérium du Dauphiné	—	—	—	—	—	29	4	4	5	29	3	—	24	—
Tour de Suisse	—	45	—	DNF	—	—	—	—	—	—	—	DNF	—	—

Legend
—	Did not compete
DNF	Did not finish
