= Maxime Monfort =

Belgian road bicycle racer

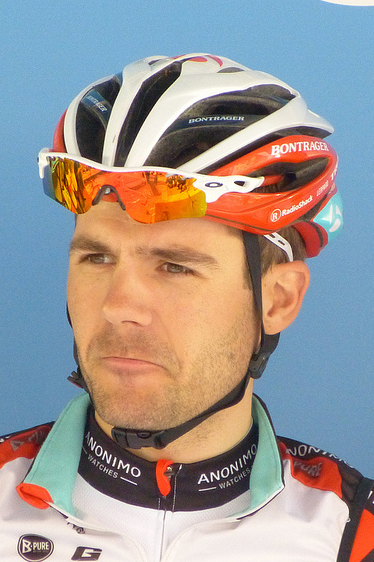
- Monfort in 2013.

Personal information
- Full name: Maxime Monfort
- Born: 14 January 1983 (age 43) Bastogne, Wallonia, Belgium
- Height: 1.81 m (5 ft 11 in)
- Weight: 66 kg (146 lb; 10.4 st)

Cycling career
- Sport: Cycling
- Current team: Retired
- Discipline: Road
- Role: Rider
- Rider type: All-rounder

Professional teams
- 2004–2005: Landbouwkrediet–Colnago
- 2006–2008: Cofidis
- 2009–2010: Team Columbia–High Road
- 2011–2013: Leopard Trek
- 2014–2019: Lotto–Belisol

Major wins
- Grand Tours Vuelta a España 1 TTT stage (2011) Stage races Tour de Luxembourg (2004) Bayern Rundfahrt (2010) One-day races and Classics National Time Trial Championships (2009)

Maxime Monfort (born 14 January 1983) is a Belgian former professional road racing cyclist, who competed professionally between 2004 and 2019 for the Landbouwkrediet–Colnago, Cofidis, Team HTC–Columbia, RadioShack–Leopard, and Lotto–Soudal teams.

Monfort won a variety of races including the Tour de Luxembourg in 2004, the Bayern Rundfahrt in 2010, and the Belgian National Time Trial Championships in 2009. Monfort has also had top grand tour finishes including a 6th-place finish in the 2011 Vuelta a España, and a 16th-place finish in the 2012 Tour de France. He finished 14th in the 2013 Tour de France, marking his highest finish in the Tour.

== Major results ==
2003
4th Circuit de Wallonie
2004
1st Overall Tour de Luxembourg

1st Young rider classification
1st Stage 3

1st Young rider classification Ronde van Nederland
4th Overall Ster Elektrotoer
6th Overall Tour de la Région Wallonne
6th Flèche Hesbignonne
8th Overall Tour du Limousin
2005
2nd Overall Étoile de Bessèges

1st Young rider classification

3rd Overall Regio-Tour
4th Overall Tour de l'Avenir
5th Overall Tour de Luxembourg
6th Grand Prix Pino Cerami
7th Overall Ster Elektrotoer
8th Overall Tour de la Région Wallonne
2007
7th Overall Deutschland Tour
2008
4th Overall Critérium International
5th Overall Tour of the Basque Country
9th Overall Volta a la Comunitat Valenciana
9th Overall Critérium du Dauphiné Libéré
10th Overall Circuit Franco-Belge
2009
1st Time trial, National Road Championships
2nd Overall Bayern Rundfahrt
4th Overall Critérium International
4th Chrono des Nations
5th Overall Eneco Tour
10th Overall Tour de Suisse
2010
1st Overall Bayern Rundfahrt

1st Stage 4 (ITT)

5th Grand Prix Cycliste de Montréal
6th Overall Vuelta a Andalucía
8th Overall Critérium International
8th Grand Prix Cycliste de Québec
2011
4th Overall Tour de Luxembourg
6th Overall Vuelta a España

1st Stage 1 (TTT)

7th Gran Premio Bruno Beghelli
8th Overall Tour of Oman
10th Overall Paris–Nice
10th Overall Tour de Suisse
2012
6th Overall Critérium International
7th Overall Paris–Nice
8th Overall Tour de Luxembourg
9th Overall Vuelta a Andalucía
2013
4th Overall Tour Méditerranéen
10th Overall Eneco Tour
2015
8th Overall Étoile de Bessèges
2016
8th Overall Étoile de Bessèges
9th Overall Tour de l'Ain
2018
9th Binche–Chimay–Binche

=== Grand Tour general classification results timeline ===
Grand Tour	2006	2007	2008	2009	2010	2011	2012	2013	2014	2015	2016	2017	2018	2019
Giro d'Italia	33	—	—	—	—	—	—	—	14	11	15	13	—	—
Tour de France	—	—	23	28	55	28	16	14	—	—	—	—	—	142
Vuelta a España	—	11	—	—	—	5	16	—	16	27	16	DNF	42	—

Legend
—	Did not compete
DNF	Did not finish
DSQ	Disqualified
