= 2012 Ag2r–La Mondiale season =

2012 Ag2r–La Mondiale season
Manager	Vincent Lavenu
One-day victories	1
Stage race overall victories	–
Stage race stage victories	3
Previous season • Next season

The 2012 season for the Ag2r–La Mondiale cycling team began in January at the Tour Down Under. As a UCI ProTeam, they were automatically invited and obligated to send a squad to every event in the UCI World Tour.

== 2012 roster ==
Ages as of 1 January 2012.

Rider	Date of birth
Romain Bardet (FRA)	9 November 1990 (aged 21)
Manuel Belletti (ITA)	14 October 1985 (aged 26)
Julien Bérard (FRA)	2 July 1987 (aged 24)
Guillaume Bonnafond (FRA)	23 June 1987 (aged 24)
Maxime Bouet (FRA)	3 November 1986 (aged 25)
Jimmy Casper (FRA)	28 May 1978 (aged 33)
Gabriel Chavanne (Note: Chavanne joined the team on 1 August, as a stagiaire, from the Chambéry Cyclisme Formation.) (SUI)	20 January 1992 (aged 19)
Mikaël Cherel (FRA)	17 March 1986 (aged 25)
Hubert Dupont (FRA)	13 November 1980 (aged 31)
Martin Elmiger (SUI)	23 September 1978 (aged 33)
John Gadret (FRA)	22 April 1979 (aged 32)
Ben Gastauer (LUX)	14 November 1987 (aged 24)
Gregor Gazvoda (SLO)	15 October 1981 (aged 30)
Sylvain Georges (FRA)	1 May 1984 (aged 27)
Kristof Goddaert (BEL)	21 November 1986 (aged 25)
Sébastien Hinault (FRA)	11 February 1974 (aged 37)

Rider	Date of birth
Steve Houanard (FRA)	2 April 1986 (aged 25)
Blel Kadri (FRA)	3 September 1986 (aged 25)
Romain Lemarchand (FRA)	26 July 1987 (aged 24)
Sébastien Minard (FRA)	12 June 1982 (aged 29)
Lloyd Mondory (FRA)	26 April 1982 (aged 29)
Matteo Montaguti (ITA)	6 January 1984 (aged 27)
Rinaldo Nocentini (ITA)	25 September 1977 (aged 34)
Jean-Christophe Péraud (FRA)	22 May 1977 (aged 34)
Mathieu Perget (FRA)	18 September 1984 (aged 27)
Jimmy Raibaud (Note: Raibaud joined the team on 1 August, as a stagiaire, from CR4C Roanne Cycling.) (FRA)	13 November 1991 (aged 20)
Anthony Ravard (FRA)	28 September 1983 (aged 28)
Christophe Riblon (FRA)	17 January 1981 (aged 30)
Nicolas Roche (IRE)	3 July 1984 (aged 27)
Boris Shpilevsky (RUS)	20 August 1982 (aged 29)
Mathieu Teychenne (Note: Teychenne joined the team on 1 August, as a stagiaire, from the Chambéry Cyclisme Formation.) (FRA)	18 March 1989 (aged 22)
Amir Zargari (IRN)	31 July 1980 (aged 31)

Riders who joined the team for the 2012 season

Rider	2011 team
Sylvain Georges	neo-pro (BigMat–Auber 93)
Romain Bardet	neo-pro (Chambéry CF)
Jimmy Casper	Saur–Sojasun
Manuel Belletti	Colnago–CSF Inox
Gregor Gazvoda	Perutnina Ptuj
Boris Shpilevsky	Tabriz Petrochemical Cycling Team
Amir Zargari	Azad University

Riders who left the team during or after the 2011 season

Rider	2012 team
David Lelay	Saur–Sojasun
Cyril Dessel	Retired
Dimitri Champion	Bretagne–Schuller
Yuriy Krivtsov	Lampre–ISD
Julien Loubet	GSC Blagnac

== Season victories ==
Date	Race	Competition	Rider	Country	Location
13 March	Tirreno–Adriatico, Teams classification	UCI World Tour	(Note: The riders on the squad were Rinaldo Nocentini, Manuel Belletti, Steve Houanard, Kristof Goddaert, Sébastien Hinault, Christophe Riblon, Lloyd Mondory and Matteo Montaguti)	Italy	
25 March	Critérium International, Mountains classification	UCI Europe Tour	Matteo Montaguti (ITA)	France	
18 May	Circuit de Lorraine, Stage 3	UCI Europe Tour	Sébastien Hinault (FRA)	France	Neufchâteau
18 May	Tour of California, Stage 6	UCI America Tour	Sylvain Georges (FRA)	United States	Big Bear Lake
27 May	Boucles de l'Aulne	UCI Europe Tour	Sébastien Hinault (FRA)	France	Châteaulin
17 June	Tour de Suisse, Mountains classification	UCI World Tour	Matteo Montaguti (ITA)	Switzerland	
17 June	Route du Sud, Stage 4	UCI Europe Tour	Manuel Belletti (ITA)	France	Saint-Gaudens
17 June	Route du Sud, Mountains classification	UCI Europe Tour	Blel Kadri (FRA)	France	
17 June	Route du Sud, Points classification	UCI Europe Tour	Manuel Belletti (ITA)	France	
17 June	Route du Sud, Teams classification	UCI Europe Tour	(Note: The riders on the squad were Manuel Belletti, Jimmy Casper, Hubert Dupont, Gregor Gazvoda, Kristof Goddaert, Blel Kadri, Romain Lemarchand and Mathieu Perget)	France	
