= 2011 Ag2r–La Mondiale season =

Cycling team season

2011 Ag2r–La Mondiale season
Manager	Vincent Lavenu
One-day victories	1
Stage race overall victories	1
Stage race stage victories	4
Previous season • Next season

The 2011 season for the Ag2r–La Mondiale cycling team began in January at the Tour de San Luis and ended in October at the Chrono des Nations. As a UCI ProTeam, they were automatically invited and obligated to send a squad to every event in the UCI World Tour.

Ag2r had a meager 2011 season, managing only six victories. The pinnacle of the team's season was certainly the Giro d'Italia. John Gadret, one of the team's leaders, won the undulating 11th stage to Castelfidardo. Though he was outclassed by the race's truly elite riders, particularly so by Giro champion Alberto Contador, he finished the race in fourth place overall, easily the best final placing in a Grand Tour in the team's history. Hubert Dupont also rode very strongly in this race, to 12th place overall and some high stage placings as well.

While the team got several top tens in single-day races from Anthony Ravard, the only such race they (and he) actually won was the lightly heralded Châteauroux Classic. They finished second-to-last in the UCI World Tour rankings, better only than Vacansoleil–DCM.

== 2011 roster ==
Ages as of January 1, 2011.

Rider	Date of birth
Julien Bérard (FRA)	July 2, 1987 (aged 23)
Guillaume Bonnafond (FRA)	June 23, 1987 (aged 23)
Maxime Bouet (FRA)	November 3, 1986 (aged 24)
Dimitri Champion (FRA)	September 6, 1983 (aged 27)
Mikaël Cherel (FRA)	March 17, 1986 (aged 24)
Cyril Dessel (FRA)	November 29, 1974 (aged 36)
Axel Domont (Note: Rider joined the team on August 1 as a stagiaire.) (FRA)	August 7, 1990 (aged 20)
Hubert Dupont (FRA)	November 13, 1980 (aged 30)
Martin Elmiger (SUI)	September 23, 1978 (aged 32)
John Gadret (FRA)	April 22, 1979 (aged 31)
Ben Gastauer (LUX)	November 14, 1987 (aged 23)
Kristof Goddaert (BEL)	November 14, 1987 (aged 23)
Sébastien Hinault (FRA)	February 11, 1974 (aged 36)
Steve Houanard (FRA)	April 2, 1986 (aged 24)
Blel Kadri (FRA)	September 3, 1986 (aged 24)

Rider	Date of birth
Yuriy Krivtsov (FRA)	February 7, 1979 (aged 31)
David Lelay (FRA)	November 30, 1979 (aged 31)
Romain Lemarchand (FRA)	July 26, 1987 (aged 23)
Julien Loubet (FRA)	January 15, 1985 (aged 25)
Yannick Martinez (FRA)	May 4, 1988 (aged 22)
Sébastien Minard (FRA)	June 12, 1982 (aged 28)
Lloyd Mondory (FRA)	April 26, 1982 (aged 28)
Matteo Montaguti (ITA)	January 6, 1984 (aged 26)
Rinaldo Nocentini (ITA)	September 25, 1977 (aged 33)
Jean-Christophe Péraud (FRA)	May 22, 1977 (aged 33)
Mathieu Perget (FRA)	September 18, 1984 (aged 26)
Anthony Ravard (FRA)	September 28, 1983 (aged 27)
Christophe Riblon (FRA)	January 17, 1981 (aged 29)
Nicolas Roche (IRE)	July 3, 1984 (aged 26)
Mathieu Teychenne-Coutet (FRA)	March 18, 1989 (aged 21)

Riders who joined the team for the 2011 season

Rider	2010 team
Mikaël Cherel	FDJ
Steve Houanard	Skil–Shimano
Romain Lemarchand	BigMat–Auber 93
Sébastien Minard	Cofidis
Matteo Montaguti	De Rosa–Stac Plastic
Jean-Christophe Péraud	Omega Pharma–Lotto
Mathieu Perget	Caisse d'Epargne

Riders who left the team during or after the 2010 season

Rider	2011 team
José Luis Arrieta	Retired
Alexander Efimkin	Team Type 1–Sanofi Aventis
Vladimir Efimkin	Team Type 1–Sanofi Aventis
Rene Mandri	Endura Racing
Nicolas Rousseau	BigMat–Auber 93
Gatis Smukulis	HTC–Highroad
Ludovic Turpin	Saur–Sojasun
Tadej Valjavec	Radenska

== One-day races ==
=== Spring classics ===
The team had very little success in the single-day races in 2011. Near the beginning of the season, Nocentini rode to a podium finish and a seventh place, respectively, at the Gran Premio dell'Insubria-Lugano and the similarly named Gran Premio di Lugano the next day. Ravard also took a seventh place that day, at Kuurne–Brussels–Kuurne. In March, Mondory rode to sixth place at Le Samyn. Later in March, Hinault took eighth at the E3 Prijs Vlaanderen – Harelbeke, a race dominated by Leopard Trek's Fabian Cancellara. The next day, Mondory took the team's best result in a single-day race which counted towards the UCI World Tour rankings by finishing fifth at Gent–Wevelgem.

In April, Nocentini rode to tenth place at the GP Miguel Induráin, and Roche did likewise at Paris–Camembert, as did Goddaert in Tro-Bro Léon. The team was greatly outclassed at the monument classics of the spring season, with their best placings being 41st at Milan–San Remo, 17th at the Tour of Flanders and Paris–Roubaix, and 39th at Liège–Bastogne–Liège.

The team also sent squads to the Grand Prix d'Ouverture La Marseillaise, the Gran Premio della Costa Etruschi, the Trofeo Laigueglia, Omloop Het Nieuwsblad, Les Boucles du Sud Ardèche, Cholet-Pays de Loire, Dwars door Vlaanderen, the Route Adélie de Vitré, the inaugural Flèche d'Emeraude, the Scheldeprijs, the Grand Prix de Denain the Tour du Finistère, the Amstel Gold Race, La Flèche Wallonne, the Eschborn–Frankfurt city loop, the Grand Prix of Aargau Canton, the Grand Prix de Plumelec-Morbihan, and Boucles de l'Aulne, but placed no higher than 12th in any of these races.

=== Fall races ===
Shortly after the Tour de France, Ag2r had one of their better single-day finishes of the season with Chérel taking fifth place at Polynormande. Ravard had a string of top-ten placings in the later season, coming third at Paris–Brussels, eighth at the Grand Prix d'Isbergues, and seventh at Paris–Bourges. Ravard was also the rider responsible for the team's lone single-day victory of the season at the Châteauroux Classic, where he raced as the defending champion and took his third career win in the event. Ravard won a large field sprint, a victory which he felt validated his career. He had been considering retirement due to a medical abnormality, as a muscle in his left leg is twice the size of the same muscle in his right.

The team also had good showings from Nocentini at the Grand Prix Cycliste de Montréal (ninth place), Mondory at the Grand Prix de la Somme (second place), Montaguti at the Gran Premio Industria e Commercio di Prato (third place), Bouet at the Tour de Vendée (third place), and Roche at the Giro del Piemonte (fifth place). Roche also took the team's best placing at the fall monument, the Giro di Lombardia, but was a relatively distant 16th on the day.

The team also sent squads to the Clásica de San Sebastián, Vattenfall Cyclassics, the GP Ouest–France, the Grote Prijs Jef Scherens, the Memorial Rik Van Steenbergen, the Grand Prix Cycliste de Québec, the Grand Prix de Fourmies, the Grand Prix de Wallonie, Binche–Tournai–Binche, Giro dell'Emilia, the GP Bruno Beghelli, Paris–Tours, and the Chrono des Nations, but finished no higher than 14th in any of these races.

== Stage races ==
The team was very successful at the Étoile de Bessèges in February. In stage 2, Mondory and Ravard finished in the first two positions after a full field sprint. Mondory took the stage win, and Ravard assumed the overall race leadership. Since he had also finished second in the first stage, Ravard also took the lead in the points classification. With two further top-ten placings later on, Ravard ended the race by winning both the overall and points titles, though he briefly lost both for a stage. The squad finished on the same time as Vacansoleil–DCM for the teams classification, but the Dutch team won the award. Thanks to a second-place finish on the final and most difficult stage of the Tour Méditerranéen, Péraud finished in that same position overall.

It was not until much later in the season that the team took their other victories. In August, Ravard won a stage at the Tour du Poitou-Charentes, outkicking FDJ's top sprinter Yauheni Hutarovich at the front of a field sprint so fast that the first ten riders to finish opened up a three-second time gap on the rest of the field. In October, at the new Tour of Beijing, Roche took the team's final win of the season. He, along with Philip Deignan and Chris Froome had broken away on the final climb of stage 3, 15 km (9.3 mi) from the finish line, and managed to stay away from the fast-charging peloton by a single second. Roche won the three-up sprint.

The team had a small measure of success winning lesser classifications at stage races, doing so at the Étoile de Bessèges, the Giro del Trentino, the Tour de Suisse, the Route du Sud, Paris–Corrèze, and the Tour du Poitou-Charentes. The team also sent squads to the Tour de San Luis, the Tour Down Under, the Volta ao Algarve, the Three Days of West Flanders, Paris–Nice, Tirreno–Adriatico, the Volta a Catalunya, the Tour of the Basque Country, the Circuit de la Sarthe, the Tour de Romandie, the Circuit de Lorraine, Bayern–Rundfahrt, the Critérium du Dauphiné, the Eneco Tour, the Tour du Limousin, and Circuit Franco-Belge, but did not achieve a stage win, classification win, or podium finish in any of them.

== Grand Tours ==
=== Giro d'Italia ===
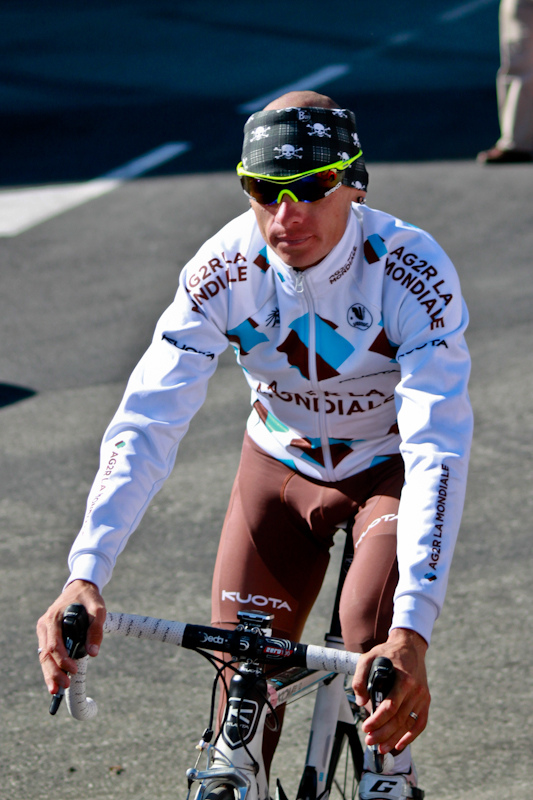
John Gadret won a stage and finished fourth overall in the Giro, easily the best overall Grand Tour finish for both Gadret and the team.

Ag2r's squad for the Giro d'Italia had as its leader Gadret, the 13th-place finisher in the 2010 Giro who aimed to improve upon that placing and ride to a top ten finish. Dessel and Nocentini were named to the squad to aim for stage wins and breakaway representation. The team's showing in the stage 1 team time trial was mediocre at best, as they came home 16th of the 23 teams, 49 seconds off the winning pace set by HTC–Highroad. Montaguti finished near the front of the field in the Giro's first two road races, taking tenth in the mass sprint finish to stage 2, and likewise tenth in stage 3 when the field was a little more split up. Gadret tried to bridge to the leader on the road (Martin Kohler) in stage 5 one of that stage's many dirt road sections, but he experienced mechanical trouble and finished well down on the day, losing almost a minute to the race's top riders. Gadret lay in 26th place after eight stages, which was the eve of the race's first summit finish, at Mount Etna.

Gadret was ninth on Etna, losing over a minute to stage winner, new race leader, and eventual Giro champion Alberto Contador, but only 17 seconds to the race's other top riders, and he put in time to the vast majority of the field. The ride moved him up 11 places in the overall standings. Gadret showed his best form, and cunning, in stage 11. With Contador suggesting that he may tactically surrender the jersey on this stage, the expectation was that the victor would come from a member of the morning breakaway. Instead, the Lampre–ISD team mounted a strong chase to bring the breakaway riders back. Their leader Michele Scarponi later admitted that he had hoped to be the day's winner, but Gadret took the diminished peloton by surprise with a well-timed attack on the stage's final kilometer to claim the first Grand Tour stage win of his career.

Gadret and Dupont then showed climbing prowess in the first of three consecutive high mountain stages that preceded the second rest day. While Contador and José Rujano were easily the strongest riders on the day, the Ag2r tandem broke away from the peloton behind and secured third and fourth positions on the day. Gadret was third, which afforded him a time bonus in addition to the actual time taken. This moved him into the top ten for the first time in the race, in eighth. Dupont also entered the top ten after this stage, at tenth place. With sixth place the next day on Monte Zoncolan and attrition to other riders, Gadret moved up further, to fifth place. Dupont finished eighth on this stage to move up to eighth overall. Gadret gained further time against the vast majority of the field in the Giro's queen stage, stage 15, by finishing fifth and moving up to fourth place in the overall standings. Dupont struggled, coming in 22nd on the day, to fall to 15th overall. Gadret finished the race in fourth place, holding it after each of the remaining stages. Dupont took back a little time against some of the other riders in the field in stages 17 and 20, to improve his final position to 12th. Gadret's fourth place was the team's best overall placement in a Grand Tour in their history, bettering the sixth place attained by Cyril Dessel in the 2006 Tour de France.

=== Tour de France ===
Gadret rode both the Giro and the Tour in 2010, an arrangement which resulted in some controversy when he refused to grant Roche, the squad's leader for the race, his wheel after the Irishman had punctured at a particularly inopportune time. This coupled with Gadret's recuperation after the extremely difficult Giro, and his admission that he prefers the Italian Grand Tour in any event, led to speculation as to whether the two would both be named to the squad. He claimed he would ride only to support Roche, if he rode at all. Lavenu stated that Gadret's impressive Giro had grown his standing with the team, and that the feud between him and Roche had been forgotten, so he hoped Gadret would ride the Tour. Confident of his recovery abilities, Gadret did indeed start the Tour.

The team had only modest accomplishments in the Tour. They had another mediocre performance in the team time trial, coming in 13th of 22 teams this time around. Hinault contested four sprint finishes in the first half of the Tour, but did not pose a serious challenge for victory in any of them, with fourth place in stage 3 his best result. Before stage 11, Gadret withdrew from the race due to fatigue stemming from the Giro. He had been in 66th place, 25'09" behind race leader Thomas Voeckler. Roche lay 13th at this point, 3'45" down. He entered the top ten the next day despite losing time, since attrition to other riders moved him up to tenth place. He lost significant time in stage 14 on the Plateau de Beille, however, ceding six minutes to the race's top riders and falling to 18th. However, this stage also revealed Péraud as a rider to watch. He finished with the elite group, which lost time to just three riders, and vaulted from 19th in the overall classification up to 12th.

Péraud's position held steady for the next three days, in stages won by sprinters and breakaways. In stage 18, which finished at the Col du Galibier, Péraud finished a modest 16th, but this result moved him into the top ten overall. He dropped back out of the top ten the next day on Alpe d'Huez by finishing 12th and sufficiently behind Pierre Rolland that the younger Frenchman took his place, but regained tenth overall the next day in Grenoble thanks to his super time trial skills. He held tenth the next day to finish as the team's best-placed rider. Roche's final position was 26th.

=== Vuelta a España ===
Again following the pattern of 2010, Roche also rode the Vuelta as Ag2r's squad leader. He hoped to improve upon both his dismal Tour, which he admitted was hampered by a crash sustained shortly beforehand at the Critérium du Dauphiné, and his seventh overall in the 2010 Vuelta. Their performance in the third Grand Tour team time trial of the season was even worse than the first two, as they were a paltry 19th of 22, immediately putting Roche 42 seconds off the pace. Roche led the peloton across the finish line in stage 3, but since it was for fifth place after breakaway riders took all the time bonuses, it had no substantial effect on his overall placing. Roche showed strongly on the Valdepeñas de Jaén climb in stage 5, finishing just 7 seconds behind stage winner Joaquim Rodríguez. However, since this final climb was rather short, time gaps were small throughout the field, and this performance only gained Roche one place in the overall standings, moving him up to 25th. Stage 8 proved largely similar, as Rodríguez again won on a short, steep final climb, and Roche finished in the top ten on the day, 15 seconds back this time. He gained two places with this ride. Mondory contested two of the field sprints in the race's first week, but did not come particularly close to winning either, finishing eighth and then seventh in stages 2 and 7 respectively.

Montaguti found a successful breakaway in stage 11, taking sufficient mountains points to earn the blue polka-dotted jersey for two days. He eventually finished second in the classification. Roche also found a winning break in the second half of the Vuelta, joining 19 others to finish 1'33" ahead of the main field in stage 13. This result moved him up to 14th overall. Mondory and Montaguti took further high stage placings in stages 16 and 18, respectively, though both were with a time gap to the day's winner. Roche slipped slightly in the last few stages of the race to finish 16th, falling well short of his goal to improve upon his placing in the 2010 Vuelta.

== Season victories ==
Date	Race	Competition	Rider	Country	Location
February 3	Étoile de Bessèges, Stage 2	UCI Europe Tour	Lloyd Mondory (FRA)	France	Saint-Ambroix
February 6	Étoile de Bessèges, Overall	UCI Europe Tour	Anthony Ravard (FRA)	France	
February 6	Étoile de Bessèges, Points classification	UCI Europe Tour	Anthony Ravard (FRA)	France	
April 22	Giro del Trentino, Sprints classification	UCI Europe Tour	Matteo Montaguti (ITA)	Italy	
May 18	Giro d'Italia, Stage 11	UCI World Tour	John Gadret (FRA)	Italy	Castelfidardo
June 19	Tour de Suisse, Sprint classification	UCI World Tour	Lloyd Mondory (FRA)	Switzerland	
June 19	Route du Sud, Sprints classification	UCI Europe Tour	Julien Bérard (FRA)	France	
August 4	Paris–Corrèze, Teams classification	UCI Europe Tour	(Note: The riders on the squad were Julien Bérard, Guillaume Bonnafond, Dimitri Champion, Mikaël Cherel, Cyril Dessel, Julien Loubet, David Lelay, and Lloyd Mondory)	France	
August 21	Châteauroux Classic	UCI Europe Tour	Anthony Ravard (FRA)	France	Châteauroux
August 25	Tour du Poitou-Charentes, Stage 3	UCI Europe Tour	Anthony Ravard (FRA)	France	Châtellerault
August 26	Tour du Poitou-Charentes, Teams classification	UCI Europe Tour	(Note: The riders on the squad were Martin Elmiger, Maxime Bouet, John Gadret, Yuriy Krivtsov, Romain Lemarchand, Jean-Christophe Péraud, Anthony Ravard, and Christophe Riblon)	France	
October 7	Tour of Beijing, Stage 3	UCI World Tour	Nicolas Roche (IRL)	China	Yongning
