= 2013 Ag2r–La Mondiale season =

2013 Ag2r–La Mondiale season
Manager	Vincent Lavenu
One-day victories	2
Stage race overall victories	1
Stage race stage victories	5
Previous season • Next season

The 2013 season for the Ag2r–La Mondiale cycling team began in January at the Tour Down Under. As a UCI ProTeam, they were automatically invited and obligated to send a squad to every event in the UCI World Tour.

== 2013 roster ==
As of 1 January 2013.

Rider	Date of birth
Davide Appollonio (ITA)	2 June 1989 (aged 23)
Gediminas Bagdonas (LTU)	26 December 1985 (aged 27)
Romain Bardet (FRA)	9 November 1990 (aged 22)
Manuel Belletti (ITA)	14 October 1985 (aged 27)
Julien Bérard (FRA)	2 July 1987 (aged 25)
Carlos Betancur (COL)	13 October 1989 (aged 23)
Guillaume Bonnafond (FRA)	23 June 1987 (aged 25)
Maxime Bouet (FRA)	3 November 1986 (aged 26)
Frédéric Brun (Note: Brun joined the team on 1 August as a stagiaire, from the Bourg-en-Bresse Ain Cyclisme team.) (FRA)	18 August 1988 (aged 24)
Steve Chainel (FRA)	6 September 1983 (aged 29)
Gabriel Chavanne (Note: Chavanne joined the team on 1 August as a stagiaire, from the Chambéry Cyclisme Formation.) (SUI)	20 January 1992 (aged 20)
Mikaël Cherel (FRA)	17 March 1986 (aged 26)
Axel Domont (FRA)	7 August 1990 (aged 22)
Samuel Dumoulin (FRA)	20 August 1980 (aged 32)
Hubert Dupont (FRA)	13 November 1980 (aged 32)
John Gadret (FRA)	22 April 1979 (aged 33)

Rider	Date of birth
Ben Gastauer (LUX)	14 November 1987 (aged 25)
Sylvain Georges (Note: Georges was sacked by the team on 31 May, following a positive test for heptaminol.) (FRA)	1 May 1984 (aged 28)
Hugo Houle (CAN)	27 September 1990 (aged 22)
Yauheni Hutarovich (BLR)	29 November 1983 (aged 29)
Valentin Iglinsky (KAZ)	12 May 1984 (aged 28)
Blel Kadri (FRA)	3 September 1986 (aged 26)
Julian Kern (GER)	28 December 1989 (aged 23)
Pierre Latour (Note: Latour joined the team on 1 August as a stagiaire, from the Chambéry Cyclisme Formation.) (FRA)	12 October 1993 (aged 19)
Sébastien Minard (FRA)	12 June 1982 (aged 30)
Lloyd Mondory (FRA)	26 April 1982 (aged 30)
Matteo Montaguti (ITA)	6 January 1984 (aged 28)
Rinaldo Nocentini (ITA)	25 September 1977 (aged 35)
Jean-Christophe Péraud (FRA)	22 May 1977 (aged 35)
Domenico Pozzovivo (ITA)	30 November 1982 (aged 30)
Anthony Ravard (FRA)	28 September 1983 (aged 29)
Christophe Riblon (FRA)	17 January 1981 (aged 31)

Riders who joined the team for the 2013 season

Rider	2012 team
Davide Appollonio	Team Sky
Gediminas Bagdonas	An Post–Sean Kelly
Carlos Betancur	Acqua & Sapone
Steve Chainel	FDJ–BigMat
Axel Domont	neo-pro (Ag2r–La Mondiale stagiaire, 2011)
Samuel Dumoulin	Cofidis
Hugo Houle	SpiderTech–C10
Yauheni Hutarovich	FDJ–BigMat
Valentin Iglinsky	Astana
Julian Kern	Leopard Trek Continental
Domenico Pozzovivo	Colnago–CSF Bardiani

Riders who left the team during or after the 2012 season

Rider	2013 team
Jimmy Casper	Retired
Martin Elmiger	IAM Cycling
Gregor Gazvoda	Champion System
Kristof Goddaert	IAM Cycling
Sébastien Hinault	IAM Cycling
Steve Houanard	Sacked following doping suspension
Romain Lemarchand	Cofidis
Mathieu Perget	US Montauban Cyclisme 82
Nicolas Roche	Saxo–Tinkoff
Boris Shpilevsky	Lokosphinx
Amir Zargari	Tabriz Petrochemical Team

== Season victories ==
Date	Race	Competition	Rider	Country	Location
3 February	Étoile de Bessèges, Stage 5	UCI Europe Tour	Samuel Dumoulin (FRA)	France	Alès
9 February	Tour Méditerranéen, Stage 4	UCI Europe Tour	Jean-Christophe Péraud (FRA)	France	Mont Faron
3 March	Roma Maxima	UCI Europe Tour	Blel Kadri (FRA)	Italy	Rome
24 March	Critérium International, Teams classification	UCI Europe Tour	(Note: The riders on the squad were Jean-Christophe Péraud, Ben Gastauer, Romain Bardet, Maxime Bouet, Axel Domont, John Gadret, Julian Kern and Christophe Riblon)	France	
16 April	Giro del Trentino, Stage 1a	UCI Europe Tour	Maxime Bouet (FRA)	Austria	Lienz
25 May	Grand Prix de Plumelec-Morbihan	UCI Europe Tour	Samuel Dumoulin (FRA)	France	Plumelec
26 May	Giro d'Italia, Young rider classification	UCI World Tour	Carlos Betancur (COL)	Italy	
16 June	Route du Sud, Teams classification	UCI Europe Tour	(Note: The riders on the squad were Romain Bardet, Guillaume Bonnafond, Axel Domont, Samuel Dumoulin, Hubert Dupont, John Gadret, Blel Kadri and Rinaldo Nocentini)	France	
18 July	Tour de France, Stage 18	UCI World Tour	Christophe Riblon (FRA)	France	Alpe d'Huez
21 July	Tour de France, Super-combativity award	UCI World Tour	Christophe Riblon (FRA)	France	
28 July	Tour de Pologne, Stage 2	UCI World Tour	Christophe Riblon (FRA)	Italy	Passo Pordoi–Val di Fassa
13 August	Tour de l'Ain, Overall	UCI Europe Tour	Romain Bardet (FRA)	France	
13 August	Tour de l'Ain, Points classification	UCI Europe Tour	Romain Bardet (FRA)	France	
23 August	Tour du Limousin, Mountains classification	UCI Europe Tour	Frédéric Brun (FRA) (Note: Brun won the classification, as a stagiaire.)	France	
6 October	French Road Cycling Cup, Overall classification	UCI Europe Tour	Samuel Dumoulin (FRA)	France	
15 October	Tour of Beijing, Young rider classification	UCI World Tour	Romain Bardet (FRA)	China	
