= 2010 Ag2r–La Mondiale season =

2010 Ag2r–La Mondiale season
Manager	Vincent Lavenu
One-day victories	4
Stage race overall victories	2
Stage race stage victories	11
Previous season • Previous season

The 2010 season for Ag2r–La Mondiale began in January with the Tour Down Under and ended in October at the Chrono des Nations. As a UCI ProTour team, they were automatically invited and obliged to attend every event in the ProTour. The team's manager was former cyclist Vincent Lavenu, who had been its leader since its origination in 1992.

== 2010 roster ==
Ages as of January 1, 2010.

Rider	Date of birth
José Luis Arrieta (ESP)	June 15, 1971 (aged 38)
Julien Bérard (FRA)	July 2, 1987 (aged 22)
Guillaume Bonnafond (FRA)	June 23, 1987 (aged 22)
Maxime Bouet (FRA)	November 3, 1986 (aged 23)
Dimitri Champion (FRA)	September 6, 1983 (aged 26)
Hubert Dupont (FRA)	November 13, 1980 (aged 29)
Alexander Efimkin (RUS)	December 2, 1981 (aged 28)
Vladimir Efimkin (RUS)	December 2, 1981 (aged 28)
Martin Elmiger (SUI)	September 23, 1978 (aged 31)
John Gadret (FRA)	April 22, 1979 (aged 30)
Ben Gastauer (LUX)	November 14, 1987 (aged 22)
Kristof Goddaert (BEL)	November 21, 1986 (aged 23)
Sébastien Hinault (FRA)	February 11, 1974 (aged 35)
Blel Kadri (FRA)	September 3, 1986 (aged 23)

Rider	Date of birth
Yuriy Krivtsov (UKR)	February 7, 1979 (aged 30)
David Lelay (FRA)	November 30, 1979 (aged 30)
Julien Loubet (FRA)	January 11, 1985 (aged 24)
Rene Mandri (EST)	January 20, 1984 (aged 25)
Lloyd Mondory (FRA)	April 26, 1982 (aged 27)
Rinaldo Nocentini (ITA)	September 25, 1977 (aged 32)
Anthony Ravard (FRA)	September 28, 1983 (aged 26)
Christophe Riblon (FRA)	January 17, 1981 (aged 28)
Nicolas Roche (IRE)	March 16, 1983 (aged 26)
Nicolas Rousseau (FRA)	July 3, 1984 (aged 25)
Gatis Smukulis (LAT)	April 15, 1987 (aged 22)
Ludovic Turpin (FRA)	March 22, 1975 (aged 34)
Tadej Valjavec (SLO)	March 14, 1977 (aged 32)

Riders who joined the team for the 2010 season

Rider	2009 team
Julien Bérard	neo-pro
Maxime Bouet	Agritubel
Dimitri Champion	Bretagne–Schuller
Ben Gastauer	neo-pro
Kristof Goddaert	Topsport Vlaanderen–Mercator
David Lelay	Agritubel
Anthony Ravard	Agritubel

Riders who left the team during or after the 2009 season

Rider	2010 team
Aurélien Clerc	Retired
Renaud Dion	Roubaix Lille Métropole
Stéphane Goubert	Retired
Tanel Kangert	No professional contract
Cédric Pineau	Roubaix Lille Métropole
Alexandre Pliușchin	Team Katusha
Stéphane Poulhiès	Saur-Sojasun
Jean-Charles Senac	No professional contract
Blaise Sonnery	No professional contract

== One-day races ==
=== Spring classics ===
The team has been moderately successful with several different riders in single day racing. At the Trofeo Laigueglia in February, Dessel was the team's top finisher, coming in eighth in a mass sprint finish. Later that month, Roche finished on the podium at the Gran Premio dell'Insubria-Lugano, coming in third in an 11-man finish. Riblon won Les Boucles du Sud Ardèche at the end of February. This was the first year that race had been held as a fully professional event. On the same day, Bouet was fourth at the Gran Premio di Lugano, as he was one of relatively few riders who continued on after others left in a protest over the lack of security on the course. Goddaert was fifth overall at Le Samyn in March, and Mondory ninth, staying with a leading group that was depleted by repeated attacks in the race's final kilometers.

At the Route Adélie de Vitré in April, Mondory finished fourth overall, in the first chase group behind solo winner Cyril Gautier. Ravard led home the second group on the road, for ninth place. Later in the month, he attained ninth in a mass sprint finish in the Scheldeprijs and finished on the podium at Tro-Bro Léon with third place in a winning breakaway.

The team has also sent squads to the Grand Prix d'Ouverture La Marseillaise, Omloop Het Nieuwsblad, Kuurne–Brussels–Kuurne, Montepaschi Strade Bianche, Gent–Wevelgem, Milan–San Remo, Cholet-Pays de Loire, Dwars door Vlaanderen, E3 Prijs Vlaanderen – Harelbeke, Paris–Camembert, the Grand Prix de Denain, the Amstel Gold Race, La Flèche Wallonne but their best result from this group of races was 13th, in E3 Prijs Vlaanderen – Harelbeke from Mondory and in the Grand Prix de Denain from Ravard.

== Stage races ==
The team's season began in Africa with La Tropicale Amissa Bongo. The race was dominated by French teams, including Ag2r, which took two stage wins. Later in the month of January, at the UCI ProTour's first event of the season, the Tour Down Under, Ag2r won the teams classification. In February, Nocentini took his first victory and first stint in a leader's jersey since he spent a week atop the 2009 Tour de France when he won the first stage of the Tour du Haut Var. Nocentini had also finished second overall at the Tour Méditerranéen, but his strong early season was derailed when he broke his leg at the Gran Premio dell'Insubria-Lugano. In March, the team won the teams classification at another high-profile event in the UCI World Calendar – Paris–Nice.

The team was very successful at the Circuit de la Sarthe in April. Ravard finished fourth in a mass sprint finish to the first stage and then won the road race portion of the second day's split stage, attaining a lead in the event's points classification that proved unassailable. Krivtsov was the last rider out front from a morning breakaway in stage 3; though he was unable to stay away and win the stage, he took maximum points on each of the day's hill climbs. He maintained the lead in the mountains classification through the conclusion of the race. Ravard capped off a successful event for the team by winning the field sprint finish to stage 4.

The team has also sent squads to the Tour of Qatar, the Tour of Oman, Driedaagse van West-Vlaanderen, Critérium International, Three Days of De Panne, Tirreno–Adriatico, the Volta a Catalunya, and the Tour de Romandie, but did not obtain a stage win, podium finish, or classification win in any of them.

== Grand Tours ==
=== Giro d'Italia ===
Ag2r was one of 22 teams which participated in the Giro d'Italia. They were not competitive in the beginning of the Giro in the Netherlands, as they did not have any riders contesting the sprint finishes to stage 2 or 3 and their highest-placed rider after three stages was Alexander Efimkin in 37th. Their fortunes did not improve upon the Giro's transfer to Italy, as they were last of the 22 teams in the stage 4 team time trial. Efimkin gave the team its first top ten in a stage when he finished near the front of the peloton, for ninth, on stage 6, which was won by a breakaway. However, this stage was also costly for the team, as their squad leader Bonnafond was forced to retire from the Giro after crashing and sustaining a gash near his right eye.

Stage 7 was hilly and raced on unpaved roads, and happened to be run on a day with heavy rain. On this day, Gadret began to reveal himself as one of the more consistent riders in the Giro's tougher stages, navigating the mud and the attacks well to finish seventh 29 seconds behind stage winner Cadel Evans. Gadret led the peloton across the finish line on Monte Terminillo the next day, gaining a second on them in the process. In stage 10, Garmin–Transitions leadout man Julian Dean rode so effectively in the stage's final kilometer that just nine riders, Dean included, were together for the sprint finish. Ag2r had a man in this group, Chavanel, though he finished only sixth. A colossal breakaway group formed in stage 11, and Ag2r had two riders, Dupont and Efimkin, placed in it. The group splintered as the long and rainy stage wore on, but Efimkin finished fifth on the day, just seven seconds behind the stage winner and 13 minutes better than the peloton. The time gain moved him to sixth in the overall standings. Efimkin retained the placing for two days, but was quickly dropped on the climb to Monte Grappa in stage 14 and lost over 13 minutes. The next day, on the Giro's toughest climb, Monte Zoncolan, Gadret finished among the best, tenth on the day and three minutes behind stage winner and eventual Giro champion Ivan Basso. Gadret was third in the climbing time trial to Plan de Corones in stage 16, one of only two riders within a minute of Stefano Garzelli's winning time. Efimkin made another winning breakaway in stage 17, though he was unable to stay with the leaders when the group started to fragment near the end of the stage. He finished the day fifth behind stage winner Damien Monier and eight minutes better than the front riders in the peloton. In stages 19 and 20, Gadret again climbed fairly well, finishing fifth and then seventh in the Giro's last two road race stages. He rode most of the Passo del Mortirolo in stage 19 with Carlos Sastre and was part of the second finishing group on the road that tried unsuccessfully to lead then-race leader David Arroyo to the line fast enough to keep the pink jersey on his shoulders. His seventh place in stage 20 meant he stayed with the Giro's very best for most of the stage, fading only slightly in the final climb to the Passo del Tonale. Though Ag2r did not actually win anything in the Giro, and never held any leader's jersey during the race, they were one of only three teams (the others being Liquigas–Doimo and Rabobank) to finish with three riders in the top 20 of the overall standings. These were Gadret in 13th, Efimkin in 19th, and Dupont in 20th. They finished fourth in the Trofeo Fast Team standings and sixth in the Trofeo Super Team.

=== Tour de France ===
Roche led the squad Ag2r sent to the Tour de France. Lavenu stated that the team did not harbor any expectations for a high overall placing, while recognizing that Roche was their best chance for them. Roche also had a stage win as one of his goals. Having worked most of the season to recover from the fractured tibia he sustained at the Gran Premio dell'Insubria-Lugano, Nocentini also made the squad, along with time trial specialists Elmiger and Champion. The team took a high placing in stage 2, as Bouet was the first rider across the finish line after solo breakaway rider Sylvain Chavanel won the stage, but it was meaningless. This was because it had come after race leader Fabian Cancellara negotiated with race organizers for a neutralization of the stage after many riders had crashed, including his team leader and overall Tour favorite Andy Schleck. Mondory placed fifth in the stage 5 mass sprint, behind Mark Cavendish in his first 2010 Tour stage win. The team took two of the top ten spots in stage 10, as a result of two very different performances. Bouet made the morning breakaway, but was unable to stay with Sérgio Paulinho and Vasil Kiryienka, who contested the stage, finishing three minutes back of them in sixth. In the closing kilometers of the stage, Roche put in an attack from the peloton that gained him a minute and 21 seconds, crossing the line seventh on the day. The attack moved him up four places, from 17th to 13th, in the general classification. Mondory took another low placing in a mass sprint the next day, 8th in stage 11.

The team took their one victory for this Tour in stage 14, when Riblon was the last survivor of the morning breakaway and crossed the finish line around a minute ahead of the race's top overall riders. Riblon rode both the Port de Pailhères and the stage-concluding climb to Ax-3-Domaines alone at the head of the race. Stage 15 was well known for the controversy involving the Tour's top riders Andy Schleck and Alberto Contador, but the Ag2r team was also involved in some minor controversy. Roche, who had been all but named by Lavenu as the team's leader for the race, punctured while climbing the Port de Balès. His nearest teammate, Gadret, not only refused to give him his wheel, but also took pulls at the front of the group so that it rode further and further away from Roche. Gadret's group finished over three minutes ahead of Roche's, and the Irishman fell three places to 17th in the overall standings. Lavenu was furious with Gadret for his actions, which led to speculation over whether the two riders would be included on the same squad for future races. In this same stage, Mondory led the first large group on the road across the finish line, for fourth on the day. The team did not have a high stage placing for the remainder of the Tour. Roche finished the race in 15th place, as the team's best-placed rider. He was pleased to finish 15th, while nonetheless ruing the time lost on the Port de Balès which potentially may not have been lost. The squad finished fourth in the teams classification.

=== Vuelta a España ===
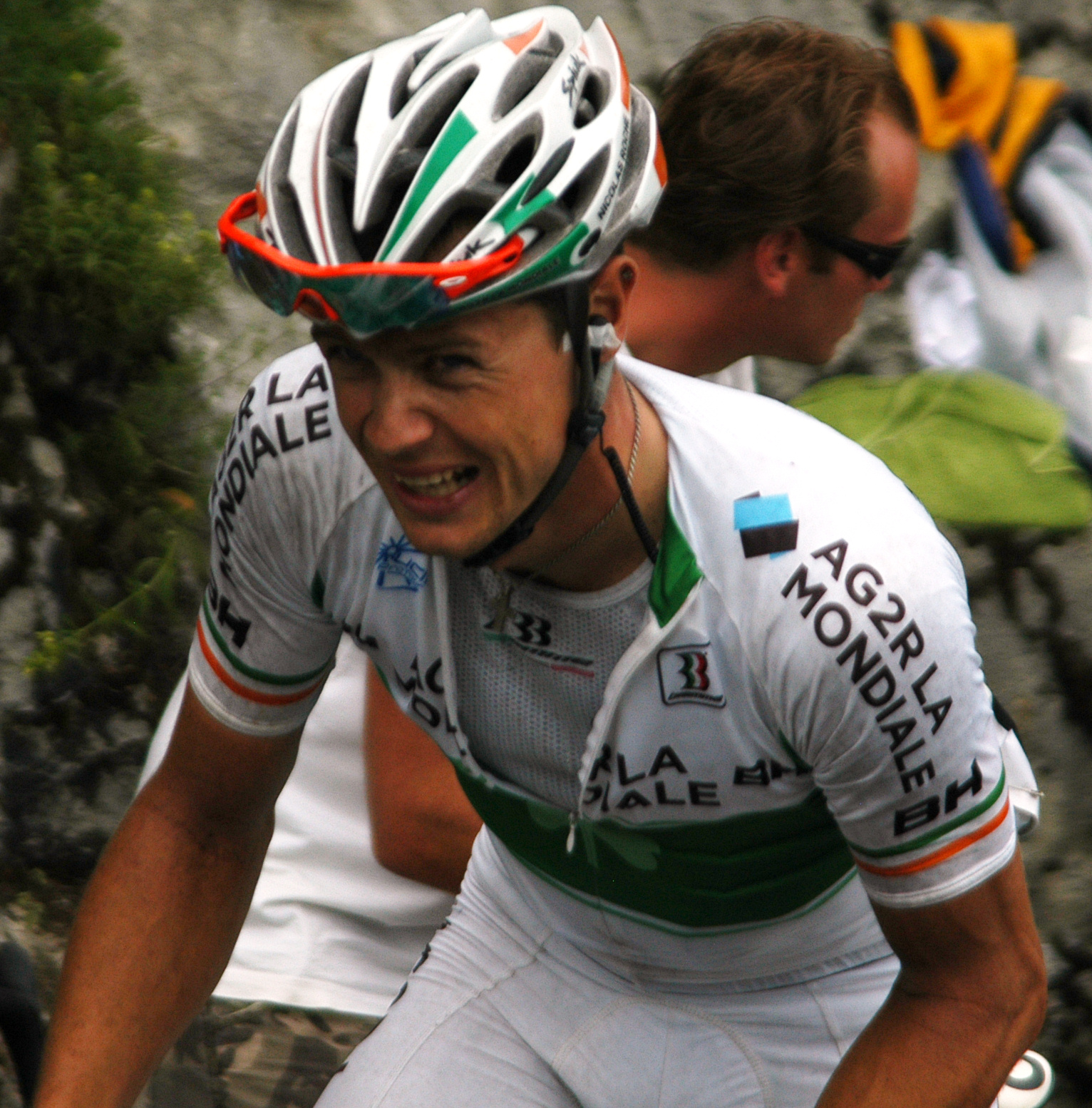
Nicolas Roche finished seventh in the Vuelta, his first career top-ten placing in a Grand Tour.

Roche was the squad's leader for the Vuelta a España. The squad was 17th of the 22 teams in the stage 1 team time trial, finishing with the minimum of five riders together 33 seconds off the winning time put up by Team HTC–Columbia. The third stage, an unusually early mountain stage, provided for some early definition to the race's overall standings. Roche finished sixth in this stage, 15 seconds back of solo stage winner Philippe Gilbert, and moved from 101st up to 25th overall with his time gain against most of the field. In another hilly stage the next day, Roche was eighth in Valdepeñas de Jaén, losing 12 seconds to stage winner Igor Antón but moving up in the standings again to occupy 11th at the day's end. The top of the overall standings remained unchanged until stage 8, the next mountain stage. On the final climb to Xorret de Catí, Roche finished 15th, two minutes back of stage winner David Moncoutié but still moved up into seventh overall with the result, thanks to other riders losing still more time. The next stage was hilly, and Roche lost four seconds to Ezequiel Mosquera on the Alcoy climb, falling to eighth overall before the first rest day while Mosquera moved into seventh.

In stage 11 in Vallnord in Andorra three days later, Roche lost 51 seconds to stage winner Igor Antón and fell to ninth. Roche turned in a very strong ride in stage 14, finishing fifth 34 seconds back of stage winner Joaquim Rodríguez to occupy that same position in the overall standings. Roche lost 32 seconds to the race's top riders the next day on the mammoth Lagos de Covadonga climb, falling back to sixth as Team HTC–Columbia's Peter Velits moved past him in the standings. The two swapped places again after stage 16, when Roche finished better than Velits. Roche had a poor time trial in Peñafiel in stage 17, finishing 38th on the day and dropping to eighth overall. When Garmin–Transitions' Tom Danielson lost time in stage 19, Roche moved back up to seventh. He held this position on the Bola del Mundo in stage 20, finishing sixth on that day. He finished the Vuelta in that position the next day, just over five minutes back of Vuelta champion Vincenzo Nibali. It was the best Grand Tour finish for an Irish cyclist since Sean Kelly won the Vuelta in 1988. The squad finished fifth in the teams classification.

== Season victories ==
Date	Race	Competition	Rider	Country	Location
January 20	La Tropicale Amissa Bongo, Stage 2	UCI Africa Tour	Julien Loubet (FRA)	Gabon	Franceville
January 21	La Tropicale Amissa Bongo, Stage 3	UCI Africa Tour	Nicolas Rousseau (FRA)	Gabon	Moanda
January 24	Tour Down Under, Teams classification	UCI ProTour	(Note: The riders on the squad were Cyril Dessel, Martin Elmiger, Blel Kadri, Yuriy Krivtsov, René Mandri, Anthony Ravard, and Ludovic Turpin)	Australia	
February 14	Tour Méditerranéen, Overall	UCI Europe Tour	Rinaldo Nocentini (ITA) (Note: Nocentini originally finished second, but was upgraded to winner when all of Alejandro Valverde's 2010 results were vacated due to his suspension.)	France	
February 20	Tour du Haut Var, Stage 1	UCI Europe Tour	Rinaldo Nocentini (ITA)	France	Grimaud, Var
February 28	Les Boucles du Sud Ardèche	UCI Europe Tour	Christophe Riblon (FRA)	France	Ardèche
March 14	Paris–Nice, Teams classification	UCI World Ranking	(Note: The riders on the squad were Christophe Riblon, Maxime Bouet, David Lelay, Tadej Valjavec, Dimitri Champion, Nicolas Roche, Cyril Dessel, and Julien Loubet)	France	
April 7	Circuit Cycliste Sarthe, Stage 2A	UCI Europe Tour	Anthony Ravard (FRA)	France	Angers
April 9	Circuit Cycliste Sarthe, Stage 4	UCI Europe Tour	Anthony Ravard (FRA)	France	Sillé-le-Guillaume
April 9	Circuit Cycliste Sarthe, Points classification	UCI Europe Tour	Anthony Ravard (FRA)	France	
April 9	Circuit Cycliste Sarthe, Mountains classification	UCI Europe Tour	Yuriy Krivtsov (UKR)	France	
May 8	Four Days of Dunkirk, Stage 4	UCI Europe Tour	Martin Elmiger (SWI)	France	Cassel
May 9	Four Days of Dunkirk, Overall	UCI Europe Tour	Martin Elmiger (SWI)	France	
June 19	Route du Sud, Stage 2A	UCI Europe Tour	Blel Kadri (FRA)	France	St. Gaudens
July 18	Tour de France, Stage 14	UCI World Ranking	Christophe Riblon (FRA)	France	Ax 3 Domaines
July 26	Tour de Wallonie, Stage 3	UCI Europe Tour	Kristof Goddaert (BEL)	Belgium	Hotton
August 13	Tour de l'Ain, Stage 3	UCI Europe Tour	Maxime Bouet (FRA)	France	Arbent
August 13	Tour de l'Ain, Teams classification	UCI Europe Tour	(Note: The riders on the squad were Maxime Bouet, Cyril Dessel, Hubert Dupont, John Gadret, Julien Loubet, and Ludovic Turpin)	France	
August 25	Tour du Poitou-Charentes, Stage 2	UCI Europe Tour	Anthony Ravard (FRA)	France	Niort
August 29	Châteauroux Classic	UCI Europe Tour	Anthony Ravard (FRA)	France	Châteauroux
September 17	Grand Prix de la Somme	UCI Europe Tour	Martin Elmiger (SWI)	France	Somme
October 7	Paris–Bourges	UCI Europe Tour	Anthony Ravard (FRA)	France	Bourges
