= 2012 Tour de Suisse =

2012 UCI World Tour, race 17 of 28
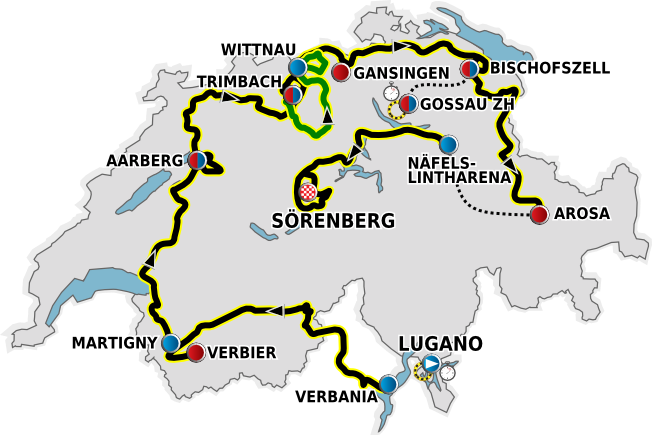
- The route of the 2012 Tour de Suisse

Race details
- Dates: 9–17 June 2012
- Stages: 9
- Distance: 1,398.6 km (869.0 mi)
- Winning time: 35h 54' 49"

Results
Jersey awarded to the overall winner	Winner	Rui Costa (Portugal)	(Movistar Team)
	Second	Fränk Schleck (Luxembourg)	(RadioShack–Nissan)
	Third	Levi Leipheimer (United States)	(Omega Pharma–Quick-Step)
Jersey awarded to the points classification winner	Points	Peter Sagan (Slovakia)	(Liquigas–Cannondale)
Jersey awarded to the mountains classification winner	Mountains	Matteo Montaguti (Italy)	(Ag2r–La Mondiale)
	Team	Astana	

The 2012 Tour de Suisse was the 76th running of the Tour de Suisse cycling stage race. It started on 9 June with an individual time trial in Lugano and ended on 17 June, in Sörenberg after nine stages. It was the 17th race of the 2012 UCI World Tour season.

The race was won by Movistar Team rider Rui Costa, who claimed the leader's yellow jersey after winning the second stage, and maintained the lead of the race until its conclusion holding off attacks from his rivals during the final two stages. Costa's winning margin over runner-up Fränk Schleck of RadioShack–Nissan – the 2010 winner – was fourteen seconds, and Omega Pharma–Quick-Step's Levi Leipheimer, the defending champion, completed the podium, seven seconds down on Schleck and twenty-one behind Costa.

In the race's other classifications, Ag2r–La Mondiale rider Matteo Montaguti won the mountains classification, Liquigas–Cannondale's Peter Sagan comfortably won the white jersey for the points classification, having won four stages during the race including the race-opening time trial stage. Astana finished at the head of the teams classification, winning two of the last three stages through Fredrik Kessiakoff's seventh stage time trial victory and Tanel Kangert winning the final stage.

== Participating teams ==
As the Tour de Suisse was a UCI World Tour event, all eighteen UCI ProTeams were invited automatically and obligated to send a squad. Two other squads – SpiderTech–C10 and Team Type 1–Sanofi – were given wildcard places into the race, and as such, formed the event's 20-team peloton.

The twenty teams that competed in the race were:

- Ag2r–La Mondiale
- Astana
- BMC Racing Team
- Euskaltel–Euskadi
- FDJ–BigMat
- Garmin–Barracuda
- Team Katusha
- Lampre–ISD
- Liquigas–Cannondale
- Lotto–Belisol
- Movistar Team
- Omega Pharma–Quick-Step
- Orica–GreenEDGE
- Rabobank
- RadioShack–Nissan
- Team Saxo Bank
- Team Sky
- SpiderTech–C10
- Team Type 1–Sanofi
- Vacansoleil–DCM

== Stages ==
=== Stage 1 ===
9 June 2012 — Lugano, 7.3 km (4.5 mi), individual time trial (ITT)

For the third successive year, the race began with a short individual time trial in around the city of Lugano. Although starting and finishing at relatively the same height above sea level, the stage had a small hill – the western flank of Monte Brè – around midway through the 7.3 km (4.5 mi) parcours, being used in the race for the second year in succession, after then-world time trial champion Fabian Cancellara won the stage in a time of 9' 41" in 2011. Race organisers expected the best time for the stage to be four seconds slower than Cancellara's time from 2011, predicting a winning time of 9' 45" for the stage. After returning from injury in May's Bayern-Rundfahrt, Cancellara of RadioShack–Nissan was the undoubted favourite for the stage, having won the opening stage of the race on five occasions.

The first rider to depart the start in Lugano was SpiderTech–C10 rider Will Routley, who recorded a time of 11' 33" for the course. His stay at the top of the timesheets was short, as the next two riders – Team Type 1–Sanofi's Daniele Colli and Chris Anker Sørensen for Team Saxo Bank – went substantially quicker than his time. Julien Bérard lowered the benchmark to 10' 29" for Ag2r–La Mondiale, before former Lithuanian national champion Ignatas Konovalovas (Movistar Team) reduced the leading time further to 10' 24" before Team Sky rider Thomas Löfkvist pushed the leading time into the low 10-minute times, setting a time of 10' 05" for the course; his time was the best of the first wave of riders to start. Berard's team-mate Martin Elmiger was the first rider to record a time below ten minutes, beating Löfkvist's time by eleven seconds to set a time of 9' 54".

Elmiger held the top spot for all of fifteen minutes as Liquigas–Cannondale neo-pro Moreno Moser recorded the quickest time at the intermediate point 3 km (1.9 mi) into the stage, and maintained that form to the finish line, setting a time of 9' 50" to surpass the time of Elmiger by four seconds. The times of Moser and Elmiger remained untroubled for the majority of the following riders, and it was not until Cancellara took to the course, around two hours after they had completed their efforts, that their times came under significant pressure. Cancellara was nine seconds slower than Moser at the intermediate time-point, but paced the second half of the course more efficiently and was three seconds quicker at the end of the stage. As Cancellara was finishing, Sagan was starting the course and was six seconds quicker to the same time-point; Cancellara closed out the course quicker, but Sagan held on by four seconds to take the stage victory. Moser and Elmiger maintained third and fourth to the end, with the top five being rounded out by Astana rider Fredrik Kessiakoff.

Stage 1 Result and General Classification after Stage 1

	Rider	Team	Time
1	Peter Sagan (SVK)	Liquigas–Cannondale	9' 43"
2	Fabian Cancellara (SUI)	RadioShack–Nissan	+ 4"
3	Moreno Moser (ITA)	Liquigas–Cannondale	+ 7"
4	Martin Elmiger (SUI)	Ag2r–La Mondiale	+ 11"
5	Fredrik Kessiakoff (SWE)	Astana	+ 15"
6	Michael Albasini (SUI)	Orica–GreenEDGE	+ 17"
7	Dario Cataldo (ITA)	Omega Pharma–Quick-Step	+ 18"
8	Roman Kreuziger (CZE)	Astana	+ 19"
9	Tom-Jelte Slagter (NED)	Rabobank	+ 20"
10	Jakob Fuglsang (DEN)	RadioShack–Nissan	+ 22"

=== Stage 2 ===
10 June 2012 — Verbania (Italy) to Verbier, 218.3 km (135.6 mi)

The race's second stage started across the Swiss border, in the Italian city of Verbania on the shores of Lake Maggiore. The parcours featured two categorised climbs during its 218.3 km (135.6 mi) itinerary; of which both were rated as hors catégorie and both came as the race returned to Swiss soil. The Simplonpass, reaching an altitude of 2,005 m (6,578 ft), was the first of the two on the route after 87.8 km (54.6 mi), with the other coming on the run-in to Verbier; that particular climb to Verbier had an average gradient of 7.5% for its 8.8 km (5.5 mi) duration. Although the points were on offer with under 2 km (1.2 mi) to go, the route climbed slightly further to the finish line. The breakaway of the day was formed by one member of each of the two wildcard teams in the race, Team Type 1–Sanofi and SpiderTech–C10.

The former team's Alessandro Bazzana was the instigator as soon as the race left Verbania, and was later joined by Ryan Anderson as the two riders quickly set up an advantage over the main field. As such, after only 10 km (6.2 mi) of racing, the pairing held an advantage of around ten minutes over the peloton, but this was cut by half as the race entered Switzerland. Anderson took the maximum haul of points at the top of the Simplonpass ahead of Bazzana, while the peloton had closed to four minutes behind at that point, but soon slowed down and the advantage was back out towards eight minutes at the foot of the descent. The peloton then started to close the advantage back down, mainly led by BMC Racing Team and Liquigas–Cannondale, and the leaders were caught prior to the intermediate sprint point in Martigny, where race leader Peter Sagan (Liquigas–Cannondale) was first across the line to extend his points classification lead. Sagan also took maximum points at the following intermediate sprint several kilometres later in Sembrancher, which also gave him six bonus seconds towards the general classification.

Rain was starting to play a part in proceedings, making the final climb slightly more trickier than what was expected. Ag2r–La Mondiale and Garmin–Barracuda moved towards the front to set the tempo on the climb, but Laurens ten Dam of Rabobank was the first rider to make a move on the climb, but RadioShack–Nissan closed down the move immediately with Linus Gerdemann leading the peloton across. Gerdemann's team-mate Fränk Schleck – the winner of the race in 2010 – was next to attack, and gathered more ground than what ten Dam achieved, with no immediate reaction from the main field. Schleck had built up a 30-second lead with 4 km (2.5 mi) remaining, when John Gadret (Ag2r–La Mondiale) attacked. He was brought back, but soon caught up with a secondary move by Garmin–Barracuda's Tom Danielson. Movistar Team rider Rui Costa soon accelerated past both riders and set off after Schleck, who was tiring in the closing stages. Costa caught, passed and gapped Schleck in the closing metres, eventually taking the stage victory by four seconds, with Mikel Nieve third for Euskaltel–Euskadi. Costa, who moved into the race lead with his result, later dedicated his performance to his former team-mate Mauricio Soler, who won the second stage of the 2011 edition of the race, before he suffered serious injuries during a sixth stage crash from which he is still recovering from.

Stage 2 Result

	Rider	Team	Time
1	Rui Costa (POR)	Movistar Team	6h 21' 13"
2	Fränk Schleck (LUX)	RadioShack–Nissan	+ 4"
3	Mikel Nieve (ESP)	Euskaltel–Euskadi	+ 12"
4	Giampaolo Caruso (ITA)	Team Katusha	+ 13"
5	Thibaut Pinot (FRA)	FDJ–BigMat	+ 13"
6	Nicolas Roche (IRL)	Ag2r–La Mondiale	+ 16"
7	Chris Anker Sørensen (DEN)	Team Saxo Bank	+ 16"
8	John Gadret (FRA)	Ag2r–La Mondiale	+ 16"
9	Alejandro Valverde (ESP)	Movistar Team	+ 18"
10	Roman Kreuziger (CZE)	Astana	+ 22"

General Classification after Stage 2

	Rider	Team	Time
1	Rui Costa (POR)	Movistar Team	6h 31' 22"
2	Fränk Schleck (LUX)	RadioShack–Nissan	+ 8"
3	Roman Kreuziger (CZE)	Astana	+ 15"
4	Thibaut Pinot (FRA)	FDJ–BigMat	+ 19"
5	Nicolas Roche (IRL)	Ag2r–La Mondiale	+ 21"
6	Thomas Löfkvist (SWE)	Team Sky	+ 21"
7	Alejandro Valverde (ESP)	Movistar Team	+ 23"
8	John Gadret (FRA)	Ag2r–La Mondiale	+ 24"
9	Mikel Nieve (ESP)	Euskaltel–Euskadi	+ 26"
10	Tom Danielson (USA)	Garmin–Barracuda	+ 29"

=== Stage 3 ===
11 June 2012 — Martigny to Aarberg, 194.7 km (121.0 mi)

The parcours for the stage had several uncategorised hills during its 194.7 km (121.0 mi) itinerary; indeed, for the points and mountains classifications, points were on offer in the final 39.1 km (24.3 mi) circuit around Aarberg. In that final 39.1 km (24.3 mi) circuit, there were two intermediate sprint points in Wiler and Uettligen, as well as the two categorised climbs; a third-category climb at Frienisberg, and a fourth-category pass on the Aarbergstrasse, with the latter coming at around 10 km (6.2 mi) before the finish in Aarberg itself. There was a fast-paced start to the stage with several short and punchy attacks, but were closed down immediately. However, a three-rider move was allowed to be initiated after 3 km (1.9 mi), with Ag2r–La Mondiale's Guillaume Bonnafond, Team Saxo Bank rider Michael Mørkøv and Jonas Vangenechten of Lotto–Belisol all breaking free, with Bonnafond being best-placed at over nine minutes down on race leader Rui Costa of the Movistar Team.

The leaders got clear by over seven minutes in the early running of the stage, which eventually reached a margin of eleven minutes approaching the midpoint of the stage where rain started to fall once again. With Bonnafond being the virtual leader on the road, several of the sprinters' teams looked to close down the advantage that the trio held, with the Movistar Team and Orica–GreenEDGE leading the way on the front of the peloton. In Murten, a railway crossing closed with members of those teams able to get through while the rest of the field had to wait until it was cleared; race commissaires later ruled that the riders – around twenty in total – that got through the crossing without waiting were ordered to drop back to the peloton once again. With 40 km (24.9 mi) to go, the three leaders still held an advantage of around eight minutes. Vangenechten dropped back at Frienisberg, while Mørkøv and Bonnafond managed to resist capture until inside the final kilometre, which ultimately set up the bunch sprint. The sprint itself was won by Liquigas–Cannondale's Peter Sagan for his tenth victory of the season, ahead of Orica–GreenEDGE's Baden Cooke and Team Sky rider Ben Swift. Costa maintained his overall lead, finishing within the peloton three seconds later.

Stage 3 Result

	Rider	Team	Time
1	Peter Sagan (SVK)	Liquigas–Cannondale	4h 35' 32"
2	Baden Cooke (AUS)	Orica–GreenEDGE	s.t.
3	Ben Swift (GBR)	Team Sky	s.t.
4	Jacopo Guarnieri (ITA)	Astana	+ 3"
5	Allan Davis (AUS)	Orica–GreenEDGE	+ 3"
6	Yauheni Hutarovich (BLR)	FDJ–BigMat	+ 3"
7	Lloyd Mondory (FRA)	Ag2r–La Mondiale	+ 3"
8	Tyler Farrar (USA)	Garmin–Barracuda	+ 3"
9	Daniele Colli (ITA)	Team Type 1–Sanofi	+ 3"
10	Marcus Burghardt (GER)	BMC Racing Team	+ 3"

General Classification after Stage 3

	Rider	Team	Time
1	Rui Costa (POR)	Movistar Team	11h 06' 57"
2	Fränk Schleck (LUX)	RadioShack–Nissan	+ 8"
3	Roman Kreuziger (CZE)	Astana	+ 15"
4	Thibaut Pinot (FRA)	FDJ–BigMat	+ 19"
5	Nicolas Roche (IRL)	Ag2r–La Mondiale	+ 21"
6	Thomas Löfkvist (SWE)	Team Sky	+ 21"
7	Alejandro Valverde (ESP)	Movistar Team	+ 23"
8	John Gadret (FRA)	Ag2r–La Mondiale	+ 24"
9	Mikel Nieve (ESP)	Euskaltel–Euskadi	+ 26"
10	Tom Danielson (USA)	Garmin–Barracuda	+ 29"

=== Stage 4 ===
12 June 2012 — Aarberg to Trimbach-Olten, 188.8 km (117.3 mi)

Having started from the previous day's finish in Aarberg, the fourth stage saw the itinerary take in several uncategorised passes in the early kilometres of the 188.8 km (117.3 mi) parcours, before the first-category Scheltenpass at the 81.5 km (50.6 mi) mark. Having descended from the climb, the race went over several small hills before entering a 42.3 km (26.3 mi) finishing circuit around the towns of Trimbach and Olten. During the finishing circuit, there were two more categorised climbs; the third-category Unterer Hauenstein and the second-category Salhöhe, with the latter climb summiting at 17.8 km (11.1 mi) remaining. The riders then descended back into Trimbach, via the second and final intermediate sprint point, for the finish.

Two nine-rider groups tried to get clear in the run up to the Scheltenpass, but only the second wave managed to gain a sufficient advantage after the first wave was closed down by the peloton. Nine different teams were represented in the group, with Omega Pharma–Quick-Step rider Dario Cataldo best-placed of the riders – having started the stage in 21st position – 1' 15" behind the overall leader, Movistar Team's Rui Costa. Having held a lead of three minutes at the top of the climb, the nine riders' advantage was reduced to just over two minutes by the time that the riders had reached the finishing circuit with 42.3 km (26.3 mi) to go. Martin Kohler of BMC Racing Team was the first rider to attack out of the group on the Unter Hauenstein climb; he was closed down on the first instance, but re-established his momentum, taking SpiderTech–C10 rider Brian Vandborg, Team Saxo Bank's Sérgio Paulinho and Javier Mejías of Team Type 1–Sanofi with him.

They were brought back several kilometres later, with the group remaining at nine riders after the addition of two more Swiss riders – Mathias Frank of BMC Racing Team and Orica–GreenEDGE's Michael Albasini – to replace Mathew Hayman (Team Sky) and Rubén Pérez (Euskaltel–Euskadi), after both riders had been dropped. Cataldo attacked inside of 30 km (18.6 mi) to go, while Hayman's team-mate Lars Petter Nordhaug bridged the small gap between the peloton and the leaders, joining Cataldo for a time before soloing away from him. BMC Racing Team's Greg Van Avermaet and Ag2r–La Mondiale rider Martin Elmiger also caught up to Cataldo, and like Nordhaug, dropped him on the Salhöhe; ultimately, the main field caught back to them all, with Liquigas–Cannondale doing the majority of the work on the front. Ultimately, it was the team's sprinter Peter Sagan that took the stage victory, his third in four days and eleventh of the season. Sagan praised the work of his team-mates after the stages, giving special mention to Moreno Moser after he had closed down the attacks in the closing stages. Costa maintained his 8-second overall lead, as all the main contenders finished within the peloton.

Stage 4 Result

	Rider	Team	Time
1	Peter Sagan (SVK)	Liquigas–Cannondale	4h 36' 55"
2	José Joaquín Rojas (ESP)	Movistar Team	s.t.
3	Michael Albasini (SUI)	Orica–GreenEDGE	s.t.
4	Heinrich Haussler (AUS)	Garmin–Barracuda	s.t.
5	Francesco Gavazzi (ITA)	Astana	s.t.
6	Vladimir Gusev (RUS)	Team Katusha	s.t.
7	Matteo Montaguti (ITA)	Ag2r–La Mondiale	s.t.
8	Wout Poels (NED)	Vacansoleil–DCM	s.t.
9	Óscar Freire (ESP)	Team Katusha	s.t.
10	Mathias Frank (SUI)	BMC Racing Team	s.t.

General Classification after Stage 4

	Rider	Team	Time
1	Rui Costa (POR)	Movistar Team	15h 43' 52"
2	Fränk Schleck (LUX)	RadioShack–Nissan	+ 8"
3	Roman Kreuziger (CZE)	Astana	+ 15"
4	Thibaut Pinot (FRA)	FDJ–BigMat	+ 19"
5	Nicolas Roche (IRL)	Ag2r–La Mondiale	+ 21"
6	Thomas Löfkvist (SWE)	Team Sky	+ 21"
7	Alejandro Valverde (ESP)	Movistar Team	+ 23"
8	John Gadret (FRA)	Ag2r–La Mondiale	+ 24"
9	Mikel Nieve (ESP)	Euskaltel–Euskadi	+ 26"
10	Tom Danielson (USA)	Garmin–Barracuda	+ 29"

=== Stage 5 ===
13 June 2012 — Olten-Trimbach to Gansingen, 192.7 km (119.7 mi)

Third-category climbs were prominent in the itinerary for the fifth stage, with six in total during the 192.7 km (119.7 mi) parcours, of which two – the Bürersteig and Kaistenberg passes – were climbed twice. These climbs were carried out in such a manner, as two laps of a 40.9 km (25.4 mi) finishing circuit around Gansingen were completed before the finish. Once again, the stage was run in conditions of heavy rain, but this did not stop some riders trying to break away from the main field within the opening 10 km (6.2 mi) of the stage. Among those were sprinters Tom Boonen (Omega Pharma–Quick-Step) and Liquigas–Cannondale's Elia Viviani but neither rider could establish a sufficient gap from the peloton.

Not long after, Viviani's team-mate Daniel Oss was able to breach the confines of the peloton and was joined by Team Saxo Bank's Karsten Kroon; the pair were later joined by five more riders – Team Katusha's Vladimir Isaichev, Euskaltel–Euskadi rider Rubén Pérez, Salvatore Puccio of Team Sky, Klaas Lodewyck (BMC Racing Team) and Sébastien Minard representing the Ag2r–La Mondiale team – and they quickly established a sizable lead over the peloton, as Puccio was the best-placed rider at over thirteen minutes behind race leader Rui Costa of the Movistar Team. The advantage remained between eight and ten minutes for the majority of the stage, and as the breakaway moved onto their final lap of the circuit, it looked likely that they would stay away and move up the general classification as a result. Lodewyck was the first to launch an attack halfway around the finishing circuit, and was closed down by Isaichev who brought the rest of the group back up to him.

On the second climb of the Kaistenberg, Lodewyck was dropped – due to being physically "broken" – as Pérez pushed the tempo higher, making two attacks off the front but Isaichev closed him down on both occasions. Oss and Kroon both launched solo moves as a disjointed wave of attacks continued in the closing stages, and momentarily split into two small groups before reforming as a group of six with around 5 km (3.1 mi) remaining of the stage. Minard, Pérez and Oss were slightly clear as they passed under the flamme rouge indicating 1 km (0.6 mi) to go, but Isaichev, Kroon and Puccio pulled back up to the other trio and the six battled it out for the stage victory. Isaichev attacked with 250 m (820 ft) to go and held off his rivals to the line, taking the first victory of his professional career – as well as the lead of the mountains competition – ahead of Pérez and Puccio. Viviani led the main field across the line over eleven minutes down in eighth place, with Costa maintaining his 8-second overall lead for another day.

Stage 5 Result

	Rider	Team	Time
1	Vladimir Isaichev (RUS)	Team Katusha	4h 58' 28"
2	Rubén Pérez (ESP)	Euskaltel–Euskadi	s.t.
3	Salvatore Puccio (ITA)	Team Sky	s.t.
4	Karsten Kroon (NED)	Team Saxo Bank	s.t.
5	Sébastien Minard (FRA)	Ag2r–La Mondiale	s.t.
6	Daniel Oss (ITA)	Liquigas–Cannondale	+ 5"
7	Klaas Lodewyck (BEL)	BMC Racing Team	+ 1' 50"
8	Elia Viviani (ITA)	Liquigas–Cannondale	+ 11' 07"
9	Kris Boeckmans (BEL)	Vacansoleil–DCM	+ 11' 07"
10	Alessandro Bazzana (ITA)	Team Type 1–Sanofi	+ 11' 07"

General Classification after Stage 5

	Rider	Team	Time
1	Rui Costa (POR)	Movistar Team	20h 53' 27"
2	Fränk Schleck (LUX)	RadioShack–Nissan	+ 8"
3	Roman Kreuziger (CZE)	Astana	+ 15"
4	Thibaut Pinot (FRA)	FDJ–BigMat	+ 19"
5	Nicolas Roche (IRL)	Ag2r–La Mondiale	+ 21"
6	Thomas Löfkvist (SWE)	Team Sky	+ 21"
7	Alejandro Valverde (ESP)	Movistar Team	+ 23"
8	John Gadret (FRA)	Ag2r–La Mondiale	+ 24"
9	Mikel Nieve (ESP)	Euskaltel–Euskadi	+ 26"
10	Tom Danielson (USA)	Garmin–Barracuda	+ 29"

=== Stage 6 ===
14 June 2012 — Wittnau to Bischofszell, 198.5 km (123.3 mi)

The sixth stage was seen as the final chance for the sprinters to take a stage victory during the race with an individual time trial and two mountainous stages still to be contested over the remaining three days. An undulating parcours of 198.5 km (123.3 mi) was set out for the riders with five categorised passes to be climbed, with the Schocherswil and Ärgete climbs undertaken twice as part of the final 64 km (39.8 mi) of the stage. These climbs were also part of two finishing circuits of a 29.1 km (18.1 mi)-long loop – with each climb categorised on an alternate lap, along with intermediate sprints at Waldkirch and Muolen – while the finish in Bischofszell was uphill and narrow, and pavé featured within the final 200 m (660 ft) of the stage.

A five-rider breakaway was formed around 30 km (18.6 mi) into the stage, consisting of Ag2r–La Mondiale's Matteo Montaguti, Team Saxo Bank rider Troels Vinther, Baden Cooke of Orica–GreenEDGE, Vicente Reynès (Lotto–Belisol) and home rider Rubens Bertogliati representing Team Type 1–Sanofi. With Bertogliati just 1' 45" behind overall leader Rui Costa (Movistar Team) overnight, the peloton were keeping a close margin to the breakaway in the early stages of the breakaway, but Bertogliati later dropped back to the peloton in order for the advantage to be extended. Liquigas–Cannondale, Lampre–ISD and the Movistar Team were mainstays at the front of the peloton as they continue to close down the breakaway; Reynès and Cooke were caught with 6 km (3.7 mi) remaining, with Montaguti and Vinther holding off until 2 km (1.2 mi) remaining. The sprint finish was thus set up, and despite being hemmed in towards the barriers by Orica–GreenEDGE's Michael Albasini, Peter Sagan (Liquigas–Cannondale) out-sprinted Team Sky's Ben Swift and Albasini's team-mate Allan Davis for his fourth win of the race. Costa maintained his overall lead of eight seconds into the individual time trial.

Stage 6 Result

	Rider	Team	Time
1	Peter Sagan (SVK)	Liquigas–Cannondale	4h 30' 08"
2	Ben Swift (GBR)	Team Sky	s.t.
3	Allan Davis (AUS)	Orica–GreenEDGE	s.t.
4	Michael Albasini (SUI)	Orica–GreenEDGE	s.t.
5	Óscar Freire (ESP)	Team Katusha	s.t.
6	Lloyd Mondory (FRA)	Ag2r–La Mondiale	s.t.
7	Marco Marcato (ITA)	Vacansoleil–DCM	s.t.
8	Alessandro Bazzana (ITA)	Team Type 1–Sanofi	s.t.
9	Matti Breschel (DEN)	Rabobank	s.t.
10	Francesco Gavazzi (ITA)	Astana	s.t.

General Classification after Stage 6

	Rider	Team	Time
1	Rui Costa (POR)	Movistar Team	25h 23' 38"
2	Fränk Schleck (LUX)	RadioShack–Nissan	+ 8"
3	Roman Kreuziger (CZE)	Astana	+ 15"
4	Thibaut Pinot (FRA)	FDJ–BigMat	+ 19"
5	Nicolas Roche (IRL)	Ag2r–La Mondiale	+ 21"
6	Thomas Löfkvist (SWE)	Team Sky	+ 21"
7	Alejandro Valverde (ESP)	Movistar Team	+ 23"
8	John Gadret (FRA)	Ag2r–La Mondiale	+ 24"
9	Mikel Nieve (ESP)	Euskaltel–Euskadi	+ 26"
10	Tom Danielson (USA)	Garmin–Barracuda	+ 29"

=== Stage 7 ===
15 June 2012 — Gossau, 34.3 km (21.3 mi), individual time trial (ITT)

Unlike most individual time trials, race organisers created a hilly and technical parcours with several climbs located within its scheduled 34.3 km (21.3 mi) distance. Most prominent was the climb of the Pfannenstiel around a third of the way through the course – the summit marked the first intermediate time point of the course – up to a height of 727 m (2,385 ft), before descending back down, via an undulating section, to the starting town of Gossau; the estimated time to complete the course was just over 45 minutes. As was customary of time trial stages, the riders set off in reverse order from where they were ranked in the general classification at the end of the previous stage. Thus, Fréderique Robert of Lotto–Belisol, who, in 148th place, trailed overall leader Rui Costa (Movistar Team) by fifty-two minutes and forty-five seconds, was the first rider to set off on the stage.

Robert ultimately recorded a time of 51' 31" for the course, but was instantaneously beaten by Euskaltel–Euskadi's Pablo Urtasun; Urtasun finished just one second behind on the road, having made up the gap of one minute between the starting times of the two riders. Having passed Grega Bole of Lampre–ISD before the finish, Nikita Novikov lowered the benchmark to below 50 minutes, as the Vacansoleil–DCM rider recorded a time of 49' 22" for the course. Orica–GreenEDGE rider Stuart O'Grady got closest to Novikov's time, finishing a second off, before it was eventually beaten by Fabian Cancellara, riding for the RadioShack–Nissan team. Cancellara completed the course almost three minutes faster than Novikov, recording a time of 46' 38". Cancellara's time held for around half an hour before Fredrik Kessiakoff (Astana) surprisingly bettered his time by two seconds; Kessiakoff's time was ultimately good enough for the stage victory, his first since the Tour of Austria in July 2011. Costa extended his overall lead to fifty seconds after recording the eighth-fastest time of 47' 17" for the course; Kessiakoff's team-mate Roman Kreuziger moved into second, as Fränk Schleck (RadioShack–Nissan) dropped to fifth overall, while a fifth-place performance for the stage by Rabobank's Robert Gesink moved him into third overall, five seconds behind Kreuziger.

Stage 7 Result

	Rider	Team	Time
1	Fredrik Kessiakoff (SWE)	Astana	46' 36"
2	Fabian Cancellara (SUI)	RadioShack–Nissan	+ 2"
3	Maxime Monfort (BEL)	RadioShack–Nissan	+ 20"
4	Jérémy Roy (FRA)	FDJ–BigMat	+ 25"
5	Robert Gesink (NED)	Rabobank	+ 27"
6	Tanel Kangert (EST)	Astana	+ 34"
7	Andreas Klöden (GER)	RadioShack–Nissan	+ 38"
8	Rui Costa (POR)	Movistar Team	+ 41"
9	Peter Velits (SVK)	Omega Pharma–Quick-Step	+ 43"
10	Brent Bookwalter (USA)	BMC Racing Team	+ 51"

General Classification after Stage 7

	Rider	Team	Time
1	Rui Costa (POR)	Movistar Team	26h 10' 55"
2	Roman Kreuziger (CZE)	Astana	+ 50"
3	Robert Gesink (NED)	Rabobank	+ 55"
4	Alejandro Valverde (ESP)	Movistar Team	+ 1' 04"
5	Fränk Schleck (LUX)	RadioShack–Nissan	+ 1' 04"
6	Tom Danielson (USA)	Garmin–Barracuda	+ 1' 12"
7	Levi Leipheimer (USA)	Omega Pharma–Quick-Step	+ 1' 15"
8	Vladimir Gusev (RUS)	Team Katusha	+ 1' 17"
9	Thomas Löfkvist (SWE)	Team Sky	+ 1' 22"
10	Steven Kruijswijk (NED)	Rabobank	+ 1' 27"

=== Stage 8 ===
16 June 2012 — Bischofszell to Arosa, 148.2 km (92.1 mi)

Following the previous day's individual time trial in Gossau, the race returned to the town of Bischofszell – the finishing town of the race's sixth stage – for the start to the penultimate stage. The stage itself was undulating to start off, with the first third of the 148.2 km (92.1 mi) parcours running between 600 m (2,000 ft) and 1,000 m (3,300 ft) in elevation. Having reached the town of Altstätten, the roads levelled out and the succeeding 70 km (43.5 mi) was relatively flat before the uphill finish to Arosa, incorporating two categorised climbs. After a second-category pass in Castiel, the race climbed yet further with the hors catégorie climb to Arosa – the summit came with 1.5 km (0.9 mi) remaining – reaching an elevation of 1,739 m (5,705 ft).

Four riders – Peter Velits of Omega Pharma–Quick-Step, Orica–GreenEDGE rider Michael Albasini, Garmin–Barracuda's Thomas Dekker and Rémi Cusin (Team Type 1–Sanofi) – went clear around 15 km (9.3 mi) into the stage, making the early breakaway from the field, and the duo managed to extend their advantage over the main field to around seven minutes, at the halfway point of the stage. Behind the lead quartet at this point, Rabobank and RadioShack–Nissan were setting the tempo on the front of the peloton in the hopes of reducing the numbers in the peloton ahead of the run-in to Arosa, while race leader Rui Costa (Movistar Team) punctured but was able to make back to the main field. Albasini and Velits increased their pace at the front of the field, which split the lead quartet apart, as Dekker and Cusin could not sustain the accelerated tempo.

That pairing were eventually swept up by the peloton. Albasini dropped Velits with 18 km (11.2 mi) remaining – prior to the final climb – and soloed away to victory by over a minute from the rest of the field; he had been over three minutes clear with around 10 km (6.2 mi) to go, but the attacking moves in the peloton helped to reduce the time gap there had been. Rabobank and RadioShack–Nissan remained at the front, continually maintaining the pace before the latter team's main general classification rider Fränk Schleck attacked off the front with Euskaltel–Euskadi's Mikel Nieve and Omega Pharma–Quick-Step rider Levi Leipheimer, the race's defending champion. Costa was struggling at the rear, and eventually became dislodged at the back. The attacking trio maintained a gap off the front all the way to the finish in Arosa, finishing 1' 15" behind Albasini, moving Schleck and Leipheimer into the top three and Nieve into fifth overall. Costa finished 50 seconds behind that group, thanks to help from team-mate Alejandro Valverde, holding on to the leader's jersey by 14 seconds ahead of Schleck.

Stage 8 Result

	Rider	Team	Time
1	Michael Albasini (SUI)	Orica–GreenEDGE	3h 45' 39"
2	Mikel Nieve (ESP)	Euskaltel–Euskadi	+ 1' 15"
3	Levi Leipheimer (USA)	Omega Pharma–Quick-Step	+ 1' 15"
4	Fränk Schleck (LUX)	RadioShack–Nissan	+ 1' 15"
5	Robert Gesink (NED)	Rabobank	+ 1' 36"
6	Thibaut Pinot (FRA)	FDJ–BigMat	+ 1' 36"
7	Tom Danielson (USA)	Garmin–Barracuda	+ 1' 36"
8	Steven Kruijswijk (NED)	Rabobank	+ 1' 39"
9	Roman Kreuziger (CZE)	Astana	+ 1' 57"
10	Jakob Fuglsang (DEN)	RadioShack–Nissan	+ 1' 57"

General Classification after Stage 8

	Rider	Team	Time
1	Rui Costa (POR)	Movistar Team	29h 58' 39"
2	Fränk Schleck (LUX)	RadioShack–Nissan	+ 14"
3	Levi Leipheimer (USA)	Omega Pharma–Quick-Step	+ 21"
4	Robert Gesink (NED)	Rabobank	+ 25"
5	Mikel Nieve (ESP)	Euskaltel–Euskadi	+ 40"
6	Roman Kreuziger (CZE)	Astana	+ 42"
7	Tom Danielson (USA)	Garmin–Barracuda	+ 43"
8	Steven Kruijswijk (NED)	Rabobank	+ 1' 01"
9	Alejandro Valverde (ESP)	Movistar Team	+ 1' 04"
10	Thibaut Pinot (FRA)	FDJ–BigMat	+ 1' 13"

=== Stage 9 ===
17 June 2012 — Näfels-Lintharena to Sörenberg, 215.8 km (134.1 mi)

With six riders within a minute of Movistar Team rider Rui Costa – the overall leader – the final, and queen, stage was set up for numerous attacks and the potential for one of the contenders, including RadioShack–Nissan's Fränk Schleck, to try a solo move and possibly claim the race as a whole. Uncategorised passes were key to the first half of the stage prior to four categorised climbs during the second half; this started with the second-category Rengg climb before a finishing circuit around 60 km (37.3 mi) in length. On the finishing circuit were two hors catégorie climbs; the Glaubenbielen 6.5 km (4.0 mi) into the lap, having climbed yet further from the finish line, as well as the Glaubenberg about halfway around the circuit. The summit of the final climb – the Südelhöhe – came with just 3.3 km (2.1 mi) before the finish in Sörenberg.

Mini-attacks set the course of the early running of the stage, with the field remaining as a whole for the first hour of racing after the attacks were closed down within minutes. As it was, it was not until 40 km (24.9 mi) into the stage that the breakaway was formed. A group of five riders – FDJ–BigMat rider Jérémy Roy, Kris Boeckmans (Vacansoleil–DCM), Brent Bookwalter of BMC Racing Team, Astana's Tanel Kangert and Matteo Montaguti, representing the Ag2r–La Mondiale team – were allowed to break free from the confines of the peloton, and soon gained a lead in excess of twelve minutes on the road, in effect putting Kangert into the race lead if they had managed to maintain such an advantage to the end of the stage. This was not to last however, as Schleck's RadioShack–Nissan team were setting the tempo on the front of the peloton via riders Grégory Rast and Linus Gerdemann.

The pace was maintained all the way until after the Glaubenbielen, where Schleck primed himself for an attack, and eventually did so on the Glaubenberg, countering a move by Euskaltel–Euskadi's Mikel Nieve, who had been fifth overnight. Schleck's move forced the other overall contenders to form a chase group in order to bring him back; Nieve and Costa were joined in the group by amongst others, Robert Gesink (Rabobank) and Tom Danielson (Garmin–Barracuda), fifth and seventh overall respectively. Schleck's advantage grew to a maximum of around one minute, but the chase group were able to re-establish contact with Schleck, and thus negating the chance for anyone to get clear. Up front, Kangert, Roy and Montaguti had dropped their two breakaway companions, before Montaguti himself was dropped; he eventually finished 31 seconds down in third. Kangert and Roy were left to contend the sprint, where Roy launched his sprint first but fatigue got the better of him, leaving Kangert to take the victory, a result that he could not believe at the end. Costa finished 1' 48" behind Kangert in a group with Schleck, Gesink, Nieve and Omega Pharma–Quick-Step's Levi Leipheimer, to take his first overall World Tour win, and the biggest win of his career to date.

Stage 9 Result

	Rider	Team	Time
1	Tanel Kangert (EST)	Astana	5h 54' 22"
2	Jérémy Roy (FRA)	FDJ–BigMat	+ 2"
3	Matteo Montaguti (ITA)	Ag2r–La Mondiale	+ 31"
4	Robert Kišerlovski (CRO)	Astana	+ 1' 46"
5	Steven Kruijswijk (NED)	Rabobank	+ 1' 46"
6	Mathias Frank (SUI)	BMC Racing Team	+ 1' 46"
7	Chris Anker Sørensen (DEN)	Team Saxo Bank	+ 1' 46"
8	Fränk Schleck (LUX)	RadioShack–Nissan	+ 1' 48"
9	Robert Gesink (NED)	Rabobank	+ 1' 48"
10	Rui Costa (POR)	Movistar Team	+ 1' 48"

Final General Classification

	Rider	Team	Time
1	Rui Costa (POR)	Movistar Team	35h 54' 49"
2	Fränk Schleck (LUX)	RadioShack–Nissan	+ 14"
3	Levi Leipheimer (USA)	Omega Pharma–Quick-Step	+ 21"
4	Robert Gesink (NED)	Rabobank	+ 25"
5	Mikel Nieve (ESP)	Euskaltel–Euskadi	+ 40"
6	Roman Kreuziger (CZE)	Astana	+ 47"
7	Tom Danielson (USA)	Garmin–Barracuda	+ 48"
8	Steven Kruijswijk (NED)	Rabobank	+ 59"
9	Alejandro Valverde (ESP)	Movistar Team	+ 1' 42"
10	Nicolas Roche (IRL)	Ag2r–La Mondiale	+ 1' 52"

== Classification leadership table ==
In the 2012 Tour de Suisse, four different jerseys were awarded. For the general classification, calculated by adding each cyclist's finishing times on each stage, and allowing time bonuses in intermediate sprints and at the finish in mass-start stages, the leader received a yellow jersey. This classification was considered the most important of the 2012 Tour de Suisse, and the winner of the classification was considered the winner of the race. There was also a mountains classification, the leadership of which was marked by a green jersey. In the mountains classification, points were won by reaching the top of a climb before other cyclists, with more points available for the higher-categorised climbs; there were twenty-four categorised climbs in the race, split into five distinctive categories.

The third jersey represented the points classification, marked by a white-and-red jersey. In the points classification, cyclists got points for finishing highly in a stage. For stages 3 to 6, the win earned 25 points, second place earned 20 points, third 16, fourth 13, fifth 11, and one point fewer per place down to a single point for 15th. For all other stages, the win earned 15 points, second place earned 12 points, third 10, and one point fewer per place down to a single point for 12th. Points could also be earned at intermediate sprints for finishing in the top 3 at intermediate sprint points during each stage on a 6–3–1 scale. The fourth jersey represented the Swiss rider classification, marked by a red jersey. This was calculated in the same manner as the general classification, calculated by adding each Swiss cyclist's finishing times on each stage. There was also a classification for teams, in which the times of the best three cyclists per team on each stage were added together; the leading team at the end of the race was the team with the lowest total time.

Stage	Winner	General Classification	Mountains Classification	Points Classification	Best Swiss Rider Classification	Team Classification
1	Peter Sagan	Peter Sagan	not awarded	Peter Sagan	Fabian Cancellara	Liquigas–Cannondale
2	Rui Costa	Rui Costa	Fränk Schleck	Peter Sagan	Mathias Frank	Astana
3	Peter Sagan	Rui Costa	Fränk Schleck	Peter Sagan	Mathias Frank	RadioShack–Nissan
4	Peter Sagan	Rui Costa	Fränk Schleck	Peter Sagan	Mathias Frank	Astana
5	Vladimir Isaichev	Rui Costa	Vladimir Isaichev	Peter Sagan	Mathias Frank	Euskaltel–Euskadi
6	Peter Sagan	Rui Costa	Vladimir Isaichev	Peter Sagan	Mathias Frank	Euskaltel–Euskadi
7	Fredrik Kessiakoff	Rui Costa	Vladimir Isaichev	Peter Sagan	Mathias Frank	Euskaltel–Euskadi
8	Michael Albasini	Rui Costa	Michael Albasini	Peter Sagan	Mathias Frank	Euskaltel–Euskadi
9	Tanel Kangert	Rui Costa	Matteo Montaguti	Peter Sagan	Mathias Frank	Astana
Final		Rui Costa	Matteo Montaguti	Peter Sagan	Mathias Frank	Astana
