= Lemarchand =

Lemarchand may refer to:

- François Lemarchand, (b. 1960), French cyclist
- Håvard Jørgensen, Norwegian musician
- Lemarchand's box, a fictional lock puzzle or puzzle box
- René Lemarchand, (b. 1932), French political scientist
- Romain Lemarchand, (b. 1987), French cyclist, son of François
