= Rengg =

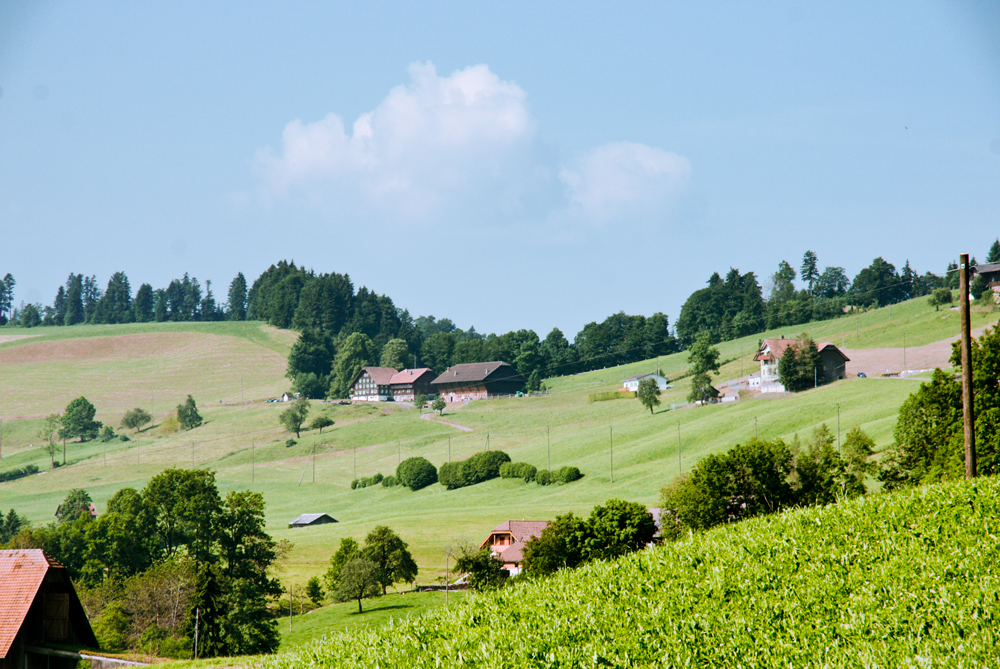
- Rengg pass and Rengg Restaurant
- Interactive map of Rengg
- Elevation: 959 m (3,146 ft)

Location
- Location: Switzerland
- Range: Alps
- Coordinates: 47.0038°N 8.0908°E

Rengg is a locality and a mountain pass in the canton of Lucerne in Switzerland.

It connects Schachen, part of Werthenstein, and Entlebuch. It lies partially in the district of Entlebuch which is a biosphere preserve recognized by UNESCO.

== See also ==
- List of highest paved roads in Europe
- List of mountain passes
