= Dimitri Champion =

French retired cyclist (born 1983)

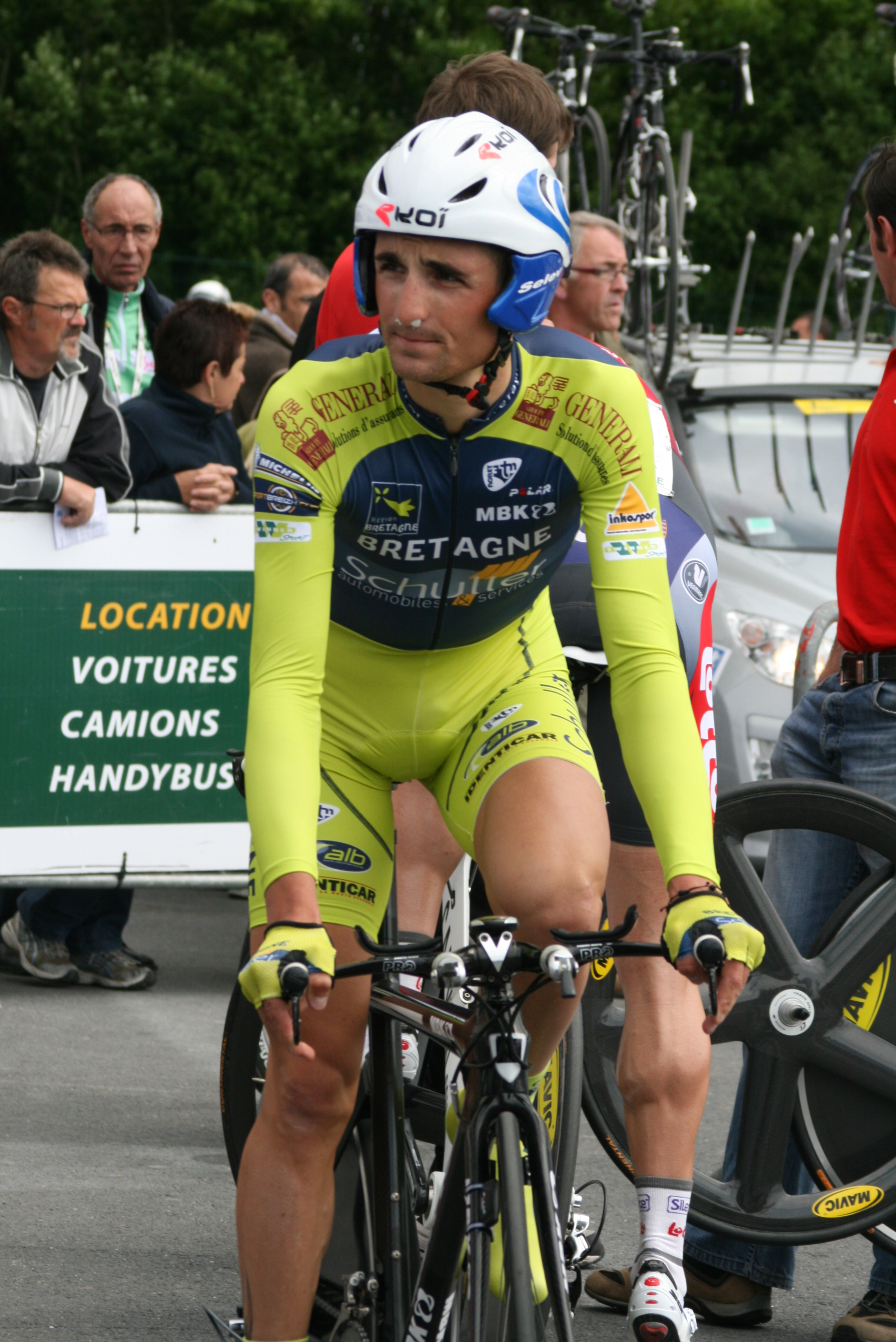

Personal information
- Full name: Dimitri Champion
- Born: 6 September 1983 (age 43) La Rochelle, France
- Height: 1.77 m (5 ft 10 in)
- Weight: 70 kg (154 lb)

Cycling career
- Sport: Cycling
- Discipline: Road
- Role: Rider
- Rider type: Puncheur

Amateur teams
- 2002–2003: Aubervilliers
- 2004: Corbeil–Essonnes
- 2005: CA Mantes-la-Ville 78
- 2006: Vendée U
- 2013: Peltrax–CS Dammarie-lès-Lys

Professional teams
- 2007–2008: Bouygues Télécom
- 2009: Bretagne–Schuller
- 2010–2011: Ag2r–La Mondiale
- 2012: Bretagne–Schuller

Major wins
- French National Road Race Champion (2009)

Dimitri Champion (born 6 September 1983 in La Rochelle) is a French former road bicycle racer, who rode professionally between 2007 and 2012 for the Bouygues Télécom, Ag2r–La Mondiale and Bretagne–Schuller squads. He was best known for winning the French National Road Race Championships in 2009.

== Major results ==
2004
4th Chrono Champenois
6th Paris–Mantes-en-Yvelines
2005
1st Time trial, National Under–23 Road Championships
1st Stage 4 Tour Alsace
5th Chrono Champenois
2006
1st Road race, National Amateur Road Championships
5th Overall Tour de la Guadeloupe

1st Stage 6

2007
2nd Time trial, National Road Championships
2008
4th Road race, National Road Championships
2009
1st Road race, National Road Championships
1st Overall Circuit des Ardennes
1st Tour du Finistère
2nd Overall Boucle De l'Artois
4th Trophée Des Grimpeurs
6th Overall Kreiz Breizh Elites

1st Stage 1

9th Tour du Doubs
2011
4th Duo Normand (with László Bodrogi)
