= Steve Houanard =

French cyclist (born 1986)

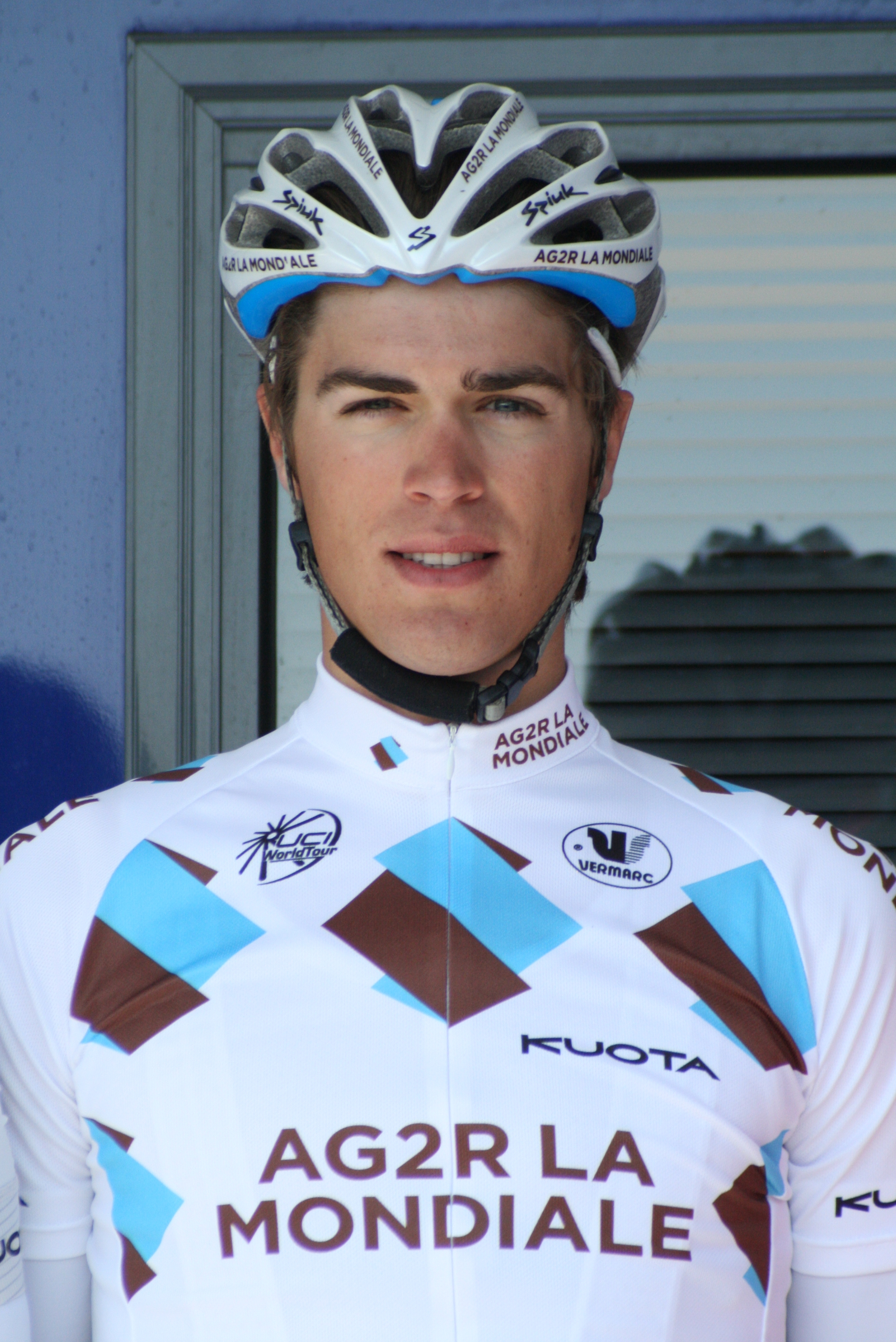
- Houanard at the teams presentation for the 2011 Four Days of Dunkirk

Personal information
- Born: 2 April 1986 (age 40) Paris, France
- Height: 1.83 m (6 ft 0 in)
- Weight: 73 kg (161 lb)

Cycling career
- Sport: Cycling
- Discipline: Road
- Role: Rider

Amateur team
- 2008: Chambéry Cyclisme Formation

Professional teams
- 2009–2010: Skil–Shimano
- 2011–2012: Ag2r–La Mondiale

Steve Houanard (born 2 April 1986) is a professional French road cyclist, who last rode for the Ag2r–La Mondiale team.

== Career ==
In 2011, Houanard participated in his first Grand Tour, the Vuelta a España and finished 133rd. His best result in 2012 was a 22nd placing at the Grand Prix Cycliste de Québec.

== Doping ==
During an off-competition doping test performed on 21 September 2012, Houanard tested positive for EPO and was provisionally suspended by the UCI. His sports director, Vincent Lavenu, was reportedly "saddened and angered" by that finding. Houanard accepted a two-year ban on 18 January 2013.

== Major results ==
2008
3rd Overall Tour Alsace
6th Grand Prix Cristal Energie
2009
10th Overall Driedaagse van West-Vlaanderen
