= Matteo Montaguti =

Italian road and track cyclist

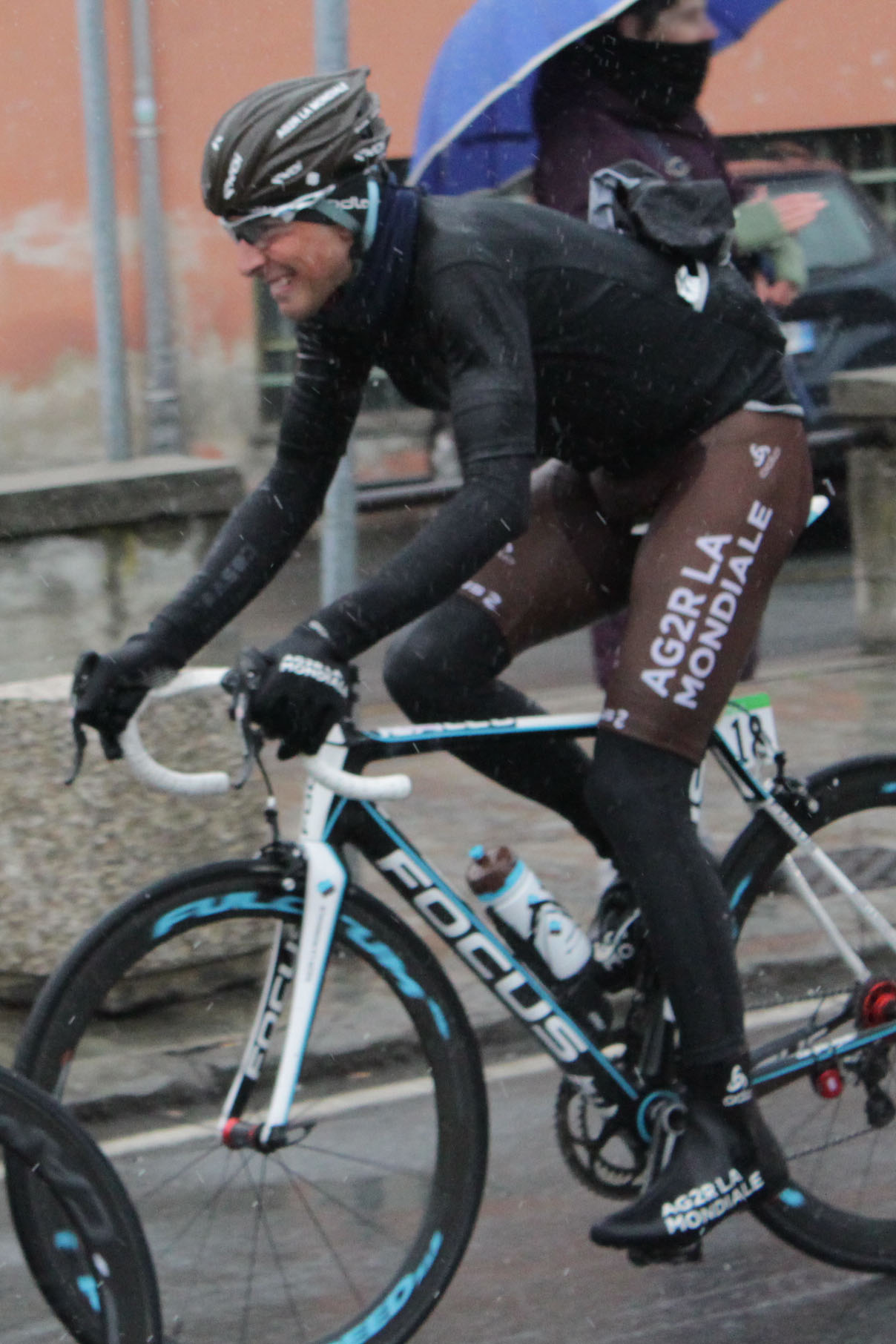
- Montaguti at the 2013 Milan–San Remo

Personal information
- Full name: Matteo Montaguti
- Born: 6 January 1984 (age 42) Forlì, Italy
- Height: 1.81 m (5 ft 11 1/2 in)
- Weight: 66 kg (146 lb)

Cycling career
- Sport: Cycling
- Current team: Retired
- Disciplines: Road; Track
- Role: Rider

Professional teams
- 2008–2009: LPR Brakes–Ballan
- 2010: De Rosa–Stac Plastic
- 2011–2018: Ag2r–La Mondiale
- 2019: Androni Giocattoli–Sidermec

Matteo Montaguti (born 6 January 1984) is an Italian former professional racing cyclist, who rode professionally between 2008 and 2019 for the LPR Brakes–Farnese Vini, De Rosa–Stac Plastic, AG2R La Mondiale and Androni Giocattoli–Sidermec teams.

== Major results ==
2003
3rd Points race, UEC European Under-23 Track Championships
2005
1st Points race, National Track Championships
2006
7th Tour du Jura
9th Gran Premio della Liberazione
2007
1st Team pursuit, National Track Championships
6th Trofeo Franco Balestra
8th Trofeo Città di Brescia
2008
2nd Gran Premio Industria e Commercio Artigianato Carnaghese
2010
1st Overall Giro della Provincia di Reggio Calabria

1st Stage 1

3rd Gran Premio Nobili Rubinetterie
5th Trofeo Laigueglia
6th Memorial Marco Pantani
10th Gran Premio Città di Misano – Adriatico
2011
3rd Gran Premio Industria e Commercio di Prato
2012
1st Mountains classification Critérium International
1st Mountains classification Tour de Suisse
3rd Trofeo Laigueglia
2014
2nd Gran Premio Città di Camaiore
7th Trofeo Laigueglia
2015
3rd Gran Premio di Lugano
4th Trofeo Laigueglia
7th Gran Premio Bruno Beghelli
8th Gran Premio Nobili Rubinetterie
2016
9th Trofeo Laigueglia
2017
1st Stage 4 Tour of the Alps
2019
8th GP Industria & Artigianato di Larciano
10th Overall Settimana Internazionale di Coppi e Bartali

=== Grand Tour general classification results timeline ===
Grand Tour	2009	2010	2011	2012	2013	2014	2015	2016	2017	2018	2019
Giro d'Italia	143	—	77	81	—	44	54	19	51	42	53
Tour de France	—	—	—	—	—	66	—	—	—	—	—
Vuelta a España	—	—	76	72	DNF	—	41	—	—	—	—

Legend
—	Did not compete
DNF	Did not finish
