= Hubert Dupont =

French road bicycle racer

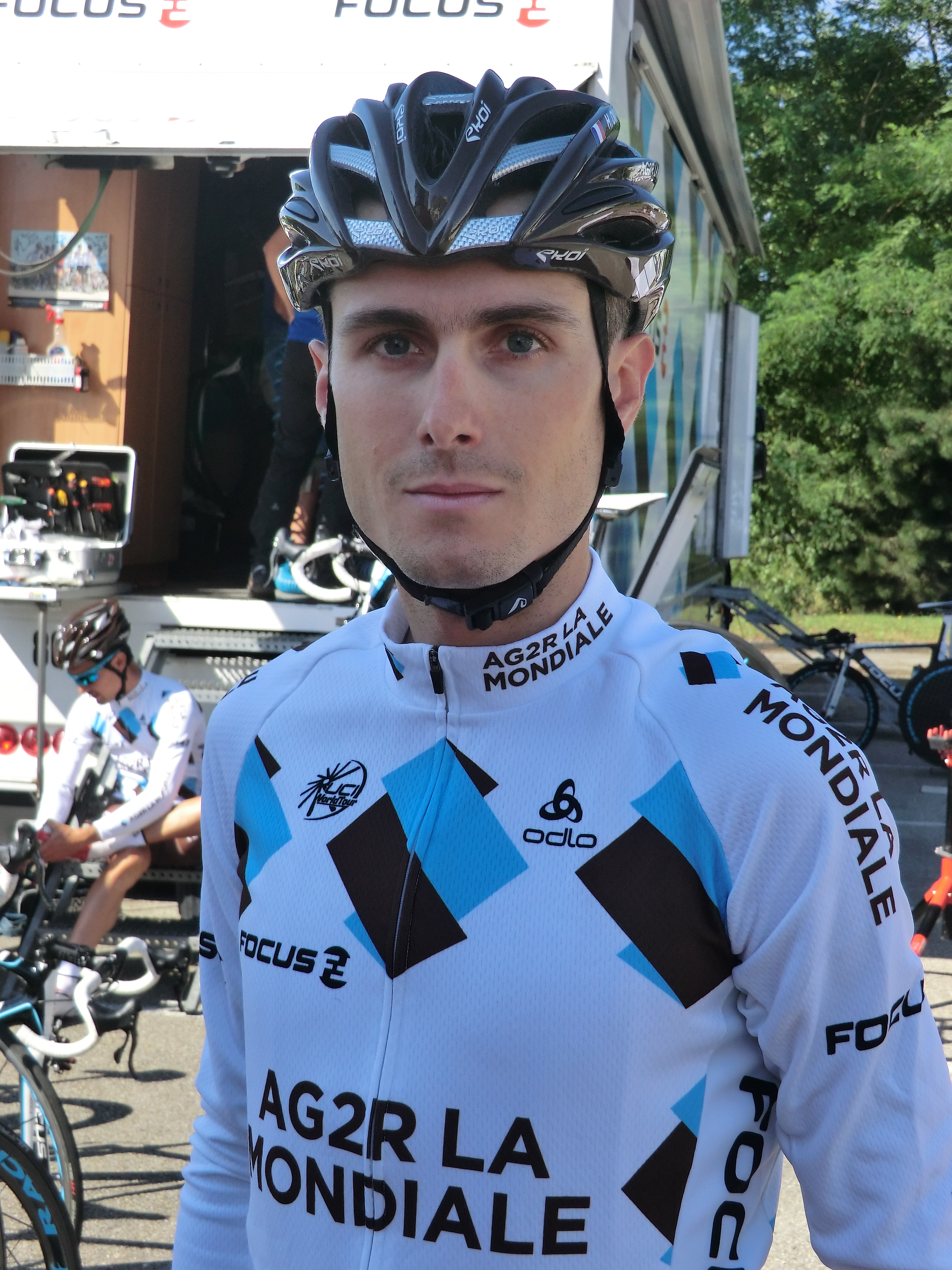
- Dupont at the 2013 Tour de l'Ain

Personal information
- Full name: Hubert Dupont
- Born: 13 November 1980 (age 45) Lyon, France
- Height: 1.74 m (5 ft 9 in)
- Weight: 59 kg (130 lb)

Cycling career
- Sport: Cycling
- Discipline: Road
- Role: Rider
- Rider type: Climber

Professional teams
- 2005: R.A.G.T. Semences
- 2006–2019: AG2R Prévoyance

Hubert Dupont (born 13 November 1980 in Lyon) is a French former professional road bicycle racer, who competed professionally between 2005 and 2019 for the R.A.G.T. Semences and AG2R La Mondiale teams. His sporting career began with AC Lyon Vaise.

== Major results ==
2003
1st Les Monts Luberon
1st Stage 1a (TTT) Giro della Valle d'Aosta
2004
1st Stage 5 Giro Ciclistico d'Italia
2nd Les Boucles du Sud Ardèche
4th Les Monts Luberon
8th Overall Tour des Pyrénées
2005
4th Les Monts Luberon
9th Overall Critérium des Espoirs
2006
1st Mountains classification Tour of the Basque Country
6th Overall Route du Sud
7th Tour du Doubs
10th Overall Tour du Limousin
2007
4th Tour du Doubs
2008
6th Overall Route du Sud
2009
5th Road race, National Road Championships
7th GP Miguel Induráin
10th Overall Tour de l'Ain
2012
2nd Overall Route du Sud
7th Overall Giro del Trentino
9th Overall Critérium International
2013
7th Overall Route du Sud
2016
3rd Overall Tour du Limousin
10th Overall Giro del Trentino
2017
8th Grand Prix d'Ouverture La Marseillaise
10th Overall Route du Sud
10th Overall Tour du Limousin
2018
7th Overall Route d'Occitanie

=== Grand Tour general classification results timeline ===
Grand Tour	2006	2007	2008	2009	2010	2011	2012	2013	2014	2015	2016	2017	2018	2019
Giro d'Italia	32	25	—	—	20	12	16	32	16	42	11	19	20	47
Tour de France	—	—	55	33	—	22	DNF	34	—	—	—	—	—	—
Vuelta a España	40	17	32	—	55	—	—	—	54	—	—	—	26	—

Legend
—	Did not compete
DNF	Did not finish
