= Romain Lemarchand =

French road cyclist

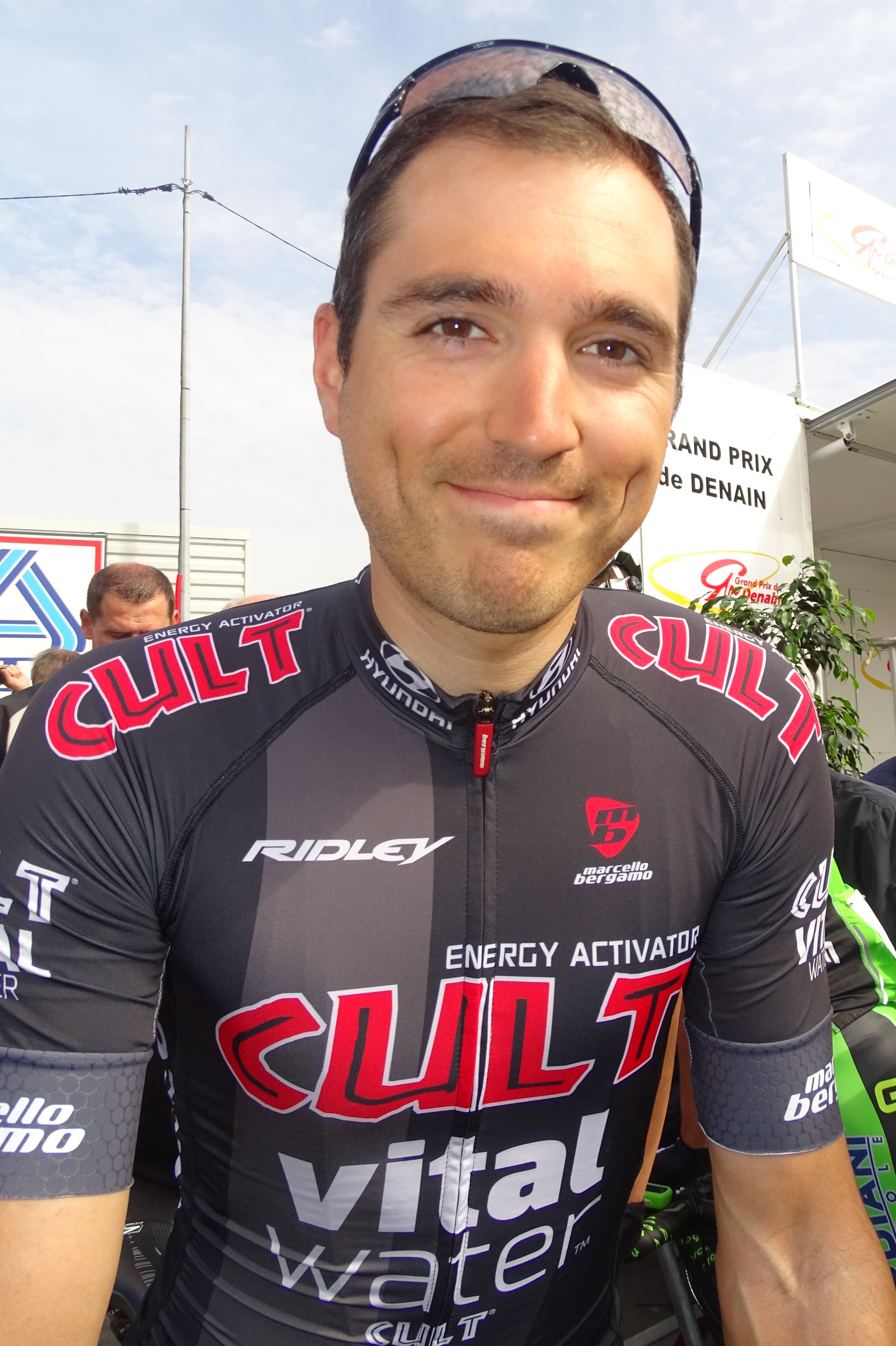
- Lemarchand at the 2015 Grand Prix de Denain.

Personal information
- Full name: Romain Lemarchand
- Born: 26 July 1987 (age 39) Longjumeau, France
- Height: 1.78 m (5 ft 10 in)
- Weight: 67 kg (148 lb)

Cycling career
- Sport: Cycling
- Current team: Retired
- Discipline: Road
- Role: Rider

Amateur teams
- 2007–2009: CM Aubervilliers
- 2008: Auber 93 (stagiaire)
- 2009: Auber 93 (stagiaire)

Professional teams
- 2010: BigMat–Auber 93
- 2011–2012: Ag2r–La Mondiale
- 2013–2014: Cofidis
- 2015: Cult Energy Pro Cycling
- 2016: Stölting Service Group
- 2017: Delko–Marseille Provence KTM

Romain Lemarchand (born 26 July 1987) is a French former road cyclist, who competed professionally between 2010 and 2017 for the BigMat–Auber 93, Ag2r–La Mondiale, Cofidis, Cult Energy Pro Cycling, Stölting Service Group and Delko–Marseille Provence KTM teams.

== Major results ==
2007
5th Chrono des Nations Espoirs
2008
5th Chrono des Nations Espoirs
2009
1st Time trial, National Under-23 Road Championships
2010
4th Paris–Mantes-en-Yvelines
5th Overall Ronde de l'Oise
7th Tour du Doubs
9th Tro-Bro Léon
9th Tour de la Somme
2013
10th Overall Tour du Limousin
2014
10th Overall Arctic Race of Norway
