= Sébastien Minard =

Road bicycle racer

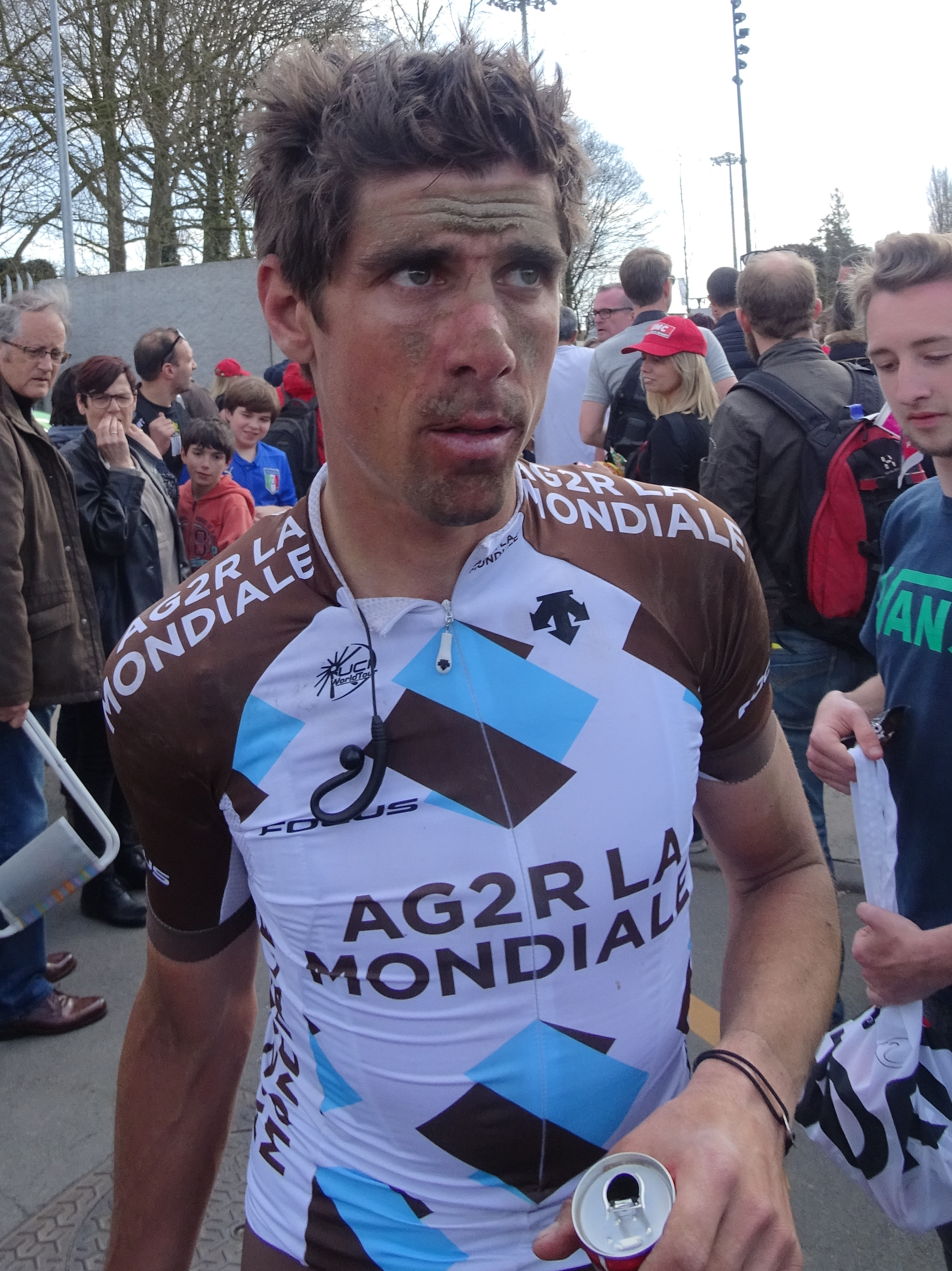
- Minard at the 2015 Paris–Roubaix

Personal information
- Full name: Sébastien Minard
- Born: 12 June 1982 (age 44) Senlis, France
- Height: 1.77 m (5 ft 10 in)
- Weight: 65 kg (143 lb)

Cycling career
- Sport: Cycling
- Current team: Retired
- Discipline: Road
- Role: Rider

Professional teams
- 2005: R.A.G.T. Semences
- 2006–2010: Cofidis
- 2011–2016: Ag2r–La Mondiale

Sébastien Minard (born 12 June 1982) is a French former professional road bicycle racer, who rode professionally between 2005 and 2016 for the R.A.G.T. Semences, Cofidis and AG2R La Mondiale teams. His sporting career began with SV Senlis.

== Major results ==
2002
6th Grand Prix de la ville de Nogent-sur-Oise
2004
1st Stage 1 Bidasoa Itzulia
2nd La Roue Tourangelle
2nd Grand Prix de Waregem
2nd Grand Prix de la ville de Nogent-sur-Oise
3rd Paris–Troyes
3rd Paris–Tours Espoirs
10th Paris–Roubaix Espoirs
2005
1st Stage 10 Tour de l'Avenir
7th Boucle de l'Artois
2006
8th Paris–Bourges
2007
5th Overall Étoile de Bessèges
7th Overall Tour de Picardie
2009
4th Tour du Finistère
5th Overall Étoile de Bessèges
2010
1st Paris–Camembert
5th Polynormande
6th Route Adélie
2012
10th Paris–Camembert
2013
4th Overall Tour de Picardie
2014
8th Paris–Camembert
2016
10th Tro-Bro Léon

=== Grand Tour general classification results timeline ===
Grand Tour	2006	2007	2008	2009	2010	2011	2012	2013	2014	2015	2016
Giro d'Italia	Did not contest during career										
Tour de France	—	—	—	38	92	110	65	124	99	—	—
Vuelta a España	43	57	71	—	102	—	—	—	—	96	DNF

Legend
—	Did not compete
DNF	Did not finish
