= Guillaume Bonnafond =

French cyclist

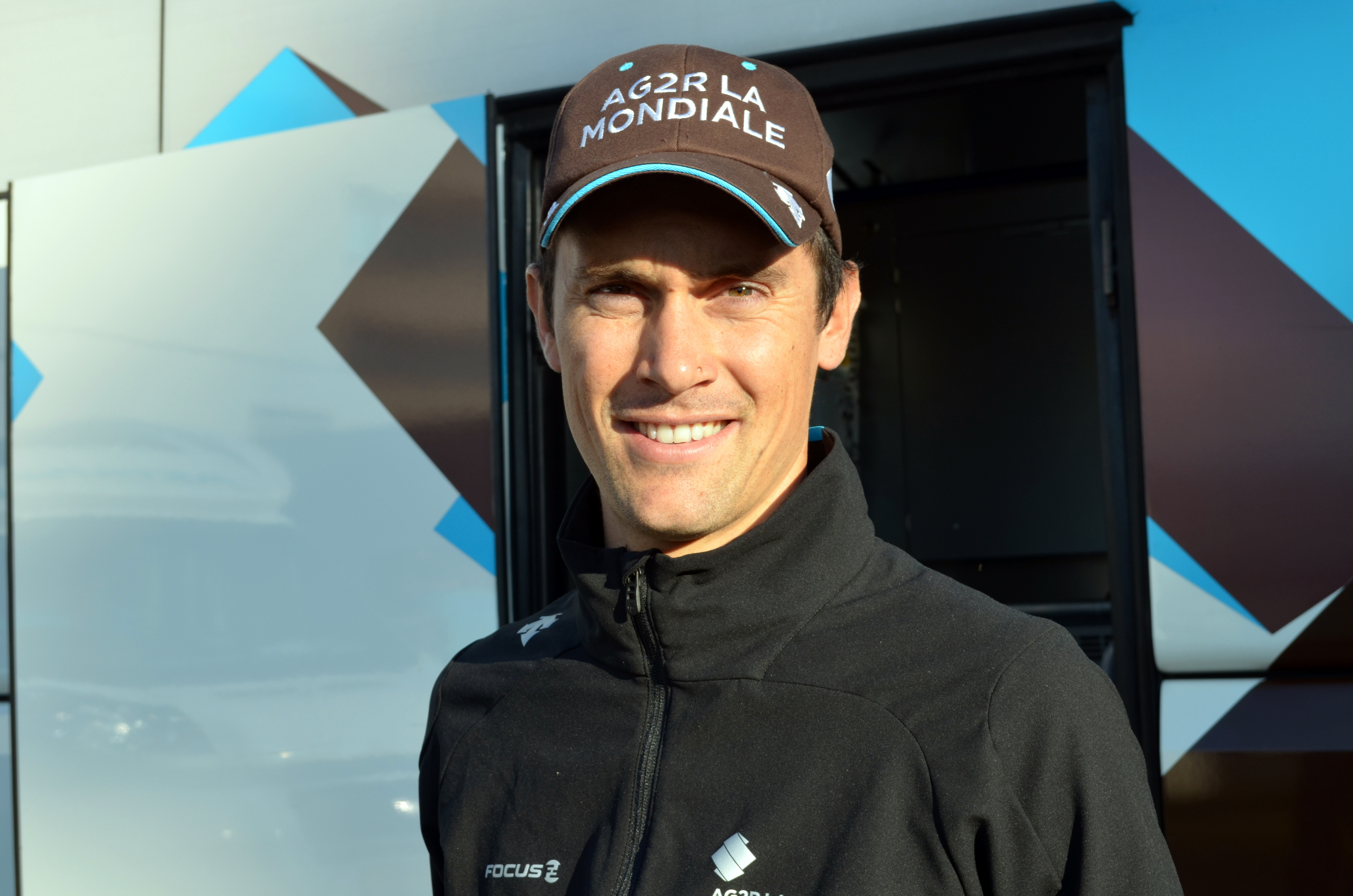
- Bonnafond at the 2014 Tour de l'Ain

Personal information
- Full name: Guillaume Bonnafond
- Born: 23 June 1987 (age 39) Valence, France
- Height: 1.84 m (6 ft 1/2 in)
- Weight: 66 kg (146 lb)

Cycling career
- Sport: Cycling
- Current team: Retired
- Discipline: Road
- Role: Rider
- Rider type: Climber

Amateur teams
- 2006–2008: Chambéry CF
- 2008: Ag2r–La Mondiale (stagiaire)

Professional teams
- 2009–2016: Ag2r–La Mondiale
- 2017–2018: Cofidis

Guillaume Bonnafond (born 23 June 1987) is a French former professional road bicycle racer, who rode professionally between 2009 and 2018 for the AG2R La Mondiale and Cofidis teams. He had excelled at both basketball and cycling as a youth, but eventually concentrated on the latter, training with Ag2r–La Mondiale's Chambéry Cyclisme Formation, subsequently joining the squad as an amateur and, in 2009 as a professional.

== Amateur career ==
Born in Valence, Bonnafond finished third in the general classification of the Tour de Lorraine as a junior, and he won the overall rankings of the Tour du Valromey, both in 2005. In the following season he recorded two third spots in two stages of the Tour de la Réunion and in 2007 there were two second spots (in stage 1B of the Tour des Pays de Savoie and stage 4 of the Giro della Valle d'Aosta) and two third spots (in the Grand Prix des Vins du Brulhois and in stage 1 of the Tour du Gévaudan. Then 2008 turned out to be his breakthrough year on amateur level. He was added to the Decathlon CMA CGM Team team and with a second place in the Berner Rundfahrt, a third place in the Classique Sauveterre Pyrénées Atlantique and another second place in the first stage of the Tour du Chablais he started the season well. In the Ronde de l'Isard d'Ariège he won the fourth stage of the under-23 competition finishing in front of Blel Kadri and also managed to win the overall rankings that way. He then went back to ride in the Tour des Pays de Savoie again, this time with more success than the year before as he managed to win stage 1, towards La Toussuire, stage 2 towards Chambéry and the general classification in front of Julien Bérard. Later that year he rode to the third place in the Flèche Ardennaise, the second spot in the French national amateurs road championship, a second place in the Grand Prix Cristal Energie and a third spot in the Piccolo Giro di Lombardia.

== Professional career ==
In his first season as a professional he made his debut for the Ag2r–La Mondiale team in the Tour de Langkawi where he finished in 32nd spot overall. In preparation of his first grand tour Bonnafond ended up in 29th place of the Giro del Trentino and the 32nd place of the 2009 Tour de Romandie. In his first grand tour, the 2009 Giro d'Italia he managed to reach the finish line of the 21st stage in Rome to complete the race in 85th position. His best result was a 22nd spot in the 14th stage from Campi Bisenzio to Bologna. He finished his first professional season with a 12th spot in the Route du Sud and a fifth place in the fifth stage of the Tour de l'Avenir

The 2010 season started off in January when he took part in La Tropicale Amissa Bongo, a stage race in Gabon. There he finished in fifth position in stage 3, third position in stage 6 and 18th overall. Also this year he prepared for the Giro d'Italia in the Giro del Trentino, improving his 2009 result to 22nd. However this time he did not manage to complete the 2010 Giro d'Italia as he did not finish stage 6 towards Marina di Carrara. In the 2010 Critérium du Dauphiné he finished in 66th position overall and in 8th position in the mountains classification. The second grand tour he completed was the 2010 Vuelta a España, which he did in 57th place. Late he would ride to the 22nd spot in the Giro di Lombardia to finish the season.

In the 2011 pre-season Bonnafond tried his luck in some of the classic races. He started off with a 32nd spot in Paris–Camembert, but did not finish the 2011 Amstel Gold Race and the 2011 Liège-Bastogne-Liège. Following those results he did not participate in the Giro d'Italia, but did finish another grand tour by completing the 2011 Vuelta a España in 26th position overall.

== Career achievements ==
=== Major results ===
2005
1st Overall Tour du Valromey Juniors
3rd Overall Tour de Lorraine Juniors
2006
10th Paris–Tours Espoirs
2007
3rd Grand Prix des Vins du Brulhois
9th Paris–Tours Espoirs
2008
1st Overall Tour des Pays de Savoie

1st Stages 2 & 3

1st Overall Ronde de l'Isard

1st Stage 4

2nd Berner Rundfahrt
3rd Classique Sauveterre Pyrénées Atlantique
3rd Flèche Ardennaise
2nd Road race, National Amateur Road Championships
2nd Grand Prix Cristal Energie
3rd Piccolo Giro di Lombardia
2012
2nd Overall Paris–Corrèze
7th Overall Tour de l'Ain
2013
6th Overall Tour du Limousin
2015
9th Overall Tour du Limousin

=== Grand Tour general classification results timeline ===
Grand Tour	2009	2010	2011	2012	2013	2014	2015	2016	2017
Giro d'Italia	87	—	—	90	107	—	—	54	—
Tour de France	—	—	—	—	—	—	—	—	—
Vuelta a España	—	58	26	—	—	—	—	—	88

Legend
—	Did not compete
DNF	Did not finish
