= John Gadret =

French cyclist (born 1979)

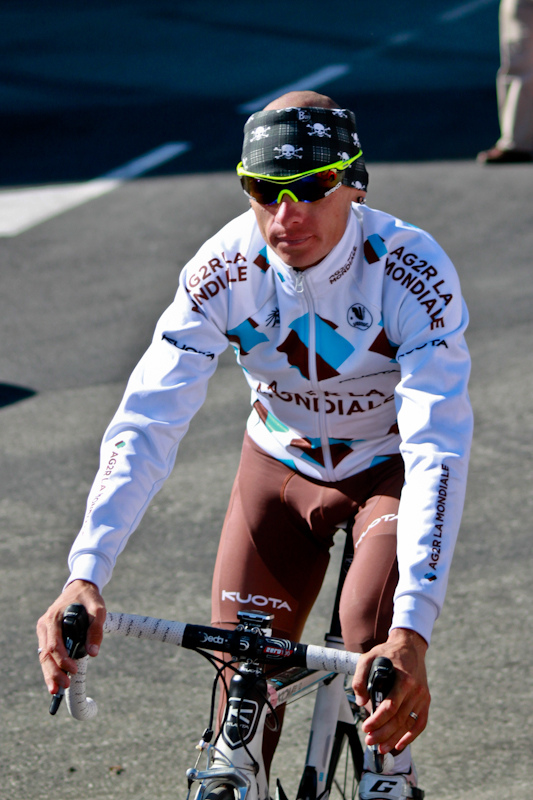
- Gadret riding in the 2011 Giro d'Italia

Personal information
- Full name: John Gadret
- Born: 22 April 1979 (age 47) Épernay, France
- Height: 1.70 m (5 ft 7 in)
- Weight: 58 kg (128 lb)

Cycling career
- Sport: Cycling
- Current team: USO Bruay-la-Buissière
- Disciplines: Road; Cyclo-cross
- Role: Rider
- Rider type: Climber

Amateur teams
- 1999–2003: VC Roubaix
- 2003: Cofidis (stagiaire)
- 2016: Cross Team By G4
- 2016–: USO Bruay-la-Buissière

Professional teams
- 2004–2005: Vlaanderen–T Interim
- 2006–2013: AG2R Prévoyance
- 2014–2015: Movistar Team

Major wins
- Road Grand Tours Giro d'Italia 1 individual stage (2011) Cyclo-cross National CX Championships (2004, 2006)

John Gadret (French: [dʒɔn ɡadʁɛ]; born 22 April 1979) is a French former professional racing cyclist in cyclo-cross and road racing, currently racing for the USO Bruay-la-Buissière amateur team. He became a stagiaire for Cofidis in 2003 before turning professional with the Vlaanderen–T Interim team in 2004.

== Career ==
In 2004 he became national cyclo-cross champion of France for the first time. At this stage he was specialized in the cyclo-cross discipline but was beginning to perform well in stage races such as the Deutschland Tour. Gadret won again the French cyclo-cross championships. In the 2006 Giro d'Italia Gadret showed great potential in the mountains by finishing 7th, 6th and 5th on the three mountain stages. He crashed on the 18th stage and was forced to abandon with a broken collarbone. Despite these promising results on the road, Gadret was back in the 2006–2007 cyclo-cross season where he challenged the domination of Belgian Sven Nys in the Koppenbergcross and finished 8th in the UCI World Cyclo-cross Championships. Returning to the road with the aim of competing in his first Tour de France, Gadret took his first road victory at the Grand Prix of Aargau Canton. After the 2007 Tour de France Gadret won the third stage and took the leader's jersey in the Tour de l'Ain which he won the following day.

On Stage 15 of the 2010 Tour de France Gadret caused controversy when he refused to give his wheel to his team leader, Nicolas Roche, following a puncture on the final climb of the day and then began attacking the group ahead of Roche. He later finished 19th overall.

He has won a race against a horse in a charity event.

In the 2011 Giro d'Italia, Gadret finished 3rd overall with a victory on stage 11. He finished 3' 54" behind race winner Michele Scarponi.

After eight seasons with Ag2r–La Mondiale, Gadret left the squad at the end of the 2013 season, and joined the Movistar Team for 2014. He was unable to secure a professional contract after the 2015 season, and returned to the amateur ranks.

== Career achievements ==
=== Cyclo-cross ===
1996–1997
3rd National Junior Championships
1998–1999
2nd National Under-23 Championships
2001–2002
3rd National Championships
2002–2003
2nd National Championships
2003–2004
1st National Championships
2004–2005
2nd National Championships
2005–2006
1st National Championships
2006–2007
2nd National Championships
Superprestige

3rd Gavere

2007–2008
2nd National Championships
2010–2011
2nd National Championships
2012–2013
3rd National Championships
2015–2016
3rd National Championships
2016–2017
3rd National Championships

=== Road ===
2005
3rd Grand Prix de Villers-Cotterêts
4th Tro-Bro Léon
9th Grand Prix de Wallonie
10th Trophée des Grimpeurs
2007
1st Overall Tour de l'Ain

1st Mountains classification
1st Stage 3

1st Grand Prix of Aargau Canton
7th Overall Volta a Catalunya
8th La Flèche Wallonne
2008
1st Stage 4 Tour de l'Ain
8th Overall Tour de Romandie
10th La Flèche Wallonne
2009
8th Overall Tour de l'Ain
2010
6th Overall Route du Sud
2011
3rd Overall Giro d'Italia

1st Stage 11

6th Tour du Doubs
7th Overall Tour de l'Ain
2013
3rd Overall Route du Sud
3rd Overall Tour de l'Ain
10th Overall Critérium International
10th Overall Tour of the Basque Country

=== Grand Tour general classification results timeline ===
Grand Tour	2004	2005	2006	2007	2008	2009	2010	2011	2012	2013	2014
Giro d'Italia	DNF	—	DNF	—	—	—	13	3	11	—	—
Tour de France	—	—	—	54	DNF	—	18	DNF	—	22	19
/ Vuelta a España	—	—	—	—	18	DNF	—	—	DNF	—	—

Legend
—	Did not compete
DNF	Did not finish
