= Julien Bérard =

French cyclist

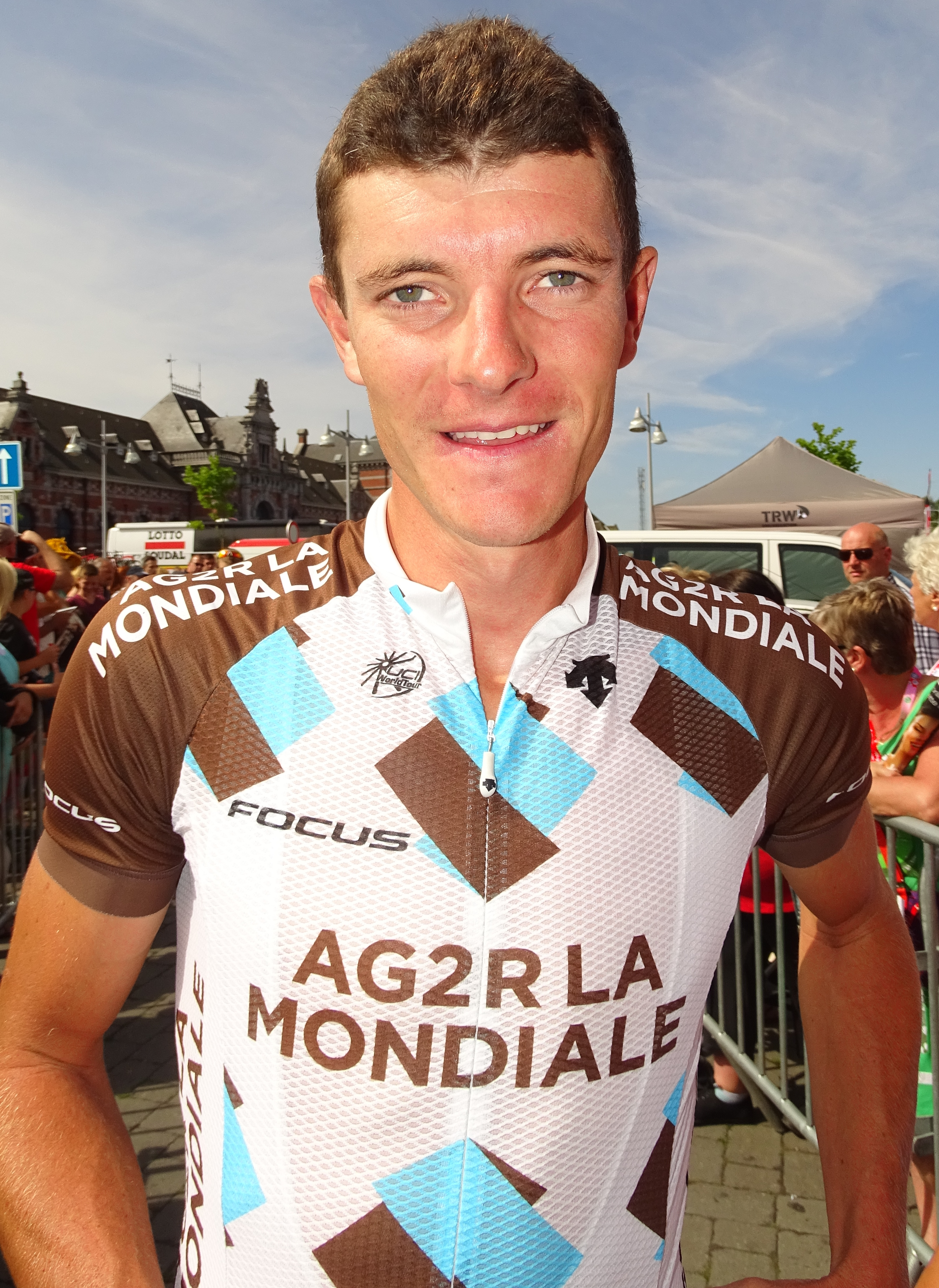
- Bérard at the 2015 Grand Prix Pino Cerami

Personal information
- Full name: Julien Bérard
- Born: 27 July 1987 (age 39) Paris, France
- Height: 1.85 m (6 ft 1 in)
- Weight: 70 kg (154 lb)

Cycling career
- Sport: Cycling
- Current team: Retired
- Discipline: Road
- Role: Rider
- Rider type: Puncheur

Amateur teams
- 2006–2009: Chambéry CF
- 2008: Ag2r–La Mondiale (stagiaire)

Professional team
- 2010–2017: Ag2r–La Mondiale

Julien Bérard (born 27 July 1987) is a French former professional road bicycle racer, who rode professionally between 2010 and 2017, entirely for the AG2R La Mondiale team.

== Amateur career ==
Born in Paris, Bérard recorded his first notable result in July 2005 when he won the third stage of the junior edition of the Tour du Valromey. In another stage during that same stage race he finished in second position. In 2008 he started as a stagiaire for the Ag2r–La Mondiale team. He claimed his first podium finish, at the Tour des Pays de Savoie where he finished in second position in stage 3, and also finished second overall in the general classification. In the Tour de la Creuse he managed to finish in third position in the second stage, but he also claimed the victory in the general classification standings for that race. His first real road race win at senior level was a win in the second stage of the Tour du Gévaudan Languedoc-Roussillon with the finish in Mende.

Bérard maintained his spot at Chambéry CF for the 2009 season in which he claimed his first victory on 28 March, when he finished 32 seconds in front of the runner-up at the Grand Prix Saint-Etienne Loire. In the Tour du Périgord - A Travers les Bastides he finished third and he won the third stage of the Ronde de l'Isard. That result was followed by two second places in the first stage of the Tour des Pays de Savoie and the Mi-Aout Bretonne. In that last race he also claimed the third spot in the general classification. In the Tour de l'Avenir he booked his biggest success as an amateur, by winning the first stage of the race in Dreux, France, ahead of Romain Sicard and Dennis van Winden.

== Professional career ==
Ag2r–La Mondiale offered him a professional contract for the 2010 season, in which he struggled to come up with some top-three results. His best results of that season were accomplished during the La Tropicale Amissa Bongo race in Gabon. Here he finished fifth in the second stage, seventh in the fourth stage and sixth in the general classification. In 2011 Bérard made his debut in one of the grand tours when he was called up for the Giro d'Italia. Without any serious race winning attempts Bérard managed to complete the prestigious stage race in Milan with a 122nd place in the general classification. During the French National Road Race Championships in Boulogne-sur-Mer, Bérard finished in fourth position behind Sylvain Chavanel, Anthony Roux and Thomas Voeckler. Later in the season, he took a third-place finish in the Tour du Doubs.

== Major results ==
2008
1st Overall Tour de la Creuse
1st Stage 2 Tour du Gévaudan Languedoc-Roussillon
2nd Overall Tour des Pays de Savoie
2009
1st Grand Prix Saint-Etienne Loire
1st Stage 1 Tour de l'Avenir
3rd Overall Mi-Aout-Bretonne
3rd Tour du Perigord - A Travers les Bastides
10th Overall Ronde de l'Isard

1st Stage 4

10th Boucles du Sud-Ardèche
2010
6th Overall La Tropicale Amissa Bongo
8th Polynormande
2011
3rd Tour du Doubs
4th Road race, National Road Championships
2012
8th Route Adélie
2013
10th Route Adélie
2014
4th Classic Loire Atlantique
10th Overall Route du Sud
10th Route Adélie

=== Grand Tour general classification results timeline ===
Grand Tour	2011	2012	2013	2014	2015	2016	2017
Giro d'Italia	123	110	DNF	70	105	—	131
Tour de France	Did not contest during his career						
Vuelta a España	—	—	94	—	—	—	—

Legend
—	Did not compete
DNF	Did not finish
