= List of teams and cyclists in the 2012 Vuelta a España =

The 2012 Vuelta a España was the 67th edition of the Vuelta a España, one of the cycling's Grand Tours. The Vuelta a España features 198 riders competing from 22 cycling teams; the race took place from 18 August to 9 September, starting in Pamplona and finishing in Madrid.

== Teams ==
All eighteen UCI ProTeams were automatically invited and were obliged to attend the race. Four UCI Professional Continental teams were given wildcard places into the race, to complete a 22-team peloton.

The 22 teams that competed in the race were:

- Ag2r–La Mondiale
- Andalucía*
- Argos–Shimano*
- Astana
- BMC Racing Team
- Caja Rural*
- Cofidis*
- Euskaltel–Euskadi
- FDJ–BigMat
- Garmin–Sharp
- Lampre–ISD
- Liquigas–Cannondale
- Lotto–Belisol
- Movistar Team
- Omega Pharma–Quick-Step
- Orica–GreenEDGE
- Rabobank
- RadioShack–Nissan
- Saxo Bank–Tinkoff Bank
- Team Katusha
- Team Sky
- Vacansoleil–DCM

*: Pro Continental teams given wild card entry to this event.

== By rider ==
Legend
No.	Starting number worn by the rider during the Vuelta
Pos.	Position in the general classification
A yellow jersey	Denotes the winner of the General classification
A green jersey	Denotes the winner of the Points classification
A white jersey with blue dots	Denotes the winner of the Mountains classification
A white jersey	Denotes the winner of the Combination classification
DNS	Denotes a rider who did not start, followed by the stage before which he withdrew
DNF	Denotes a rider who did not finish, followed by the stage in which he withdrew
HD	Denotes a rider finished outside the time limit, followed by the stage in which he did so
DSQ	Denotes a rider who was disqualified from the race, followed by the stage in which this occurred
Age correct as of 18 August 2012, the date on which the Vuelta began

No.	Rider	Team	Position
1	(Spain) Juan José Cobo	Movistar Team	67
2	(Spain) Jonathan Castroviejo	Movistar Team	148
3	(Spain) Imanol Erviti	Movistar Team	132
4	(Spain) Beñat Intxausti	Movistar Team	10
5	(Spain) Pablo Lastras	Movistar Team	74
6	(Spain) Javier Moreno	Movistar Team	66
7	(Colombia) Nairo Quintana	Movistar Team	36
8	(Spain) José Joaquín Rojas	Movistar Team	DNS-14
9	(Spain) Alejandro Valverde	Movistar Team	2
11	(France) John Gadret	Ag2r–La Mondiale	DNS-10
12	(France) Maxime Bouet	Ag2r–La Mondiale	20
13	(Luxembourg) Ben Gastauer	Ag2r–La Mondiale	81
14	(France) Blel Kadri	Ag2r–La Mondiale	169
15	(France) Lloyd Mondory	Ag2r–La Mondiale	104
16	(Italy) Matteo Montaguti	Ag2r–La Mondiale	72
17	(Italy) Rinaldo Nocentini	Ag2r–La Mondiale	18
18	(France) Christophe Riblon	Ag2r–La Mondiale	162
19	(Republic of Ireland) Nicolas Roche	Ag2r–La Mondiale	12
21	(Spain) Adrián Palomares	Andalucía	112
22	(Spain) Sergio Carrasco	Andalucía	94
23	(Spain) Gustavo César	Andalucía	114
24	(Spain) Javier Chacón	Andalucía	161
25	(Spain) Pablo Lechuga	Andalucía	DNF-16
26	(Spain) Juan José Lobato	Andalucía	174
27	(Spain) Javier Ramirez Abeja	Andalucía	120
28	(Spain) Jesús Rosendo	Andalucía	DNS-19
29	(Spain) José Vicente Toribio	Andalucía	133
31	(Sweden) Fredrik Kessiakoff	Astana	61
32	(Kazakhstan) Assan Bazayev	Astana	DNF-20
33	(Kazakhstan) Alexsandr Dyachenko	Astana	137
34	(Italy) Enrico Gasparotto	Astana	OTL-1
35	(Kazakhstan) Andrey Kashechkin	Astana	34
36	(Belgium) Kevin Seeldraeyers	Astana	39
37	(Russia) Egor Silin	Astana	122
38	(Italy) Paolo Tiralongo	Astana	38
39	(Kazakhstan) Andrey Zeits	Astana	52
41	(Belgium) Philippe Gilbert	BMC Racing Team	59
42	(Italy) Alessandro Ballan	BMC Racing Team	63
43	(United States) Brent Bookwalter	BMC Racing Team	78
44	(United Kingdom) Steve Cummings	BMC Racing Team	156
45	(Belgium) Yannick Eijssen	BMC Racing Team	119
46	(Belgium) Klaas Lodewyck	BMC Racing Team	116
47	(France) Amaël Moinard	BMC Racing Team	99
48	(Switzerland) Steve Morabito	BMC Racing Team	35
49	(Italy) Mauro Santambrogio	BMC Racing Team	58
51	(Spain) Javier Aramendia	Caja Rural	170
52	(Bulgaria) Danail Andonov Petrov	Caja Rural	168
53	(Portugal) Hernani Broco	Caja Rural	53
54	(Portugal) André Cardoso	Caja Rural	21
55	(Portugal) Manuel Antonio Cardoso	Caja Rural	160
56	(Spain) David de la Fuente	Caja Rural	65
57	(Spain) Aitor Galdós	Caja Rural	173
58	(Spain) Marcos García	Caja Rural	27
59	(Spain) Antonio Piedra	Caja Rural	84
61	(France) David Moncoutié	Cofidis	109
62	(France) Yohann Bagot	Cofidis	DNS-8
63	(France) Florent Barle	Cofidis	129
64	(France) Mickaël Buffaz	Cofidis	45
65	(Colombia) Leonardo Duque	Cofidis	80
66	(Spain) Egoitz García	Cofidis	101
67	(Spain) Luis Ángel Maté	Cofidis	47
68	(France) Rudy Molard	Cofidis	113
69	(Belgium) Nico Sijmens	Cofidis	87
71	(Spain) Igor Antón	Euskaltel–Euskadi	9
72	(Spain) Mikel Astarloza	Euskaltel–Euskadi	48
73	(Spain) Mikel Landa	Euskaltel–Euskadi	69
74	(Spain) Juan José Oroz	Euskaltel–Euskadi	50
75	(Spain) Ruben Perez	Euskaltel–Euskadi	75
76	(France) Romain Sicard	Euskaltel–Euskadi	44
77	(Spain) Amets Txurruka	Euskaltel–Euskadi	30
78	(Spain) Iván Velasco	Euskaltel–Euskadi	26
79	(Spain) Gorka Verdugo	Euskaltel–Euskadi	11
81	(France) Arnold Jeannesson	FDJ–BigMat	64
82	(France) William Bonnet	FDJ–BigMat	152
83	(France) David Boucher	FDJ–BigMat	DNF-4
84	(France) Nacer Bouhanni	FDJ–BigMat	DNF-13
85	(France) Arnaud Courteille	FDJ–BigMat	154
86	(France) Rémi Pauriol	FDJ–BigMat	23
87	(Norway) Gabriel Rasch	FDJ–BigMat	118
88	(Canada) Dominique Rollin	FDJ–BigMat	153
89	(France) Benoît Vaugrenard	FDJ–BigMat	136
91	(United States) Andrew Talansky	Garmin–Sharp	7
92	(Netherlands) Thomas Dekker	Garmin–Sharp	149
93	(Spain) Koldo Fernández	Garmin–Sharp	134
94	(Netherlands) Michel Kreder	Garmin–Sharp	96
95	(Netherlands) Raymond Kreder	Garmin–Sharp	172
96	(France) Christophe Le Mével	Garmin–Sharp	31
97	(Netherlands) Martijn Maaskant	Garmin–Sharp	150
98	(United States) Thomas Peterson	Garmin–Sharp	115
99	(Belgium) Johan Vansummeren	Garmin–Sharp	79
101	(Spain) Joaquim Rodríguez	Team Katusha	3
102	(Russia) Pavel Brutt	Team Katusha	106
103	(Spain) Xavier Florencio	Team Katusha	105
104	(Russia) Mikhail Ignatiev	Team Katusha	171
105	(Spain) Alberto Losada	Team Katusha	37
106	(Russia) Denis Menchov	Team Katusha	54
107	(Spain) Daniel Moreno	Team Katusha	5
108	(Latvia) Gatis Smukulis	Team Katusha	117
109	(Spain) Ángel Vicioso	Team Katusha	95
111	(Italy) Damiano Cunego	Lampre–ISD	33
112	(Colombia) Winner Anacona	Lampre–ISD	19
113	(Italy) Davide Cimolai	Lampre–ISD	163
114	(Ukraine) Denys Kostyuk	Lampre–ISD	56
115	(Ukraine) Oleksandr Kvachuk	Lampre–ISD	125
116	(Italy) Marco Marzano	Lampre–ISD	73
117	(Poland) Przemysław Niemiec	Lampre–ISD	15
118	(Italy) Morris Possoni	Lampre–ISD	DNS-13
119	(Italy) Davide Viganò	Lampre–ISD	141
121	(Italy) Eros Capecchi	Liquigas–Cannondale	25
122	(Poland) Maciej Bodnar	Liquigas–Cannondale	138
123	(Italy) Mauro Da Dalto	Liquigas–Cannondale	130
124	(Italy) Tiziano Dall'Antonia	Liquigas–Cannondale	140
125	(Poland) Maciej Paterski	Liquigas–Cannondale	89
126	(Italy) Daniele Ratto	Liquigas–Cannondale	DNF-12
127	(Italy) Cristiano Salerno	Liquigas–Cannondale	49
128	(Colombia) Cayetano Sarmiento	Liquigas–Cannondale	60
129	(Italy) Elia Viviani	Liquigas–Cannondale	128
131	(Belgium) Jurgen Van den Broeck	Lotto–Belisol	DNS-14
132	(Belgium) Bart De Clercq	Lotto–Belisol	17
133	(Belgium) Jens Debusschere	Lotto–Belisol	DNS-14
134	(Australia) Adam Hansen	Lotto–Belisol	123
135	(Belgium) Olivier Kaisen	Lotto–Belisol	DNF-14
136	(Belgium) Gianni Meersman	Lotto–Belisol	57
137	(Spain) Vicente Reynés	Lotto–Belisol	82
138	(Netherlands) Joost van Leijen	Lotto–Belisol	DNF-17
139	(Belgium) Frederik Willems	Lotto–Belisol	142
141	(Germany) Tony Martin	Omega Pharma–Quick-Step	DNF-20
142	(Italy) Dario Cataldo	Omega Pharma–Quick-Step	51
143	(Belgium) Kevin De Weert	Omega Pharma–Quick-Step	41
144	(Belgium) Serge Pauwels	Omega Pharma–Quick-Step	24
145	(Czech Republic) František Raboň	Omega Pharma–Quick-Step	157
146	(Belgium) Gert Steegmans	Omega Pharma–Quick-Step	110
147	(Czech Republic) Zdeněk Štybar	Omega Pharma–Quick-Step	76
148	(Netherlands) Niki Terpstra	Omega Pharma–Quick-Step	127
149	(Belgium) Kristof Vandewalle	Omega Pharma–Quick-Step	91
151	(Australia) Allan Davis	Orica–GreenEDGE	167
152	(Australia) Simon Clarke	Orica–GreenEDGE	77
153	(New Zealand) Julian Dean	Orica–GreenEDGE	158
154	(Australia) Mitchell Docker	Orica–GreenEDGE	166
155	(Australia) Cameron Meyer	Orica–GreenEDGE	DNS-16
156	(Australia) Travis Meyer	Orica–GreenEDGE	165
157	(Australia) Wesley Sulzberger	Orica–GreenEDGE	145
158	(Eritrea) Daniel Teklehaymanot	Orica–GreenEDGE	146
159	(Netherlands) Pieter Weening	Orica–GreenEDGE	88
161	(Netherlands) Robert Gesink	Rabobank	6
162	(Netherlands) Lars Boom	Rabobank	107
163	(Denmark) Matti Breschel	Rabobank	159
164	(Netherlands) Stef Clement	Rabobank	100
165	(Spain) Juan Manuel Gárate	Rabobank	42
166	(Netherlands) Bauke Mollema	Rabobank	28
167	(Germany) Grischa Niermann	Rabobank	103
168	(Netherlands) Laurens ten Dam	Rabobank	8
169	(Netherlands) Dennis van Winden	Rabobank	164
171	(Belgium) Maxime Monfort	RadioShack–Nissan	16
172	(Belgium) Jan Bakelants	RadioShack–Nissan	22
173	(Italy) Daniele Bennati	RadioShack–Nissan	144
174	(Luxembourg) Laurent Didier	RadioShack–Nissan	86
175	(Germany) Linus Gerdemann	RadioShack–Nissan	DNF-18
176	(Spain) Markel Irizar	RadioShack–Nissan	93
177	(Portugal) Tiago Machado	RadioShack–Nissan	40
178	(Switzerland) Grégory Rast	RadioShack–Nissan	92
179	(New Zealand) Hayden Roulston	RadioShack–Nissan	DNS-13
181	(United Kingdom) Chris Froome	Team Sky	4
182	(Spain) Juan Antonio Flecha	Team Sky	98
183	(Colombia) Sergio Henao	Team Sky	14
184	(United States) Danny Pate	Team Sky	147
185	(Australia) Richie Porte	Team Sky	68
186	(United Kingdom) Ian Stannard	Team Sky	111
187	(United Kingdom) Ben Swift	Team Sky	121
188	(Colombia) Rigoberto Urán	Team Sky	29
189	(Spain) Xabier Zandio	Team Sky	DNF-12
191	(Germany) John Degenkolb	Argos–Shimano	131
192	(Netherlands) Koen de Kort	Argos–Shimano	85
193	(Japan) Yukihiro Doi	Argos–Shimano	139
194	(Netherlands) Tom Dumoulin	Argos–Shimano	DNF-8
195	(Germany) Johannes Fröhlinger	Argos–Shimano	83
196	(France) Alexandre Geniez	Argos–Shimano	90
197	(Germany) Simon Geschke	Argos–Shimano	71
198	(France) Thierry Hupond	Argos–Shimano	124
199	(China) Ji Cheng	Argos–Shimano	175
201	(Spain) Alberto Contador	Saxo Bank–Tinkoff Bank	1
202	(Spain) Jesús Hernández	Saxo Bank–Tinkoff Bank	43
203	(Poland) Rafał Majka	Saxo Bank–Tinkoff Bank	32
204	(Spain) Daniel Navarro	Saxo Bank–Tinkoff Bank	55
205	(Spain) Benjamín Noval	Saxo Bank–Tinkoff Bank	108
206	(Portugal) Sérgio Paulinho	Saxo Bank–Tinkoff Bank	70
207	(Portugal) Bruno Pires	Saxo Bank–Tinkoff Bank	97
208	(Denmark) Nicki Sørensen	Saxo Bank–Tinkoff Bank	155
209	(Italy) Matteo Tosatto	Saxo Bank–Tinkoff Bank	135
211	(Belgium) Thomas De Gendt	Vacansoleil–DCM	62
212	(Netherlands) Martijn Keizer	Vacansoleil–DCM	102
213	(Uzbekistan) Sergey Lagutin	Vacansoleil–DCM	46
214	(Netherlands) Pim Ligthart	Vacansoleil–DCM	126
215	(Netherlands) Bert-Jan Lindeman	Vacansoleil–DCM	143
216	(Poland) Tomasz Marczynski	Vacansoleil–DCM	13
217	(Netherlands) Wouter Mol	Vacansoleil–DCM	151
218	(Netherlands) Rob Ruijgh	Vacansoleil–DCM	DNF-17
219	(Spain) Rafael Valls	Vacansoleil–DCM	DNF-14

== See also ==
- 2012 Vuelta a España
