= 2012 Vuelta a España, Stage 1 to Stage 11 =

Cycling race stages

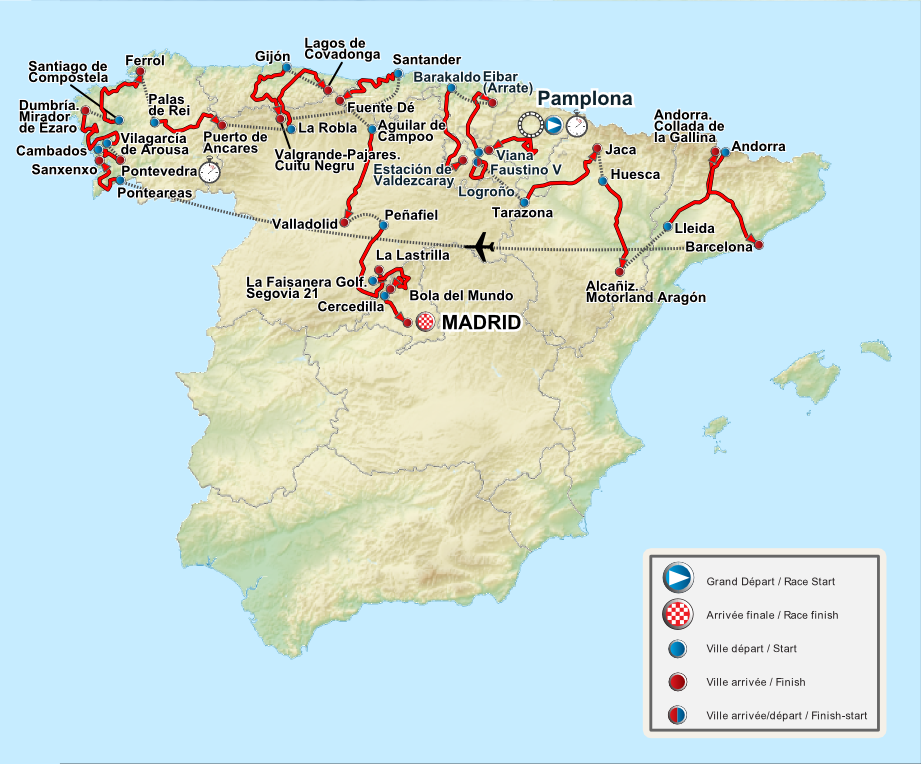
Overview of the stages; red lines represent distances covered in the individual stages, while black dotted lines are the distances covered in transfers between the stages.

The 2012 Vuelta a España began on 18 August, and stage 11 occurred on 29 August. The 2012 edition began with a team time trial stage – where each member of a team started together racing against the clock – in Pamplona, Navarre with the race remaining in Spain until the finish to the eighth stage, with a summit finish at the Collada de la Gallina in Andorra. After the ninth stage, the race's first rest day saw the riders travel across Spain by air from Barcelona to Ponteareas; a road stage was followed by the only individual time trial of the race, where each remaining member of the starting peloton of 198 riders competed against the clock.

The Movistar Team were the winners of the race-opening team time trial, recording a time ten seconds quicker than any other squad; their first rider to cross the line, Jonathan Castroviejo, became the first race leader as a result. He maintained his lead through the first mass-start stage the following day – the first of four stage victories for German sprinter John Degenkolb, who also won stages 5, 7 and 10 – but lost the lead following the first summit finish of the race in Eibar. The rojo jersey remained within the team however, as Alejandro Valverde picked up the race lead after pipping Joaquim Rodríguez in a photo-finish at the stage end. Valverde gave up the lead the following day, after crashing with several other members of his team just as the peloton's pace was being increased by the team on the front, Team Sky. As a result, Valverde apportioned blame to Team Sky, while his team manager, at one point, pulled alongside his opposite number from Team Sky for discussions. Rodríguez assumed the lead of the race then, but held a marginal one-second lead ahead of Chris Froome.

There were no changes in the classification until another summit finish on the sixth stage, when Rodríguez and Froome were the two contenders for the stage victory. Froome had attacked to bring himself and Rodríguez, but a second attack from Rodríguez brought him clear, and with time bonuses on the line, extended his lead to ten seconds. In Andorra, it again came down to the main favourites for the race; for a time, Alberto Contador attacked off the front and maintained a lead of around ten seconds – looking for his first victory since his return from a doping ban – before tying up and Valverde and Rodríguez beat him to the line, with Froome having cracked further back. Rodríguez put another twenty seconds into his lead the following day after attacking on the final climb, and his advantage of around a minute prior to the individual time trial was sufficient for him to maintain the lead after the stage; he put in the seventh-fastest time on the stage to keep the leader's jersey, but by only a second from Contador, who moved ahead of Froome in the classification. As a result, Rodríguez topped the overall standings with the more mountainous second half of the Vuelta still to race.

Legend (Note: Jerseys appearing in the table on the left of the page indicate those worn by the cyclist during the particular stage, while those appearing in the table on the right of the page indicate those awarded to the cyclist after the stage.)
A red jersey	Denotes the leader of the General classification	A bluedotted jersey	Denotes the leader of the Mountains classification
A green jersey	Denotes the leader of the Points classification	A white jersey	Denotes the leader of the Combination classification
A jersey with a white rider number on a red background	Denotes the rider designated as the day's most combative	s.t.	A rider that crossed the finish line in the same group as the one receiving the time above him and was therefore credited with the same finishing time.

== Stage 1 ==
18 August 2012 — Pamplona, 16.5 km (10.3 mi), team time trial (TTT)

For the third year in succession, the Vuelta began with a team time trial; on this occasion, it began in the Navarre city of Pamplona, hosting the Vuelta for the first time since 1994 when France's Laurent Jalabert won the thirteenth stage of that year's race. The stage itself was in and around Pamplona, with the final kilometre of the stage following the route of the Running of the Bulls, held as part of the festival of San Fermín the month before. Just like the bull-run, the stage finished in the middle of the Plaza de Toros, the city's main bullring. Caja Rural were the first of the race's 22 squads to begin the stage, wearing a different team kit to normal; having received dispensation from the Union Cycliste Internationale, the team wore white and red skin-suits instead of their customary green. However, with a time of 20' 18", the squad ultimately finished the stage in last place.

The teams entered the 16.5 km (10.3 mi) course at four-minute intervals; Orica–GreenEDGE were the second team in and comfortably lowered the earlier benchmark, recording a time almost a minute quicker. Garmin–Sharp, who won the team time trial in May's Giro d'Italia, were also setting a good time on course before a crash took down three of the team's riders, and delayed Andrew Talansky, the team's main general classification contender. BMC Racing Team were the next team to top the timesheets, setting a time of 19' 01" for the course, which held for some time. Rabobank started the stage slowly but a strong second half of the course pulled them into contention for stage honours, and ultimately edged out BMC Racing Team by a small margin. They were followed by Omega Pharma–Quick-Step, who also recorded a time of 19' 01", despite team members Tony Martin and Grand Tour debutant Zdeněk Štybar being led off course by a motorcycle. However, they were marginally quicker than both Rabobank and BMC Racing Team.

It was not until the final team to start the stage that the time – and the 19-minute barrier – was beaten. Movistar Team had the honour of starting last due to Juan José Cobo – the winner of the 2011 edition of the race for Geox–TMC – being amongst their nine riders. The team were only two seconds slower than Team Sky to the intermediate time-check, Movistar Team kept their pace up and recorded a time of 18' 51" for the course, to record the first Grand Tour team time trial victory for a Spanish squad in nine years. As the first rider to cross the line, Jonathan Castroviejo assumed the first red jersey of the race for the general classification leader, with four of his teammates in the same time and Cobo in sixth place, having been distanced, by four seconds, in the closing metres.

Stage 1 result

	Team	Time
1	Movistar Team	18' 51"
2	Omega Pharma–Quick-Step	+ 10"
3	Rabobank	+ 10"
4	BMC Racing Team	+ 10"
5	Team Sky	+ 12"
6	Lotto–Belisol	+ 12"
7	Saxo Bank–Tinkoff Bank	+ 14"
8	Team Katusha	+ 15"
9	Euskaltel–Euskadi	+ 28"
10	Orica–GreenEDGE	+ 33"

General classification after stage 1

	Rider	Team	Time
1	Jonathan Castroviejo (ESP)	Movistar Team	18' 51"
2	Javier Moreno (ESP)	Movistar Team	+ 0"
3	Beñat Intxausti (ESP)	Movistar Team	+ 0"
4	Nairo Quintana (COL)	Movistar Team	+ 0"
5	Alejandro Valverde (ESP)	Movistar Team	+ 0"
6	Juan José Cobo (ESP)	Movistar Team	+ 4"
7	Niki Terpstra (NED)	Omega Pharma–Quick-Step	+ 10"
8	Dario Cataldo (ITA)	Omega Pharma–Quick-Step	+ 10"
9	Kevin De Weert (BEL)	Omega Pharma–Quick-Step	+ 10"
10	Kristof Vandewalle (BEL)	Omega Pharma–Quick-Step	+ 10"

== Stage 2 ==
19 August 2012 — Pamplona to Viana, 181.4 km (112.7 mi)

The opening road stage of the 2012 Vuelta saw the riders head south from Pamplona, via a loop around Tafalla – where the race's first intermediate sprint point was held – and the first categorised climb, the third-category Alto de la Chapela, before heading towards Viana. In Viana itself, there was an intermediate sprint point on the first passage through the town, before the finish second time around. With most of the 181.4 km (112.7 mi) parcours being flat, it was expected to ultimately result in a sprint finish at the stage end. Three riders – Spanish pairing Javier Aramendia of Caja Rural and Andalucía rider Javier Chacón, along with Mikhail Ignatiev (Team Katusha) – went clear around 6 km (3.7 mi) after the start of the stage, making the early breakaway from the field, and the trio managed to extend their advantage over the main field to around five minutes. Niki Terpstra had also been a part of the breakaway at one point, but as he trailed overnight leader Jonathan Castroviejo of the Movistar Team by just ten seconds, the breakaway were not allowed to gain a substantial advantage at that point. Terpstra ultimately dropped back into the main field to allow the gap to increase.

Between the lead trio, they swept up most of the available points on offer at the two intermediate sprint positions, while Chacón assumed the first blue-and-white polka-dot jersey for the mountains classification but only after Aramendia was assumed to have sprinted irregularly while crossing the summit of the third-category Alto de la Chapela first. Having guaranteed a jersey at the end of the day, Chacón dropped back with around 20 km (12.4 mi) remaining, when the gap to the main field was around a minute; Alberto Contador (Saxo Bank–Tinkoff Bank) took two bonus seconds for third at the intermediate sprint point in Viana, moving level with his main general classification rival Chris Froome, of Team Sky. Ignatiev and Aramendia were brought back several kilometres later, and despite several late attacks, the expected sprint finish materialised where Argos–Shimano sprinter John Degenkolb took his first Grand Tour stage victory, beating Orica–GreenEDGE's Allan Davis and Froome's teammate Ben Swift to the line. Castroviejo maintained his overall lead by finishing with the peloton, although he was not confident of keeping it, while Chacón added the white combination jersey to his mountains lead and Degenkolb took the points lead with his stage win.

Stage 2 result

	Rider	Team	Time
1	John Degenkolb (GER)	Argos–Shimano	4h 38' 40"
2	Allan Davis (AUS)	Orica–GreenEDGE	s.t.
3	Ben Swift (GBR)	Team Sky	s.t.
4	Elia Viviani (ITA)	Liquigas–Cannondale	s.t.
5	Klaas Lodewyck (BEL)	BMC Racing Team	s.t.
6	Vicente Reynès (ESP)	Lotto–Belisol	s.t.
7	Davide Cimolai (ITA)	Lampre–ISD	s.t.
8	Gianni Meersman (BEL)	Lotto–Belisol	s.t.
9	Manuel Antonio Cardoso (POR)	Caja Rural	s.t.
10	Daniele Bennati (ITA)	RadioShack–Nissan	s.t.

General classification after stage 2

	Rider	Team	Time
1	Jonathan Castroviejo (ESP)	Movistar Team	4h 57' 31"
2	Nairo Quintana (COL)	Movistar Team	+ 0"
3	Javier Moreno (ESP)	Movistar Team	+ 0"
4	Alejandro Valverde (ESP)	Movistar Team	+ 0"
5	Beñat Intxausti (ESP)	Movistar Team	+ 0"
6	Juan José Cobo (ESP)	Movistar Team	+ 4"
7	Dennis van Winden (NED)	Rabobank	+ 10"
8	Niki Terpstra (NED)	Omega Pharma–Quick-Step	+ 10"
9	Kevin De Weert (BEL)	Omega Pharma–Quick-Step	+ 10"
10	Alessandro Ballan (ITA)	BMC Racing Team	+ 10"

== Stage 3 ==
20 August 2012 — Faustino V to Eibar–Arrate, 155.3 km (96.5 mi)

Although there were four categorised climbs over the 155.3 km (96.5 mi) parcours, the final climb of the day – the first-category Alto de Arrate – was the key point of the stage. Frequently used in the Tour of the Basque Country stage race held in the spring, the Alto de Arrate climb with a gradient in places at over 11%, crested out with around 2 km (1.2 mi) remaining of the stage, before a false flat to the finish line. With three-time Arrate winner Samuel Sánchez not competing in the Vuelta, Team Katusha's Joaquim Rodríguez – second in Eibar, in 2012 – was regarded as one of the stage favourites along with Movistar Team rider Alejandro Valverde and Alberto Contador of Saxo Bank–Tinkoff Bank.

The day's breakaway was made up of eight riders, who all moved ahead of the main field inside the opening 10 km (6.2 mi) of the stage. The octet managed to establish a lead of almost four-and-a-half minutes, despite one of its members – BMC Racing Team's Philippe Gilbert, still winless for the year – being just ten seconds behind the leader of the general classification, Valverde's teammate Jonathan Castroviejo. At each of the three categorised climbs prior to the finishing climb, Pim Ligthart of Vacansoleil–DCM took maximum points on offer, leading from Gilbert at two of them, while Nico Sijmens (Cofidis) crossed the third climb, the Puerto de Campazar, behind Ligthart and ahead of Gilbert. The lead group started to splinter with around 20 km (12.4 mi), with the peloton's pace being set by the Saxo Bank–Tinkoff Bank and Omega Pharma–Quick-Step squads, bringing the gap under a minute.

The latter team's Niki Terpstra was first to make a move on the Alto de Arrate, but was quickly closed down before he could establish any substantial headway off the front of the peloton. Saxo Bank–Tinkoff Bank maintained their position at the front, setting the pace for Contador, and were joined at the front by Team Sky. Valverde was the first of the favourites to attack from the rapidly diminishing lead group, with Contador jumping onto his wheel with Rodríguez and Team Sky's Chris Froome eventually rejoining their fellow contenders. Contador then launched several more attacks – seven in all – as the lead quartet moved their way up the climb, but each time, the other three riders in the group were able to come back to him. Valverde and Rodríguez contested the sprint for the line, with Valverde taking his sixth career Vuelta stage win in a photo-finish, after Rodríguez free-wheeled in the closing metres; a move that left him furious post-stage. Valverde took the lead in the general, points and combination classifications, while Ligthart took the mountains lead.

Stage 3 result

	Rider	Team	Time
1	Alejandro Valverde (ESP)	Movistar Team	3h 49' 37"
2	Joaquim Rodríguez (ESP)	Team Katusha	s.t.
3	Chris Froome (GBR)	Team Sky	s.t.
4	Alberto Contador (ESP)	Saxo Bank–Tinkoff Bank	s.t.
5	Daniel Moreno (ESP)	Team Katusha	+ 6"
6	Bauke Mollema (NED)	Rabobank	+ 6"
7	Eros Capecchi (ITA)	Liquigas–Cannondale	+ 6"
8	Beñat Intxausti (ESP)	Movistar Team	+ 6"
9	Andrew Talansky (USA)	Garmin–Sharp	+ 6"
10	Robert Gesink (NED)	Rabobank	+ 6"

General classification after stage 3

	Rider	Team	Time
1	Alejandro Valverde (ESP)	Movistar Team	8h 46' 56"
2	Beñat Intxausti (ESP)	Movistar Team	+ 18"
3	Joaquim Rodríguez (ESP)	Team Katusha	+ 19"
4	Chris Froome (GBR)	Team Sky	+ 20"
5	Alberto Contador (ESP)	Saxo Bank–Tinkoff Bank	+ 24"
6	Bauke Mollema (NED)	Rabobank	+ 28"
7	Robert Gesink (NED)	Rabobank	+ 28"
8	Rigoberto Urán (COL)	Team Sky	+ 30"
9	Daniel Moreno (ESP)	Team Katusha	+ 33"
10	Igor Antón (ESP)	Euskaltel–Euskadi	+ 46"

== Stage 4 ==
21 August 2012 — Barakaldo to Estación de Valdezcaray, 160.6 km (99.8 mi)

Fresh from the punchy finish in Eibar the previous day, the race moved out of the Basque Country and headed towards the ski resort at Valdezcaray; the stage itself finished at the base of the resort – coming at 1,540 m (5,050 ft) above sea level – via a first-category climb of 13.4 km (8.3 mi) in length, at an average gradient of 5.2%, although reaching 9% in places at the lower slopes of the climb. The primary breakaway of the stage was formed early in the stage, when a wave of five riders went clear. Simon Clarke (Orica–GreenEDGE) was joined in the breakaway by Omega Pharma–Quick-Step's Tony Martin and Assan Bazayev of Astana, as well as two riders representing UCI Professional Continental Teams; Luis Ángel Maté for Cofidis and Andalucía rider Jesús Rosendo, with the quintet quickly gaining a substantial advantage over the main field, as they were over nine minutes clear after 28 km (17.4 mi), and eventually established a maximum lead of just under 14 minutes.

With the leaders extending their lead to an insurmountable margin, the general classification contenders were looking to avoid any particular trouble during the parcours of 160.6 km (99.8 mi) in length. However, just after the field had passed through the town of Haro, the crosswinds that had set the course of the day played a factor in a crash. Just as Juan Antonio Flecha had accelerated on the front for Team Sky, most of the Movistar Team hit the tarmac, including the race leader Alejandro Valverde. After the stage, Valverde criticised Team Sky and blamed them for the incident. At one point, Valverde's team manager Eusebio Unzué, pulled up alongside the Team Sky car for a discussion with their sporting director Nicolas Portal.

The ramping up of the pace had split the peloton into echelons on the road, with as many as five diagonal lines of riders seconds apart from one another. World time trial champion Martin attacked his companions at the bottom of the final climb, and took Clarke with him, as the other three riders could not follow the higher pace. As it transpired, Clarke had the stronger finish, and ultimately took his first professional victory on the line. Bazayev finished third, while the peloton came in over a minute behind Clarke; Valverde lost almost a minute beyond that, and surrendered the overall lead to Team Katusha's Joaquim Rodríguez, who held a one-second advantage over Flecha's teammate Chris Froome. Clarke assumed the lead of both the points and mountains classifications.

Stage 4 result

	Rider	Team	Time
1	Simon Clarke (AUS)	Orica–GreenEDGE	4h 30' 26"
2	Tony Martin (GER)	Omega Pharma–Quick-Step	+ 2"
3	Assan Bazayev (KAZ)	Astana	+ 22"
4	Marcos García (ESP)	Caja Rural	+ 55"
5	Nicolas Roche (IRL)	Ag2r–La Mondiale	+ 55"
6	Linus Gerdemann (GER)	RadioShack–Nissan	+ 57"
7	Laurens ten Dam (NED)	Rabobank	+ 57"
8	Andrey Zeits (KAZ)	Astana	+ 1' 01"
9	Bauke Mollema (NED)	Rabobank	+ 1' 04"
10	Jan Bakelants (BEL)	RadioShack–Nissan	+ 1' 04"

General classification after stage 4

	Rider	Team	Time
1	Joaquim Rodríguez (ESP)	Team Katusha	13h 18' 45"
2	Chris Froome (GBR)	Team Sky	+ 1"
3	Alberto Contador (ESP)	Saxo Bank–Tinkoff Bank	+ 5"
4	Bauke Mollema (NED)	Rabobank	+ 9"
5	Robert Gesink (NED)	Rabobank	+ 9"
6	Rigoberto Urán (COL)	Team Sky	+ 11"
7	Daniel Moreno (ESP)	Team Katusha	+ 14"
8	Nicolas Roche (IRL)	Ag2r–La Mondiale	+ 24"
9	Alejandro Valverde (ESP)	Movistar Team	+ 36"
10	Laurens ten Dam (NED)	Rabobank	+ 46"

== Stage 5 ==
22 August 2012 — Logroño to Logroño, 168 km (104.4 mi)

Following two consecutive summit finishes, before another one in the succeeding stage of the race, the fifth stage of the race was a circuit race around the city of Logroño in the La Rioja region. Over the 168 km (104.4 mi) itinerary for the stage, a loop of 21 km (13.0 mi) was completed eight times, with intermediate sprint points being held on the Avenida de la Paz, in the city. The sprint points were held 400 m (1,300 ft) prior to the conclusion of the third and fifth laps, although it was widely expected that the stage would end up in a sprint finish. Andalucía rider Javier Chacón broke away from the rest of the field almost from the start of the stage, and managed to get clear without the help of a breakaway companion. The main field decided not to follow him closely to begin with, as he was not a factor in the overall classification; over 26 minutes behind overnight leader Joaquim Rodríguez of Team Katusha.

After a quarter of the stage, Chacón held a maximum lead of almost 12 minutes over the rest of the field, but Argos–Shimano started to lift the pace in the peloton in the long bid to bring back Chacón. With added help from the teammates of Rodríguez, the peloton had reduced Chacón's advantage to around four-and-a-half minutes at the midpoint of the stage. He was ultimately brought back to the main field with just under 30 km (18.6 mi) of the stage remaining. The final lap of the circuit saw many of the sprint trains head towards the front of the group; under the flamme rouge, it was RadioShack–Nissan – for Daniele Bennati – and Gianni Meersman's Lotto–Belisol outfit, that were at the head of proceedings with Argos–Shimano close behind. Bennati launched his sprint first, but with help from teammate Simon Geschke, John Degenkolb followed Bennati for a time before sprinting past him and won his second stage of the race by around half a bike length. Meersman completed the top three of the stage results, as Rodríguez maintained his overall lead.

Stage 5 result

	Rider	Team	Time
1	John Degenkolb (GER)	Argos–Shimano	4h 10' 37"
2	Daniele Bennati (ITA)	RadioShack–Nissan	s.t.
3	Gianni Meersman (BEL)	Lotto–Belisol	s.t.
4	Nacer Bouhanni (FRA)	FDJ–BigMat	s.t.
5	Elia Viviani (ITA)	Liquigas–Cannondale	s.t.
6	Raymond Kreder (NED)	Garmin–Sharp	s.t.
7	Allan Davis (AUS)	Orica–GreenEDGE	s.t.
8	Lloyd Mondory (FRA)	Ag2r–La Mondiale	s.t.
9	Leonardo Duque (COL)	Cofidis	s.t.
10	Pim Ligthart (NED)	Vacansoleil–DCM	s.t.

General classification after stage 5

	Rider	Team	Time
1	Joaquim Rodríguez (ESP)	Team Katusha	17h 29' 22"
2	Chris Froome (GBR)	Team Sky	+ 1"
3	Alberto Contador (ESP)	Saxo Bank–Tinkoff Bank	+ 5"
4	Bauke Mollema (NED)	Rabobank	+ 9"
5	Robert Gesink (NED)	Rabobank	+ 9"
6	Rigoberto Urán (COL)	Team Sky	+ 11"
7	Daniel Moreno (ESP)	Team Katusha	+ 14"
8	Nicolas Roche (IRL)	Ag2r–La Mondiale	+ 24"
9	Alejandro Valverde (ESP)	Movistar Team	+ 36"
10	Laurens ten Dam (NED)	Rabobank	+ 46"

== Stage 6 ==
23 August 2012 — Tarazona to Jaca, 175.4 km (109.0 mi)

The sixth stage of the race was a return to the mountains and the emphasis was shifted away from the sprinters to the general classification contenders, in light of the two punchy, categorised climbs within the final 30 km (18.6 mi) of the day's stage. Following a lengthy descent from the third-category climb of the Puerto del Oroel, the riders had to contend with the Fuerte del Rapitán into Jaca; although relatively short at just 3.8 km (2.4 mi) long, the climb had an average gradient of 5.4%. After the usual manic start to the day's proceedings on the road, it was a five-rider breakaway that was established at around the 10 km (6.2 mi) point of the stage. The riders in question were either Dutch or Belgian; Garmin–Sharp rider Martijn Maaskant, Joost van Leijen of Lotto–Belisol and Orica–GreenEDGE's Pieter Weening representing the former country, and Omega Pharma–Quick-Step's Kristof Vandewalle and Thomas De Gendt (Vacansoleil–DCM) representing the latter.

De Gendt, who was third at May's Giro d'Italia, was the best-placed rider out of the quintet in 60th place overall overnight, but he trailed the leader Joaquim Rodríguez by over seven minutes. Despite this, the lead group was allowed to establish a maximum lead of over four minutes around two-thirds into the stage, before Rodriguez's Team Katusha squad as well as the Movistar Team team in support of their team leader Alejandro Valverde started to bring them back. After van Leijen was dropped with around 25 km (15.5 mi) to go, De Gendt soon set off on his own to attempt a solo bid for victory; ultimately, he was caught before the final climb, after his near 50-second lead was negated. The pace set by the Movistar Team dwindled numbers considerably on the Fuerte del Rapitán before Team Sky moved forward with Columbians Rigoberto Urán and Sergio Henao to protect Chris Froome. After Urán took to the front inside the final kilometre, Froome was first to attack, with only Rodríguez able to respond; Rodríguez himself kicked for the line from 200 m (660 ft) out, and with no response from Froome, he soon moved clear to take his fifth stage win at the Vuelta – having predicted that the climb would make "sparks fly" the previous day – and extended his overall lead to ten seconds over Froome.

Stage 6 result

	Rider	Team	Time
1	Joaquim Rodríguez (ESP)	Team Katusha	4h 35' 22"
2	Chris Froome (GBR)	Team Sky	+ 5"
3	Alejandro Valverde (ESP)	Movistar Team	+ 10"
4	Alberto Contador (ESP)	Saxo Bank–Tinkoff Bank	+ 19"
5	Eros Capecchi (ITA)	Liquigas–Cannondale	+ 19"
6	Rigoberto Urán (COL)	Team Sky	+ 19"
7	Rinaldo Nocentini (ITA)	Ag2r–La Mondiale	+ 25"
8	Mauro Santambrogio (ITA)	BMC Racing Team	+ 28"
9	Nicolas Roche (IRL)	Ag2r–La Mondiale	+ 28"
10	Robert Gesink (NED)	Rabobank	+ 33"

General classification after stage 6

	Rider	Team	Time
1	Joaquim Rodríguez (ESP)	Team Katusha	22h 04' 32"
2	Chris Froome (GBR)	Team Sky	+ 10"
3	Alberto Contador (ESP)	Saxo Bank–Tinkoff Bank	+ 36"
4	Rigoberto Urán (COL)	Team Sky	+ 42"
5	Robert Gesink (NED)	Rabobank	+ 54"
6	Alejandro Valverde (ESP)	Movistar Team	+ 54"
7	Nicolas Roche (IRL)	Ag2r–La Mondiale	+ 1' 04"
8	Bauke Mollema (NED)	Rabobank	+ 1' 12"
9	Daniel Moreno (ESP)	Team Katusha	+ 1' 17"
10	Juan José Cobo (ESP)	Movistar Team	+ 1' 34"

== Stage 7 ==
24 August 2012 — Huesca to Alcañiz–Motorland Aragón, 164.2 km (102.0 mi)

The day's stage was entirely situated within the autonomous community of Aragon, starting in the city of Huesca before heading south towards the outskirts of Alcañiz and the Motorland Aragón circuit, which has hosted several motorsport championship events since being opened in 2009. The finish of the stage itself came on the start-finish straight of the track, having completed almost one lap of the 5.078 km (3.2 mi) circuit. Despite the parcours of the 164.2 km (102.0 mi) stage being undulating, there were no categorised climbs during the stage, with the day's two intermediate sprint points both coming inside the final 50 km (31.1 mi) of the stage. As a result, the stage was again suited towards the sprinters due to the circuit's wide, sweeping bends.

Four riders – Javier Aramendia (Caja Rural), Andalucía's Pablo Lechuga, Bert-Jan Lindeman of Vacansoleil–DCM and Omega Pharma–Quick-Step rider František Raboň – provided the breakaway for the day, moving away from the rest of the field after only 2 km (1.2 mi) of racing. They established a maximum advantage of around five minutes in the opening half of the stage, providing no threat to the overall lead of Joaquim Rodríguez (Team Katusha) as Lechuga was best-placed at over 26 minutes behind. However, Lechuga was the first of the lead quartet to be dropped as the peloton started to bring the leaders back with around 30 km (18.6 mi) remaining. The breakaway was eventually halted halfway towards the finish, and it eventually resulted in a sprint finish at the circuit, despite Team Sky trying to break the peloton, with Chris Froome, Ian Stannard and Ben Swift being part of a six-rider group off the front of the field. Ultimately, points leader John Degenkolb continued his good form in the sprint finishes, taking his third stage victory of the week, after a lead-out from Argos–Shimano teammate Koen de Kort. Rodríguez maintained his overall lead of the race, by ten seconds, over Froome.

Stage 7 result

	Rider	Team	Time
1	John Degenkolb (GER)	Argos–Shimano	3h 48' 30"
2	Elia Viviani (ITA)	Liquigas–Cannondale	s.t.
3	Allan Davis (AUS)	Orica–GreenEDGE	s.t.
4	Nacer Bouhanni (FRA)	FDJ–BigMat	s.t.
5	Daniele Bennati (ITA)	RadioShack–Nissan	s.t.
6	Gianni Meersman (BEL)	Lotto–Belisol	s.t.
7	Dennis van Winden (NED)	Rabobank	s.t.
8	José Joaquín Rojas (ESP)	Movistar Team	s.t.
9	Lloyd Mondory (FRA)	Ag2r–La Mondiale	s.t.
10	Ben Swift (GBR)	Team Sky	s.t.

General classification after stage 7

	Rider	Team	Time
1	Joaquim Rodríguez (ESP)	Team Katusha	25h 53' 04"
2	Chris Froome (GBR)	Team Sky	+ 10"
3	Alberto Contador (ESP)	Saxo Bank–Tinkoff Bank	+ 36"
4	Robert Gesink (NED)	Rabobank	+ 54"
5	Alejandro Valverde (ESP)	Movistar Team	+ 54"
6	Nicolas Roche (IRL)	Ag2r–La Mondiale	+ 1' 04"
7	Bauke Mollema (NED)	Rabobank	+ 1' 12"
8	Daniel Moreno (ESP)	Team Katusha	+ 1' 17"
9	Juan José Cobo (ESP)	Movistar Team	+ 1' 34"
10	Sergio Henao (COL)	Team Sky	+ 1' 39"

== Stage 8 ==
25 August 2012 — Lleida to Andorra–Collada de la Gallina (Andorra), 174.7 km (108.6 mi)

The only stage finish outside of Spain in this year's Vuelta, the eighth stage saw the peloton head north from the start city of Lleida in Catalonia towards the Catalan-speaking microstate of Andorra. After carrying out a loop around the capital Andorra la Vella, via the second intermediate sprint point – the first coming just before the border between Spain and Andorra, in the town of La Seu d'Urgell – and the second-category climb of the Alto de la Comella. After several kilometres of descending, the first-category Collada de la Gallina awaited the riders; the 7.2 km (4.5 mi) climb had an average gradient of 8% – with the gradient reaching 15% in certain places of the climbs – while there were also 18 hairpin bends on the climb, drawing comparisons to Alpe d'Huez, where that climb has 21 such corners.

Helped by a tailwind, the peloton covered over 52 km (32.3 mi) in the first hour of racing, and it was not until nearly halfway into the stage that the breakaway for the day was formed. Six riders – Caja Rural rider Javier Aramendia (for the second day running), Vacansoleil–DCM's Martijn Keizer, Cameron Meyer of Orica–GreenEDGE, Andalucía rider Javier Ramírez, BMC Racing Team's Amaël Moinard and Mickaël Buffaz of Cofidis – went clear and achieved a maximum lead of around nine-and-a-half minutes but hit the bottom of the Collada de la Gallina, with the exception of Keizer and Aramendia, who had been dropped, with a lead of around two-and-a-half minutes over the peloton led by Team Sky. Moinard was dropped in the early stages of the climb, while Meyer launched an attack on his own. Meyer was eventually caught by the top four overall and Daniel Moreno (Team Katusha), who had all broken clear of the main field.

Moreno and Meyer fell away from the group, and it was left to the quartet to battle it out. Froome launched an attack from the front just inside the final kilometre, but was quickly covered by his three Spanish rivals; however, Alberto Contador of Saxo Bank–Tinkoff Bank launched his own counter-attack having brought Froome back. He held an advantage of several seconds in the closing stages, but he started to slow within sight of the finish line. Froome had been left behind by the other two riders in contention – Team Katusha's race leader Joaquim Rodríguez and Alejandro Valverde of the Movistar Team – and the pairing caught Contador out of the final corner, with Valverde taking his second stage victory of the race, just ahead of Rodríguez and Contador. Froome crossed the line fifteen seconds in arrears, which combined with eight bonus seconds gained by Rodríguez at the line, gave Rodríguez a 33-second lead over Froome; although Rodríguez remained pessimistic about his chances overall. Valverde took the blue polka-dot jersey for mountains classification leader, by winning the stage.

Stage 8 result

	Rider	Team	Time
1	Alejandro Valverde (ESP)	Movistar Team	4h 06' 39"
2	Joaquim Rodríguez (ESP)	Team Katusha	s.t.
3	Alberto Contador (ESP)	Saxo Bank–Tinkoff Bank	s.t.
4	Chris Froome (GBR)	Team Sky	+ 15"
5	Daniel Moreno (ESP)	Team Katusha	+ 23"
6	Beñat Intxausti (ESP)	Movistar Team	+ 33"
7	Igor Antón (ESP)	Euskaltel–Euskadi	+ 33"
8	Winner Anacona (COL)	Lampre–ISD	+ 39"
9	Robert Gesink (NED)	Rabobank	+ 39"
10	Przemysław Niemiec (POL)	Lampre–ISD	+ 42"

General classification after stage 8

	Rider	Team	Time
1	Joaquim Rodríguez (ESP)	Team Katusha	29h 59' 35"
2	Chris Froome (GBR)	Team Sky	+ 33"
3	Alberto Contador (ESP)	Saxo Bank–Tinkoff Bank	+ 40"
4	Alejandro Valverde (ESP)	Movistar Team	+ 50"
5	Robert Gesink (NED)	Rabobank	+ 1' 41"
6	Daniel Moreno (ESP)	Team Katusha	+ 1' 48"
7	Nicolas Roche (IRL)	Ag2r–La Mondiale	+ 2' 14"
8	Igor Antón (ESP)	Euskaltel–Euskadi	+ 2' 47"
9	Laurens ten Dam (NED)	Rabobank	+ 2' 58"
10	Bauke Mollema (NED)	Rabobank	+ 3' 07"

== Stage 9 ==
26 August 2012 — Andorra (Andorra) to Barcelona, 196.3 km (122.0 mi)

The final stage before the race's first rest day saw the riders return to Spanish soil, after its finish in Andorra the previous day. The 196.3 km (122.0 mi) parcours was gradually downhill from the start, except for two third-category climbs along the route; the second of which, came within the final 5 km (3.1 mi) of the stage. With the stage finish in Barcelona, the race returned to the city for the first time since 1999, when a strike by riders over stage conditions reduced the fourteenth stage of that year's race by 50 km (31.1 mi). The finish itself came at Montjuïc – near the Estadi Olímpic Lluís Companys – which was used for the last Grand Tour stage to finish in the city, when Thor Hushovd won the sixth stage of the 2009 Tour de France.

Almost immediately after the peloton rolled out of the start, the breakaway was formed by four riders. For the second day in succession, Cofidis rider Mickaël Buffaz was among the leaders, and he was joined by Vacansoleil–DCM rider Bert-Jan Lindeman, Martijn Maaskant of Garmin–Sharp and, for the third time in the Vuelta, Andalucía's Javier Chacón. They managed to gather up a lead of almost five-and-a-half minutes during the early kilometres of the stage before they were gradually brought back by the main field. Despite the best efforts by the leaders to prolong their stay out front, they were caught with around 25 km (15.5 mi) remaining. Chacón's teammate Jesús Rosendo went on an immediate counter-attack, but he too could not stay clear over the field. Rosendo ultimately crashed after being absorbed back into the main field, and had to wait for his front wheel to be changed.

Back at the front, the field remained together on the run into Barcelona, with the teams of the general classification contenders – Team Katusha, Team Sky and Saxo Bank–Tinkoff Bank – heading the field as they did so. Alberto Contador attacked prior to the Alto de Montjuïc, but could not get clear enough for the attack to stick. However, a planned attack by BMC Racing Team's Alessandro Ballan gained more headway, with race leader Joaquim Rodríguez chasing him down. Ballan's teammate Philippe Gilbert set off in chase of Rodríguez, with the two riders joining together prior to the top of the climb. Gilbert and Rodríguez managed to remain off the front of the field by several seconds, and Gilbert took the stage honours for his first victory of the season, ahead of Rodríguez. With eight bonus seconds on the line, Rodríguez put around twenty seconds into his rivals, with his overall lead over Chris Froome increasing to fifty-three seconds, heading into the rest day.

Stage 9 result

	Rider	Team	Time
1	Philippe Gilbert (BEL)	BMC Racing Team	4h 45' 28"
2	Joaquim Rodríguez (ESP)	Team Katusha	s.t.
3	Paolo Tiralongo (ITA)	Astana	+ 7"
4	Tomasz Marczyński (POL)	Vacansoleil–DCM	+ 9"
5	Daniele Bennati (ITA)	RadioShack–Nissan	+ 9"
6	Alejandro Valverde (ESP)	Movistar Team	+ 9"
7	Nacer Bouhanni (FRA)	FDJ–BigMat	+ 9"
8	Gorka Verdugo (ESP)	Euskaltel–Euskadi	+ 12"
9	Gianni Meersman (BEL)	Lotto–Belisol	+ 12"
10	Igor Antón (ESP)	Euskaltel–Euskadi	+ 12"

General classification after stage 9

	Rider	Team	Time
1	Joaquim Rodríguez (ESP)	Team Katusha	34h 44' 55"
2	Chris Froome (GBR)	Team Sky	+ 53"
3	Alberto Contador (ESP)	Saxo Bank–Tinkoff Bank	+ 1' 00"
4	Alejandro Valverde (ESP)	Movistar Team	+ 1' 07"
5	Robert Gesink (NED)	Rabobank	+ 2' 01"
6	Daniel Moreno (ESP)	Team Katusha	+ 2' 08"
7	Nicolas Roche (IRL)	Ag2r–La Mondiale	+ 2' 34"
8	Igor Antón (ESP)	Euskaltel–Euskadi	+ 3' 07"
9	Laurens ten Dam (NED)	Rabobank	+ 3' 18"
10	Bauke Mollema (NED)	Rabobank	+ 3' 27"

== Stage 10 ==
28 August 2012 — Ponteareas to Sanxenxo, 190 km (118.1 mi)

Having transferred from the easternmost point of the race, in Barcelona, the Vuelta recommenced after the rest day, in the town of Ponteareas in the west of Spain – a transfer of some 1,200 km (750 mi) in distance, the third-furthest transfer in the race's history – with a near-flat 190 km (118.1 mi) itinerary. There was only one categorised climb during the stage, coming after only 14.5 km (9.0 mi) at the third-category Alto de San Cosme, with its summit coming 400 m (1,300 ft) above sea level. The riders also had to complete a circuit of around 40 km (24.9 mi) before the finish in Sanxenxo. The flat parcours made it ideal for another sprint finish, as Argos–Shimano's John Degenkolb looked to regain the points classification lead from race leader Joaquim Rodríguez of Team Katusha.

Caja Rural's Javier Aramendia once again took up a position in the breakaway of a stage, and was joined out front by the most combative rider of the 2011 edition of the race, Adrián Palomares, representing the Andalucía team. The duo managed to establish a maximum lead of around seven minutes at one point during the stage, before the rest of the field gradually brought the time gap down. They managed to survive off the front until the finishing circuit, where they were brought back around a quarter of the way around the lap. The sprinters' teams moved forward towards the end of the lap, where Vacansoleil–DCM, Team Sky and Argos–Shimano all looked to set it up for their respective sprinters. Ultimately, it was Degenkolb that was able to out-sprint his rivals – despite having to launch his sprint earlier than he wanted – to take his fourth stage victory of the race, becoming the first rider to do so since countryman André Greipel in 2009. Degenkolb finished ahead of FDJ–BigMat's Nacer Bouhanni and RadioShack–Nissan rider Daniele Bennati.

Stage 10 result

	Rider	Team	Time
1	John Degenkolb (GER)	Argos–Shimano	4h 47' 24"
2	Nacer Bouhanni (FRA)	FDJ–BigMat	s.t.
3	Daniele Bennati (ITA)	RadioShack–Nissan	s.t.
4	Gianni Meersman (BEL)	Lotto–Belisol	s.t.
5	Manuel Antonio Cardoso (POR)	Caja Rural	s.t.
6	Lloyd Mondory (FRA)	Ag2r–La Mondiale	s.t.
7	Pim Ligthart (NED)	Vacansoleil–DCM	s.t.
8	Davide Viganò (ITA)	Lampre–ISD	s.t.
9	Ben Swift (GBR)	Team Sky	s.t.
10	Elia Viviani (ITA)	Liquigas–Cannondale	s.t.

General classification after stage 10

	Rider	Team	Time
1	Joaquim Rodríguez (ESP)	Team Katusha	39h 32' 23"
2	Chris Froome (GBR)	Team Sky	+ 53"
3	Alberto Contador (ESP)	Saxo Bank–Tinkoff Bank	+ 1' 00"
4	Alejandro Valverde (ESP)	Movistar Team	+ 1' 07"
5	Robert Gesink (NED)	Rabobank	+ 2' 01"
6	Daniel Moreno (ESP)	Team Katusha	+ 2' 08"
7	Nicolas Roche (IRL)	Ag2r–La Mondiale	+ 2' 34"
8	Igor Antón (ESP)	Euskaltel–Euskadi	+ 3' 07"
9	Laurens ten Dam (NED)	Rabobank	+ 3' 18"
10	Bauke Mollema (NED)	Rabobank	+ 3' 27"

== Stage 11 ==
29 August 2012 — Cambados to Pontevedra, 39.4 km (24.5 mi), individual time trial (ITT)

The only individual time trial stage of the Vuelta, the halfway point was marked with an itinerary of 39.4 km (24.5 mi), with the parcours split into three distinct sections; the first section was relatively flat all the way from the start in Cambados, to the intermediate time-check at the 13.5 km (8.4 mi) point of the stage, just outside the town of Barrantes. The second consisted of a 10 km (6.2 mi) long, 4.4% average gradient climb of the third-category Alto Monte Castrove, where points for the mountains classification were on offer for the top three riders to that point, before the descent down to Pontevedra. As was customary of time trial stages, the riders set off in reverse order from where they were ranked in the general classification at the end of the previous stage. Thus, Joost van Leijen of Lotto–Belisol, who, in 193rd place – of the 198 riders who started the race – trailed overall leader Joaquim Rodríguez (Team Katusha) by one hour, thirty-eight minutes and fifty-seven seconds, was the first rider to set off on the stage.

Van Leijen was not the first rider to finish the course however, as Rodríguez's teammate Mikhail Ignatiev was the first to do so. Ignatiev, who started three minutes after van Leijen, at one-minute intervals, ultimately recorded a time of 58' 55" for the course, a time which held for around ten minutes until Garmin–Sharp rider Martijn Maaskant lowered the best time by over a minute. Movistar Team's Jonathan Castroviejo was next to hold top spot, beating Maaskant's time by over three minutes as he completed the course in a time of 54' 10". It was not until Cameron Meyer started 45 minutes later for Orica–GreenEDGE that has time was threatened, with the former track world champion eventually recording a time of 53' 53". Meyer's time was good enough to not be beaten by the current world champion Tony Martin (Omega Pharma–Quick-Step), but his countryman Richie Porte did eventually slip underneath that time, moving quickest by just two seconds for Team Sky, before the stage-winning performance was completed by Astana rider Fredrik Kessiakoff. Kessiakoff, the time trial winner at the Tour de Suisse in June, beat Porte's time at the respective time-points, and ultimately beat his time by a minute and a quarter.

Kessiakoff's time of 52' 36" was not breached by anybody else to start the stage, and enabled him to take his second time trial win of the season. In the battle for overall honours, Rodríguez was able to maintain his lead in the general classification standings despite losing time to all of his rivals. Alejandro Valverde (Movistar Team) had been the first of the contenders to start, and he also put in a solid time trial performance with a time of 53' 44", a time that was eventually good enough for fourth on the final stage results. Chris Froome (Team Sky) had been expected to win the stage, but could only record a time of 53' 15"; as a result, he lost second place overall to Saxo Bank–Tinkoff Bank's Alberto Contador, who, apart from Kessiakoff, was the only other rider to record under 53 minutes for the course with a time of 52' 53", 17 seconds down on Kessiakoff. Rodríguez, who thought he would lose his race lead during the stage, managed to hold on by a solitary second after completing the course with the seventh-fastest time of 53' 52", labelling his performance as a "big step forward".

Stage 11 result

	Rider	Team	Time
1	Fredrik Kessiakoff (SWE)	Astana	52' 36"
2	Alberto Contador (ESP)	Saxo Bank–Tinkoff Bank	+ 17"
3	Chris Froome (GBR)	Team Sky	+ 39"
4	Alejandro Valverde (ESP)	Movistar Team	+ 1' 08"
5	Beñat Intxausti (ESP)	Movistar Team	+ 1' 09"
6	Richie Porte (AUS)	Team Sky	+ 1' 15"
7	Joaquim Rodríguez (ESP)	Team Katusha	+ 1' 16"
8	Cameron Meyer (AUS)	Orica–GreenEDGE	+ 1' 17"
9	Andrew Talansky (USA)	Garmin–Sharp	+ 1' 24"
10	Jonathan Castroviejo (ESP)	Movistar Team	+ 1' 34"

General classification after stage 11

	Rider	Team	Time
1	Joaquim Rodríguez (ESP)	Team Katusha	40h 26' 15"
2	Alberto Contador (ESP)	Saxo Bank–Tinkoff Bank	+ 1"
3	Chris Froome (GBR)	Team Sky	+ 16"
4	Alejandro Valverde (ESP)	Movistar Team	+ 59"
5	Robert Gesink (NED)	Rabobank	+ 2' 27"
6	Daniel Moreno (ESP)	Team Katusha	+ 2' 54"
7	Nicolas Roche (IRL)	Ag2r–La Mondiale	+ 3' 39"
8	Andrew Talansky (USA)	Garmin–Sharp	+ 4' 08"
9	Laurens ten Dam (NED)	Rabobank	+ 4' 22"
10	Bauke Mollema (NED)	Rabobank	+ 5' 10"
