= 2012 Vuelta a España, Stage 12 to Stage 21 =

Cycling race stages

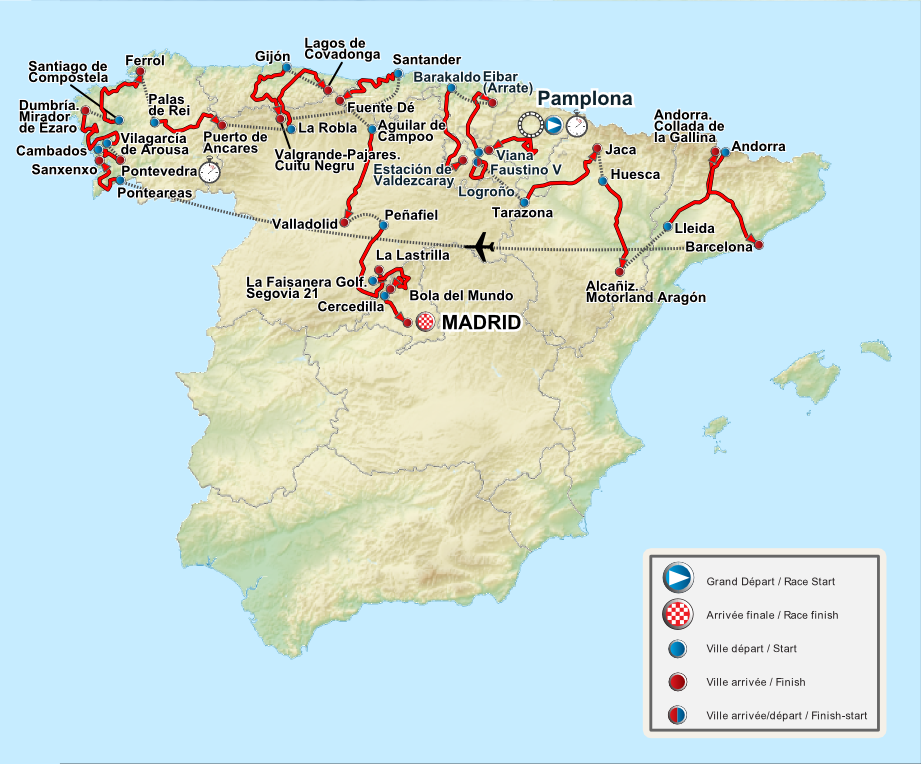
Overview of the stages; red lines represent distances covered in the individual stages, while black dotted lines are the distances covered in transfers between the stages.

Stage 12 of the 2012 Vuelta a España was contested on 30 August, and the race concluded with Stage 21 on 9 September. The second half of the race was situated entirely within Spain; starting with a medium mountain stage from Vilagarcía de Arousa to the Mirador de Ézaro in Dumbría, before four summit finishes and, ultimately, the customary race-concluding ride into Madrid.

Having held the lead of the Vuelta since the fourth stage, Joaquim Rodríguez of Team Katusha maintained his lead into the second half of the race. On the twelfth stage, Rodríguez achieved his second stage victory after out-lasting his rivals for the general classification on the steep climb to Mirador de Ézaro in Dumbría, putting another twelve seconds onto his lead over Saxo Bank–Tinkoff Bank rider Alberto Contador. After the breakaway succeeded the following day, Rodríguez achieved another stage victory on the fourteenth stage to the Puerto de Ancares, where the longer climbs started to come into force in the race as part of three summit finishes in three consecutive stages. Similar to the move at the Mirador de Ézaro, Rodríguez accelerated away from his closest competitor, Contador, extending his race lead to 22 seconds. The following day, all attacks were negated, as the breakaway succeeded again; Antonio Piedra took the first victory for Caja Rural at a Vuelta a España, winning the stage by two minutes.

Rodríguez and Contador remained together for most of the race's queen stage, the first finish at the Cuitu Negru; on gradients approaching 25% in places, Rodríguez gapped Contador by two seconds, with a four-second time bonus ultimately leaving the gap at twenty-eight seconds post-stage and into the second and final rest day of the race. Following the rest day, Contador turned the advantage around with a surprise attack around midway through the stage. He left his rivals for the overall behind, and soloed to the stage victory. Rodríguez struggled during the stage, being dropped by another one of the race contenders, Alejandro Valverde (Movistar Team), and fell to third in the overall standings behind Contador and Valverde. Contador maintained the lead of the race until the end, eventually winning the race for a second time by 1' 16" over Valverde. Rodríguez was third, a further 21 seconds behind, with no other rider within ten minutes of Contador at the end of the race. Valverde took final-day victories in the points and combination sub-classifications, with Rodríguez losing the points competition in Madrid for the second year running after losing out to Bauke Mollema in 2011.

Legend (Note: Jerseys appearing in the table on the left of the page indicate those worn by the cyclist during the particular stage, while those appearing in the table on the right of the page indicate those awarded to the cyclist after the stage.)
A red jersey	Denotes the leader of the General classification	A bluedotted jersey	Denotes the leader of the Mountains classification
A green jersey	Denotes the leader of the Points classification	A white jersey	Denotes the leader of the Combination classification
A jersey with a white rider number on a red background	Denotes the rider designated as the day's most combative	s.t.	A rider that crossed the finish line in the same group as the one receiving the time above him and was therefore credited with the same finishing time.

== Stage 12 ==
30 August 2012 — Vilagarcía de Arousa to Mirador de Ézaro, 190.5 km (118.4 mi)

The second half of the race commenced with a rolling stage starting in the Province of Pontevedra at Vilagarcía de Arousa, before it made its way into the Province of A Coruña and an ultimate summit finish at the Mirador de Ézaro. Despite not being the highest point of the stage, the Mirador de Ézaro provided a stern test for the remaining members of the peloton, as the average gradient of the 1.9 km (1.2 mi) long climb was over 13%, with certain sections of the climb reaching 20%, or higher. As a result of the short and steep climb, Joaquim Rodríguez, the race leader for Team Katusha, was considered as the main favourite for the stage – along with ninth stage winner Philippe Gilbert (BMC Racing Team) – as he looked to restore some part of a race-leading margin nearly wiped out during the previous day's time trial. Mini-attacks set the course of the early running of the stage, with the field remaining as a whole for most of the first two hours of racing after several attacks were closed down within minutes.

It was not until the 75 km (46.6 mi) mark that an attack was allowed to gain substantial ground off the front of the main field. Four riders – Cameron Meyer of Orica–GreenEDGE, Euskaltel–Euskadi's Mikel Astarloza, BMC Racing Team rider Amaël Moinard and Kevin De Weert, representing the Omega Pharma–Quick-Step team – were allowed to freedom to create a lead of over seven minutes during the stage, but were gradually brought back and despite the chasing by the peloton, the lead quartet still held a lead of around half a minute at the bottom of the Mirador de Ézaro. Despite an attack by Astarloza's team-mate Igor Antón, Team Katusha were able to set Rodríguez up for his second stage victory of the race, with Alberto Contador (Saxo Bank–Tinkoff Bank) coming across the line eight seconds behind, having been the last rider to have been dropped by Rodríguez, to limit his deficit to thirteen seconds after time bonuses had been applied.

Stage 12 result

	Rider	Team	Time
1	Joaquim Rodríguez (ESP)	Team Katusha	4h 24' 32"
2	Alberto Contador (ESP)	Saxo Bank–Tinkoff Bank	+ 8"
3	Alejandro Valverde (ESP)	Movistar Team	+ 13"
4	Robert Gesink (NED)	Rabobank	+ 20"
5	Chris Froome (GBR)	Team Sky	+ 23"
6	Daniel Moreno (ESP)	Team Katusha	+ 23"
7	Igor Antón (ESP)	Euskaltel–Euskadi	+ 27"
8	Nicolas Roche (IRL)	Ag2r–La Mondiale	+ 31"
9	Przemysław Niemiec (POL)	Lampre–ISD	+ 33"
10	Gorka Verdugo (ESP)	Euskaltel–Euskadi	+ 36"

General classification after stage 12

	Rider	Team	Time
1	Joaquim Rodríguez (ESP)	Team Katusha	44h 50' 35"
2	Alberto Contador (ESP)	Saxo Bank–Tinkoff Bank	+ 13"
3	Chris Froome (GBR)	Team Sky	+ 51"
4	Alejandro Valverde (ESP)	Movistar Team	+ 1' 20"
5	Robert Gesink (NED)	Rabobank	+ 2' 59"
6	Daniel Moreno (ESP)	Team Katusha	+ 3' 29"
7	Nicolas Roche (IRL)	Ag2r–La Mondiale	+ 4' 22"
8	Andrew Talansky (USA)	Garmin–Sharp	+ 5' 17"
9	Laurens ten Dam (NED)	Rabobank	+ 5' 18"
10	Bauke Mollema (NED)	Rabobank	+ 6' 01"

== Stage 13 ==
31 August 2012 — Santiago de Compostela to Ferrol, 172.8 km (107.4 mi)

Despite its 172.8 km (107.4 mi) parcours being lumpy and undulating, the thirteenth stage was categorised as a stage for one of the sprinters to achieve a victory on, and potentially their last chance of a stage win until the following week as up until the rest day, the following three stages would all have summit finishes. There were two intermediate sprint points during the stages, offering points to the points classification and bonus seconds towards the general classification, coming in A Laracha at 72.5 km (45.0 mi), and in Catabois 5 km (3.1 mi) from the finish in Ferrol. Ferrol was hosting the race for the first time since 1993, when Djamolidine Abdoujaparov won the penultimate stage of that year's race. Much like the previous day's stage, mini-attacks set the course of the early running, with the field remaining as a whole for most of the first hour of racing after several attacks were closed down within minutes.

However, just after the 40 km (24.9 mi) mark, a group did form and was allowed to make a gap off the front of the field. Seven riders representing six teams – Orica–GreenEDGE were the only squad to have two riders in the group – and achieved a lead of four minutes during the stage, with the peloton unwilling to let the advantage to anything larger. The gap was brought down at a quicker pace than normal, with Argos–Shimano and Lotto–Belisol willing to bring it back for their sprinters John Degenkolb and Gianni Meersman respectively. However, the peloton never caught the breakaway during the stage, and after several moves with 5 km (3.1 mi) to go, BMC Racing Team's Steve Cummings made a solo bid for victory with 4 km (2.5 mi) remaining, and remained clear until the end to take his first Grand Tour stage win, and his first victory for the team. Orica–GreenEDGE's Cameron Meyer bested Juan Antonio Flecha (Team Sky) for second place, four seconds behind Cummings, with the peloton led home by Degenkolb finished forty seconds behind Cummings.

Stage 13 result

	Rider	Team	Time
1	Steve Cummings (GBR)	BMC Racing Team	4h 05' 02"
2	Cameron Meyer (AUS)	Orica–GreenEDGE	+ 4"
3	Juan Antonio Flecha (ESP)	Team Sky	+ 4"
4	Simon Clarke (AUS)	Orica–GreenEDGE	+ 14"
5	Linus Gerdemann (GER)	RadioShack–Nissan	+ 14"
6	Thomas De Gendt (BEL)	Vacansoleil–DCM	+ 14"
7	John Degenkolb (GER)	Argos–Shimano	+ 40"
8	Allan Davis (AUS)	Orica–GreenEDGE	+ 40"
9	Ben Swift (GBR)	Team Sky	+ 40"
10	Lloyd Mondory (FRA)	Ag2r–La Mondiale	+ 40"

General classification after stage 13

	Rider	Team	Time
1	Joaquim Rodríguez (ESP)	Team Katusha	48h 56' 17"
2	Alberto Contador (ESP)	Saxo Bank–Tinkoff Bank	+ 13"
3	Chris Froome (GBR)	Team Sky	+ 51"
4	Alejandro Valverde (ESP)	Movistar Team	+ 1' 20"
5	Robert Gesink (NED)	Rabobank	+ 2' 59"
6	Daniel Moreno (ESP)	Team Katusha	+ 3' 29"
7	Nicolas Roche (IRL)	Ag2r–La Mondiale	+ 4' 22"
8	Andrew Talansky (USA)	Garmin–Sharp	+ 5' 17"
9	Laurens ten Dam (NED)	Rabobank	+ 5' 18"
10	Bauke Mollema (NED)	Rabobank	+ 6' 01"

== Stage 14 ==
1 September 2012 — Palas de Rei to Puerto de Ancares, 149.2 km (92.7 mi)

The race returned to the mountains for the first of three consecutive summit finishes, that were expected to alter the general classification standings. Instead of the short, punchy climbs that had featured in the race prior to the fourteenth stage, longer climbs were included in the stage's 149.2 km (92.7 mi) itinerary. There were five categorised climbs, with the steeper climbs coming towards the end of the stage; inside the final 35 km (21.7 mi) of the stage were two first-category ascents of the Alto Folgueiras de Aigas – averaging 6.7% for its 9.7 km (6.0 mi) length – and the final 9.5 km (5.9 mi) climb of the Puerto de Ancares which averaged 8.1%, but reaching almost 13% in places, en route to the summit at 1,470 m (4,820 ft) above sea level. The climb also contained a downhill section of around a kilometre in length, just after halfway up the climb.

A four-rider move initially got clear in the opening kilometres of the stage, but they were brought back before 20 km (12.4 mi) of the parcours had been completed. After that, a larger group consisting of sixteen riders, including the four-time defending mountains classification winner David Moncoutié (Cofidis) and fourth stage winner Simon Clarke of Orica–GreenEDGE advanced forward. With members of their respective teams in the breakaway as well, Joaquim Rodríguez's Team Katusha squad and the Movistar Team of Alejandro Valverde, sat back in the peloton and allowed Saxo Bank–Tinkoff Bank and Team Sky to control the pace for their respective protected riders Alberto Contador and Chris Froome. The leaders held a lead of over three minutes at one point, with the break splitting apart on the Alto Folgueiras de Aigas, and on the descent, Alberto Losada – Rodríguez's team-mate in the break – ventured off the front on his own. The peloton had reduced the gap to two minutes by this point, and were continuing to close the gap gradually as they reached the bottom of the final climb of the stage.

Saxo Bank–Tinkoff Bank maintained station at the front of the peloton, with Contador being paced by three of his team-mates, and his rivals Rodríguez and Valverde were in close order to him. With the pace being accelerated, the peloton was being reduced in numbers, with only the race contenders remaining after a time. Froome cracked on the climb at one point, but managed to recover sufficiently to rejoin the leaders' group – having caught and passed Losada – before eventually falling off the back again, eventually losing 50 seconds, falling to 1' 41 behind, after time bonuses were applied. Contador launched an attack with 1.9 km (1.2 mi) to go, and nobody followed immediately; however, Rodríguez eventually set off in pursuit of Contador, catching him with around a kilometre remaining. Contador made one last bid for victory, but Rodríguez had enough to combat the move, and eventually accelerated away from him and won his third stage of the race, gapping Contador by five seconds, and added nine seconds to his overall lead.

Stage 14 result

	Rider	Team	Time
1	Joaquim Rodríguez (ESP)	Team Katusha	4h 10' 28"
2	Alberto Contador (ESP)	Saxo Bank–Tinkoff Bank	+ 5"
3	Alejandro Valverde (ESP)	Movistar Team	+ 13"
4	Daniel Moreno (ESP)	Team Katusha	+ 35"
5	Chris Froome (GBR)	Team Sky	+ 38"
6	Andrew Talansky (USA)	Garmin–Sharp	+ 44"
7	Igor Antón (ESP)	Euskaltel–Euskadi	+ 56"
8	Laurens ten Dam (NED)	Rabobank	+ 1' 04"
9	Tomasz Marczyński (POL)	Vacansoleil–DCM	+ 1' 13"
10	Nicolas Roche (IRL)	Ag2r–La Mondiale	+ 1' 17"

General classification after stage 14

	Rider	Team	Time
1	Joaquim Rodríguez (ESP)	Team Katusha	53h 06' 33"
2	Alberto Contador (ESP)	Saxo Bank–Tinkoff Bank	+ 22"
3	Chris Froome (GBR)	Team Sky	+ 1' 41"
4	Alejandro Valverde (ESP)	Movistar Team	+ 1' 41"
5	Daniel Moreno (ESP)	Team Katusha	+ 4' 16"
6	Robert Gesink (NED)	Rabobank	+ 5' 07"
7	Nicolas Roche (IRL)	Ag2r–La Mondiale	+ 5' 51"
8	Andrew Talansky (USA)	Garmin–Sharp	+ 6' 13"
9	Laurens ten Dam (NED)	Rabobank	+ 6' 34"
10	Igor Antón (ESP)	Euskaltel–Euskadi	+ 7' 16"

== Stage 15 ==
2 September 2012 — La Robla to Lagos de Covadonga, 186.5 km (115.9 mi)

For the second of the three consecutive summit finishes, the riders had to negotiate two categorised climbs – as well as the unclassified Puerto de Pajares – before the final 13.5 km (8.4 mi) climb, categorised as a climb of "Categoria Especial", to Lagos de Covadonga. Although the final climb was less steep in gradient compared to the climb before it, the Alto del Mirador del Fito – 7% compared to the latter's 8.3% – it reached 15% in places. As well as that, there were two sections of downhill – each of around 1 km (0.6 mi) in length – in the final 3 km (1.9 mi) of the climb, before ramping up again for the finish. In the early kilometres of the stage, a group of nineteen riders formed the early hallmarks of a breakaway group, before it was eventually established with ten riders in the group, as the peloton negotiated the windy conditions of the stage.

The lead group quickly built a lead then continually went up as the stage wore on, eventually reaching a maximum of around fifteen minutes on the Alto del Mirador del Fito; despite this lead, none of the ten riders were going to make any impact on the general classification as the best-placed rider in the group – Andrey Kashechkin of the Astana team – was over 22 minutes down on the leader Joaquim Rodríguez of Team Katusha. Kashechkin tried to launch the first attack on the climb to Covadonga, but was brought back by Movistar Team's Pablo Lastras; a second move by Caja Rural rider Antonio Piedra was more successful, and he continually pulled away from his breakaway companions, eventually winning the stage – his team's first at the Vuelta – by over two minutes. The remainder of the lead ten came to the line in individual groups, while the race leaders Rodríguez, Alberto Contador of Saxo Bank–Tinkoff Bank and Lastras' team-mate Alejandro Valverde were over nine minutes in arrears. Valverde moved up to third overall, as Team Sky's Chris Froome lost 35 seconds to the lead trio.

Stage 15 result

	Rider	Team	Time
1	Antonio Piedra (ESP)	Caja Rural	5h 01' 23"
2	Rubén Pérez (ESP)	Euskaltel–Euskadi	+ 2' 02"
3	Lloyd Mondory (FRA)	Ag2r–La Mondiale	+ 2' 02"
4	David de la Fuente (ESP)	Caja Rural	+ 2' 02"
5	Pablo Lastras (ESP)	Movistar Team	+ 2' 07"
6	Simon Geschke (GER)	Argos–Shimano	+ 2' 12"
7	Kevin Seeldraeyers (BEL)	Astana	+ 2' 25"
8	Andrey Kashechkin (KAZ)	Astana	+ 3' 35"
9	Vicente Reynès (ESP)	Lotto–Belisol	+ 3' 49"
10	Sergey Lagutin (UZB)	Vacansoleil–DCM	+ 6' 45"

General classification after stage 15

	Rider	Team	Time
1	Joaquim Rodríguez (ESP)	Team Katusha	58h 17' 21"
2	Alberto Contador (ESP)	Saxo Bank–Tinkoff Bank	+ 22"
3	Alejandro Valverde (ESP)	Movistar Team	+ 1' 41"
4	Chris Froome (GBR)	Team Sky	+ 2' 16"
5	Daniel Moreno (ESP)	Team Katusha	+ 4' 51"
6	Robert Gesink (NED)	Rabobank	+ 5' 42"
7	Andrew Talansky (USA)	Garmin–Sharp	+ 6' 48"
8	Laurens ten Dam (NED)	Rabobank	+ 7' 17"
9	Nicolas Roche (IRL)	Ag2r–La Mondiale	+ 7' 21"
10	Igor Antón (ESP)	Euskaltel–Euskadi	+ 7' 39"

== Stage 16 ==
3 September 2012 — Gijón to Valgrande-Pajares–Cuitu Negru, 183.5 km (114.0 mi)

The last stage before the second and final rest day of the race, the sixteenth stage of the race was set up as the toughest day of climbing in the entire race, and as a result, was deemed the queen stage of the race. During its 183.5 km (114.0 mi) parcours, there were three categorised climbs and a fourth, to the finish, at Cuitu Negru; the climbs got harder as the stage wore on, with a third-category ascent of the Alto de la Cabruñana first, followed by the first-category climbs of the Puerto de San Lorenzo (8.5% gradient) and the Alto de la Cobertoria, a climb with an average gradient of 8.6%. The climb to Valgrande-Pajares and beyond to Cuitu Negru – a "Categoria Especial" climb just like the previous day's finish at Lagos de Covadonga – averaged 6.9% over its 19.4 km (12.1 mi), but was much steeper in the final few kilometres, reaching almost 25% in places. Unlike previous years, the stage finished on a newly repaved section of road, just for the race, rather than finishing in Valgrande-Pajares.

Mini-attacks set the course of the early running of the stage, with the field remaining as a whole for most of the first hour of racing after several attacks were closed down within minutes. It was not until the descent of the first climb of the day, the Alto de la Cabruñana, that an attacking move was allowed to be established; the riders that instigated it, were Thomas De Gendt of Vacansoleil–DCM – the winner of the queen stage at May's Giro d'Italia, at the Stelvio Pass – and Omega Pharma–Quick-Step rider Dario Cataldo. De Gendt and Cataldo quickly gained a substantial advantage over the rest of the field, picking up a lead of almost fourteen-and-a-half minutes while ascending the day's second climb at the Puerto de San Lorenzo. as the peloton negotiated the windy conditions of the stage. Behind, Orica–GreenEDGE's Simon Clarke kept a hold of his mountains classification lead, by accelerating out of the peloton to take the points on offer for third at the summit of the climb. The lead pairing reached the bottom of the final climb with a lead approaching eight minutes, with the peloton being led by Euskaltel–Euskadi, who were looking to protect Igor Antón on the climb.

Saxo Bank–Tinkoff Bank injected some pace into the group, and managed to split the group apart with ease before Nairo Quintana took to the front for the Movistar Team. Alberto Contador (Saxo Bank–Tinkoff Bank) took up the pace from his team-mates and formed a group with Quintana, his team-mate Alejandro Valverde and the race leader Joaquim Rodríguez of Team Katusha. Contador and Rodríguez rode tactically up the climb, and eventually managed to rid themselves of both Valverde and Quintana. However, their battles were only good enough for the places from third to sixth, as Cataldo and De Gendt stayed away from the field by over two-and-a-half minutes. Cataldo won the stage, as De Gendt ultimately cracked on the final climb, and gapped him by seven seconds to take his first Grand Tour stage win. Rodríguez extended his overall lead to 28 seconds over Contador, after gaining the third-place time bonus at the finish.

Stage 16 result

	Rider	Team	Time
1	Dario Cataldo (ITA)	Omega Pharma–Quick-Step	5h 18' 28"
2	Thomas De Gendt (BEL)	Vacansoleil–DCM	+ 7"
3	Joaquim Rodríguez (ESP)	Team Katusha	+ 2' 39"
4	Alberto Contador (ESP)	Saxo Bank–Tinkoff Bank	+ 2' 41"
5	Alejandro Valverde (ESP)	Movistar Team	+ 2' 58"
6	Nairo Quintana (COL)	Movistar Team	+ 3' 24"
7	Igor Antón (ESP)	Euskaltel–Euskadi	+ 4' 07"
8	Andrew Talansky (USA)	Garmin–Sharp	+ 4' 15"
9	Laurens ten Dam (NED)	Rabobank	+ 4' 18"
10	Robert Gesink (NED)	Rabobank	+ 4' 21"

General classification after stage 16

	Rider	Team	Time
1	Joaquim Rodríguez (ESP)	Team Katusha	63h 38' 24"
2	Alberto Contador (ESP)	Saxo Bank–Tinkoff Bank	+ 28"
3	Alejandro Valverde (ESP)	Movistar Team	+ 2' 04"
4	Chris Froome (GBR)	Team Sky	+ 4' 52"
5	Daniel Moreno (ESP)	Team Katusha	+ 6' 58"
6	Robert Gesink (NED)	Rabobank	+ 7' 28"
7	Andrew Talansky (USA)	Garmin–Sharp	+ 8' 28"
8	Laurens ten Dam (NED)	Rabobank	+ 9' 00"
9	Igor Antón (ESP)	Euskaltel–Euskadi	+ 9' 11"
10	Nicolas Roche (IRL)	Ag2r–La Mondiale	+ 11' 44"

== Stage 17 ==
5 September 2012 — Santander to Fuente Dé, 187.3 km (116.4 mi)

The first stage after the second and final rest day, the seventeenth stage was the second last to have an uphill finish of some form; on this occasion, it was a 17.3 km (10.7 mi) long, second-category climb to Fuente Dé, but was not excessively steep at an average gradient of 3.9%. Prior to that, there were two other categorised climbs during the stage – both in the second half of the stage – with the third-category Collado de Ozalba and the second-category Collado La Hoz also on the itinerary for the stage, 187.3 km (116.4 mi) in length. The stage was ideally suited for rouleurs and not the overall contenders, who would be looking at the penultimate-day stage to the summit finish at Bola del Mundo, as their only remaining attempt to gain time before the finish the next day, in Madrid.

Mini-attacks set the course of the early running of the stage, with the field remaining as a whole for most of the first two hours of racing after several attacks were closed down within minutes. At one point, the overall leaders were in two separate groups with Alberto Contador (Saxo Bank–Tinkoff Bank) and Movistar Team's Alejandro Valverde both in the group ahead of Joaquim Rodríguez before Rodríguez's Team Katusha squad closed the gap. Eleven riders representing eleven different teams eventually formed the day's breakaway after 80 km (49.7 mi), with team-mates of both Contador and Valverde in the group. Their lead never hit much more than three minutes, before splitting on the Collado de Ozalba, and FDJ–BigMat rider Arnold Jeannesson moved up from the peloton to join the leaders. A chase group formed on the descent from the climb, with three of Contador's team-mates among them. With the gap at 1' 14" to the leaders at the foot of the Collado La Hoz, Contador attacked out of the peloton.

Rodríguez and Valverde tried to chase him, but Contador made it up to the lead group before the top of the climb. His team-mates helped push the gap up on the roads, while Rodríguez was struggling to react to the pace and only had Alberto Losada for support in the chasing group. Contador attacked again just before the intermediate sprint point at Potes, and only his former team-mate Paolo Tiralongo (Astana) was able to follow him. They held a two-minute gap over their closest rivals; Rodríguez was dropped on the lower slopes of the climb, as he was unable to follow Valverde, while Contador had gone solo off the front with around 13.5 km (8.4 mi) remaining. With help from team-mates Nairo Quintana and Beñat Intxausti, Valverde cut the advantage to Contador on the climb, but could not catch him. Contador eventually took his first victory since returning from suspension, six seconds ahead of a group containing Valverde, Sergio Henao of Team Sky and Euskaltel–Euskadi's Gorka Verdugo. Rodríguez came across the line tenth, 2' 38" in arrears, dropping to third overall behind new leader Contador and Valverde, who moved up to second.

Stage 17 result

	Rider	Team	Time
1	Alberto Contador (ESP)	Saxo Bank–Tinkoff Bank	4h 29' 20"
2	Alejandro Valverde (ESP)	Movistar Team	+ 6"
3	Sergio Henao (COL)	Team Sky	+ 6"
4	Gorka Verdugo (ESP)	Euskaltel–Euskadi	+ 6"
5	Rinaldo Nocentini (ITA)	Ag2r–La Mondiale	+ 19"
6	Jan Bakelants (BEL)	RadioShack–Nissan	+ 55"
7	Beñat Intxausti (ESP)	Movistar Team	+ 1' 13"
8	Alexandre Geniez (FRA)	Argos–Shimano	+ 1' 40"
9	Paolo Tiralongo (ITA)	Astana	+ 2' 13"
10	Joaquim Rodríguez (ESP)	Team Katusha	+ 2' 38"

General classification after stage 17

	Rider	Team	Time
1	Alberto Contador (ESP)	Saxo Bank–Tinkoff Bank	68h 07' 54"
2	Alejandro Valverde (ESP)	Movistar Team	+ 1' 52"
3	Joaquim Rodríguez (ESP)	Team Katusha	+ 2' 28"
4	Chris Froome (GBR)	Team Sky	+ 9' 40"
5	Daniel Moreno (ESP)	Team Katusha	+ 11' 36"
6	Robert Gesink (NED)	Rabobank	+ 12' 06"
7	Laurens ten Dam (NED)	Rabobank	+ 12' 55"
8	Andrew Talansky (USA)	Garmin–Sharp	+ 13' 06"
9	Igor Antón (ESP)	Euskaltel–Euskadi	+ 13' 49"
10	Beñat Intxausti (ESP)	Movistar Team	+ 14' 10"

== Stage 18 ==
6 September 2012 — Aguilar de Campoo to Valladolid, 204.5 km (127.1 mi)

The longest stage of the 2012 Vuelta a España, at 204.5 km (127.1 mi), was a relatively flat affair with no categorised climbs during the stage, meaning that Orica–GreenEDGE's Simon Clarke would keep a hold of the blue polka-dot jersey as the mountains classification leader. A finishing circuit of about 38 km (23.6 mi) in length around Valladolid was also utilised, with two intermediate sprint points – in Valladolid itself, just before the first passage through the finish line, and 6.5 km (4.0 mi) before the finish in Zaratán – before an expected sprint finish. Valladolid was hosting the Vuelta for the first time since the 2008 edition of the race, when Quick-Step rider Wouter Weylandt won the seventeenth stage in a sprint finish.

Unlike recent days, the breakaway was formed immediately after the start of the stage. Cofidis rider Luis Ángel Maté, Team Katusha's Gatis Smukulis and Martijn Keizer of Vacansoleil–DCM attacked in the opening metres, and were later joined by Brent Bookwalter (BMC Racing Team) and Andalucía's Gustavo César; none of the five riders were any threat in the general classification, as Maté was the best-placed of the quintet in 50th place overnight. They managed to achieve an advantage of over five minutes at one point during the stage, but they were all brought back inside of 20 km (12.4 mi) remaining in the stage. The field remained together until the finish, where Team Sky and Liquigas–Cannondale were holding station on the front. British national champion Ian Stannard tried to lead it out for team-mate Ben Swift, but Daniele Bennati (RadioShack–Nissan) made up ground on Swift, and ultimately edged him out at the finish line by inches for his sixth Vuelta stage victory. Bennati later dedicated his first victory in almost a year to former team-mate Weylandt, who was killed during the 2011 Giro d'Italia.

Stage 18 result

	Rider	Team	Time
1	Daniele Bennati (ITA)	RadioShack–Nissan	4h 17' 17"
2	Ben Swift (GBR)	Team Sky	s.t.
3	Allan Davis (AUS)	Orica–GreenEDGE	s.t.
4	Lloyd Mondory (FRA)	Ag2r–La Mondiale	s.t.
5	John Degenkolb (GER)	Argos–Shimano	s.t.
6	Davide Viganò (ITA)	Lampre–ISD	s.t.
7	Matti Breschel (DEN)	Rabobank	s.t.
8	Koen de Kort (NED)	Argos–Shimano	s.t.
9	Mitchell Docker (AUS)	Orica–GreenEDGE	s.t.
10	Grégory Rast (SUI)	RadioShack–Nissan	+ 6"

General classification after stage 18

	Rider	Team	Time
1	Alberto Contador (ESP)	Saxo Bank–Tinkoff Bank	72h 25' 21"
2	Alejandro Valverde (ESP)	Movistar Team	+ 1' 52"
3	Joaquim Rodríguez (ESP)	Team Katusha	+ 2' 28"
4	Chris Froome (GBR)	Team Sky	+ 9' 40"
5	Daniel Moreno (ESP)	Team Katusha	+ 11' 36"
6	Robert Gesink (NED)	Rabobank	+ 12' 02"
7	Laurens ten Dam (NED)	Rabobank	+ 12' 55"
8	Andrew Talansky (USA)	Garmin–Sharp	+ 13' 06"
9	Igor Antón (ESP)	Euskaltel–Euskadi	+ 13' 49"
10	Beñat Intxausti (ESP)	Movistar Team	+ 14' 10"

== Stage 19 ==
7 September 2012 — Peñafiel to La Lastrilla, 178.4 km (110.9 mi)

Much like the previous day's stage, there were no categorised climbs during the day and although more undulating than the eighteenth stage, it was still expected to potentially bring about a sprint finish at the end; however, an uphill finish in La Lastrilla made it equally capable of producing a result that would favour some of the puncheurs in the race, like Philippe Gilbert (BMC Racing Team) or Team Katusha's former race leader Joaquim Rodríguez, or even a breakaway to succeed on a rare occasion. Almost from the start, two of the wildcard teams had riders go out of the peloton and attack off the front, as Andalucía's José Vicente Toribio and Caja Rural rider Aitor Galdós initiated the breakaway, quickly mustering a healthy advantage. The duo's advantage went up at a rapid pace, reaching its maximum of over ten minutes less than a quarter into the stage. Several teams took up station on the front of the main field; some to bring back the gap for the sprinters, while others to set one up for their puncheurs.

Rain started to fall at the halfway point of the stage, but the gap between the leaders and the pack continued to gradually fall until they were eventually caught with 28 km (17.4 mi) remaining. An accelerated pace by the Movistar Team helped to split the peloton in Navas de Riofrío, with Valverde and Rodríguez both eventually taking bonus seconds at the intermediate sprint point in Hontoria. Several late-race attacks came and went, before Gilbert's stage-winning attack out of the peloton in the closing kilometre. He held on to his second victory of the race ahead of Valverde, Daniel Moreno (Team Katusha) and Rodríguez. The rest of the field were led in three seconds later by Lotto–Belisol's Gianni Meersman; among the group was race leader Alberto Contador (Saxo Bank–Tinkoff Bank), who lost 17 seconds on the day to Valverde, but remained 1' 35" clear overnight in the general classification.

Stage 19 result

	Rider	Team	Time
1	Philippe Gilbert (BEL)	BMC Racing Team	4h 56' 25"
2	Alejandro Valverde (ESP)	Movistar Team	s.t.
3	Daniel Moreno (ESP)	Team Katusha	s.t.
4	Joaquim Rodríguez (ESP)	Team Katusha	s.t.
5	Gianni Meersman (BEL)	Lotto–Belisol	+ 3"
6	Bauke Mollema (NED)	Rabobank	+ 3"
7	Jan Bakelants (BEL)	RadioShack–Nissan	+ 3"
8	Ben Swift (GBR)	Team Sky	+ 3"
9	Rinaldo Nocentini (ITA)	Ag2r–La Mondiale	+ 3"
10	Sergio Henao (COL)	Team Sky	+ 3"

General classification after stage 19

	Rider	Team	Time
1	Alberto Contador (ESP)	Saxo Bank–Tinkoff Bank	77h 21' 49"
2	Alejandro Valverde (ESP)	Movistar Team	+ 1' 35"
3	Joaquim Rodríguez (ESP)	Team Katusha	+ 2' 21"
4	Chris Froome (GBR)	Team Sky	+ 9' 48"
5	Daniel Moreno (ESP)	Team Katusha	+ 11' 29"
6	Robert Gesink (NED)	Rabobank	+ 12' 00"
7	Laurens ten Dam (NED)	Rabobank	+ 12' 58"
8	Andrew Talansky (USA)	Garmin–Sharp	+ 13' 09"
9	Igor Antón (ESP)	Euskaltel–Euskadi	+ 13' 52"
10	Beñat Intxausti (ESP)	Movistar Team	+ 15' 13"

== Stage 20 ==
8 September 2012 — La Faisanera Golf to Bola del Mundo, 170.7 km (106.1 mi)

The penultimate stage of the Vuelta was seen as the final chance for the riders to take substantial amounts of time in the race, with the final stage being the customary ride into Madrid. The parcours of 170.7 km (106.1 mi) contained no fewer than five categorised climbs, all rated as a second-category climb or higher, with the summit finish – the tenth of the race – to Bola del Mundo being the highest-categorised of the five, as a "Categoria Especial"; the Bola del Mundo was also the highest point of the race, with the stage winner receiving the Cima Alberto Fernández award. The peloton climbed up to a height of 2,247 metres (7,372 ft) above sea level, via an 11.4 km (7.1 mi) long climb at an average gradient of 8.6%. The Bola decided the race for overall honours on its previous appearance in the race – in 2010 – as Vincenzo Nibali shadowed Ezequiel Mosquera up the climb, therefore winning the race by 41 seconds from Mosquera; Mosquera was later stripped of his results in late 2011.

A group of twenty riders formed the day's breakaway, representing sixteen teams with Ag2r–La Mondiale, Team Katusha, Astana and Omega Pharma–Quick-Step the only squads to have multiple representation in the group. Also among the group was the leader of the mountains classification, Simon Clarke (Orica–GreenEDGE), who was looking to all but guarantee winning the blue polka-dot jersey. Indeed, Clarke took maximum points at the first three climbs during the stage, as the breakaway held a lead of around eight minutes – having reached a maximum of over ten minutes at one point – over the main field. The leaders remained five minutes clear of the peloton as they hit the Bola del Mundo, with the pack being led by Euskaltel–Euskadi, who had Romain Sicard in the lead group. The lead group started to splinter on the climb itself, with six riders going clear in the early stages, before three riders – Team Sky's Richie Porte, Omega Pharma–Quick-Step rider Kevin De Weert and former Vuelta overall winner Denis Menchov of Team Katusha – established themselves with the accelerated pace.

In the peloton, Euskaltel–Euskadi's Igor Antón initially attacked without chase, before Alejandro Valverde (Movistar Team) forced an attack on his rivals, trying to get clear before he was closed down. De Weert was dropped by his two lead companions, while the overall leaders had managed to break out into a group of their own with Valverde, Alberto Contador (Saxo Bank–Tinkoff Bank) and Joaquim Rodríguez being paced by Rodríguez's Team Katusha's team-mate Daniel Moreno. Their team-mate Menchov won the stage – Team Katusha's fourth of the race – as he dropped Porte in the closing metres; six other members of the breakaway also crossed the line before the race contenders. Rodríguez was ninth on the stage, taking 25 seconds on Valverde – who was tenth – and he claimed back 44 seconds on Contador, who finished twelfth. In the general classification, Contador maintained his race lead, by a reduced margin of 1' 16", over Valverde, with Rodríguez another 21 seconds in arrears.

Stage 20 result

	Rider	Team	Time
1	Denis Menchov (RUS)	Team Katusha	4h 48' 48"
2	Richie Porte (AUS)	Team Sky	+ 17"
3	Kevin De Weert (BEL)	Omega Pharma–Quick-Step	+ 42"
4	Fredrik Kessiakoff (SWE)	Astana	+ 1' 16"
5	Romain Sicard (FRA)	Euskaltel–Euskadi	+ 1' 39"
6	Eros Capecchi (ITA)	Liquigas–Cannondale	+ 2' 30"
7	Maxime Bouet (FRA)	Ag2r–La Mondiale	+ 2' 39"
8	Simon Geschke (GER)	Argos–Shimano	+ 3' 14"
9	Joaquim Rodríguez (ESP)	Team Katusha	+ 3' 31"
10	Alejandro Valverde (ESP)	Movistar Team	+ 3' 56"

General classification after stage 20

	Rider	Team	Time
1	Alberto Contador (ESP)	Saxo Bank–Tinkoff Bank	82h 14' 52"
2	Alejandro Valverde (ESP)	Movistar Team	+ 1' 16"
3	Joaquim Rodríguez (ESP)	Team Katusha	+ 1' 37"
4	Chris Froome (GBR)	Team Sky	+ 10' 16"
5	Daniel Moreno (ESP)	Team Katusha	+ 11' 29"
6	Robert Gesink (NED)	Rabobank	+ 12' 23"
7	Andrew Talansky (USA)	Garmin–Sharp	+ 13' 28"
8	Laurens ten Dam (NED)	Rabobank	+ 13' 41"
9	Igor Antón (ESP)	Euskaltel–Euskadi	+ 14' 01"
10	Beñat Intxausti (ESP)	Movistar Team	+ 16' 13"

== Stage 21 ==
9 September 2012 — Cercedilla to Madrid, 115 km (71.5 mi)

The Vuelta concluded with the now-customary stage finish in the centre of Madrid. The stage had an easy start – with a long and gradual descent from the start town of Cercedilla – before ten high-speed laps of a 5.7 km (3.5 mi) circuit, followed by the sprint finish. In keeping with tradition, the final stage began at a slow pace, and was a largely ceremonial procession on the run into Madrid. Shortly after the riders reached the circuit in the centre of the city, an intermediate sprint was held at the first passage through the line; David Moncoutié of Cofidis and Rabobank's Grischa Niermann were allowed to pass through before the main field, as a gesture, ahead of their respective retirements from the professional peloton. After that, the main break was initiated by six riders on the opening lap of the Madrid circuit. The group – consisting of Andalucía pairing Sergio Carrasco and Javier Chacón, Astana's Kevin Seeldraeyers, Javier Aramendia of Caja Rural, Mikel Astarloza (Euskaltel–Euskadi) and Sergey Lagutin for Vacansoleil–DCM – were never allowed to gain more than half a minute in their exploits and were eventually caught with around 6 km (3.7 mi) remaining.

Lagutin was the last to be caught, just as the peloton started their final lap. Team Sky took up affairs on the front of the peloton, looking to get their sprinter Ben Swift a victory in the race but it was Argos–Shimano who set up their sprinter with the best run to the finish line. Having fended off the advances of Italian pairing Elia Viviani (Liquigas–Cannondale) and Daniele Bennati (RadioShack–Nissan), it was John Degenkolb that took his fifth stage victory of the race. Further behind, Saxo Bank–Tinkoff Bank's Alberto Contador finished within the peloton to take his second Vuelta overall title, while Simon Clarke (Orica–GreenEDGE) also confirmed his victory in the mountains classification. For the second year running, Joaquim Rodríguez (Team Katusha) lost the victory in the points classification on the final day, as a sixth place stage finish for Movistar Team's Alejandro Valverde allowed Valverde to overhaul Rodríguez's points tally by six. As a consequence of this, Valverde also claimed the combination classification on a tie-break, due to his second place overall finish to Rodríguez's third.

Stage 21 result

	Rider	Team	Time
1	John Degenkolb (GER)	Argos–Shimano	2h 44' 57"
2	Elia Viviani (ITA)	Liquigas–Cannondale	s.t.
3	Daniele Bennati (ITA)	RadioShack–Nissan	s.t.
4	Allan Davis (AUS)	Orica–GreenEDGE	s.t.
5	Koldo Fernández (ESP)	Garmin–Sharp	s.t.
6	Alejandro Valverde (ESP)	Movistar Team	s.t.
7	Gert Steegmans (BEL)	Omega Pharma–Quick-Step	s.t.
8	Zdeněk Štybar (CZE)	Omega Pharma–Quick-Step	s.t.
9	Raymond Kreder (NED)	Garmin–Sharp	s.t.
10	Gorka Verdugo (ESP)	Euskaltel–Euskadi	s.t.

Final General Classification

	Rider	Team	Time
1	Alberto Contador (ESP)	Saxo Bank–Tinkoff Bank	84h 59' 49"
2	Alejandro Valverde (ESP)	Movistar Team	+ 1' 16"
3	Joaquim Rodríguez (ESP)	Team Katusha	+ 1' 37"
4	Chris Froome (GBR)	Team Sky	+ 10' 16"
5	Daniel Moreno (ESP)	Team Katusha	+ 11' 29"
6	Robert Gesink (NED)	Rabobank	+ 12' 23"
7	Andrew Talansky (USA)	Garmin–Sharp	+ 13' 28"
8	Laurens ten Dam (NED)	Rabobank	+ 13' 41"
9	Igor Antón (ESP)	Euskaltel–Euskadi	+ 14' 01"
10	Beñat Intxausti (ESP)	Movistar Team	+ 16' 13"
