= 2012 Vuelta a España =

67th edition of the cycling race

2012 UCI World Tour, race 22 of 28
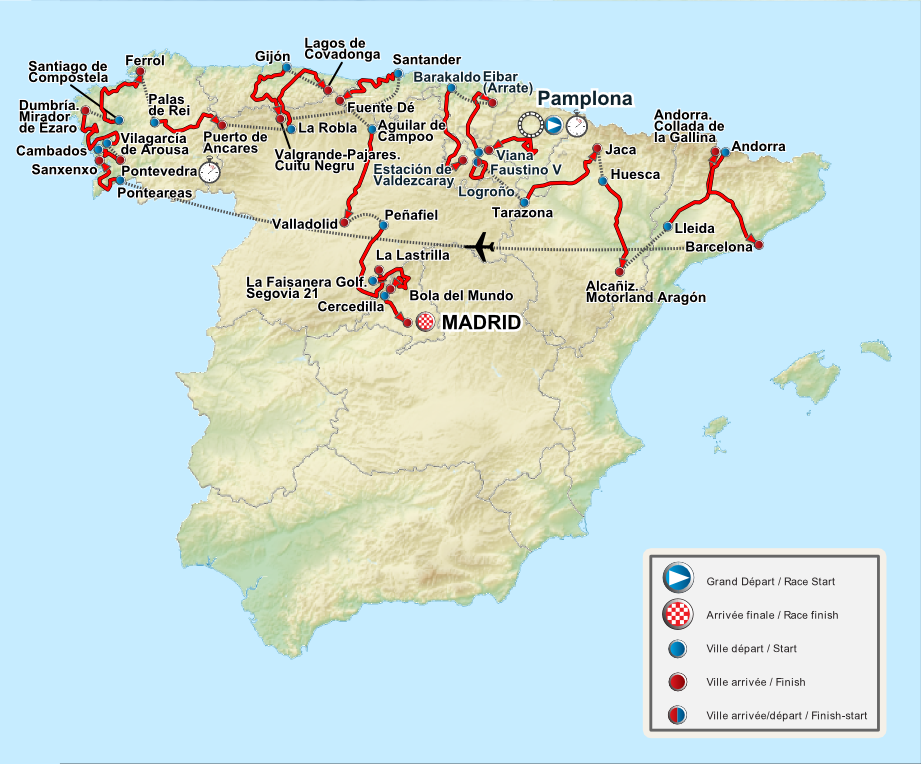

Race details
- Dates: 18 August – 9 September
- Stages: 21
- Distance: 3,360.2 km (2,088 mi)
- Winning time: 84h 59' 49"

Results
Jersey awarded to the overall winner	Winner	Alberto Contador (ESP)	(Saxo Bank–Tinkoff Bank)
	Second	Alejandro Valverde (ESP)	(Movistar Team)
	Third	Joaquim Rodríguez (ESP)	(Team Katusha)
Jersey awarded to the points classification winner	Points	Alejandro Valverde (ESP)	(Movistar Team)
Jersey awarded to the mountains classification winner	Mountains	Simon Clarke (AUS)	(Orica–GreenEDGE)
Jersey awarded to the combination classification winner	Combination	Alejandro Valverde (ESP)	(Movistar Team)
	Team	(Spain) Movistar Team	

The 2012 Vuelta a España started on 18 August 2012 and was the 67th edition of the race. The race began in Pamplona with a team time trial and ended on 9 September, as traditional, in Madrid. The 2012 edition saw the return of the Bola del Mundo mountain top finish. It was the venue of an exciting battle between winner Vincenzo Nibali and runner-up Ezequiel Mosquera in the 2010 edition. It was the first time since 1994 that the race visited the region of Navarre. The previous time that Pamplona was visited by a Grand Tour in 1996, when the city hosted the finish of a memorable stage of the 1996 Tour de France. On that occasion, the race paid homage to Miguel Indurain by passing through his home village of Villava en route.

The race was won for the second time by Alberto Contador of Saxo Bank–Tinkoff Bank, taking his first overall victory since returning from a doping suspension. Contador, who won the seventeenth stage of the race after a solo attack, won the general classification by 1' 16" over runner-up Alejandro Valverde of the Movistar Team team. Two-time stage winner Valverde also won two sub-classifications on the final day; by taking a sixth-place finish on the stage into Madrid, he overhauled the points tally of Joaquim Rodríguez (Team Katusha) in that classification, and their resultant switch of positions, allowed Valverde to take the combination classification – where the lowest cumulative score across the general, points and mountains classifications wins – as well.

Completing an all-Spanish podium, Rodríguez finished the race third overall, 21 seconds behind Valverde and 1' 37" behind Contador, having led the race for 13 days between the fourth and sixteenth stages. Rodríguez also achieved three stage victories, a tally second only to Argos–Shimano sprinter John Degenkolb who won five stages, the most by a German at the Vuelta. Orica–GreenEDGE's Simon Clarke became the second Australian to win the mountains classification in a Grand Tour, while the Movistar Team comfortably won the teams classification.

== Teams ==
The 18 UCI ProTour teams were automatically entitled to start the race and were joined by four teams that received a wildcard in April 2012.

The 18 ProTour teams:

- Ag2r–La Mondiale
- Astana
- BMC Racing Team
- Euskaltel–Euskadi
- FDJ–BigMat
- Garmin–Sharp
- Orica–GreenEDGE
- Team Katusha
- Lampre–ISD
- Liquigas–Cannondale
- Lotto–Belisol
- Movistar Team
- Omega Pharma–Quick-Step
- Rabobank
- RadioShack–Nissan
- Saxo Bank–Tinkoff Bank
- Team Sky
- Vacansoleil–DCM

Teams receiving a wildcard:

- Andalucía
- Caja Rural
- Cofidis
- Argos–Shimano

For more details, see List of teams and cyclists in the 2012 Vuelta a España.

== Pre-race favourites ==
The winner of the 2008 edition of the race, Alberto Contador, made his first Grand Tour appearance since his ban after testing positive for a banned substance at the 2010 Tour de France, and was considered by many the top favourite for overall victory. Another favourite was Chris Froome, who had at the time finished second in the 2011 Vuelta and 2012 Tour de France, and he started the 2012 Vuelta as team leader of Team Sky, having previously worked for Bradley Wiggins. The then winner of the 2011 edition, Juan José Cobo, was looking to replicate his previous year's form after a disappointing 2012 season, and he was co-leader of the Movistar Team alongside Alejandro Valverde.

Other contenders for the podium included Joaquim Rodríguez of Team Katusha, who finished second in the 2012 Giro d'Italia, Igor Antón of Euskaltel–Euskadi, Jurgen Van den Broeck of Lotto–Belisol, Damiano Cunego of Lampre–ISD and Robert Gesink of Rabobank.

Riders who could have made the top ten included Froome's Colombian teammates at Team Sky, Rigoberto Urán and Sergio Henao, Rabobank's Bauke Mollema, RadioShack–Nissan's Maxime Monfort, Vacansoleil–DCM's Thomas De Gendt and Ag2r–La Mondiale's Nicolas Roche.

== Route ==
Stage characteristics and winners
Stage	Date	Course	Distance	Type		Winner
1	18 August	Pamplona	16.5 km (10.3 mi)	Team Time Trial	Team Time Trial	(Spain) Movistar Team
2	19 August	Pamplona to Viana	181.4 km (112.7 mi)		Flat Stage	John Degenkolb (GER)
3	20 August	Oion to Arrate (Eibar)	155.3 km (96.5 mi)		Medium Mountain Stage	Alejandro Valverde (ESP)
4	21 August	Barakaldo to Valdezcaray	160.6 km (99.8 mi)		Medium Mountain Stage	Simon Clarke (AUS)
5	22 August	Logroño to Logroño	168 km (104 mi)		Flat Stage	John Degenkolb (GER)
6	23 August	Tarazona to El Fuerte del Rapitán (Jaca)	175.4 km (109.0 mi)		Medium Mountain Stage	Joaquim Rodríguez (ESP)
7	24 August	Huesca to Motorland Aragon (Alcañiz)	164.2 km (102.0 mi)		Flat Stage	John Degenkolb (GER)
8	25 August	Lleida to Coll de la Gallina	174.7 km (108.6 mi)		Mountain Stage	Alejandro Valverde (ESP)
9	26 August	Andorra to Barcelona	196.3 km (122.0 mi)		Flat Stage	Philippe Gilbert (BEL)
	27 August	Rest day				
10	28 August	Ponteareas to Sanxenxo	190 km (120 mi)		Flat Stage	John Degenkolb (GER)
11	29 August	Cambados to Pontevedra	39.4 km (24.5 mi)	Team Time Trial	Individual Time Trial	Fredrik Kessiakoff (SWE)
12	30 August	Vilagarcía to Mirador de Ézaro (Dumbría)	190.5 km (118.4 mi)		Medium Mountain Stage	Joaquim Rodríguez (ESP)
13	31 August	Santiago de Compostela to Ferrol	172.8 km (107.4 mi)		Flat Stage	Steve Cummings (GBR)
14	1 September	Palas de Rei to Los Ancares	149.2 km (92.7 mi)		Mountain Stage	Joaquim Rodríguez (ESP)
15	2 September	La Robla to Lagos de Covadonga	186.5 km (115.9 mi)		Mountain Stage	Antonio Piedra (ESP)
16	3 September	Gijón to Cuitu Negru	183.5 km (114.0 mi)		Mountain Stage	Dario Cataldo (ITA)
	4 September	Rest day				
17	5 September	Santander to Fuente Dé	187.3 km (116.4 mi)		Medium Mountain Stage	Alberto Contador (ESP)
18	6 September	Aguilar de Campoo to Valladolid	204.5 km (127.1 mi)		Flat Stage	Daniele Bennati (ITA)
19	7 September	Peñafiel to La Lastrilla	178.4 km (110.9 mi)		Flat Stage	Philippe Gilbert (BEL)
20	8 September	Palazuelos de Eresma to Bola del Mundo	170.7 km (106.1 mi)		Mountain Stage	Denis Menchov (RUS)
21	9 September	Cercedilla to Madrid	115 km (71 mi)		Flat Stage	John Degenkolb (GER)
Total			3,360.2 km (2,087.9 mi)			

== Race overview ==
For details see 2012 Vuelta a España, Stage 1 to Stage 11 and 2012 Vuelta a España, Stage 12 to Stage 21

== Classification leadership table ==
There were four main classifications contested in the 2012 Vuelta a España, with the most important being the general classification. The general classification was calculated by adding each cyclist's finishing times on each stage. The cyclist with the least accumulated time was the race leader, identified by the red jersey; the winner of this classification was considered the winner of the Vuelta. In 2012, there were time bonuses given on mass-start stages; twelve seconds were awarded to the stage winner, with eight for second and four for third.

Additionally, there was a points classification, which awards a green jersey. In the points classification, cyclists get points for finishing among the best in a stage finish, or in intermediate sprints. The cyclist with the most points led the classification, and is identified with a green jersey. There was also a mountains classification. The organisation categorised some climbs as either hors catégorie, first, second, third, or fourth-category; points for this classification were won by the first cyclists that reach the top of these climbs, with more points available for the higher-categorised climbs. The cyclist with the most points led the classification, and was identified with a blue polka dot jersey.

The fourth individual classification was the combination classification, marked by the white jersey. This classification is calculated by adding the numeral ranks of each cyclist in the general, points and mountains classifications – a rider must have a score in all classifications possible to qualify for the combination classification – with the lowest cumulative total signifying the winner of this competition.

For the team classification, the times of the best three cyclists per team on each stage were added; the leading team is the team with the lowest total time. For the combativity award, a jury gives points after each stage to the cyclists they considered most combative. The cyclist with the most votes in all stages leads the classification. For the daily combative winner, the rider in question donned a dossard with a red background, on the following stage.

Stage	Winner	General classification	Points classification	Mountains classification	Combination classification	Team classification	Combativity award
1	Movistar Team	Jonathan Castroviejo	not awarded	not awarded	not awarded	Movistar Team	Imanol Erviti
2	John Degenkolb	Jonathan Castroviejo	John Degenkolb	Javier Chacón	Javier Chacón	Movistar Team	Javier Aramendia
3	Alejandro Valverde	Alejandro Valverde	Alejandro Valverde	Pim Ligthart	Alejandro Valverde	Movistar Team	Philippe Gilbert
4	Simon Clarke	Joaquim Rodríguez	Simon Clarke	Simon Clarke	Joaquim Rodríguez	Rabobank	Luis Ángel Maté
5	John Degenkolb	Joaquim Rodríguez	John Degenkolb	Simon Clarke	Joaquim Rodríguez	Rabobank	Javier Chacón
6	Joaquim Rodríguez	Joaquim Rodríguez	John Degenkolb	Simon Clarke	Joaquim Rodríguez	Team Sky	Thomas De Gendt
7	John Degenkolb	Joaquim Rodríguez	John Degenkolb	Simon Clarke	Joaquim Rodríguez	Team Sky	Javier Aramendia
8	Alejandro Valverde	Joaquim Rodríguez	John Degenkolb	Alejandro Valverde	Joaquim Rodríguez	Rabobank	Javier Aramendia
9	Philippe Gilbert	Joaquim Rodríguez	Joaquim Rodríguez	Alejandro Valverde	Joaquim Rodríguez	Rabobank	Javier Chacón
10	John Degenkolb	Joaquim Rodríguez	John Degenkolb	Alejandro Valverde	Joaquim Rodríguez	Rabobank	Javier Aramendia
11	Fredrik Kessiakoff	Joaquim Rodríguez	John Degenkolb	Alejandro Valverde	Joaquim Rodríguez	Rabobank	Fredrik Kessiakoff
12	Joaquim Rodríguez	Joaquim Rodríguez	Joaquim Rodríguez	Alejandro Valverde	Joaquim Rodríguez	Rabobank	Mikel Astarloza
13	Steve Cummings	Joaquim Rodríguez	Joaquim Rodríguez	Alejandro Valverde	Joaquim Rodríguez	Rabobank	Juan Antonio Flecha
14	Joaquim Rodríguez	Joaquim Rodríguez	Joaquim Rodríguez	Simon Clarke	Joaquim Rodríguez	Rabobank	Juan Manuel Gárate
15	Antonio Piedra	Joaquim Rodríguez	Joaquim Rodríguez	Simon Clarke	Joaquim Rodríguez	Movistar Team	Antonio Piedra
16	Dario Cataldo	Joaquim Rodríguez	Joaquim Rodríguez	Simon Clarke	Joaquim Rodríguez	Movistar Team	Dario Cataldo
17	Alberto Contador	Alberto Contador	Joaquim Rodríguez	Simon Clarke	Joaquim Rodríguez	Movistar Team	Alberto Contador
18	Daniele Bennati	Alberto Contador	Joaquim Rodríguez	Simon Clarke	Joaquim Rodríguez	Movistar Team	Gatis Smukulis
19	Philippe Gilbert	Alberto Contador	Joaquim Rodríguez	Simon Clarke	Joaquim Rodríguez	Movistar Team	Ji Cheng
20	Denis Menchov	Alberto Contador	Joaquim Rodríguez	Simon Clarke	Joaquim Rodríguez	Movistar Team	Simon Clarke
21	John Degenkolb	Alberto Contador	Alejandro Valverde	Simon Clarke	Alejandro Valverde	Movistar Team	not awarded
Final		Alberto Contador	Alejandro Valverde	Simon Clarke	Alejandro Valverde	Movistar Team	Alberto Contador

Notes

- In stage 3, Javier Aramendia, who was second in the combination classification, wore the white jersey, because Javier Chacón (in first place) wore the blue polka-dot jersey as leader of the mountains classification during that stage.
- In stage 4, John Degenkolb, who was second in the points classification, wore the green jersey, because Alejandro Valverde (in first place) wore the red jersey as leader of the general classification during that stage. As well as that, Joaquim Rodríguez, who was second in the combination classification, wore the white jersey as Valverde also holds the lead of that classification.
- In stage 5, Pim Ligthart, who was second in the mountains classification, wore the blue polka-dot jersey, because Simon Clarke (in first place) wore the green jersey as leader of the points classification during that stage. As well as that, Alejandro Valverde, who was second in the combination classification wore the white jersey as Joaquim Rodríguez wore the red jersey as leader of the general classification.
- In stages 6, 7 and 8, Alejandro Valverde, who was second in the combination classification wore the white jersey as Joaquim Rodríguez (in first place) wore the red jersey as leader of the general classification.
- In stages 9, 10 and 11, Chris Froome, who was third in the combination classification wore the white jersey as Joaquim Rodríguez (in first place) wore the red jersey as leader of the general classification, and Alejandro Valverde (in second place) wore the blue polka-dot jersey as leader of the mountains classification.
- In stage 10, John Degenkolb, who was second in the points classification wore the green jersey as Joaquim Rodríguez (in first place) wore the red jersey as leader of the general classification.
- In stages 12, 13 and 14, Alberto Contador, who was third in the combination classification wore the white jersey as Joaquim Rodríguez (in first place) wore the red jersey as leader of the general classification, and Alejandro Valverde (in second place) wore the blue polka-dot jersey as leader of the mountains classification.
- In stage 13, John Degenkolb, who was third in the points classification wore the green jersey as Joaquim Rodríguez (in first place) wore the red jersey as leader of the general classification, and Alejandro Valverde (in second place) wore the blue polka-dot jersey as leader of the mountains classification. In stage 14, Degenkolb still wore the green jersey, as the second-placed rider in the points classification.
- In stages 15, 16 and 17, Alejandro Valverde, who was second in the points classification, wore the green jersey, as Joaquim Rodríguez (in first place) wore the red jersey as leader of the general classification and Alberto Contador, who was third in the combination classification, wore the white jersey.
- In stages 18 and 19, Alejandro Valverde, who is second in the combination classification, will wear the white jersey, as Joaquim Rodríguez (in first place) will wear the green jersey as leader of the points classification.

== Standings ==
=== General classification ===
	Rider	Team	Time
1	Alberto Contador (ESP)	Saxo Bank–Tinkoff Bank	84h 59' 49"
2	Alejandro Valverde (ESP)	Movistar Team	+ 1' 16"
3	Joaquim Rodríguez (ESP)	Team Katusha	+ 1' 37"
4	Chris Froome (GBR)	Team Sky	+ 10' 16"
5	Daniel Moreno (ESP)	Team Katusha	+ 11' 29"
6	Robert Gesink (NED)	Rabobank	+ 12' 23"
7	Andrew Talansky (USA)	Garmin–Sharp	+ 13' 28"
8	Laurens ten Dam (NED)	Rabobank	+ 13' 41"
9	Igor Antón (ESP)	Euskaltel–Euskadi	+ 14' 01"
10	Beñat Intxausti (ESP)	Movistar Team	+ 16' 13"

=== Points classification ===
	Rider	Team	Points
1	Alejandro Valverde (ESP)	Movistar Team	199
2	Joaquim Rodríguez (ESP)	Team Katusha	193
3	Alberto Contador (ESP)	Saxo Bank–Tinkoff Bank	161
4	John Degenkolb (GER)	Argos–Shimano	149
5	Daniele Bennati (ITA)	RadioShack–Nissan	107
6	Chris Froome (GBR)	Team Sky	93
7	Allan Davis (AUS)	Orica–GreenEDGE	84
8	Elia Viviani (ITA)	Liquigas–Cannondale	79
9	Lloyd Mondory (FRA)	Ag2r–La Mondiale	74
10	Daniel Moreno (ESP)	Team Katusha	72

=== King of the Mountains classification ===
	Rider	Team	Points
1	Simon Clarke (AUS)	Orica–GreenEDGE	63
2	David de la Fuente (ESP)	Caja Rural	40
3	Joaquim Rodríguez (ESP)	Team Katusha	36
4	Thomas De Gendt (BEL)	Vacansoleil–DCM	33
5	Alejandro Valverde (ESP)	Movistar Team	31
6	Alberto Contador (ESP)	Saxo Bank–Tinkoff Bank	28
7	Dario Cataldo (ITA)	Omega Pharma–Quick-Step	27
8	Richie Porte (AUS)	Team Sky	21
9	Denis Menchov (RUS)	Team Katusha	20
10	David Moncoutié (FRA)	Cofidis	18

=== Combination classification ===
	Rider	Team	Total
1	Alejandro Valverde (ESP)	Movistar Team	8
2	Joaquim Rodríguez (ESP)	Team Katusha	8
3	Alberto Contador (ESP)	Saxo Bank–Tinkoff Bank	10
4	Chris Froome (GBR)	Team Sky	30
5	Daniel Moreno (ESP)	Team Katusha	48
6	Nicolas Roche (IRL)	Ag2r–La Mondiale	65
7	Eros Capecchi (ITA)	Liquigas–Cannondale	79
8	Thomas De Gendt (BEL)	Vacansoleil–DCM	80
9	Dario Cataldo (ITA)	Omega Pharma–Quick-Step	85
10	Sergio Henao (COL)	Team Sky	88

=== Team classification ===
Pos.	Team	Time
1	(Spain) Movistar Team	254h 52' 49"
2	(Spain) Euskaltel–Euskadi	+ 9' 40"
3	(France) Ag2r–La Mondiale	+ 20' 19"
4	(Netherlands) Rabobank	+ 23' 48"
5	(United Kingdom) Team Sky	+ 26' 55″
6	Team Katusha	+ 36' 07"
7	(Italy) Lampre–ISD	+ 53' 00″
8	(Denmark) Saxo Bank–Tinkoff Bank	+ 1h 1' 11"
9	(Luxembourg) RadioShack–Nissan	+ 1h 17' 34"
10	(Spain) Caja Rural	+ 1h 25' 10"
