= Ji Cheng (cyclist) =

Chinese cyclist

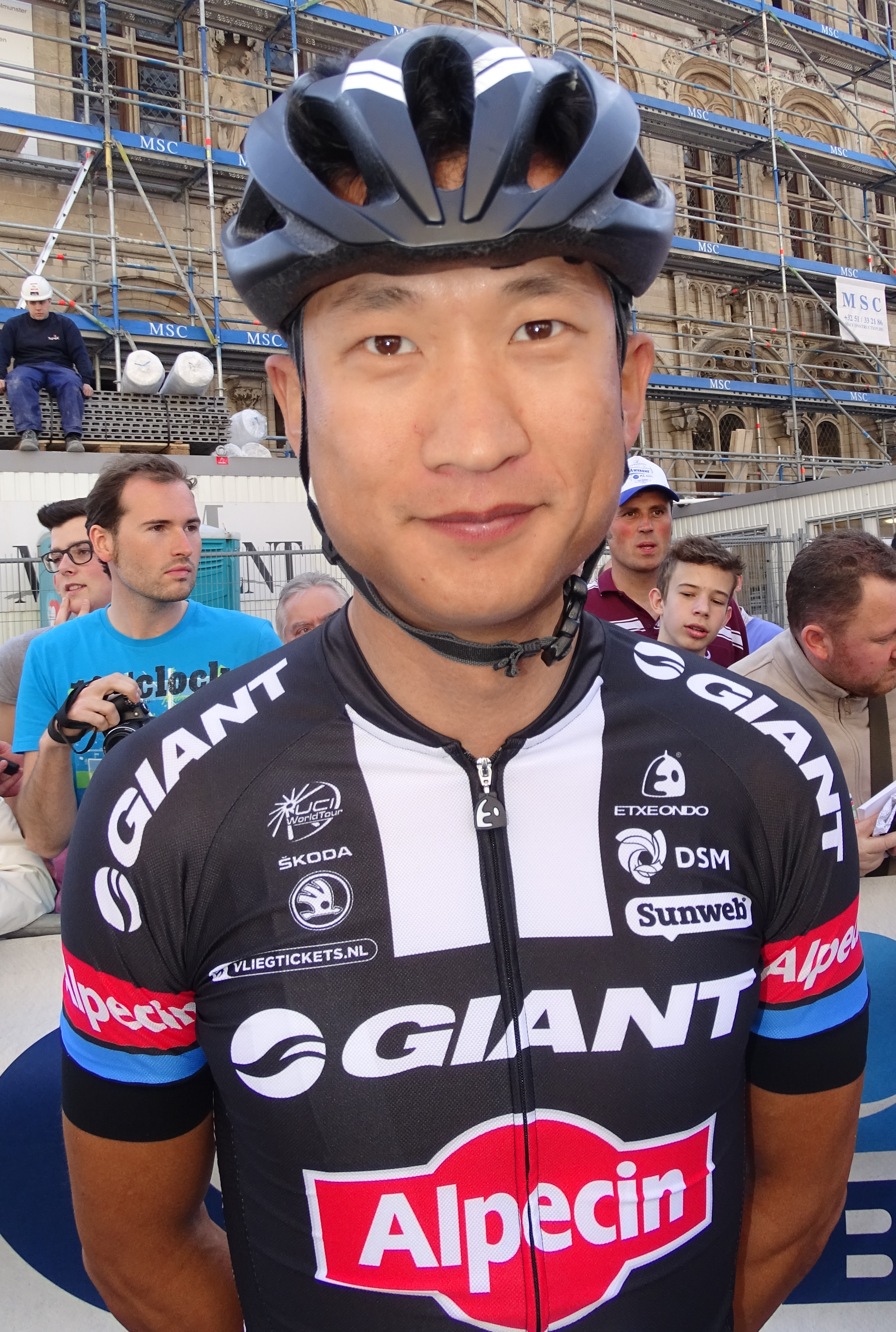
- Ji at the 2015 Brabantse Pijl.

Personal information
- Full name: Ji Cheng
- Nickname: Breakaway killer
- Born: July 15, 1987 (age 39) Harbin, Heilongjiang, China
- Height: 1.78 m (5 ft 10 in)
- Weight: 67 kg (148 lb; 10.6 st)

Cycling career
- Sport: Cycling
- Discipline: Road
- Role: Rider

Professional teams
- 2006: Purapharm
- 2007–2016: Skil–Shimano

Ji Cheng (simplified Chinese: 计成; traditional Chinese: 計成; pinyin: Jì Chéng; born 15 July 1987) is a Chinese former professional cyclist, who rode professionally between 2006 and 2016 for Purapharm and Team Giant–Alpecin.

== Career ==
Before taking up cycling, Ji competed as a runner whilst at school. One factor which led to him switching sports was the weather in his hometown, the northern city of Harbin, where temperatures can drop to −20 °C (−4 °F) in winter, when Ji could train for cycling indoors. Initially a track cyclist, he later switched to road racing. Ji moved to Europe in 2006, competing in amateur criterium races in the Netherlands before turning professional.

In 2012, Ji became the first Chinese rider to race in, and complete, a Grand Tour, when he finished 175th at the Vuelta a España. By taking the start in the 2013 Giro d'Italia, he likewise became the first Chinese cyclist to start that race. The following year he was selected for the 2014 Tour de France, and became the first Chinese rider to compete in the Tour. Ji managed to complete the race despite a knee injury, finishing last as the 2014 race's lanterne rouge.

== Major results ==
2008
1st Stage 1 Tour of South China Sea
2012
Combativity award Stage 19 Vuelta a España

=== Grand Tour general classification results timeline ===
Grand Tour	2012	2013	2014	2015	2016
Giro d'Italia	—	DNF	—	156	154
Tour de France	—	—	164	—	—
Vuelta a España	175	—	—	—	—

Legend
—	Did not compete
DNF	Did not finish
