= Javier Chacón =

Spanish cyclist

Personal information
- Full name: Javier Chacón Quesada
- Born: 29 July 1985 (age 41) Vélez-Rubio, Spain
- Height: 1.85 m (6 ft 1 in)
- Weight: 70 kg (150 lb; 11 st)

Cycling career
- Sport: Cycling
- Discipline: Road
- Role: Rider

Amateur teams
- 2008–2009: Cafemax–Contentpolis
- 2008: Contentpolis–Murcia (stagiaire)
- 2011: Andalucía–Caja Granada (stagiaire)

Professional teams
- 2010–2011: Heraklion Kastro–Murcia
- 2012: Andalucía
- 2014: Keith Mobel–Partizan

Managerial team
- 2015: Keith Mobel–Partizan

Javier Chacón Quesada (born 29 July 1985) is a Spanish former professional road bicycle racer.

Born in Vélez-Rubio, Chacón has competed as a fully-fledged professional since the start of the 2012 season, riding as a member of the Andalucía team. In his first Grand Tour event, the 2012 Vuelta a España, Chacón featured in the breakaway during two of the first four road stages; the second of which came on the fifth stage, where he initiated a solo breakaway lasting for almost 140 km (87.0 mi) of the 168 km (104.4 mi) stage.

== Major results ==
2006
1st National Under-23 Time Trial Championships
1st Overall Vuelta a Segovia

1st Stage 1

1st Stage 2 (TTT) Vuelta a Palencia
2008
1st Circuito Deputación de Pontevedra
3rd National Amateur Time Trial Championships
9th Overall Volta da Ascension
2009
1st Trofeo Guerrita
2010
1st Stage 10 Vuelta a Venezuela
5th Overall Tour de Serbie
2011
1st Stage 4 Vuelta Ciclista Internacional a Extremadura
4th GP Loinaz Beasain
2012
4th Overall Azerbaijan International Cycling Tour

1st Stage 5
