= Dario Cataldo =

Italian road bicycle racer

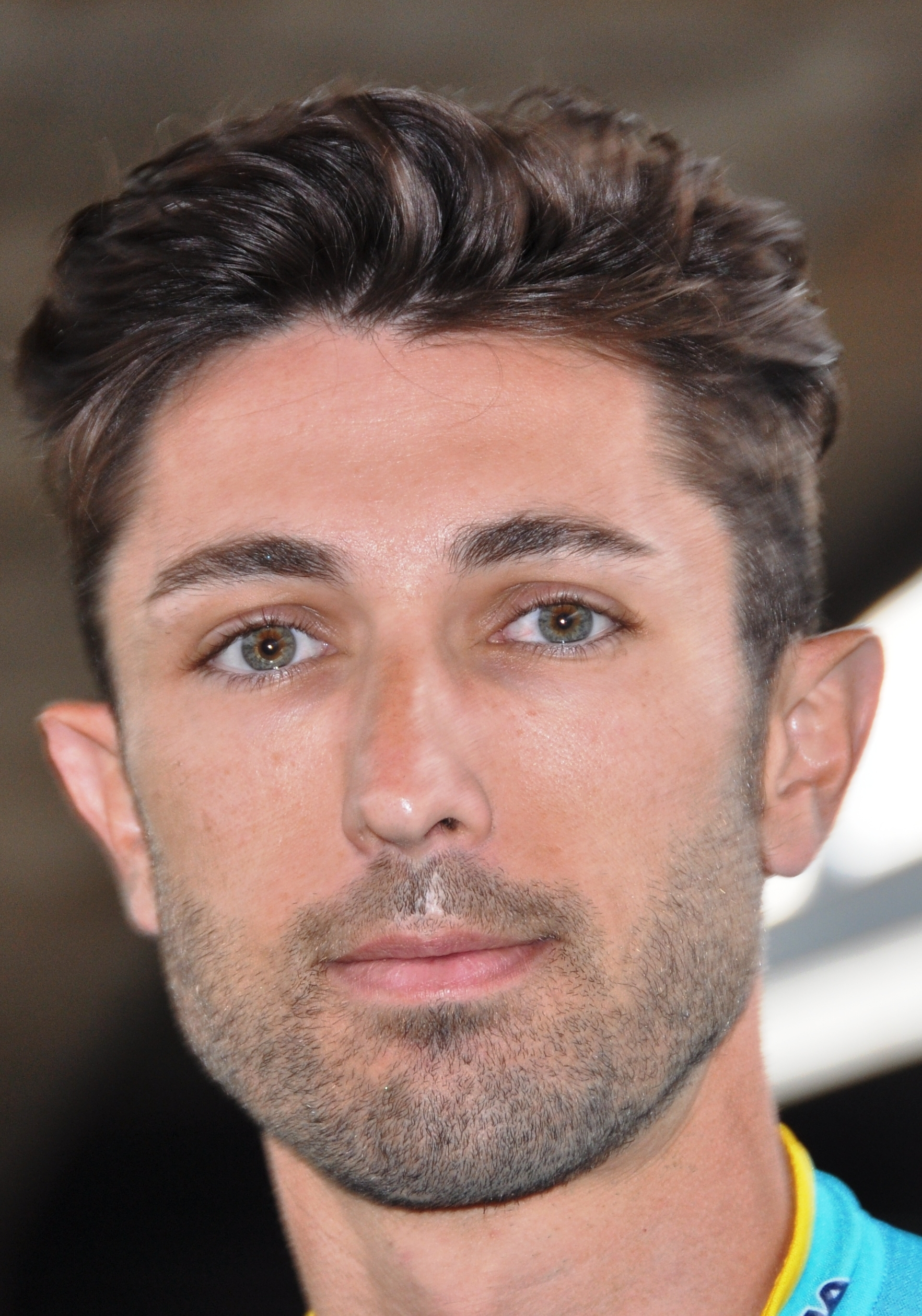
- Cataldo at the 2017 Tour de France.

Personal information
- Full name: Dario Cataldo
- Nickname: Picasso
- Born: 17 March 1985 (age 41) Lanciano, Italy
- Height: 1.75 m (5 ft 9 in)
- Weight: 64 kg (141 lb)

Cycling career
- Sport: Cycling
- Discipline: Road
- Role: Rider
- Rider type: All-rounder

Professional teams
- 2007–2008: Liquigas
- 2009–2012: Quick-Step
- 2013–2014: Team Sky
- 2015–2019: Astana
- 2020–2021: Movistar Team
- 2022–2024: Trek–Segafredo

Major wins
- Grand Tours Giro d'Italia 1 individual stage (2019) 1 TTT stage (2013) Vuelta a España 1 individual stage (2012) 1 TTT stage (2019) One-day races and Classics National Time Trial Championships (2012)

Dario Cataldo (born 17 March 1985) is an Italian former road bicycle racer, who competed as a professional from 2007 to 2024.

== Career ==
=== Liquigas (2007–08) ===
After surprisingly winning the Baby Giro in 2006, Cataldo signed as a neo-professional for Liquigas for the 2007 season. In January 2007, Cataldo was hit by a car while training and broke his right wrist. Later that year, Cataldo won two stages in the Tour de l'Avenir. After a disappointing year in 2008, Liquigas did not renew his contract.

=== Quick Step (2009–12) ===
In 2009, Cataldo switched to the Quick-Step team. For his first two years, Cataldo failed to make a huge impact however in 2012, he began to reach his potential. Cataldo won the 2012 Italian National Time Trial Championships and finished in 12th place at the Giro d'Italia. Cataldo won the queen stage of the 2012 Vuelta a España, stage 16 finishing atop a climb which was featured for the first time in the Vuelta, the Cuitu Negru. He escaped with Thomas De Gendt of the Vacansoleil–DCM squad early in the race and they were never caught. Cataldo shook off De Gendt with less than 2 km (1.2 mi) to race on the very steep final part of the stage, reaching more than 20% gradient in places. He managed to lift his arms for a second as he crossed the line for the 'victory pose' before slumping over his handlebars with fatigue.

=== Team Sky (2013–14) ===
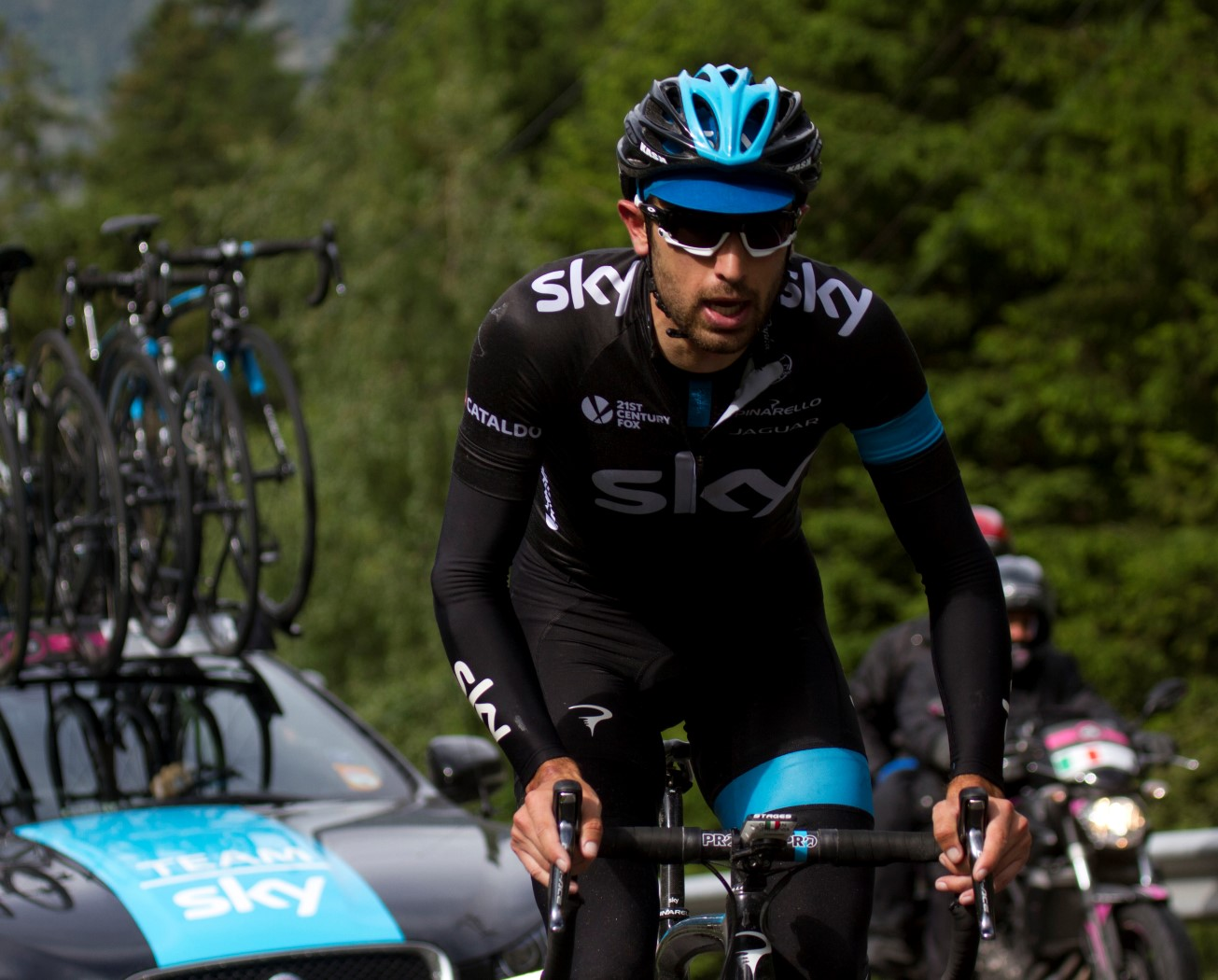
Cataldo at the 2014 Giro d'Italia

His success in 2012 saw him earn a move to UCI World Tour champions Team Sky, where he was expected to play the role of a super-domestique for either Bradley Wiggins at the Giro d'Italia or Chris Froome at the Tour de France.

In October 2014 Astana announced they had signed Cataldo for the 2015 season, with the team's general manager Alexander Vinokourov describing his role as being a climbing lieutenant for Vincenzo Nibali and Fabio Aru, as well as contributing to the team's performance in team time trials.

=== Astana (2015–19) ===
In June 2017, he was named in the startlist for the 2017 Tour de France. His tour ended when he withdrew due to injury on 12 July, caused by a crash in the feed zone.

== Major results ==
2003
6th Trofeo Buffoni
6th Giro della Toscana
2006
1st Overall Girobio
2007
1st Stage 1 (TTT) Settimana Ciclistica Lombarda
3rd Rund um den Henninger Turm
4th Giro del Veneto
10th Overall Tour de l'Avenir

1st Points classification
1st Mountains classification
1st Stages 2 & 7

10th Coppa Ugo Agostoni
2008
1st Stage 1b (TTT) Settimana Internazionale di Coppi e Bartali
2009
5th Overall Tour of Missouri
5th Gran Premio Bruno Beghelli
5th Coppa Lella Mentasti – GP Città di Stresa
2010 (1 pro win)
1st Gran Premio Bruno Beghelli
2nd Time trial, National Road Championships
2011
7th Trofeo Magalluf-Palmanova
9th Overall Tour of Beijing
2012 (2)
1st Time trial, National Road Championships
1st Stage 16 Vuelta a España
1st Stage 2b (TTT) Tour de l'Ain
9th Overall Volta a Catalunya
2013
1st Stage 2 (TTT) Giro d'Italia
1st Stage 1b (TTT) Giro del Trentino
2014 (1)
2nd Time trial, National Road Championships
2nd Overall Settimana Internazionale di Coppi e Bartali

1st Stages 1b (TTT) & 4 (ITT)

2015
4th Overall Giro del Trentino
2016
1st Stage 2 (TTT) Vuelta a Burgos
8th Vuelta a Murcia
9th Overall Tour de Pologne
2017
4th Time trial, National Road Championships
2018
1st Mountains classification, Critérium du Dauphiné
3rd Overall Tour of Austria
2019 (1)
1st Stage 15 Giro d'Italia
1st Stage 1 (TTT) Vuelta a España
8th Overall Tour of the Alps

=== Grand Tour general classification results timeline ===
Grand Tour	2008	2009	2010	2011	2012	2013	2014	2015	2016	2017	2018	2019	2020	2021	2022
Giro d'Italia	DNF	54	DNF	12	12	56	26	25	—	14	—	48	66	54	73
Tour de France	—	—	—	—	—	—	—	—	—	DNF	—	—	80	—	—
/ Vuelta a España	—	—	71	131	51	74	DNF	57	51	—	64	68	—	—	117

Legend
—	Did not compete
DNF	Did not finish
