= Javier Aramendia =

Spanish cyclist

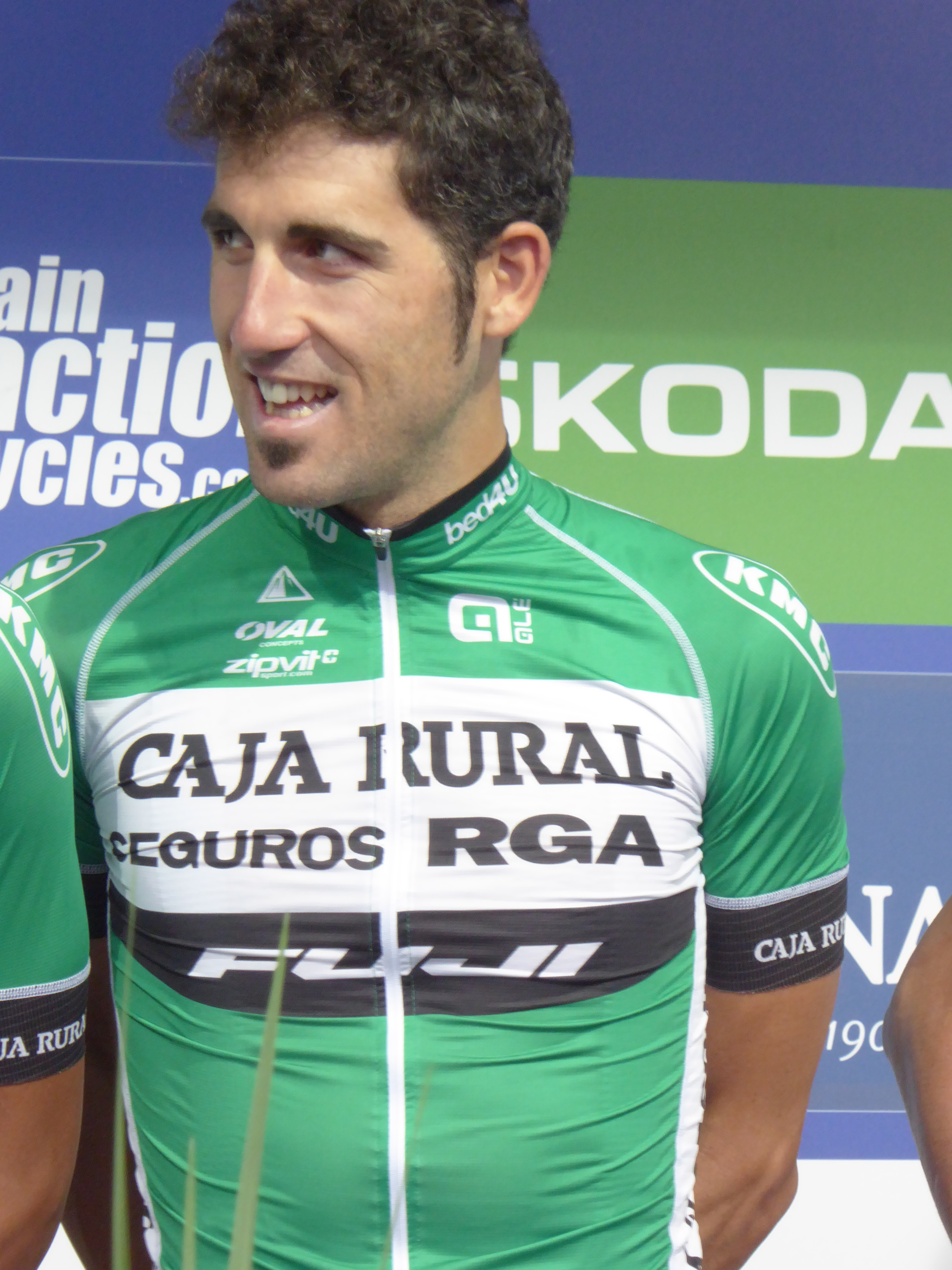
- Aramendia at the 2016 Tour of Britain

Personal information
- Full name: Francisco Javier Aramendia Llorente
- Born: 5 December 1986 (age 39) Pamplona, Spain
- Height: 1.87 m (6 ft 2 in)
- Weight: 70 kg (154 lb)

Cycling career
- Sport: Cycling
- Current team: Retired
- Discipline: Road
- Role: Rider
- Rider type: Breakaway specialist

Amateur team
- 2007: Orbea–Oreka SDA

Professional teams
- 2008–2011: Euskaltel–Euskadi
- 2012–2016: Caja Rural

Francisco Javier Aramendia Llorente (born 5 December 1986) is a Spanish former professional road bicycle racer, who rode professionally between 2008 and 2016 for the Euskaltel–Euskadi and Caja Rural–Seguros RGA teams.

== Career ==
Aramendia was born in Pamplona. At the 2012 Vuelta a España, Aramendia distinguished himself by being part of numerous long breakaways, earning the Combativity award four times in the process, the most at the Vuelta. It looked like he had a great chance to win the "Most Combative" title for the whole race, but Alberto Contador prevailed. Aramendia was named the most combative rider overall in the 2013 Vuelta a España, after taking the award three times in the individual stages.

== Major results ==
2006
1st Stage 2 Bizkaiko Bira
2007
7th Overall Vuelta a Extremadura
2012
Vuelta a España

Combativity award Stages 2, 7, 8 & 10

2013
Vuelta a España

Combativity award Stages 7, 9, 17 & Overall

2014
Vuelta a España

Combativity award Stages 2, 8 & 15
