= List of teams and cyclists in the 2013 Giro d'Italia =

The 2013 Giro d'Italia will be the 96th edition of Giro d'Italia, one of cycling's Grand Tours. The Giro will feature over 200 riders from 23 cycling teams, due to Team Katusha becoming the 19th UCI World Tour team during 2013.

== Teams ==
Among the 23 teams who will take part in the Giro, 19 will be UCI World Tour teams, and four will be Professional Continental teams. Originally, the 18 UCI Pro Teams were granted automatic invitations to the race, along with 4 wildcards, Androni Giocattoli–Venezuela, Bardiani Valvole–CSF Inox, Colombia and Vini Fantini–Selle Italia. Later the Court of Arbitration for Sport reawarded Team Katusha a place in the UCI World Tour, making them the 23rd team to take part, taking the total number of riders above 200.

- Ag2r–La Mondiale
- Androni Giocattoli–Venezuela*
- Argos–Shimano
- Astana
- Bardiani Valvole–CSF Inox*
- Blanco Pro Cycling
- BMC Racing Team
- Cannondale
- Colombia*
- Euskaltel–Euskadi
- FDJ
- Garmin–Sharp
- Lampre–Merida
- Lotto–Belisol
- Movistar Team
- Omega Pharma–Quick-Step
- Orica–GreenEDGE
- RadioShack–Leopard
- Team Katusha
- Saxo–Tinkoff
- Team Sky
- Vacansoleil–DCM
- Vini Fantini–Selle Italia*

*: Pro Continental teams given wild card entry to this event.

== By rider ==
Legend
No.	Starting number worn by the rider during the Giro
Pos.	Position in the general classification
†	Denotes riders born on or after 1 January 1988 eligible for the Young rider classification
A pink jersey	Denotes the winner of the General classification
A red jersey	Denotes the winner of the Points classification
A blue jersey	Denotes the winner of the Mountains classification
A white jersey	Denotes the winner of the Young rider classification (eligibility indicated by †)
DNS	Denotes a rider who did not start, followed by the stage before which he withdrew
DNF	Denotes a rider who did not finish, followed by the stage in which he withdrew
HD	Denotes a rider who failed to finish within the time limit, followed by the stage in which this occurred
DSQ	Denotes a rider who was disqualified from the race, followed by the stage during which this occurred
Age correct as of 4 May 2013, the date on which the Giro began

No.	Name	Nationality	Team	Age	Position
1	Ryder Hesjedal	Canada	Garmin–Sharp	32	DNS-13
2	Tom Danielson	United States	Garmin–Sharp	35	49
3	Thomas Dekker	Netherlands	Garmin–Sharp	28	136
4	Nathan Haas†	Australia	Garmin–Sharp	24	DNF-16
5	Ramūnas Navardauskas†	Lithuania	Garmin–Sharp	25	87
6	Robert Hunter	South Africa	Garmin–Sharp	37	141
7	David Millar	Great Britain	Garmin–Sharp	36	DNF-14
8	Peter Stetina	United States	Garmin–Sharp	25	52
9	Christian Vande Velde	United States	Garmin–Sharp	36	110
11	Domenico Pozzovivo	Italy	Ag2r–La Mondiale	30	10
12	Davide Appollonio†	Italy	Ag2r–La Mondiale	23	168
13	Manuel Belletti	Italy	Ag2r–La Mondiale	27	144
14	Julien Bérard	France	Ag2r–La Mondiale	25	DNS-8
15	Carlos Betancur†	Colombia	Ag2r–La Mondiale	23	5
16	Guillaume Bonnafond	France	Ag2r–La Mondiale	25	107
17	Hubert Dupont	France	Ag2r–La Mondiale	32	32
18	Ben Gastauer	Luxembourg	Ag2r–La Mondiale	25	51
19	Sylvain Georges	France	Ag2r–La Mondiale	29	DNS-11
21	Franco Pellizotti	Italy	Androni Giocattoli–Venezuela	35	11
22	Giairo Ermeti	Italy	Androni Giocattoli–Venezuela	32	151
23	Fabio Felline†	Italy	Androni Giocattoli–Venezuela	23	43
24	Mattia Gavazzi	Italy	Androni Giocattoli–Venezuela	29	DSQ-16
25	Tomás Gil	Venezuela	Androni Giocattoli–Venezuela	35	DNF-9
26	Jackson Rodríguez	Venezuela	Androni Giocattoli–Venezuela	28	50
27	Diego Rosa†	Italy	Androni Giocattoli–Venezuela	24	23
28	Miguel Ángel Rubiano	Colombia	Androni Giocattoli–Venezuela	28	45
29	Emanuele Sella	Italy	Androni Giocattoli–Venezuela	32	58
31	Vincenzo Nibali	Italy	Astana	28	1
32	Valerio Agnoli	Italy	Astana	29	39
33	Fabio Aru†	Italy	Astana	22	42
34	Dmitriy Gruzdev	Kazakhstan	Astana	27	146
35	Tanel Kangert	Estonia	Astana	26	14
36	Fredrik Kessiakoff	Sweden	Astana	32	90
37	Paolo Tiralongo	Italy	Astana	35	99
38	Alessandro Vanotti	Italy	Astana	32	DNF-14
39	Andrey Zeits	Kazakhstan	Astana	26	106
41	Sacha Modolo	Italy	Bardiani Valvole–CSF Inox	25	125
42	Enrico Battaglin†	Italy	Bardiani Valvole–CSF Inox	23	DNF-14
43	Nicola Boem†	Italy	Bardiani Valvole–CSF Inox	23	137
44	Francesco Manuel Bongiorno†	Italy	Bardiani Valvole–CSF Inox	22	71
45	Marco Canola†	Italy	Bardiani Valvole–CSF Inox	24	139
46	Sonny Colbrelli†	Italy	Bardiani Valvole–CSF Inox	22	89
47	Stefano Locatelli†	Italy	Bardiani Valvole–CSF Inox	24	102
48	Stefano Pirazzi	Italy	Bardiani Valvole–CSF Inox	26	44
49	Edoardo Zardini†	Italy	Bardiani Valvole–CSF Inox	23	138
51	Robert Gesink	Netherlands	Blanco Pro Cycling	26	DNS-20
52	Jack Bobridge†	Australia	Blanco Pro Cycling	23	DNS-14
53	Stef Clement	Netherlands	Blanco Pro Cycling	30	48
54	Juan Manuel Gárate	Spain	Blanco Pro Cycling	37	31
55	Wilco Kelderman†	Netherlands	Blanco Pro Cycling	22	17
56	Steven Kruijswijk	Netherlands	Blanco Pro Cycling	25	26
57	Paul Martens	Germany	Blanco Pro Cycling	29	63
58	Maarten Tjallingii	Netherlands	Blanco Pro Cycling	35	131
59	Maarten Wynants	Belgium	Blanco Pro Cycling	30	DNF-16
61	Cadel Evans	Australia	BMC Racing Team	36	3
62	Adam Blythe†	Great Britain	BMC Racing Team	23	167
63	Steve Cummings	Great Britain	BMC Racing Team	32	149
64	Klaas Lodewyck†	Belgium	BMC Racing Team	25	DNS-7
65	Steve Morabito	Switzerland	BMC Racing Team	30	34
66	Daniel Oss	Italy	BMC Racing Team	26	140
67	Taylor Phinney†	United States	BMC Racing Team	22	DNF-16
68	Ivan Santaromita	Italy	BMC Racing Team	29	30
69	Danilo Wyss	Switzerland	BMC Racing Team	27	84
71	Damiano Caruso	Italy	Cannondale	25	19
72	Tiziano Dall'Antonia	Italy	Cannondale	29	113
73	Paolo Longo Borghini	Italy	Cannondale	32	67
74	Alan Marangoni	Italy	Cannondale	28	114
75	Fabio Sabatini	Italy	Cannondale	28	93
76	Cristiano Salerno	Italy	Cannondale	28	86
77	Cayetano Sarmiento	Colombia	Cannondale	26	91
78	Elia Viviani†	Italy	Cannondale	24	119
79	Cameron Wurf	Australia	Cannondale	29	128
81	Darwin Atapuma†	Colombia	Colombia	25	18
82	Edwin Ávila†	Colombia	Colombia	23	164
83	Robinson Chalapud	Colombia	Colombia	29	94
84	Fabio Duarte	Colombia	Colombia	26	28
85	Leonardo Duque	Colombia	Colombia	33	79
86	Wilson Marentes	Colombia	Colombia	27	162
87	Dalivier Ospina	Colombia	Colombia	27	DNF–12
88	Jarlinson Pantano†	Colombia	Colombia	24	46
89	Carlos Quintero	Colombia	Colombia	27	DNF-10
91	Samuel Sánchez	Spain	Euskaltel–Euskadi	35	12
92	Jorge Azanza	Spain	Euskaltel–Euskadi	30	33
93	Egoi Martínez	Spain	Euskaltel–Euskadi	34	22
94	Ricardo Mestre	Portugal	Euskaltel–Euskadi	29	145
95	Miguel Minguez†	Spain	Euskaltel–Euskadi	24	166
96	Ioannis Tamouridis	Greece	Euskaltel–Euskadi	32	152
97	Pablo Urtasun	Spain	Euskaltel–Euskadi	33	DNF-5
98	Gorka Verdugo	Spain	Euskaltel–Euskadi	34	64
99	Robert Vrečer	Slovenia	Euskaltel–Euskadi	32	92
100	Nacer Bouhanni†	France	FDJ	22	DNS-13
101	Sandy Casar	France	FDJ	34	DNS-4
102	Murilo Fischer	Brazil	FDJ	33	147
103	Arnold Jeannesson	France	FDJ	27	DNF-9
104	Johan Le Bon†	France	FDJ	22	115
105	Francis Mourey	France	FDJ	32	20
106	Laurent Pichon	France	FDJ	26	163
107	Dominique Rollin	Canada	FDJ	30	75
109	Anthony Roux	France	FDJ	26	DNF-16
111	Luca Paolini	Italy	Team Katusha	36	59
112	Maxim Belkov	Russia	Team Katusha	28	HD-18
113	Pavel Brutt	Russia	Team Katusha	31	103
114	Giampaolo Caruso	Italy	Team Katusha	32	41
115	Vladimir Gusev	Russia	Team Katusha	30	65
116	Petr Ignatenko	Russia	Team Katusha	25	40
117	Dmitry Kozonchuk	Russia	Team Katusha	29	DNF-16
118	Yuri Trofimov	Russia	Team Katusha	29	13
119	Ángel Vicioso	Spain	Team Katusha	36	DNS-10
121	Michele Scarponi	Italy	Lampre–Merida	33	4
122	Mattia Cattaneo†	Italy	Lampre–Merida	22	DNF-7
123	Kristijan Đurasek	Croatia	Lampre–Merida	25	68
124	Roberto Ferrari	Italy	Lampre–Merida	30	150
125	Przemysław Niemiec	Poland	Lampre–Merida	33	6
126	Daniele Pietropolli	Italy	Lampre–Merida	32	80
127	Filippo Pozzato	Italy	Lampre–Merida	31	120
128	José Serpa	Colombia	Lampre–Merida	34	27
129	Simone Stortoni	Italy	Lampre–Merida	27	56
131	Lars Bak	Denmark	Lotto–Belisol	33	95
132	Dirk Bellemakers	Netherlands	Lotto–Belisol	29	111
133	Brian Bulgac†	Netherlands	Lotto–Belisol	25	135
134	Francis De Greef	Belgium	Lotto–Belisol	28	21
135	Kenny Dehaes	Belgium	Lotto–Belisol	28	156
136	Gert Dockx†	Belgium	Lotto–Belisol	24	104
137	Adam Hansen	Australia	Lotto–Belisol	31	72
138	Vicente Reynès	Spain	Lotto–Belisol	31	109
139	Frederik Willems	Belgium	Lotto–Belisol	33	117
141	Eros Capecchi	Italy	Movistar Team	26	70
142	Juan José Cobo	Spain	Movistar Team	32	116
143	Alex Dowsett†	Great Britain	Movistar Team	24	148
144	José Herrada	Spain	Movistar Team	27	24
145	Beñat Intxausti	Spain	Movistar Team	27	8
146	Vladimir Karpets	Russia	Movistar Team	32	47
147	Pablo Lastras	Spain	Movistar Team	37	85
148	Francisco Ventoso	Spain	Movistar Team	30	66
149	Giovanni Visconti	Italy	Movistar Team	30	35
151	Mark Cavendish	Great Britain	Omega Pharma–Quick-Step	27	127
152	Gianluca Brambilla	Italy	Omega Pharma–Quick-Step	25	105
153	Michał Gołaś	Poland	Omega Pharma–Quick-Step	28	62
154	Iljo Keisse	Belgium	Omega Pharma–Quick-Step	30	159
155	Serge Pauwels	Belgium	Omega Pharma–Quick-Step	29	77
156	Jérôme Pineau	France	Omega Pharma–Quick-Step	33	124
157	Gert Steegmans	Belgium	Omega Pharma–Quick-Step	32	DNS-14
158	Matteo Trentin†	Italy	Omega Pharma–Quick-Step	23	118
159	Julien Vermote†	Belgium	Omega Pharma–Quick-Step	23	132
161	Matthew Goss	Australia	Orica–GreenEDGE	26	DNF-16
162	Luke Durbridge†	Australia	Orica–GreenEDGE	22	142
163	Leigh Howard†	Australia	Orica–GreenEDGE	23	DNS-7
164	Jens Keukeleire†	Belgium	Orica–GreenEDGE	24	74
165	Brett Lancaster	Australia	Orica–GreenEDGE	33	121
166	Christian Meier	Canada	Orica–GreenEDGE	27	143
167	Jens Mouris	Netherlands	Orica–GreenEDGE	33	160
168	Svein Tuft	Canada	Orica–GreenEDGE	35	154
169	Pieter Weening	Netherlands	Orica–GreenEDGE	32	38
171	George Bennett†	New Zealand	RadioShack–Leopard	23	122
172	Danilo Hondo	Germany	RadioShack–Leopard	39	96
173	Robert Kišerlovski	Croatia	RadioShack–Leopard	26	15
174	Tiago Machado	Portugal	RadioShack–Leopard	27	36
175	Giacomo Nizzolo†	Italy	RadioShack–Leopard	24	130
176	Nelson Oliveira†	Portugal	RadioShack–Leopard	24	81
177	Yaroslav Popovych	Ukraine	RadioShack–Leopard	33	133
178	Hayden Roulston	New Zealand	RadioShack–Leopard	32	DNS-17
179	Jesse Sergent†	New Zealand	RadioShack–Leopard	24	153
181	Bradley Wiggins	Great Britain	Team Sky	33	DNS-13
182	Dario Cataldo	Italy	Team Sky	28	57
183	Sergio Henao	Colombia	Team Sky	25	16
184	Christian Knees	Germany	Team Sky	32	60
185	Danny Pate	United States	Team Sky	34	134
186	Salvatore Puccio†	Italy	Team Sky	23	73
187	Kanstantsin Sivtsov	Belarus	Team Sky	30	37
188	Rigoberto Urán	Colombia	Team Sky	26	2
189	Xabier Zandio	Spain	Team Sky	36	82
191	John Degenkolb†	Germany	Argos–Shimano	24	DNS-10
192	Thomas Damuseau†	France	Argos–Shimano	24	53
193	Bert De Backer	Belgium	Argos–Shimano	29	157
194	Koen de Kort	Netherlands	Argos–Shimano	30	78
195	Patrick Gretsch	Germany	Argos–Shimano	26	69
196	Ji Cheng	China	Argos–Shimano	25	DNS–6
197	Tobias Ludvigsson†	Sweden	Argos–Shimano	22	112
198	Luka Mezgec†	Slovenia	Argos–Shimano	24	123
199	Albert Timmer	Netherlands	Argos–Shimano	27	129
201	Rafał Majka†	Poland	Saxo–Tinkoff	23	7
202	Daniele Bennati	Italy	Saxo–Tinkoff	32	DNS-14
203	Manuele Boaro	Italy	Saxo–Tinkoff	26	100
204	Matti Breschel	Denmark	Saxo–Tinkoff	28	DNS–12
205	Mads Christensen	Denmark	Saxo–Tinkoff	29	126
206	Karsten Kroon	Netherlands	Saxo–Tinkoff	37	DNS-14
207	Evgeni Petrov	Russia	Saxo–Tinkoff	34	25
208	Bruno Pires	Portugal	Saxo–Tinkoff	31	61
209	Rory Sutherland	Australia	Saxo–Tinkoff	31	97
211	Marco Marcato	Italy	Vacansoleil–DCM	29	76
212	Grega Bole	Slovenia	Vacansoleil–DCM	27	DNF-20
213	Martijn Keizer†	Netherlands	Vacansoleil–DCM	25	101
214	Maurits Lammertink†	Netherlands	Vacansoleil–DCM	22	155
215	Pim Ligthart†	Netherlands	Vacansoleil–DCM	24	161
216	Rob Ruijgh	Netherlands	Vacansoleil–DCM	26	54
217	Rafael Valls	Spain	Vacansoleil–DCM	25	29
218	Frederik Veuchelen	Belgium	Vacansoleil–DCM	34	83
219	Willem Wauters†	Belgium	Vacansoleil–DCM	23	158
221	Stefano Garzelli	Italy	Vini Fantini–Selle Italia	39	108
222	Rafael Andriato	Brazil	Vini Fantini–Selle Italia	25	165
223	Francesco Chicchi	Italy	Vini Fantini–Selle Italia	32	DNS-9
224	Danilo Di Luca	Italy	Vini Fantini–Selle Italia	37	DNS-20
225	Oscar Gatto	Italy	Vini Fantini–Selle Italia	28	98
226	Alessandro Proni	Italy	Vini Fantini–Selle Italia	30	88
227	Matteo Rabottini	Italy	Vini Fantini–Selle Italia	25	55
228	Mauro Santambrogio	Italy	Vini Fantini–Selle Italia	28	9
229	Fabio Taborre	Italy	Vini Fantini–Selle Italia	27	DNF-10

== By nationality ==
Country	No. of riders	Finishers	Stage wins
Australia	10	6	1 (Adam Hansen x1)
Belarus	1	1	
Belgium	14	11	
Brazil	2	2	
Canada	4	3	
China	1	0	
Colombia	15	13	1 (Rigoberto Urán x1)
Croatia	2	2	
Denmark	3	2	
Estonia	1	1	
France	13	7	
Germany	5	4	1 (John Degenkolb x1)
Greece	1	1	
Italy	58	50	7 (Luca Paolini x1, Enrico Battaglin x1, Mauro Santambrogio x1, Giovanni Visconti x2, Vincenzo Nibali x2)
Kazakhstan	2	2	
Lithuania	1	1	1 (Ramūnas Navardauskas x1)
Luxembourg	1	1	
Netherlands	17	15	
New Zealand	3	2	
Poland	3	3	
Portugal	4	4	
Russia	8	6	1 (Maxim Belkov x1)
Slovenia	3	2	
South Africa	1	1	
Spain	16	14	1 (Beñat Intxausti x1)
Sweden	2	2	
Switzerland	2	2	
Ukraine	1	1	
Great Britain	6	4	6 (Mark Cavendish x5, Alex Dowsett x1)
United States	5	4	
Venezuela	2	1	
TOTAL	207	168	
