= 2012 Tour of Austria =

2012 UCI Europe Tour
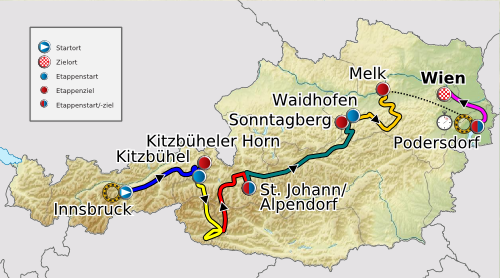
- Map of the Tour of Austria 2012

Race details
- Dates: 1–8 July
- Stages: 8
- Distance: 1,153.90 km (717.0 mi)
- Winning time: 28h 13' 09"

Results
Jersey awarded to the overall winner	Winner	Jakob Fuglsang (Denmark)	(RadioShack–Nissan)
	Second	Steve Morabito (Switzerland)	(BMC Racing Team)
	Third	Robert Vrečer (Slovenia)	(Team Vorarlberg)
Jersey awarded to the points classification winner	Points	Alessandro Bazzana (Italy)	(Team Type 1–Sanofi)
Jersey awarded to the mountains classification winner	Mountains	Georg Preidler (Austria)	(Team Type 1–Sanofi)
Jersey awarded to the youth classification winner	Youth	Angelo Pagani (Italy)	(Colnago–CSF Bardiani)
	Team	(Luxembourg) RadioShack–Nissan	

The 2012 Tour of Austria (German: 2012 Internationale Österreich Rundfahrt) was the 64th edition of the Tour of Austria, an annual bicycle race. Departing from Innsbruck on July 1, it concluded in Vienna on July 8. The 1153.9 km-long stage race was part of the 2012 UCI Europe Tour, and was rated as a 2.HC event. The winner was the Dane Jakob Fuglsang of the RadioShack–Nissan squad.

== Teams ==
18 teams were invited to participate in the tour: 6 UCI ProTeams, 8 UCI Professional Continental Teams and 4 UCI Continental Teams.

UCI ProTeams
- Omega Pharma–Quick-Step
- Movistar Team
- BMC Racing Team
- Team Katusha
- RadioShack–Nissan
- Astana
UCI Professional Continental Teams
- Team NetApp
- Bretagne–Schuller
- Cofidis
- Acqua & Sapone
- Colnago–CSF Bardiani
- Team Type 1–Sanofi
- Farnese Vini–Selle Italia
- UnitedHealthcare
UCI Continental Teams
- Team Vorarlberg
- RC Arbö–Wels–Gourmetfein
- Tirol Cycling Team
- WSA-Viperbike

== Stages ==
=== Stage 1 ===
1 July 2012 – Innsbruck to Innsbruck, 153.0 km (95.1 mi)

Stage 1 Result

	Rider	Team	Time
1	Alessandro Bazzana (ITA)	Team Type 1–Sanofi	3h 54' 48"
2	Francesco Gavazzi (ITA)	Astana	s.t.
3	Marco Canola (ITA)	Colnago–CSF Bardiani	s.t.
4	Georg Preidler (AUT)	Team Type 1–Sanofi	s.t.
5	Maxime Vantomme (BEL)	Team Katusha	s.t.
6	Fabio Taborre (ITA)	Acqua & Sapone	s.t.
7	Danilo Wyss (SUI)	BMC Racing Team	s.t.
8	Jakob Fuglsang (DEN)	RadioShack–Nissan	s.t.
9	Nico Sijmens (BEL)	Cofidis	s.t.
10	Marco Bandiera (ITA)	Omega Pharma–Quick-Step	s.t.

General Classification after Stage 1

	Rider	Team	Time
1	Alessandro Bazzana (ITA)	Team Type 1–Sanofi	3h 54' 38"
2	Francesco Gavazzi (ITA)	Astana	+ 4"
3	Marco Canola (ITA)	Colnago–CSF Bardiani	+ 6"
4	Georg Preidler (AUT)	Team Type 1–Sanofi	+ 10"
5	Maxime Vantomme (BEL)	Team Katusha	s.t.
6	Fabio Taborre (ITA)	Acqua & Sapone	s.t.
7	Danilo Wyss (SUI)	BMC Racing Team	s.t.
8	Jakob Fuglsang (DEN)	RadioShack–Nissan	s.t.
9	Nico Sijmens (BEL)	Cofidis	s.t.
10	Marco Bandiera (ITA)	Omega Pharma–Quick-Step	s.t.

=== Stage 2 ===
2 July 2012 – Innsbruck to Kitzbüheler Horn, 157.4 km (97.8 mi)

Stage 2 Result

	Rider	Team	Time
1	Danilo Di Luca (ITA)	Acqua & Sapone	3h 50' 50"
2	Steve Morabito (SUI)	BMC Racing Team	+ 7"
3	Thomas Rohregger (AUT)	RadioShack–Nissan	+ 10"
4	Petr Ignatenko (RUS)	Team Katusha	+ 21"
5	Alexsandr Dyachenko (KAZ)	Astana	+ 23"
6	Robert Vrečer (SLO)	Team Vorarlberg	+ 27"
7	Sergio Pardilla (ESP)	Movistar Team	+ 40"
8	Angelo Pagani (ITA)	Colnago–CSF Bardiani	+ 50"
9	Marco Pinotti (ITA)	BMC Racing Team	+ 59"
10	Marcel Wyss (SUI)	Team NetApp	+ 1' 17"

General Classification after Stage 2

	Rider	Team	Time
1	Danilo Di Luca (ITA)	Acqua & Sapone	7h 45' 28"
2	Steve Morabito (SUI)	BMC Racing Team	+ 11"
3	Thomas Rohregger (AUT)	RadioShack–Nissan	+ 16"
4	Petr Ignatenko (RUS)	Team Katusha	+ 31"
5	Robert Vrečer (SLO)	Team Vorarlberg	+ 37"
6	Alexsandr Dyachenko (KAZ)	Astana	+ 44"
7	Sergio Pardilla (ESP)	Movistar Team	+ 50"
8	Angelo Pagani (ITA)	Colnago–CSF Bardiani	+ 1' 00"
9	Marco Pinotti (ITA)	BMC Racing Team	+ 1' 09"
10	Marcel Wyss (SUI)	Team NetApp	+ 1' 27"

=== Stage 3 ===
3 July 2012 – Kitzbühel to Lienz, 141.8 km (88.1 mi)

Stage 3 Result

	Rider	Team	Time
1	Sacha Modolo (ITA)	Colnago–CSF Bardiani	3h 29' 22"
2	Daniel Schorn (AUT)	Team NetApp	s.t.
3	Francesco Gavazzi (ITA)	Astana	s.t.
4	Daniele Colli (ITA)	Team Type 1–Sanofi	s.t.
5	Alessandro Bazzana (ITA)	Team Type 1–Sanofi	s.t.
6	Danilo Wyss (SUI)	BMC Racing Team	s.t.
7	Pierpaolo De Negri (ITA)	Farnese Vini–Selle Italia	s.t.
8	Maxime Vantomme (BEL)	Team Katusha	s.t.
9	José Herrada (ESP)	Movistar Team	s.t.
10	Jure Kocjan (SLO)	Team Type 1–Sanofi	s.t.

General Classification after Stage 3

	Rider	Team	Time
1	Danilo Di Luca (ITA)	Acqua & Sapone	11h 14' 50"
2	Steve Morabito (SUI)	BMC Racing Team	+ 11"
3	Thomas Rohregger (AUT)	RadioShack–Nissan	+ 16"
4	Petr Ignatenko (RUS)	Team Katusha	+ 31"
5	Robert Vrečer (SLO)	Team Vorarlberg	+ 37"
6	Alexsandr Dyachenko (KAZ)	Astana	+ 44"
7	Sergio Pardilla (ESP)	Movistar Team	+ 50"
8	Angelo Pagani (ITA)	Colnago–CSF Bardiani	+ 1' 00"
9	Marco Pinotti (ITA)	BMC Racing Team	+ 1' 09"
10	Marcel Wyss (SUI)	Team NetApp	+ 1' 27"

=== Stage 4 ===
4 July 2012 – Lienz to Sankt Johann im Pongau/Alpendorf, 141.3 km (87.8 mi)

Stage 4 Result

	Rider	Team	Time
1	Jakob Fuglsang (DEN)	RadioShack–Nissan	3h 52' 37"
2	Leopold König (CZE)	Team NetApp	+ 1' 14"
3	Robert Vrečer (SLO)	Team Vorarlberg	+ 2' 35"
4	Petr Ignatenko (RUS)	Team Katusha	+ 2' 47"
5	Marcel Wyss (SUI)	Team NetApp	+ 2' 47"
6	Danilo Di Luca (ITA)	Acqua & Sapone	+ 2' 47"
7	Steve Morabito (SUI)	BMC Racing Team	+ 2' 47"
8	Yannick Eijssen (BEL)	BMC Racing Team	+ 2' 47"
9	David Arroyo (ESP)	Movistar Team	+ 2' 51"
10	Rubens Bertogliati (SUI)	Team Type 1–Sanofi	+ 2' 51"

General Classification after Stage 4

	Rider	Team	Time
1	Jakob Fuglsang (DEN)	RadioShack–Nissan	15h 09' 02"
2	Danilo Di Luca (ITA)	Acqua & Sapone	+ 1' 12"
3	Steve Morabito (SUI)	BMC Racing Team	+ 1' 21"
4	Robert Vrečer (SLO)	Team Vorarlberg	+ 1' 28"
5	Thomas Rohregger (AUT)	RadioShack–Nissan	+ 1' 31"
6	Petr Ignatenko (RUS)	Team Katusha	+ 1' 43"
7	Alexsandr Dyachenko (KAZ)	Astana	+ 2' 02"
8	Sergio Pardilla (ESP)	Movistar Team	+ 2' 08"
9	Angelo Pagani (ITA)	Colnago–CSF Bardiani	+ 2' 24"
10	Marcel Wyss (SUI)	Team NetApp	+ 2' 39"

=== Stage 5 ===
5 July 2012 – Sankt Johann im Pongau/Alpendorf to Sonntagberg, 228.3 km (141.9 mi)

Stage 5 Result

	Rider	Team	Time
1	Fabio Taborre (ITA)	Acqua & Sapone	5h 23' 38"
2	Marco Bandiera (ITA)	Omega Pharma–Quick-Step	+ 5"
3	Matthias Brändle (AUT)	Team NetApp	+ 5"
4	Kristof Vandewalle (BEL)	Omega Pharma–Quick-Step	+ 5"
5	Benjamin Day (AUS)	UnitedHealthcare	+ 7"
6	Maxim Belkov (RUS)	Team Katusha	+ 14"
7	Nico Sijmens (BEL)	Cofidis	+ 31"
8	Geoffroy Lequatre (FRA)	Bretagne–Schuller	+ 32"
9	Assan Bazayev (KAZ)	Astana	+ 49"
10	Diego Caccia (ITA)	Farnese Vini–Selle Italia	+ 1' 04"

General Classification after Stage 5

	Rider	Team	Time
1	Jakob Fuglsang (DEN)	RadioShack–Nissan	20h 42' 05"
2	Danilo Di Luca (ITA)	Acqua & Sapone	+ 1' 04"
3	Steve Morabito (SUI)	BMC Racing Team	+ 1' 16"
4	Thomas Rohregger (AUT)	RadioShack–Nissan	+ 1' 48"
5	Robert Vrečer (SLO)	Team Vorarlberg	+ 1' 51"
6	Sergio Pardilla (ESP)	Movistar Team	+ 1' 53"
7	Petr Ignatenko (RUS)	Team Katusha	+ 1' 53"
8	Alexsandr Dyachenko (KAZ)	Astana	+ 2' 16"
9	Marcel Wyss (SUI)	Team NetApp	+ 2' 39"
10	Angelo Pagani (ITA)	Colnago–CSF Bardiani	+ 2' 41"

=== Stage 6 ===
6 July 2012 – Waidhofen an der Ybbs to Melk, 185.2 km (115.1 mi)

Stage 6 Result

	Rider	Team	Time
1	Sacha Modolo (ITA)	Colnago–CSF Bardiani	4h 32' 12"
2	Daniele Colli (ITA)	Team Type 1–Sanofi	s.t.
3	Danilo Napolitano (ITA)	Acqua & Sapone	s.t.
4	Jacopo Guarnieri (ITA)	Astana	s.t.
5	Marco Haller (AUT)	Team Katusha	s.t.
6	Nico Sijmens (BEL)	Cofidis	s.t.
7	Alessandro Bazzana (ITA)	Team Type 1–Sanofi	s.t.
8	Giovanni Visconti (ITA)	Movistar Team	s.t.
9	Pierpaolo De Negri (ITA)	Farnese Vini–Selle Italia	s.t.
10	Sergio Pardilla (ESP)	Movistar Team	s.t.

General Classification after Stage 6

	Rider	Team	Time
1	Jakob Fuglsang (DEN)	RadioShack–Nissan	25h 14' 17"
2	Danilo Di Luca (ITA)	Acqua & Sapone	+ 1' 04"
3	Steve Morabito (SUI)	BMC Racing Team	+ 1' 16"
4	Thomas Rohregger (AUT)	RadioShack–Nissan	+ 1' 48"
5	Robert Vrečer (SLO)	Team Vorarlberg	+ 1' 51"
6	Sergio Pardilla (ESP)	Movistar Team	+ 1' 53"
7	Petr Ignatenko (RUS)	Team Katusha	+ 1' 53"
8	Alexsandr Dyachenko (KAZ)	Astana	+ 2' 16"
9	Marcel Wyss (SUI)	Team NetApp	+ 2' 39"
10	Angelo Pagani (ITA)	Colnago–CSF Bardiani	+ 2' 41"

=== Stage 7 ===
7 July 2012 – Podersdorf am See to Podersdorf am See, 24.1 km (15.0 mi)

Stage 7 Result

	Rider	Team	Time
1	Marco Pinotti (ITA)	BMC Racing Team	27' 42"
2	Kristof Vandewalle (BEL)	Omega Pharma–Quick-Step	+ 32"
3	František Raboň (CZE)	Omega Pharma–Quick-Step	+ 52"
4	Pavel Brutt (RUS)	Team Katusha	+ 53"
5	Jan Bárta (CZE)	Team NetApp	+ 53"
6	Ben King (USA)	RadioShack–Nissan	+ 57"
7	László Bodrogi (FRA)	Team Type 1–Sanofi	+ 57"
8	Markel Irizar (ESP)	RadioShack–Nissan	+ 59"
9	Giovanni Visconti (ITA)	Movistar Team	+ 1' 01"
10	Guillaume Van Keirsbulck (BEL)	Omega Pharma–Quick-Step	+ 1' 09"

General Classification after Stage 7

	Rider	Team	Time
1	Jakob Fuglsang (DEN)	RadioShack–Nissan	25h 43' 15"
2	Steve Morabito (SUI)	BMC Racing Team	+ 1' 24"
3	Robert Vrečer (SLO)	Team Vorarlberg	+ 1' 52"
4	Danilo Di Luca (ITA)	Acqua & Sapone	+ 2' 15"
5	Alexsandr Dyachenko (KAZ)	Astana	+ 2' 16"
6	Marco Pinotti (ITA)	BMC Racing Team	+ 2' 41"
7	Thomas Rohregger (AUT)	RadioShack–Nissan	+ 2' 42"
8	Marcel Wyss (SUI)	Team NetApp	+ 2' 53"
9	Petr Ignatenko (RUS)	Team Katusha	+ 2' 55"
10	Sergio Pardilla (ESP)	Movistar Team	+ 3' 04"

=== Stage 8 ===
8 July 2012 – Podersdorf am See to Vienna, 122.8 km (76.3 mi)

Stage 8 Result

	Rider	Team	Time
1	Daniele Colli (ITA)	Team Type 1–Sanofi	2h 29' 54"
2	Alexei Tsatevich (RUS)	Team Katusha	s.t.
3	Blaž Jarc (SLO)	Team NetApp	s.t.
4	Danilo Napolitano (ITA)	Acqua & Sapone	s.t.
5	Boy Van Poppel (NED)	UnitedHealthcare	s.t.
6	Danilo Wyss (SUI)	BMC Racing Team	s.t.
7	Marco Haller (AUT)	Team Katusha	s.t.
8	Sacha Modolo (ITA)	Colnago–CSF Bardiani	s.t.
9	Guillaume Van Keirsbulck (BEL)	Omega Pharma–Quick-Step	s.t.
10	Jan Sokol (AUT)	RC Arbö–Wels–Gourmetfein	s.t.

General Classification after Stage 8

	Rider	Team	Time
1	Jakob Fuglsang (DEN)	RadioShack–Nissan	28h 13' 09"
2	Steve Morabito (SUI)	BMC Racing Team	+ 1' 24"
3	Robert Vrečer (SLO)	Team Vorarlberg	+ 1' 52"
4	Danilo Di Luca (ITA)	Acqua & Sapone	+ 2' 15"
5	Alexsandr Dyachenko (KAZ)	Astana	+ 2' 16"
6	Marco Pinotti (ITA)	BMC Racing Team	+ 2' 41"
7	Thomas Rohregger (AUT)	RadioShack–Nissan	+ 2' 42"
8	Marcel Wyss (SUI)	Team NetApp	+ 2' 53"
9	Petr Ignatenko (RUS)	Team Katusha	+ 2' 55"
10	Sergio Pardilla (ESP)	Movistar Team	+ 3' 04"

== Classification leadership ==
Stage	Winner	General classification	Points classification	Mountains classification	Young rider classification	Team classification
1	Alessandro Bazzana	Alessandro Bazzana	Alessandro Bazzana	Yohan Bagot	Georg Preidler	RadioShack–Nissan
2	Danilo Di Luca	Danilo Di Luca	Alessandro Bazzana	Danilo Di Luca	Angelo Pagani	RadioShack–Nissan
3	Sacha Modolo	Danilo Di Luca	Alessandro Bazzana	Georg Preidler	Angelo Pagani	RadioShack–Nissan
4	Jakob Fuglsang	Jakob Fuglsang	Alessandro Bazzana	Jakob Fuglsang	Angelo Pagani	RadioShack–Nissan
5	Fabio Taborre	Jakob Fuglsang	Alessandro Bazzana	Jakob Fuglsang	Angelo Pagani	RadioShack–Nissan
6	Sacha Modolo	Jakob Fuglsang	Alessandro Bazzana	Georg Preidler	Angelo Pagani	RadioShack–Nissan
7	Marco Pinotti	Jakob Fuglsang	Alessandro Bazzana	Georg Preidler	Angelo Pagani	RadioShack–Nissan
8	Daniele Colli	Jakob Fuglsang	Alessandro Bazzana	Georg Preidler	Angelo Pagani	RadioShack–Nissan
Final		Jakob Fuglsang	Alessandro Bazzana	Georg Preidler	Angelo Pagani	RadioShack–Nissan

== Final standings ==
=== General classification ===
	Rider	Team	Time
1	Jakob Fuglsang (DEN)	RadioShack–Nissan	28h 13' 09"
2	Steve Morabito (SUI)	BMC Racing Team	+ 1' 24"
3	Robert Vrečer (SLO)	Team Vorarlberg	+ 1' 52"
4	Danilo Di Luca (ITA)	Acqua & Sapone	+ 2' 15"
5	Alexsandr Dyachenko (KAZ)	Astana	+ 2' 16"
6	Marco Pinotti (ITA)	BMC Racing Team	+ 2' 41"
7	Thomas Rohregger (AUT)	RadioShack–Nissan	+ 2' 42"
8	Marcel Wyss (SUI)	Team NetApp	+ 2' 53"
9	Petr Ignatenko (RUS)	Team Katusha	+ 2' 55"
10	Sergio Pardilla (ESP)	Movistar Team	+ 3' 04"

=== Points classification ===
	Rider	Team	Points
1	Alessandro Bazzana (ITA)	Team Type 1–Sanofi	46
2	Daniele Colli (ITA)	Team Type 1–Sanofi	35
3	Sacha Modolo (ITA)	Colnago–CSF Bardiani	34
4	Jakob Fuglsang (DEN)	RadioShack–Nissan	27
5	Fabio Taborre (ITA)	Acqua & Sapone	22
6	Robert Vrečer (SLO)	Team Vorarlberg	22
7	Danilo Di Luca (ITA)	Acqua & Sapone	21
8	Kristof Vandewalle (BEL)	Omega Pharma–Quick-Step	20
9	Georg Preidler (AUT)	Team Type 1–Sanofi	19
10	Steve Morabito (SUI)	BMC Racing Team	19

=== Mountains classification ===
	Rider	Team	Points
1	Georg Preidler (AUT)	Team Type 1–Sanofi	51
2	Jakob Fuglsang (DEN)	RadioShack–Nissan	33
3	Leopold König (CZE)	Team NetApp	25
4	Markus Eibegger (AUT)	RC Arbö–Wels–Gourmetfein	20
5	Danilo Di Luca (ITA)	Acqua & Sapone	19
6	Thomas Rohregger (AUT)	RadioShack–Nissan	18
7	Beñat Intxausti (ESP)	Movistar Team	16
8	Laurent Didier (LUX)	RadioShack–Nissan	12
9	Steve Morabito (SUI)	BMC Racing Team	11
10	Yohan Bagot (FRA)	Cofidis	9

=== Young rider classification ===
	Rider	Team	Time
1	Angelo Pagani (ITA)	Colnago–CSF Bardiani	28h 16' 53"
2	Carlos Betancur (COL)	Acqua & Sapone	+ 9' 39"
3	Georg Preidler (AUT)	Team Type 1–Sanofi	+ 28' 35"
4	Paul Lang (AUT)	WSA-Viperbike	+ 37' 42"
5	Riccardo Zoidl (AUT)	RC Arbö–Wels–Gourmetfein	+ 39' 00"
6	David Woehrer (AUT)	Tirol Cycling Team	+ 39' 43"
7	Julien Vermote (BEL)	Omega Pharma–Quick-Step	+ 44' 49"
8	Yannick Eijssen (BEL)	BMC Racing Team	+ 45' 24"
9	Andrea Pasqualon (ITA)	Colnago–CSF Bardiani	+ 48' 55"
10	Florian Gaugl (AUT)	Team Vorarlberg	+ 49' 30"

=== Team classification ===
Pos.	Team	Time
1	RadioShack–Nissan	84h 43' 55"
2	Movistar Team	+ 5' 59"
3	BMC Racing Team	+ 16' 38"
4	Team NetApp	+ 32' 53"
5	Acqua & Sapone	+ 37' 06"
6	Team Katusha	+ 59' 10"
7	Team Type 1–Sanofi	+ 1h 05' 10"
8	Astana	+ 1h 10' 38"
9	Tirol Cycling Team	+ 1h 14' 27"
10	Team Vorarlberg	+ 1h 31' 32"
