= 2011 Tour of Austria =

2010–2011 UCI Europe Tour
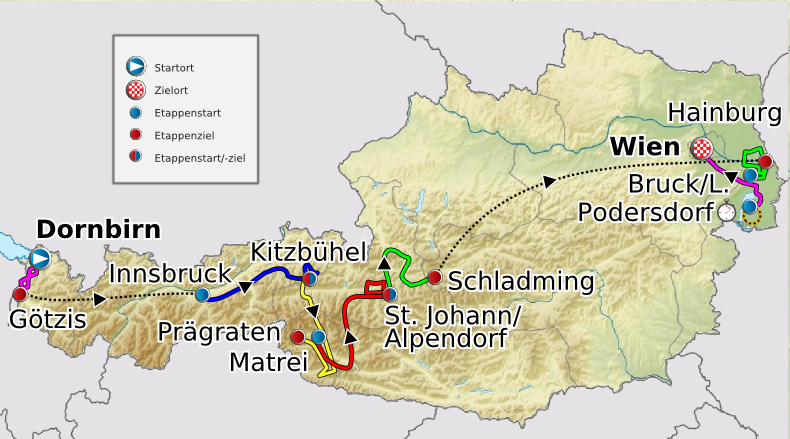
- Route of the 2011 Tour of Austria

Race details
- Dates: 3–10 July
- Stages: 8
- Distance: 1,136.90 km (706.4 mi)
- Winning time: 26h 59' 26"

Results
Jersey awarded to the overall winner	Winner	Fredrik Kessiakoff (Sweden)	(Astana)
	Second	Leopold König (Czech Republic)	(Team NetApp)
	Third	Carlos Sastre (Spain)	(Geox–TMC)
Jersey awarded to the points classification winner	Points	Greg Van Avermaet (Belgium)	(BMC Racing Team)
Jersey awarded to the mountains classification winner	Mountains	Nicolas Edet (France)	(Cofidis)
	Youth	Leopold König (Czech Republic)	(Team NetApp)
	Team	Astana	

The 2011 Tour of Austria (German: 2011 Internationale Österreich Rundfahrt) was the 63rd edition of the Tour of Austria, an annual bicycle race. Departing from Dornbirn on July 3, it concluded in Vienna on July 10. The 1136.9 km long stage race was part of the 2010–2011 UCI Europe Tour, and was rated as a 2.HC event. Fredrik Kessiakoff of Astana won the general classification, his first title, and the first Swede to do so since 1957.

== Teams ==
18 teams were invited to participate in the tour: 8 UCI ProTeams, 6 UCI Professional Continental Teams and 4 UCI Continental Teams.

UCI ProTeams
- Leopard Trek
- HTC–Highroad
- Saxo Bank–SunGard
- Team RadioShack
- BMC Racing Team
- Team Katusha
- Team Sky
- Astana
UCI Professional Continental Teams
- Androni Giocattoli
- Skil–Shimano
- Cofidis
- Geox–TMC
- Farnese Vini–Neri Sottoli
- Team NetApp
UCI Continental Teams
- Arbö–Gebrüder Weiss–Oberndorfer
- Tyrol Team
- WSA-Viperbike Kärnten
- Team Vorarlberg

== Stages ==
=== Stage 1 ===
3 July 2011 – Dornbirn to Götzis, 139.7 km (86.8 mi)

Stage 1 Result

	Rider	Team	Time
1	Robert Hunter (RSA)	Team RadioShack	3h 16' 34"
2	Christopher Sutton (AUS)	Team Sky	s.t.
3	Roberto Ferrari (ITA)	Androni Giocattoli	s.t.
4	Simon Clarke (AUS)	Astana	s.t.
5	Jens Keukeleire (BEL)	Cofidis	s.t.
6	Jonas Aaen Jørgensen (DEN)	Saxo Bank–SunGard	s.t.
7	Robert Wagner (GER)	Leopard Trek	s.t.
8	Roger Kluge (GER)	Skil–Shimano	s.t.
9	René Weissinger (GER)	Team Vorarlberg	s.t.
10	Daniel Schorn (AUT)	Team NetApp	s.t.

General Classification after Stage 1

	Rider	Team	Time
1	Robert Hunter (RSA)	Team RadioShack	3h 16' 24"
2	Christopher Sutton (AUS)	Team Sky	+ 4"
3	Roberto Ferrari (ITA)	Androni Giocattoli	+ 6"
4	Greg Van Avermaet (BEL)	BMC Racing Team	+ 8"
5	Simon Clarke (AUS)	Astana	+ 10"
6	Jens Keukeleire (BEL)	Cofidis	s.t.
7	Jonas Aaen Jørgensen (DEN)	Saxo Bank–SunGard	s.t.
8	Robert Wagner (GER)	Leopard Trek	s.t.
9	Roger Kluge (GER)	Skil–Shimano	s.t.
10	René Weissinger (GER)	Team Vorarlberg	s.t.

=== Stage 2 ===
4 July 2011 – Innsbruck to Kitzbühel, 158.3 km (98.4 mi)

Stage 2 Result

	Rider	Team	Time
1	Fredrik Kessiakoff (SWE)	Astana	3h 50' 11"
2	Mauro Santambrogio (ITA)	BMC Racing Team	+ 1' 14"
3	Leopold König (CZE)	Team NetApp	+ 1' 19"
4	Carlos Sastre (ESP)	Geox–TMC	+ 1' 22"
5	Thomas Rohregger (AUT)	Leopard Trek	+ 1' 38"
6	Chris Butler (USA)	BMC Racing Team	+ 1' 53"
7	Morris Possoni (ITA)	Team Sky	+ 2' 01"
8	Petr Ignatenko (RUS)	Team Katusha	+ 2' 27"
9	Alessandro Bisolti (ITA)	Farnese Vini–Neri Sottoli	+ 2' 39"
10	Oliver Zaugg (SUI)	Leopard Trek	+ 2' 40"

General Classification after Stage 2

	Rider	Team	Time
1	Fredrik Kessiakoff (SWE)	Astana	7h 06' 39"
2	Mauro Santambrogio (ITA)	BMC Racing Team	+ 1' 18"
3	Leopold König (CZE)	Team NetApp	+ 1' 25"
4	Carlos Sastre (ESP)	Geox–TMC	+ 1' 32"
5	Thomas Rohregger (AUT)	Leopard Trek	+ 1' 44"
6	Morris Possoni (ITA)	Team Sky	+ 2' 11"
7	Chris Butler (USA)	BMC Racing Team	+ 2' 13"
8	Petr Ignatenko (RUS)	Team Katusha	+ 2' 37"
9	Alessandro Bisolti (ITA)	Farnese Vini–Neri Sottoli	+ 2' 49"
10	Oliver Zaugg (SUI)	Leopard Trek	+ 2' 50"

=== Stage 3 ===
5 July 2011 – Kitzbühel to Prägraten am Großvenediger, 174.5 km (108.4 mi)

Stage 3 Result

	Rider	Team	Time
1	Jens Keukeleire (BEL)	Cofidis	4h 17' 08"
2	Daryl Impey (RSA)	Team NetApp	s.t.
3	Jonas Aaen Jørgensen (DEN)	Saxo Bank–SunGard	s.t.
4	Greg Van Avermaet (BEL)	BMC Racing Team	s.t.
5	Mauro Santambrogio (ITA)	BMC Racing Team	s.t.
6	Daniele Ratto (ITA)	Geox–TMC	s.t.
7	Geoffroy Lequatre (FRA)	Team RadioShack	s.t.
8	Dmitry Kozonchuk (RUS)	Geox–TMC	s.t.
9	Thierry Hupond (FRA)	Skil–Shimano	s.t.
10	Thomas Rohregger (AUT)	Leopard Trek	s.t.

General Classification after Stage 3

	Rider	Team	Time
1	Fredrik Kessiakoff (SWE)	Astana	11h 23' 47"
2	Mauro Santambrogio (ITA)	BMC Racing Team	+ 1' 18"
3	Leopold König (CZE)	Team NetApp	+ 1' 25"
4	Carlos Sastre (ESP)	Geox–TMC	+ 1' 32"
5	Thomas Rohregger (AUT)	Leopard Trek	+ 1' 44"
6	Morris Possoni (ITA)	Team Sky	+ 2' 11"
7	Chris Butler (USA)	BMC Racing Team	+ 2' 23"
8	Petr Ignatenko (RUS)	Team Katusha	+ 2' 37"
9	Alessandro Bisolti (ITA)	Farnese Vini–Neri Sottoli	+ 2' 49"
10	Denis Menchov (RUS)	Geox–TMC	+ 3' 09"

=== Stage 4 ===
6 July 2011 – Matrei in Osttirol to Sankt Johann im Pongau/Alpendorf, 199.3 km (123.8 mi)

Stage 4 Result

	Rider	Team	Time
1	Alexandre Geniez (FRA)	Skil–Shimano	5h 30' 09"
2	Johannes Fröhlinger (GER)	Skil–Shimano	+ 15"
3	Alexandre Pliuschin (MDA)	Team Katusha	+ 36"
4	Fredrik Kessiakoff (SWE)	Astana	+ 41"
5	Mauro Santambrogio (ITA)	BMC Racing Team	s.t.
6	Daryl Impey (RSA)	Team NetApp	+ 42"
7	Morris Possoni (ITA)	Team Sky	s.t.
8	Leopold König (CZE)	Team NetApp	s.t.
9	Nicolas Edet (FRA)	Cofidis	+ 43"
10	Alessandro Bisolti (ITA)	Farnese Vini–Neri Sottoli	s.t.

General Classification after Stage 4

	Rider	Team	Time
1	Fredrik Kessiakoff (SWE)	Astana	16h 54' 37"
2	Mauro Santambrogio (ITA)	BMC Racing Team	+ 1' 18"
3	Leopold König (CZE)	Team NetApp	+ 1' 26"
4	Carlos Sastre (ESP)	Geox–TMC	+ 1' 34"
5	Thomas Rohregger (AUT)	Leopard Trek	+ 1' 46"
6	Morris Possoni (ITA)	Team Sky	+ 2' 12"
7	Petr Ignatenko (RUS)	Team Katusha	+ 2' 46"
8	Alessandro Bisolti (ITA)	Farnese Vini–Neri Sottoli	+ 2' 51"
9	Denis Menchov (RUS)	Geox–TMC	+ 3' 11"
10	Chris Butler (USA)	BMC Racing Team	+ 3' 17"

=== Stage 5 ===
7 July 2011 – Sankt Johann im Pongau/Alpendorf to Schladming, 157.2 km (97.7 mi)

Stage 5 Result

	Rider	Team	Time
1	Ian Stannard (GBR)	Team Sky	3h 33' 50"
2	Gatis Smukulis (LAT)	HTC–Highroad	s.t.
3	Stefan Denifl (AUT)	Leopard Trek	s.t.
4	Grégory Rast (SUI)	Team RadioShack	s.t.
5	Yannick Eijssen (BEL)	BMC Racing Team	+ 8"
6	Christopher Sutton (AUS)	Team Sky	+ 49"
7	Nikolay Trusov (RUS)	Team Katusha	s.t.
8	Greg Van Avermaet (BEL)	BMC Racing Team	s.t.
9	Roger Kluge (GER)	Skil–Shimano	s.t.
10	Pierpaolo De Negri (ITA)	Farnese Vini–Neri Sottoli	s.t.

General Classification after Stage 5

	Rider	Team	Time
1	Fredrik Kessiakoff (SWE)	Astana	20h 29' 16"
2	Mauro Santambrogio (ITA)	BMC Racing Team	+ 1' 18"
3	Leopold König (CZE)	Team NetApp	+ 1' 26"
4	Carlos Sastre (ESP)	Geox–TMC	+ 1' 34"
5	Thomas Rohregger (AUT)	Leopard Trek	+ 1' 46"
6	Morris Possoni (ITA)	Team Sky	+ 2' 12"
7	Petr Ignatenko (RUS)	Team Katusha	+ 2' 46"
8	Alessandro Bisolti (ITA)	Farnese Vini–Neri Sottoli	+ 2' 51"
9	Denis Menchov (RUS)	Geox–TMC	+ 3' 11"
10	Chris Butler (USA)	BMC Racing Team	+ 3' 17"

=== Stage 6 ===
8 July 2011 – Hainburg an der Donau to Bruck an der Leitha, 155.0 km (96.3 mi)

Stage 6 Result

	Rider	Team	Time
1	Greg Van Avermaet (BEL)	BMC Racing Team	3h 19' 11"
2	Matt Brammeier (IRL)	HTC–Highroad	s.t.
3	Daniele Bennati (ITA)	Leopard Trek	s.t.
4	Pierpaolo De Negri (ITA)	Farnese Vini–Neri Sottoli	s.t.
5	Daniele Ratto (ITA)	Geox–TMC	s.t.
6	Andrey Mizurov (KAZ)	Astana	s.t.
7	Nikolay Trusov (RUS)	Team Katusha	s.t.
8	Aleksejs Saramotins (LAT)	Cofidis	s.t.
9	Jarosław Marycz (POL)	Saxo Bank–SunGard	s.t.
10	Michael Barry (CAN)	Team Sky	+ 3"

General Classification after Stage 6

	Rider	Team	Time
1	Fredrik Kessiakoff (SWE)	Astana	23h 48' 33"
2	Mauro Santambrogio (ITA)	BMC Racing Team	+ 1' 18"
3	Leopold König (CZE)	Team NetApp	+ 1' 26"
4	Carlos Sastre (ESP)	Geox–TMC	+ 1' 34"
5	Thomas Rohregger (AUT)	Leopard Trek	+ 1' 46"
6	Morris Possoni (ITA)	Team Sky	+ 2' 12"
7	Petr Ignatenko (RUS)	Team Katusha	+ 2' 46"
8	Alessandro Bisolti (ITA)	Farnese Vini–Neri Sottoli	+ 2' 51"
9	Denis Menchov (RUS)	Geox–TMC	+ 3' 11"
10	Reto Hollenstein (SUI)	Team Vorarlberg	+ 3' 29"

=== Stage 7 ===
9 July 2011 – Podersdorf am See to Podersdorf am See, 30.1 km (18.7 mi) individual time trial (ITT)

Stage 7 Result

	Rider	Team	Time
1	Bert Grabsch (GER)	HTC–Highroad	34' 37"
2	Jesse Sergent (NZL)	Team RadioShack	+ 23"
3	Patrick Gretsch (GER)	HTC–Highroad	+ 33"
4	Taylor Phinney (USA)	BMC Racing Team	+ 47"
5	Fredrik Kessiakoff (SWE)	Astana	+ 56"
6	Jan Bárta (CZE)	Team NetApp	+ 1' 11"
7	Mads Christensen (DEN)	Saxo Bank–SunGard	+ 1' 12"
8	Tiago Machado (POR)	Team RadioShack	+ 1' 18"
9	Artem Ovechkin (RUS)	Team Katusha	+ 1' 19"
10	Ian Stannard (GBR)	Team Sky	+ 1' 24"

General Classification after Stage 7

	Rider	Team	Time
1	Fredrik Kessiakoff (SWE)	Astana	24h 24' 05"
2	Leopold König (CZE)	Team NetApp	+ 2' 28"
3	Carlos Sastre (ESP)	Geox–TMC	+ 3' 05"
4	Thomas Rohregger (AUT)	Leopard Trek	+ 3' 59"
5	Denis Menchov (RUS)	Geox–TMC	+ 4' 02"
6	Mauro Santambrogio (ITA)	BMC Racing Team	+ 4' 34"
7	Morris Possoni (ITA)	Team Sky	+ 4' 36"
8	Jan Bárta (CZE)	Team NetApp	+ 4' 46"
9	Geoffroy Lequatre (FRA)	Team RadioShack	+ 4' 59"
10	Andrey Mizurov (KAZ)	Astana	+ 5' 09"

=== Stage 8 ===
10 July 2011 – Podersdorf am See to Vienna, 122.8 km (76.3 mi)

Stage 8 Result

	Rider	Team	Time
1	Daniele Bennati (ITA)	Leopard Trek	2h 35' 21"
2	Martin Velits (SVK)	HTC–Highroad	s.t.
3	Roger Kluge (GER)	Skil–Shimano	s.t.
4	Christopher Sutton (AUS)	Team Sky	s.t.
5	René Weissinger (GER)	Team Vorarlberg	s.t.
6	Jens Keukeleire (BEL)	Cofidis	s.t.
7	Michał Kwiatkowski (POL)	Team RadioShack	s.t.
8	Daryl Impey (RSA)	Team NetApp	s.t.
9	Nikolay Trusov (RUS)	Team Katusha	s.t.
10	Jan Ghyselinck (BEL)	HTC–Highroad	s.t.

Final General Classification

	Rider	Team	Time
1	Fredrik Kessiakoff (SWE)	Astana	26h 59' 26"
2	Leopold König (CZE)	Team NetApp	+ 2' 28"
3	Carlos Sastre (ESP)	Geox–TMC	+ 3' 05"
4	Thomas Rohregger (AUT)	Leopard Trek	+ 3' 59"
5	Denis Menchov (RUS)	Geox–TMC	+ 4' 02"
6	Mauro Santambrogio (ITA)	BMC Racing Team	+ 4' 34"
7	Morris Possoni (ITA)	Team Sky	+ 4' 36"
8	Jan Bárta (CZE)	Team NetApp	+ 4' 46"
9	Geoffroy Lequatre (FRA)	Team RadioShack	+ 4' 59"
10	Andrey Mizurov (KAZ)	Astana	+ 5' 09"

== Classification leadership ==
Stage	Winner	General classification	Points classification	Mountains classification	Young rider classification	Team classification
1	Robert Hunter	Robert Hunter	Robert Hunter	Greg Van Avermaet	Jens Keukeleire	HTC–Highroad
2	Fredrik Kessiakoff	Fredrik Kessiakoff	Fredrik Kessiakoff	Greg Van Avermaet	Leopold König	Astana
3	Jens Keukeleire	Fredrik Kessiakoff	Jens Keukeleire	Nicolas Edet	Leopold König	Geox–TMC
4	Alexandre Geniez	Fredrik Kessiakoff	Daryl Impey	Nicolas Edet	Leopold König	Geox–TMC
5	Ian Stannard	Fredrik Kessiakoff	Daryl Impey	Nicolas Edet	Leopold König	Geox–TMC
6	Greg Van Avermaet	Fredrik Kessiakoff	Greg Van Avermaet	Nicolas Edet	Leopold König	Geox–TMC
7	Bert Grabsch	Fredrik Kessiakoff	Greg Van Avermaet	Nicolas Edet	Leopold König	Astana
8	Daniele Bennati	Fredrik Kessiakoff	Greg Van Avermaet	Nicolas Edet	Leopold König	Astana
Final		Fredrik Kessiakoff	Greg Van Avermaet	Nicolas Edet	Leopold König	Astana

== Final standings ==
=== General classification ===
	Rider	Team	Time
1	Fredrik Kessiakoff (SWE)	Astana	26h 59' 26"
2	Leopold König (CZE)	Team NetApp	+ 2' 28"
3	Carlos Sastre (ESP)	Geox–TMC	+ 3' 05"
4	Thomas Rohregger (AUT)	Leopard Trek	+ 3' 59"
5	Denis Menchov (RUS)	Geox–TMC	+ 4' 02"
6	Mauro Santambrogio (ITA)	BMC Racing Team	+ 4' 34"
7	Morris Possoni (ITA)	Team Sky	+ 4' 36"
8	Jan Bárta (CZE)	Team NetApp	+ 4' 46"
9	Geoffroy Lequatre (FRA)	Team RadioShack	+ 4' 59"
10	Andrey Mizurov (KAZ)	Astana	+ 5' 09"

=== Points classification ===
	Rider	Team	Points
1	Greg Van Avermaet (BEL)	BMC Racing Team	43
2	Daryl Impey (RSA)	Team NetApp	32
3	Fredrik Kessiakoff (SWE)	Astana	30
4	Jens Keukeleire (BEL)	Cofidis	28
5	Mauro Santambrogio (ITA)	BMC Racing Team	26
6	Christopher Sutton (AUS)	Team Sky	26
7	Gatis Smukulis (LAT)	HTC–Highroad	22
8	Daniele Bennati (ITA)	Leopard Trek	20
9	Mads Christensen (DEN)	Saxo Bank–SunGard	20
10	Alexandre Geniez (FRA)	Skil–Shimano	18

=== Mountains classification ===
	Rider	Team	Points
1	Nicolas Edet (FRA)	Cofidis	38
2	Alexandre Geniez (FRA)	Skil–Shimano	37
3	Mads Christensen (DEN)	Saxo Bank–SunGard	28
4	Greg Van Avermaet (BEL)	BMC Racing Team	18
5	Johannes Fröhlinger (GER)	Skil–Shimano	17
6	Martin Kohler (SUI)	BMC Racing Team	17
7	Fredrik Kessiakoff (SWE)	Astana	15
8	Gatis Smukulis (LAT)	HTC–Highroad	14
9	David Wöhrer (AUT)	Tyrol Team	14
10	Martin Schöffmann (AUT)	WSA-Viperbike Kärnten	13

=== Young rider classification ===
	Rider	Team	Time
1	Leopold König (CZE)	Team NetApp	27h 01' 54"
2	Petr Ignatenko (RUS)	Team Katusha	+ 3' 23"
3	Stefan Kirchmair (AUT)	Tyrol Team	+ 6' 21"
4	Alexandre Pliuschin (MDA)	Team Katusha	+ 7' 47"
5	Tanel Kangert (EST)	Astana	+ 8' 07"
6	Georg Preidler (AUT)	Tyrol Team	+ 10' 03"
7	Caleb Fairly (USA)	HTC–Highroad	+ 13' 30"
8	Jonathan Monsalve (VEN)	Androni Giocattoli	+ 13' 44"
9	Gatis Smukulis (LAT)	HTC–Highroad	+ 16' 07"
10	Chris Butler (USA)	BMC Racing Team	+ 18' 17"

=== Team classification ===
Pos.	Team	Time
1	Astana	81h 11' 02"
2	Geox–TMC	+ 6"
3	BMC Racing Team	+ 4' 05"
4	Team NetApp	+ 4' 19"
5	Team RadioShack	+ 9' 37"
6	Team Sky	+ 10' 06"
7	Leopard Trek	+ 11' 41"
8	Tyrol Team	+ 13' 19"
9	Team Katusha	+ 16' 52"
10	Skil–Shimano	+ 17' 20"
