= 2015 Dubai Tour =

2015 UCI Asia Tour
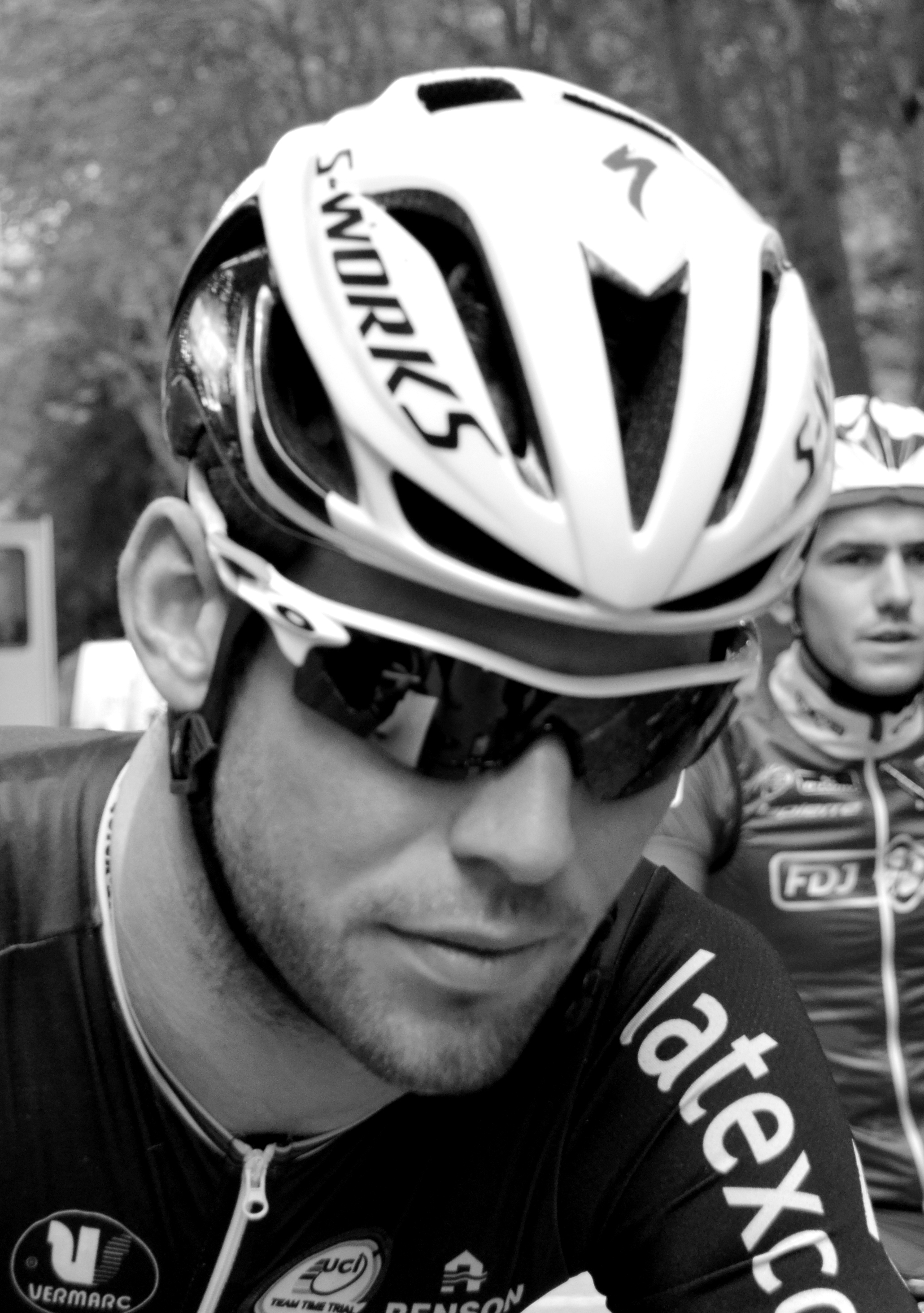
- Mark Cavendish, overall winner of the 2015 Dubai Tour

Race details
- Dates: 4–7 February 2015
- Stages: 4
- Distance: 660 km (410.1 mi)
- Winning time: 15h 22' 38"

Results
Jersey awarded to the overall winner	Winner	Mark Cavendish (GBR)	(Etixx–Quick-Step)
	Second	John Degenkolb (GER)	(Team Giant–Alpecin)
	Third	Juan José Lobato (ESP)	(Movistar Team)
Jersey awarded to the points classification winner	Points	Mark Cavendish (GBR)	(Etixx–Quick-Step)
Jersey awarded to the youth classification winner	Youth	Michael Valgren (DEN)	(Tinkoff–Saxo)
	Sprints	Alessandro Bazzana (ITA)	(UnitedHealthcare)
Jersey awarded to the team classification winner	Team	BMC Racing Team	

The 2015 Dubai Tour was a four-stage men's professional road cycling race. It was the second running of the Dubai Tour; it started on 4 February at Dubai International Marine Club and finished on 7 February at the Burj Khalifa. The race was part of the 2015 UCI Asia Tour, and was categorised by the UCI as a 2.HC race.

== Teams ==
Sixteen teams were selected to take part in the race, including 10 World Tour teams:

- AG2R La Mondiale
- Astana
- Bardiani–CSF
- BMC Racing Team
- CCC–Sprandi–Polkowice
- Etixx–Quick-Step
- Lampre–Merida
- Movistar Team
- Skydive Dubai–Al Ahli
- Team Giant–Alpecin
- Team Katusha
- Team Novo Nordisk
- Team Sky
- Tinkoff–Saxo
- United Arab Emirates
- UnitedHealthcare

== Race overview ==
The race was composed of four stages: three were classified as flat stages and one as a medium-mountain stage.

List of stages
Stage	Date	Course	Distance	Type	Winner
1	4 February	Dubai International Marine Club to Union House Flag	145 km (90 mi)	Flat stage	Mark Cavendish (GBR)
2	5 February	Dubai International Marine Club to Palm Jumeirah	187 km (116 mi)	Flat stage	Elia Viviani (ITA)
3	6 February	Dubai International Marine Club to Hatta Dam	205 km (127 mi)	Medium-mountain stage	John Degenkolb (GER)
4	7 February	Dubai International Marine Club to Burj Khalifa	123 km (76 mi)	Flat stage	Mark Cavendish (GBR)

== Stages ==
=== Stage 1 ===
4 February 2015 — Dubai International Marine Club to Union House Flag, 145 km (90 mi)

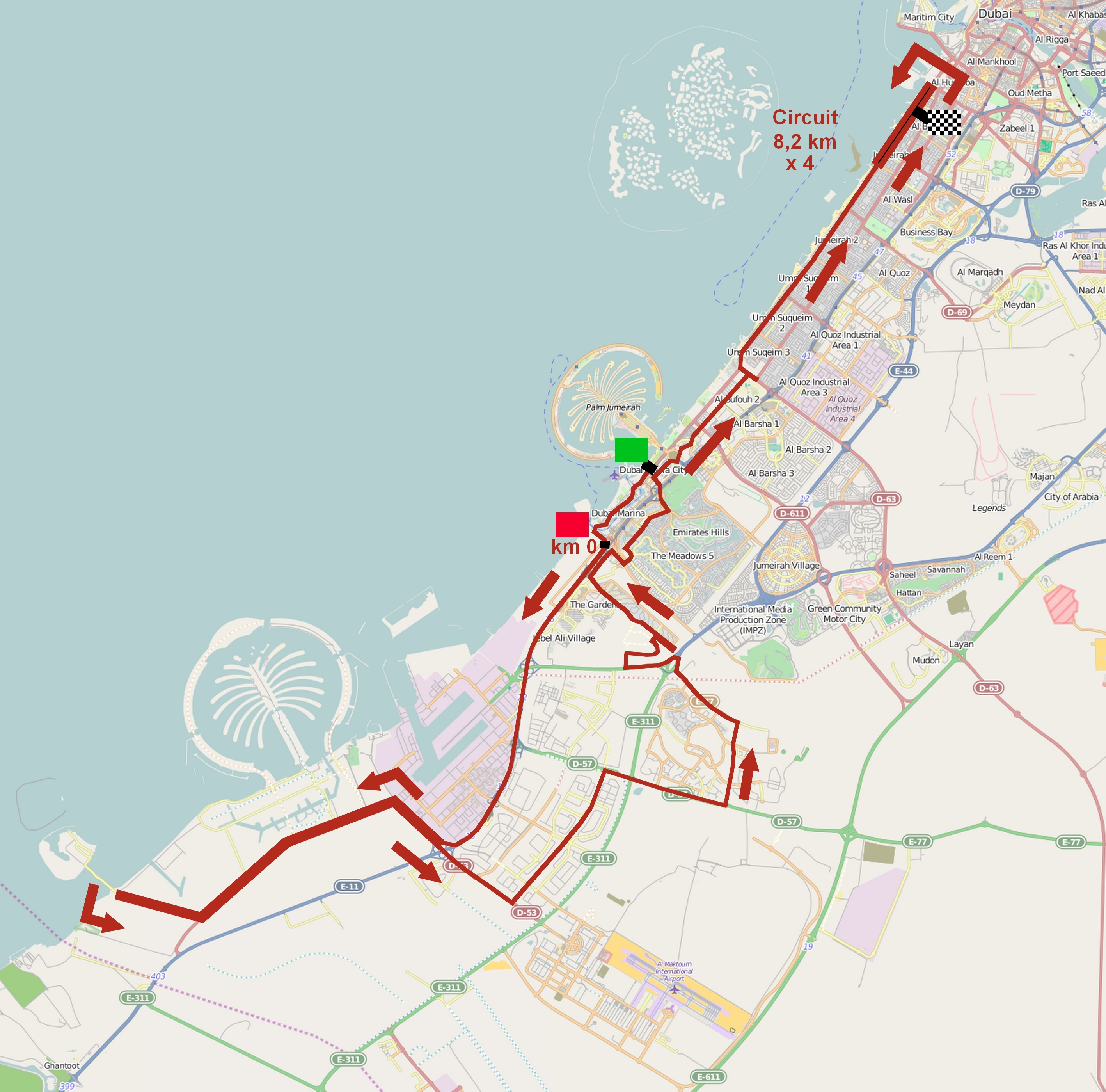
The route of stage one

Stage 1 result
Rank	Rider	Team	Time
1	Mark Cavendish (GBR)	Etixx–Quick-Step	3h 25' 00"
2	Andrea Guardini (ITA)	Astana	+ 0"
3	Elia Viviani (ITA)	Team Sky	+ 0"
4	Alexander Porsev (RUS)	Team Katusha	+ 0"
5	Juan José Lobato (ESP)	Movistar Team	+ 0"
6	Luka Mezgec (SLO)	Team Giant–Alpecin	+ 0"
7	Andrea Palini (ITA)	Skydive Dubai–Al Ahli	+ 0"
8	Paolo Simion (ITA)	Bardiani–CSF	+ 0"
9	Daniel Oss (ITA)	BMC Racing Team	+ 0"
10	Martijn Verschoor (NED)	Team Novo Nordisk	+ 0"

General classification after stage 1
Rank	Rider	Team	Time
1	Mark Cavendish (GBR)	Etixx–Quick-Step	3h 24' 50"
2	Andrea Guardini (ITA)	Astana	+ 4"
3	Elia Viviani (ITA)	Team Sky	+ 6"
4	Ben Swift (GBR)	Team Sky	+ 7"
5	Alessandro Bazzana (ITA)	UnitedHealthcare	+ 7"
6	Manuele Boaro (ITA)	Tinkoff–Saxo	+ 8"
7	Enrico Battaglin (ITA)	Bardiani–CSF	+ 8"
8	Rafael Valls (ESP)	Lampre–Merida	+ 9"
9	Alexander Porsev (RUS)	Team Katusha	+ 10"
10	Juan José Lobato (ESP)	Movistar Team	+ 10"

=== Stage 2 ===
5 February 2015 — Dubai International Marine Club to Palm Jumeirah, 187 km (116 mi)

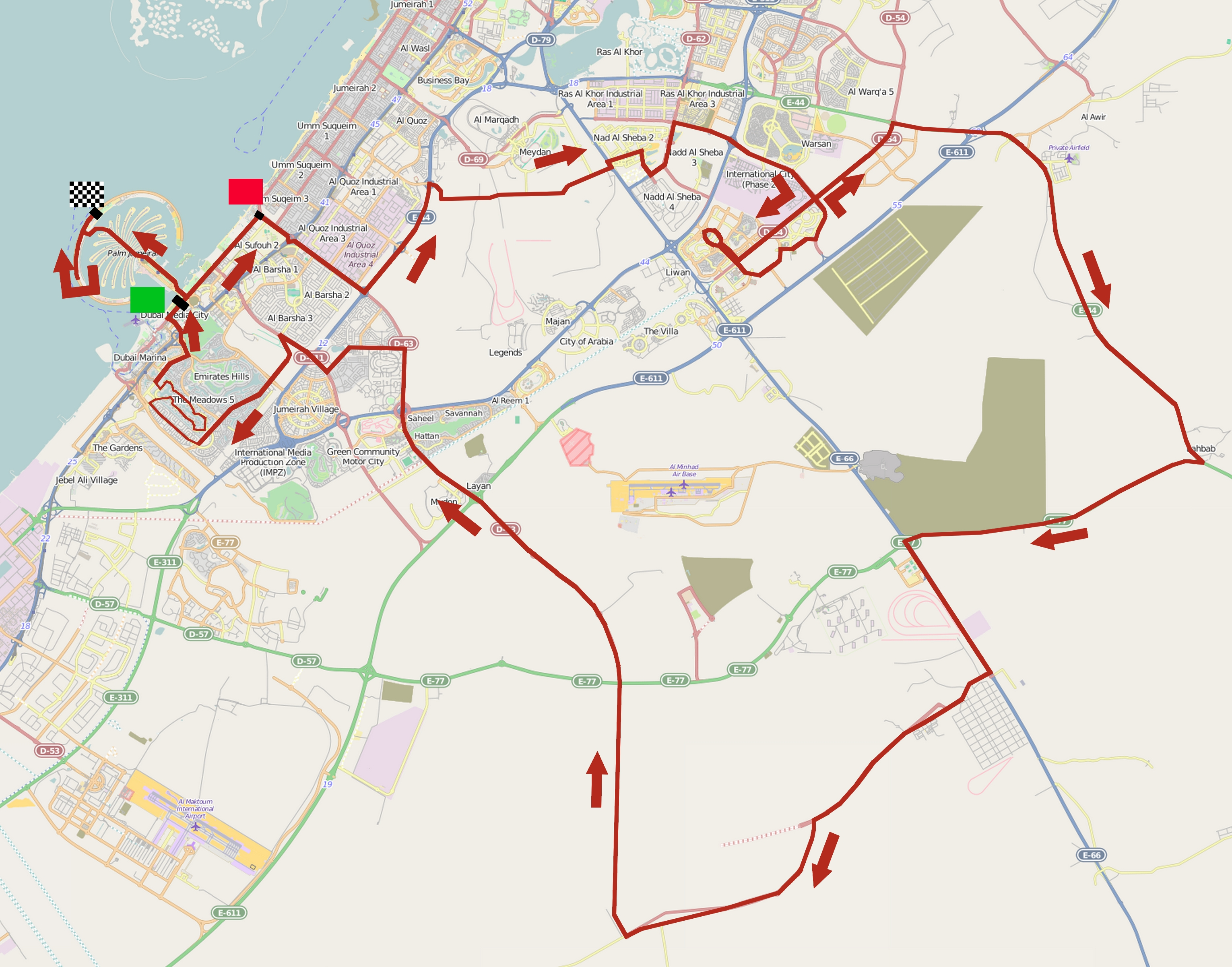
The route of stage two

Stage 2 result
Rank	Rider	Team	Time
1	Elia Viviani (ITA)	Team Sky	4h 29' 59"
2	Mark Cavendish (GBR)	Etixx–Quick-Step	+ 0"
3	Andrea Guardini (ITA)	Astana	+ 0"
4	Alexander Porsev (RUS)	Team Katusha	+ 0"
5	Andrea Palini (ITA)	Skydive Dubai–Al Ahli	+ 0"
6	John Degenkolb (GER)	Team Giant–Alpecin	+ 0"
7	Daniele Ratto (ITA)	UnitedHealthcare	+ 0"
8	Daniel Oss (ITA)	BMC Racing Team	+ 0"
9	Michael Valgren (DEN)	Tinkoff–Saxo	+ 0"
10	Nicola Ruffoni (ITA)	Bardiani–CSF	+ 0"

General classification after stage 2
Rank	Rider	Team	Time
1	Mark Cavendish (GBR)	Etixx–Quick-Step	7h 54' 43"
2	Elia Viviani (ITA)	Team Sky	+ 2"
3	Andrea Guardini (ITA)	Astana	+ 6"
4	Davide Frattini (ITA)	UnitedHealthcare	+ 11"
5	Ben Swift (GBR)	Team Sky	+ 13"
6	Enrico Battaglin (ITA)	Bardiani–CSF	+ 13"
7	Alessandro Bazzana (ITA)	UnitedHealthcare	+ 13"
8	Manuele Boaro (ITA)	Tinkoff–Saxo	+ 14"
9	Rafael Valls (ESP)	Lampre–Merida	+ 15"
10	Alexander Porsev (RUS)	Team Katusha	+ 16"

=== Stage 3 ===
6 February 2015 — Dubai International Marine Club to Hatta Dam, 205 km (127 mi)

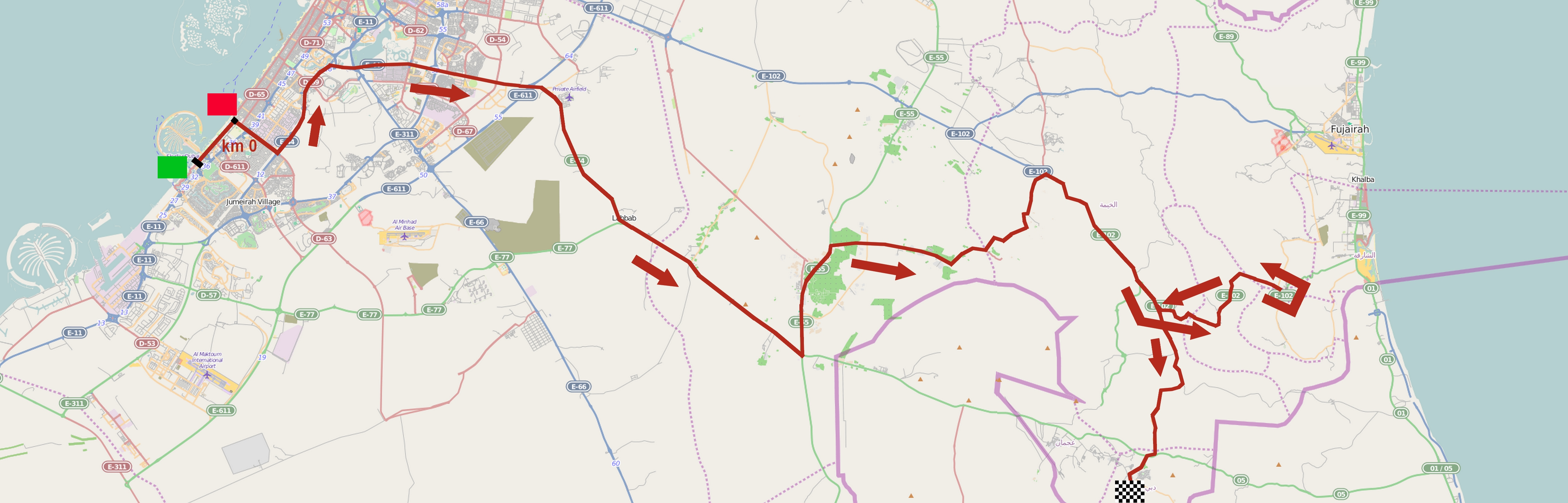
The route of stage three

Stage 3 result
Rank	Rider	Team	Time
1	John Degenkolb (GER)	Team Giant–Alpecin	4h 50' 40"
2	Alejandro Valverde (ESP)	Movistar Team	+ 2"
3	Juan José Lobato (ESP)	Movistar Team	+ 2"
4	Filippo Pozzato (ITA)	Lampre–Merida	+ 2"
5	Marco Canola (ITA)	UnitedHealthcare	+ 2"
6	Philippe Gilbert (BEL)	BMC Racing Team	+ 2"
7	Grega Bole (SLO)	CCC–Sprandi–Polkowice	+ 2"
8	Brent Bookwalter (USA)	BMC Racing Team	+ 7"
9	Geraint Thomas (GBR)	Team Sky	+ 7"
10	Edgar Pinto (POR)	Skydive Dubai–Al Ahli	+ 7"

General classification after stage 3
Rank	Rider	Team	Time
1	John Degenkolb (GER)	Team Giant–Alpecin	12h 45' 29"
2	Mark Cavendish (GBR)	Etixx–Quick-Step	+ 4"
3	Alejandro Valverde (ESP)	Movistar Team	+ 6"
4	Juan José Lobato (ESP)	Movistar Team	+ 8"
5	Alessandro Bazzana (ITA)	UnitedHealthcare	+ 11"
6	Grega Bole (SLO)	CCC–Sprandi–Polkowice	+ 12"
7	Marco Canola (ITA)	UnitedHealthcare	+ 12"
8	Philippe Gilbert (BEL)	BMC Racing Team	+ 12"
9	Filippo Pozzato (ITA)	Lampre–Merida	+ 12"
10	Edgar Pinto (POR)	Skydive Dubai–Al Ahli	+ 17"

=== Stage 4 ===
7 February 2015 — Dubai International Marine Club to Burj Khalifa, 123 km (76 mi)

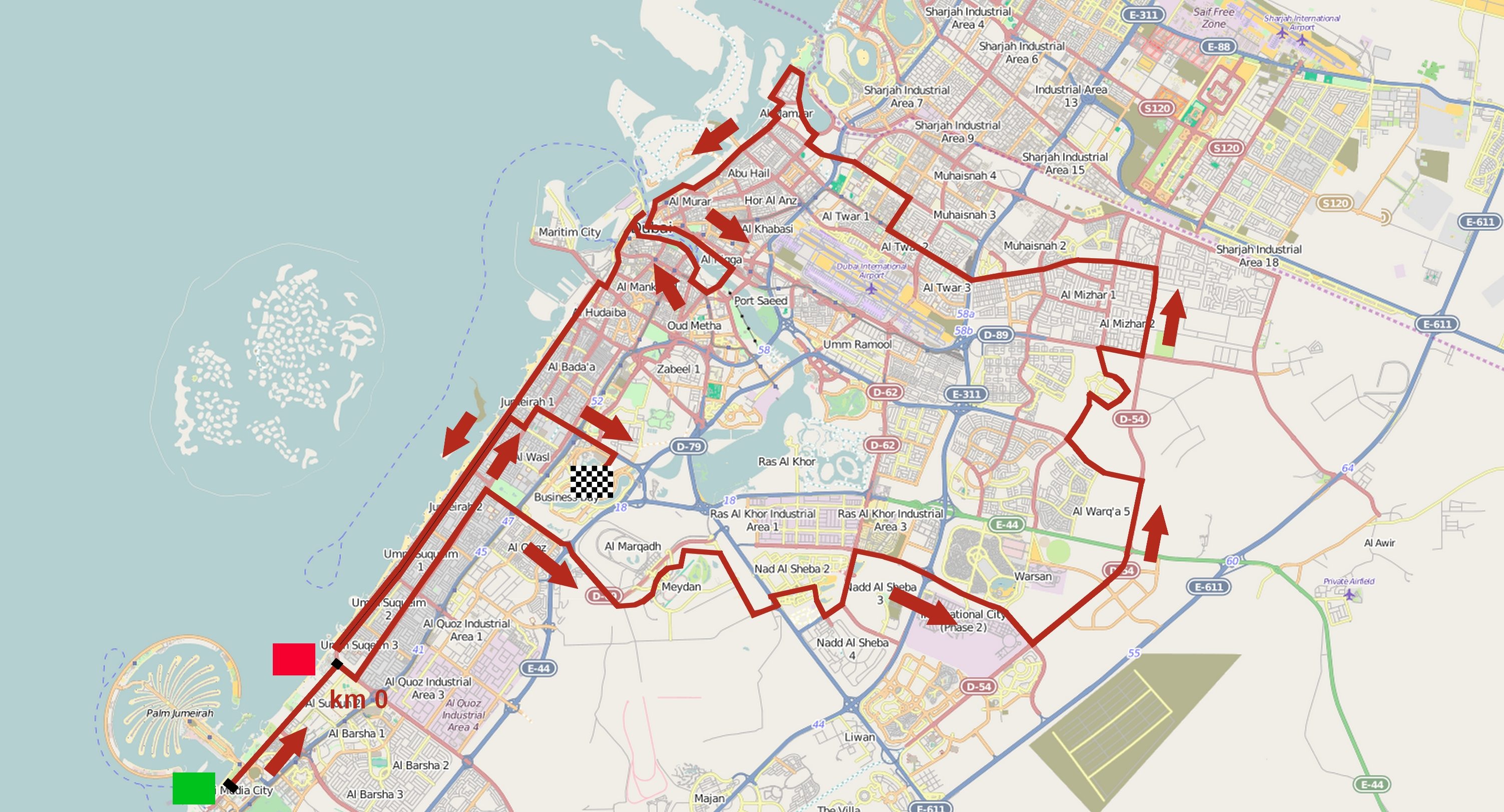
The route of stage four

Stage 4 result
Rank	Rider	Team	Time
1	Mark Cavendish (GBR)	Etixx–Quick-Step	2h 37' 15"
2	Elia Viviani (ITA)	Team Sky	+ 0"
3	Juan José Lobato (ESP)	Movistar Team	+ 0"
4	Ben Swift (GBR)	Team Sky	+ 0"
5	Andrea Guardini (ITA)	Astana	+ 0"
6	Daniele Ratto (ITA)	UnitedHealthcare	+ 0"
7	Martijn Verschoor (NED)	Team Novo Nordisk	+ 0"
8	Davide Cimolai (ITA)	Lampre–Merida	+ 0"
9	John Degenkolb (GER)	Team Giant–Alpecin	+ 0"
10	Andrea Palini (ITA)	Skydive Dubai–Al Ahli	+ 0"

Final general classification
Rank	Rider	Team	Time
1	Mark Cavendish (GBR)	Etixx–Quick-Step	15h 22' 38"
2	John Degenkolb (GER)	Team Giant–Alpecin	+ 6"
3	Juan José Lobato (ESP)	Movistar Team	+ 10"
4	Alejandro Valverde (ESP)	Movistar Team	+ 12"
5	Marco Canola (ITA)	UnitedHealthcare	+ 14"
6	Alessandro Bazzana (ITA)	UnitedHealthcare	+ 17"
7	Grega Bole (SLO)	CCC–Sprandi–Polkowice	+ 18"
8	Philippe Gilbert (BEL)	BMC Racing Team	+ 18"
9	Manuele Boaro (ITA)	Tinkoff–Saxo	+ 18"
10	Filippo Pozzato (ITA)	Lampre–Merida	+ 18"

== Classification leadership table ==
In the 2015 Dubai Tour, four different jerseys were awarded. For the general classification, calculated by adding each cyclist's finishing times on each stage, and allowing time bonuses for the first three finishers at intermediate sprints and at the finish of mass-start stages, the leader received a blue jersey. This classification was considered the most important of the 2015 Dubai Tour, and the winner of the classification was considered the winner of the race.

Additionally, there was a points classification, which awarded a red jersey. In the points classification, cyclists received points for finishing in the top 10 in a stage. For winning a stage, a rider earned 20 points, with 16 for second, 12 for third, 9 for fourth, 7 for fifth, 5 for sixth with a point fewer per place down to a single point for 10th place. Points towards the classification could also be accrued at intermediate sprint points during each stage; these intermediate sprints also offered bonus seconds towards the general classification. There was also a sprints classification for the points awarded at the aforementioned intermediate sprints, where the leadership of which was marked by a jersey in the colours of the United Arab Emirates flag.

The fourth jersey represented the young rider classification, marked by a white jersey. This was decided in the same way as the general classification, but only riders born after 1 January 1990 were eligible to be ranked in the classification. There was also a classification for teams, in which the times of the best three cyclists per team on each stage were added together; the leading team at the end of the race was the team with the lowest total time.

Stage	Winner	General classification	Points classification	Sprint classification	Young rider classification	Team classification
1	Mark Cavendish	Mark Cavendish	Mark Cavendish	Ben Swift	Paolo Simion	BMC Racing Team
2	Elia Viviani	Mark Cavendish	Mark Cavendish	Davide Frattini	Paolo Simion	BMC Racing Team
3	John Degenkolb	John Degenkolb	Mark Cavendish	Alessandro Bazzana	Michael Valgren	BMC Racing Team
4	Mark Cavendish	Mark Cavendish	Mark Cavendish	Alessandro Bazzana	Michael Valgren	BMC Racing Team
Final		Mark Cavendish	Mark Cavendish	Alessandro Bazzana	Michael Valgren	BMC Racing Team

== Final standings ==
=== General classification ===
The overall title was taken by Mark Cavendish due to his winning two stages.

	Rider	Team	Time
1	Mark Cavendish (GBR)	Etixx–Quick-Step	15h 22' 38"
2	John Degenkolb (GER)	Team Giant–Alpecin	+ 6"
3	Juan José Lobato (ESP)	Movistar Team	+ 10"
4	Alejandro Valverde (ESP)	Movistar Team	+ 12"
5	Marco Canola (ITA)	UnitedHealthcare	+ 14"
6	Alessandro Bazzana (ITA)	UnitedHealthcare	+ 17"
7	Grega Bole (SLO)	CCC–Sprandi–Polkowice	+ 18"
8	Philippe Gilbert (BEL)	BMC Racing Team	+ 18"
9	Manuele Boaro (ITA)	Tinkoff–Saxo	+ 18"
10	Filippo Pozzato (ITA)	Lampre–Merida	+ 18"
