= Thomas Rohregger =

Austrian cyclist (born 1982)

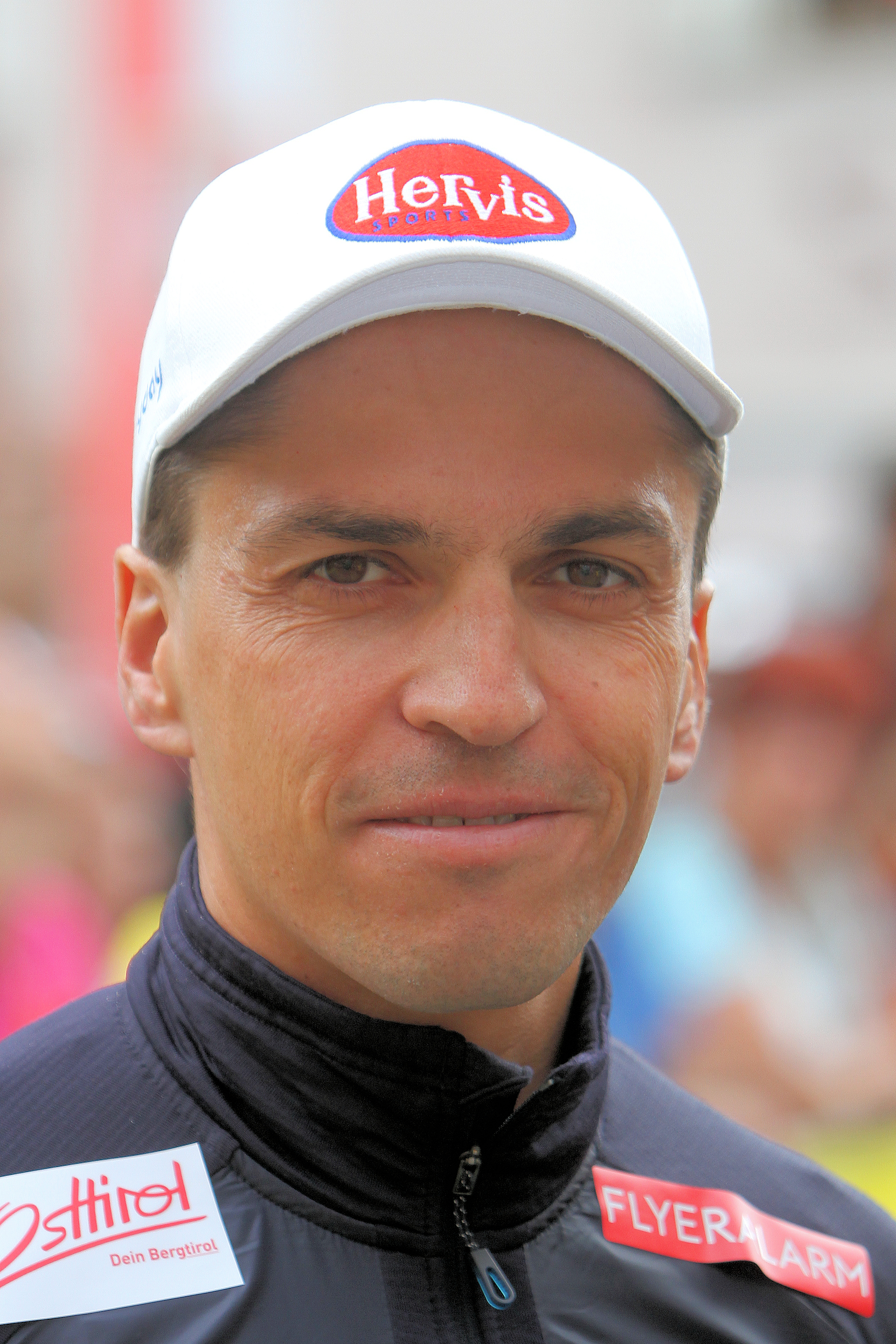
- Thomas Rohregger (2019).

Personal information
- Full name: Thomas Rohregger
- Born: 23 December 1982 (age 43) Innsbruck, Tyrol, Austria

Cycling career
- Sport: Cycling
- Current team: Retired
- Discipline: Road
- Role: Rider

Amateur team
- 2003–2004: Hervis

Professional teams
- 2005–2008: Elk Haus–Simplon
- 2009–2010: Team Milram
- 2011–2013: Leopard Trek

Major wins
- Grand Tours Vuelta a España 1 TTT stage (2011) Stage races Tour of Austria (2008)

Thomas Rohregger (born 23 December 1982) is an Austrian former professional road bicycle racer, who competed as a professional between 2005 and 2013. Over his career, Rohregger competed for Elk Haus–Simplon, Team Milram and RadioShack–Leopard.

Rohregger retired at the end of the 2013 season, after nine years as a professional.

In retirement, Rohregger was involved in the course design for the 2018 UCI Road World Championships around Innsbruck.

== Major results ==
2006
1st Mountains classification Tour de Luxembourg (2.HC)
2nd National Time Trial Championships
4th National Road Race Championships
4th Overall Tour of Austria (2.HC)

1st Mountains classification

2007
2nd Overall Tour of Austria (2.HC)

1st Stage 3

3rd National Road Race Championships
4th Overall Giro del Trentino (2.1)
6th Rund um den Henninger (1.HC)
2008
1st Overall Tour of Austria
7th Overall Tour du Luxembourg
2010
1st Mountains classification Tour Down Under
2011
4th Overall Tour of Austria
1st Stage 1 (TTT) Vuelta a España
2012
7th Overall Tour of Austria
