= Alessandro Bazzana =

Italian cyclist

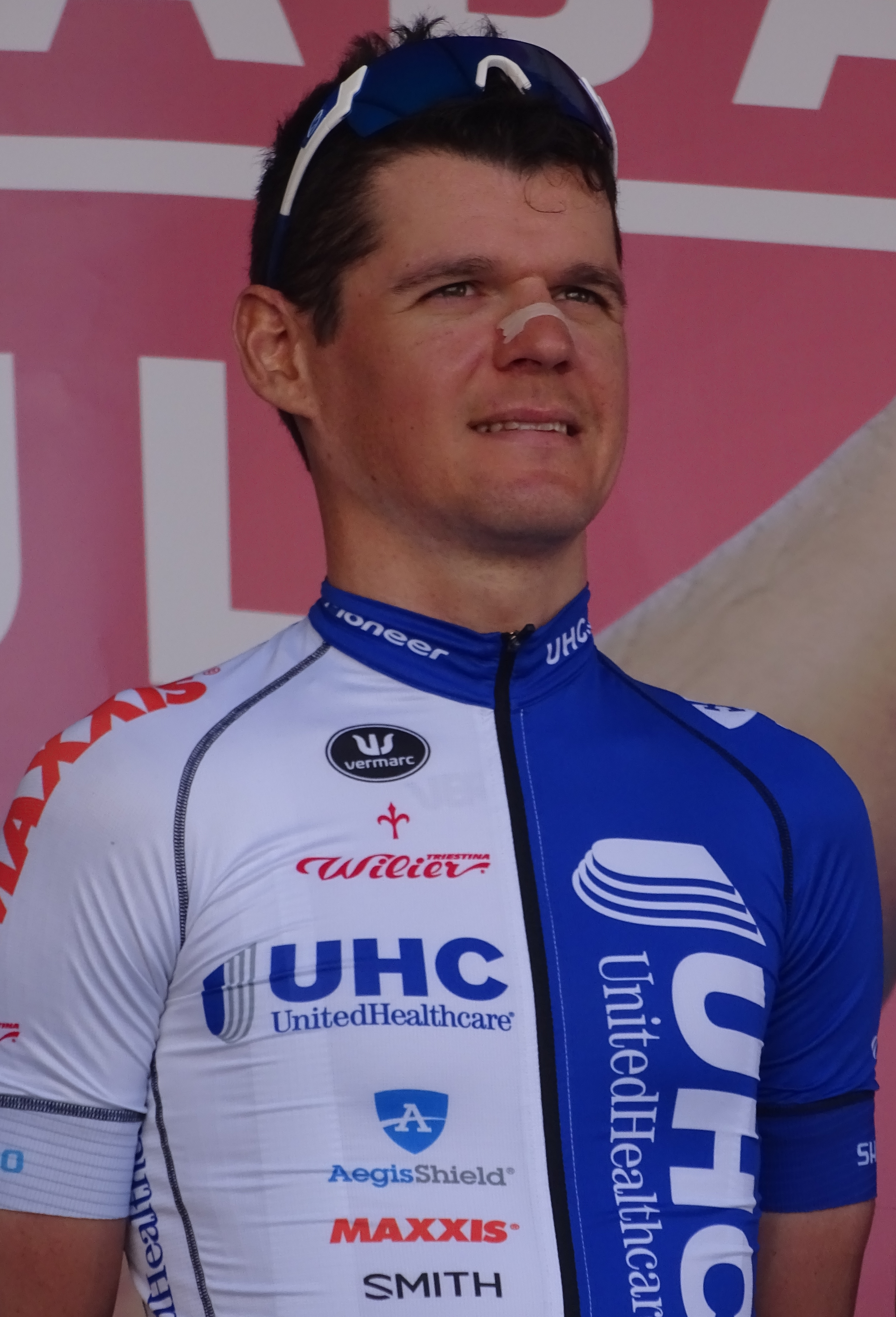

Personal information
- Full name: Alessandro Bazzana
- Born: July 16, 1984 (age 42) Alzano Lombardo, Italy
- Height: 178 cm (5 ft 10 in)
- Weight: 63 kg (139 lb)

Cycling career
- Sport: Cycling
- Current team: Retired
- Discipline: Road
- Role: Rider
- Rider type: Sprinter

Professional teams
- 2007–2008: Successfulliving.com–Parkpre
- 2009–2010: Fly V Australia
- 2011–2012: Team Type 1–Sanofi Aventis
- 2013–2015: UnitedHealthcare

Alessandro Bazzana (born 16 July 1984 in Alzano Lombardo) is an Italian former professional cyclist.

== Major results ==
2005
3rd Trofeo Banca Popolare di Vicenza
2006
6th Trofeo Banca Popolare di Vicenza
2008
7th Overall Rochester Omnium
8th Tour de Leelanau
2009
9th US Air Force Cycling Classic
2011
10th Tour de Mumbai II
2012
Tour of Austria

1st Points classification
1st Stage 1

7th Paris–Brussels
9th Grand Prix de Fourmies
2013
6th Le Samyn
2014
4th Dwars door Drenthe
4th Bucks County Classic
6th Roma Maxima
7th Volta Limburg Classic
2015
1st Sprints classification Abu Dhabi Tour
5th Overall World Ports Classic
6th Overall Dubai Tour

1st Sprints classification

8th Ronde van Drenthe
