= Steve Morabito =

Swiss road bicycle racer

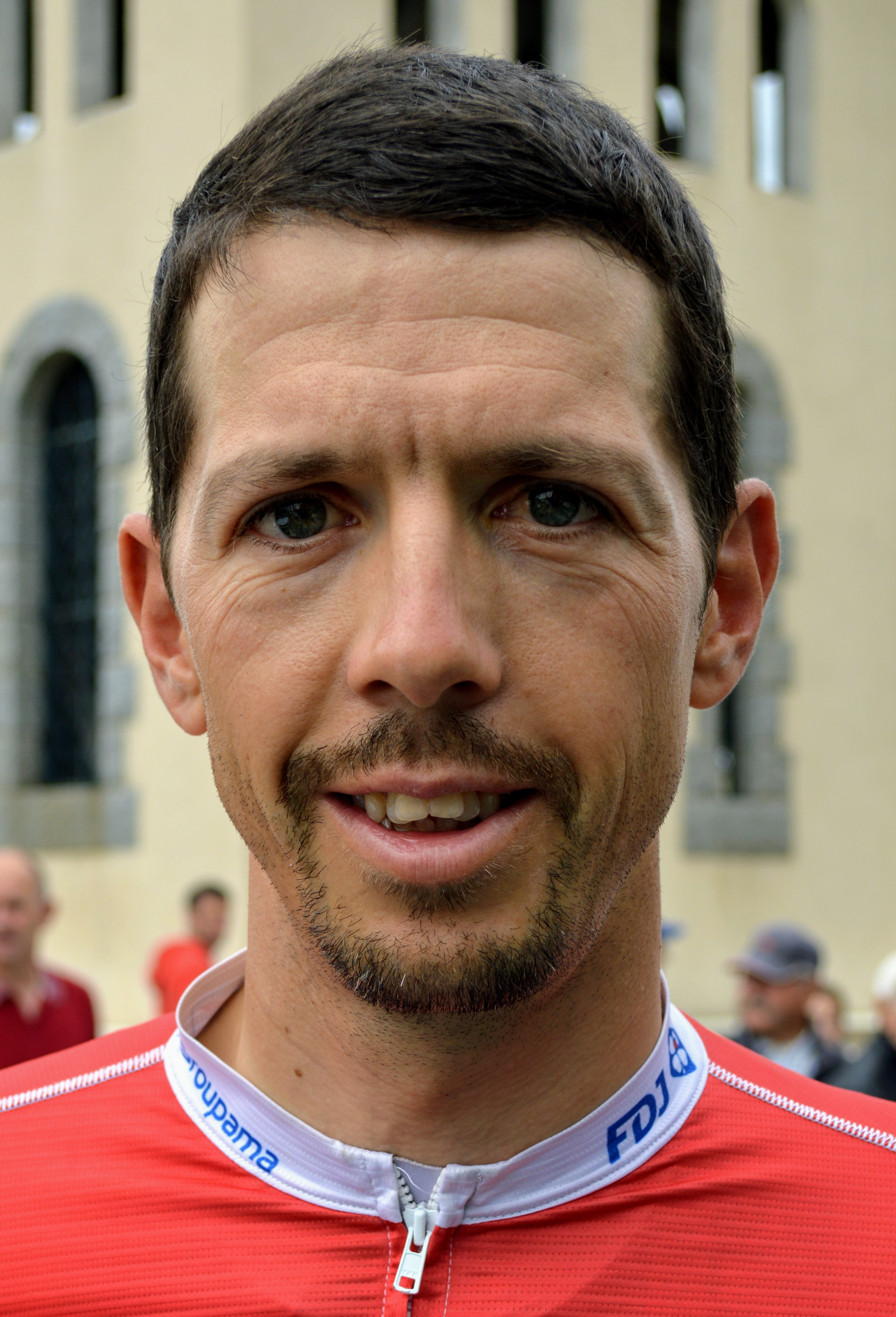
- Morabito in 2019

Personal information
- Born: 30 January 1983 (age 43) Monthey, Valais, Switzerland
- Height: 1.87 m (6 ft 2 in)
- Weight: 74 kg (163 lb)

Cycling career
- Sport: Cycling
- Current team: Retired
- Discipline: Road
- Role: Rider
- Rider type: Climber; Rouleur

Amateur team
- 2002–2005: VC Mendrisio–Mapei–PL Valli

Professional teams
- 2006: Phonak
- 2007–2009: Astana
- 2010–2014: BMC Racing Team
- 2015–2019: FDJ

Major wins
- One-day races and Classics National Road Race Championships (2018)

Steve Morabito (born 30 January 1983) is a Swiss former professional road bicycle racer, who competed professionally between 2006 and 2019 for the Phonak, Astana, BMC Racing Team and Groupama–FDJ teams.

== Major results ==
2001
3rd Road race, National Junior Road Championships
2004
8th Overall Grand Prix Guillaume Tell
2005
8th Road race, UCI Under-23 Road World Championships
8th Giro del Lago Maggiore
2006
1st Stage 5 Tour de Suisse
2nd GP Triberg-Schwarzwald
2007
2nd Overall Herald Sun Tour

1st Stages 4 & 6 (ITT)

4th GP Miguel Induráin
2008
7th Overall Circuit de la Sarthe
2010
4th Overall Tour de Suisse
7th Overall Circuit de la Sarthe
2011
2nd Road race, National Road Championships
5th Overall Giro del Trentino
9th Overall Tour of California
2012
2nd Overall Tour of Austria
2014
1st Stage 1 (TTT) Giro del Trentino
3rd Road race, National Road Championships
6th Overall Tour de Suisse
2015
3rd Time trial, National Road Championships
8th Overall Tour de Suisse
2016
3rd Road race, National Road Championships
9th Overall Tour Down Under
2018
1st Road race, National Road Championships
2019
7th Overall Boucles de la Mayenne

=== Grand Tour general classification results timeline ===
Grand Tour	2006	2007	2008	2009	2010	2011	2012	2013	2014	2015	2016	2017	2018	2019
Giro d'Italia	—	83	DNF	88	—	—	—	34	25	—	—	53	79	—
Tour de France	—	—	—	—	51	49	—	35	—	DNF	36	—	—	—
Vuelta a España	84	—	—	—	—	—	35	—	DNF	—	—	—	—	67

Legend
—	Did not compete
DNF	Did not finish
