= Fredrik Kessiakoff =

Swedish cyclist

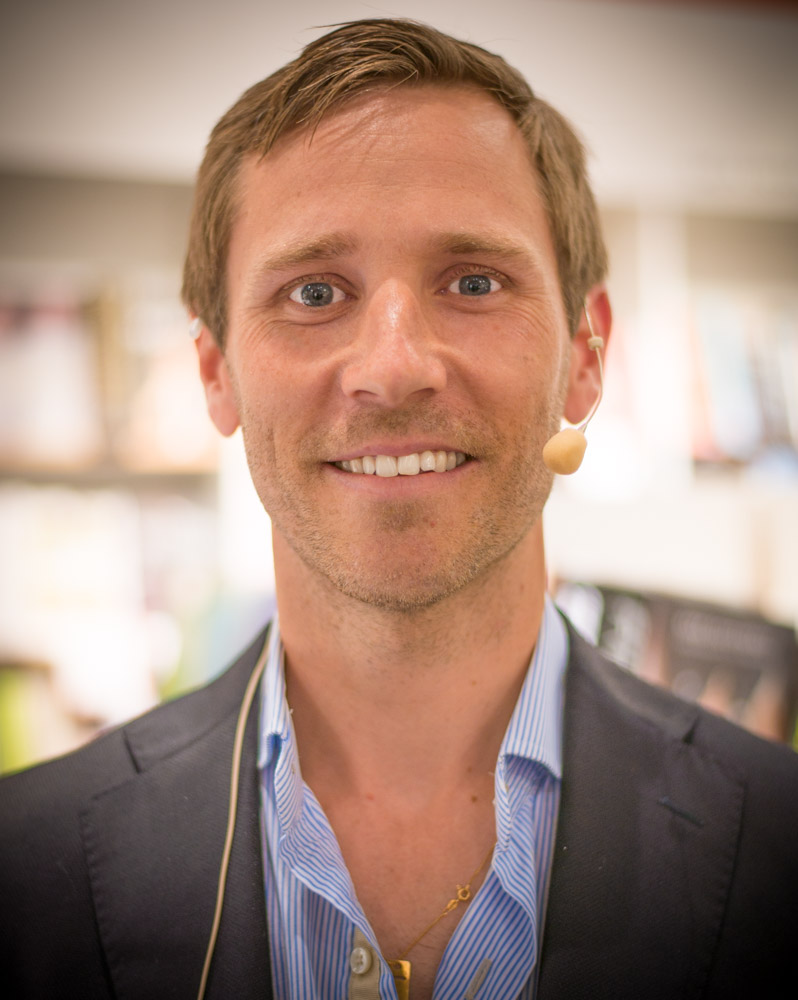
- Fredrik Kessiakoff in June 2015

Personal information
- Full name: Fredrik Carl Wilhelm Kessiakoff
- Born: 17 May 1980 (age 46) Nacka, Sweden
- Height: 1.75 m (5 ft 9 in)
- Weight: 62 kg (137 lb)

Cycling career
- Sport: Cycling
- Current team: XDS Astana Team
- Disciplines: Road; Mountain biking (former)
- Role: Rider

Professional teams
- 2000–2002: Crescent
- 2004: Siemens-Cannondale
- 2007: Cannondale-Vredestein
- 2008: Full Dynamix-IT
- 2009: Fuji–Servetto
- 2010: Garmin–Transitions
- 2011–2014: Astana

Major wins
- Grand Tours Vuelta a España 1 individual stage (2012) Stage races Tour of Austria (2011)
Medal record
Representing Sweden
Men's mountain bike racing
World Championships
Bronze medal – third place	2006 Rotorua	Cross-country
European Championships
Bronze medal – third place	2007 Cappadocia	Cross-country

Fredrik Carl Wilhelm Kessiakoff (born 17 May 1980) is a Swedish former professional road bicycle racer. Kessiakoff turned to road racing in 2009, having had a successful career as a professional mountain biker for many years, winning the Swedish national championship 4 times, and finishing third at the 2006 World Mountain biking championships. He twice represented Sweden at the Olympics. Kessiakoff retired in 2014.

== Major results ==
=== Mountain bike ===
2002
1st Cross-country, National Under-23 Championships
1st Overall Swedish Cup
2003
2nd National Championships
2004
1st Cross-country, National Championships
2005
1st World Cup Marathon, Falun, Sweden
1st Sunshine Cup, Cyprus
2nd Overall Cape Epic (with Christoph Sauser)
3rd Team relay, UEC European Championships
4th Cross-country, UCI World Championships
2006
1st Cross-country, National Championships
1st Nordic Championships
1st Overall Bundesliga, Germany
1st Int Italia, Nalles, Italy
3rd Cross-country, UCI World Championships
UEC European Championships

3rd Team relay
4th Cross-country

2007
1st Cross-country, National Championships
1st World Cup Final
3rd Cross-country, UEC European Championships
4th Cross-country, UCI World Championships
2008
1st Cross-country, National Championships
1st Sunshine Race, Cyprus
5th Cross-country, UCI World Championships

=== Road ===
2009
4th Overall Tour de Langkawi
6th GP Lugano
6th Giro dell'Emilia
9th Overall Tour de Romandie
2011 (2 pro wins)
1st Overall Tour of Austria

1st Stage 2

2012 (2)
1st Stage 11 (ITT) Vuelta a España
1st Stage 7 (ITT) Tour de Suisse
2nd Giro dell'Emilia
3rd Milano–Torino
5th Time trial, UCI World Championships
9th Overall Tour du Haut-Var
10th Giro di Lombardia
Tour de France

Held after Stages 8–9 & 11–15

==== Grand Tour general classification results timeline ====
Grand Tour	2009	2010	2011	2012	2013	2014
Giro d'Italia	50	—	—	—	90	—
Tour de France	—	—	—	40	DNF	—
/ Vuelta a España	72	—	34	61	—	—

Legend
—	Did not compete
DNF	Did not finish
