= Robert Vrečer =

Slovenian racing cyclist

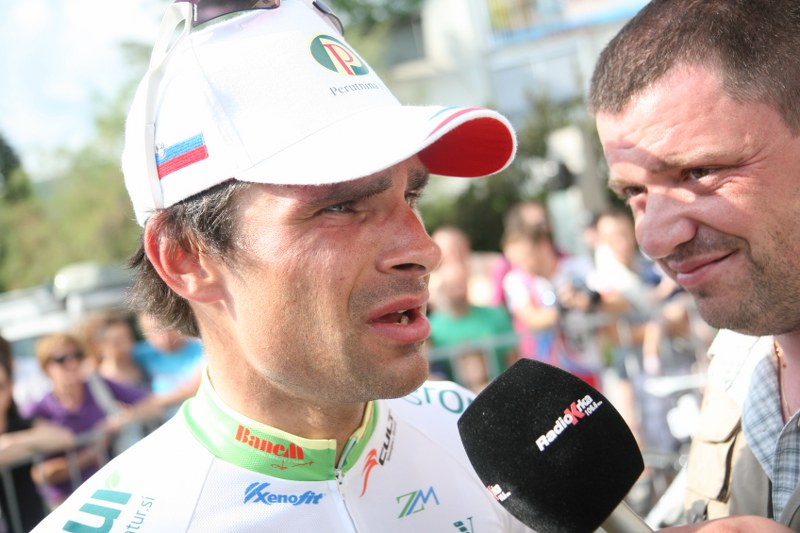
- Vrečer at the 2011 Tour of Slovenia

Personal information
- Full name: Robert Vrečer
- Born: 8 October 1980 (age 46) Celje, SR Slovenia, SFR Yugoslavia
- Height: 1.82 m (6 ft 0 in)
- Weight: 68 kg (150 lb)

Cycling career
- Sport: Cycling
- Current team: Retired
- Discipline: Road
- Role: Rider
- Rider type: All-rounder

Professional teams
- 2006–2008: Radenska–PowerBar
- 2009: Adria Mobil
- 2010: Perutnina Ptuj
- 2011: Obrazi Delo Revije
- 2012: Team Vorarlberg
- 2013: Euskaltel–Euskadi
- 2014: Team Vorarlberg

Robert Vrečer (born 8 October 1980) is a Slovenian former professional road racing cyclist, who rode professionally between 2006 and 2014 for the Radenska–KD Financial Point, Adria Mobil, Perutnina Ptuj, Euskaltel–Euskadi, and Team Vorarlberg teams.

Following a positive clomifene control, Vrečer was suspended, for twenty months, on 30 July 2014.

== Major results ==
2008
9th Trofeo Zsšdi
2009
2nd GP Kranj
10th Trofeo Zsšdi
2010
1st Overall Istrian Spring Trophy

1st Prologue & Stage 2

1st Overall Tour de Slovaquie

1st Stages 4 & 5

8th Trofeo Zsšdi
2011
1st Overall Szlakiem Grodów Piastowskich
1st Overall Istrian Spring Trophy

1st Prologue & Stage 2

National Road Championships

2nd Time trial
7th Road race

3rd Overall Tour of Slovenia

1st Prologue

2012
National Road Championships

1st Time trial
7th Road race

1st Overall Tour of Greece

1st Stage 1

2nd Gran Premio Nobili Rubinetterie
3rd Overall Tour of Austria
3rd Duo Normand (with Andreas Hofer)
2013
Tour de Suisse

1st Mountains classification
1st Sprints classification
