= Angelo Pagani =

Italian bicycle racer

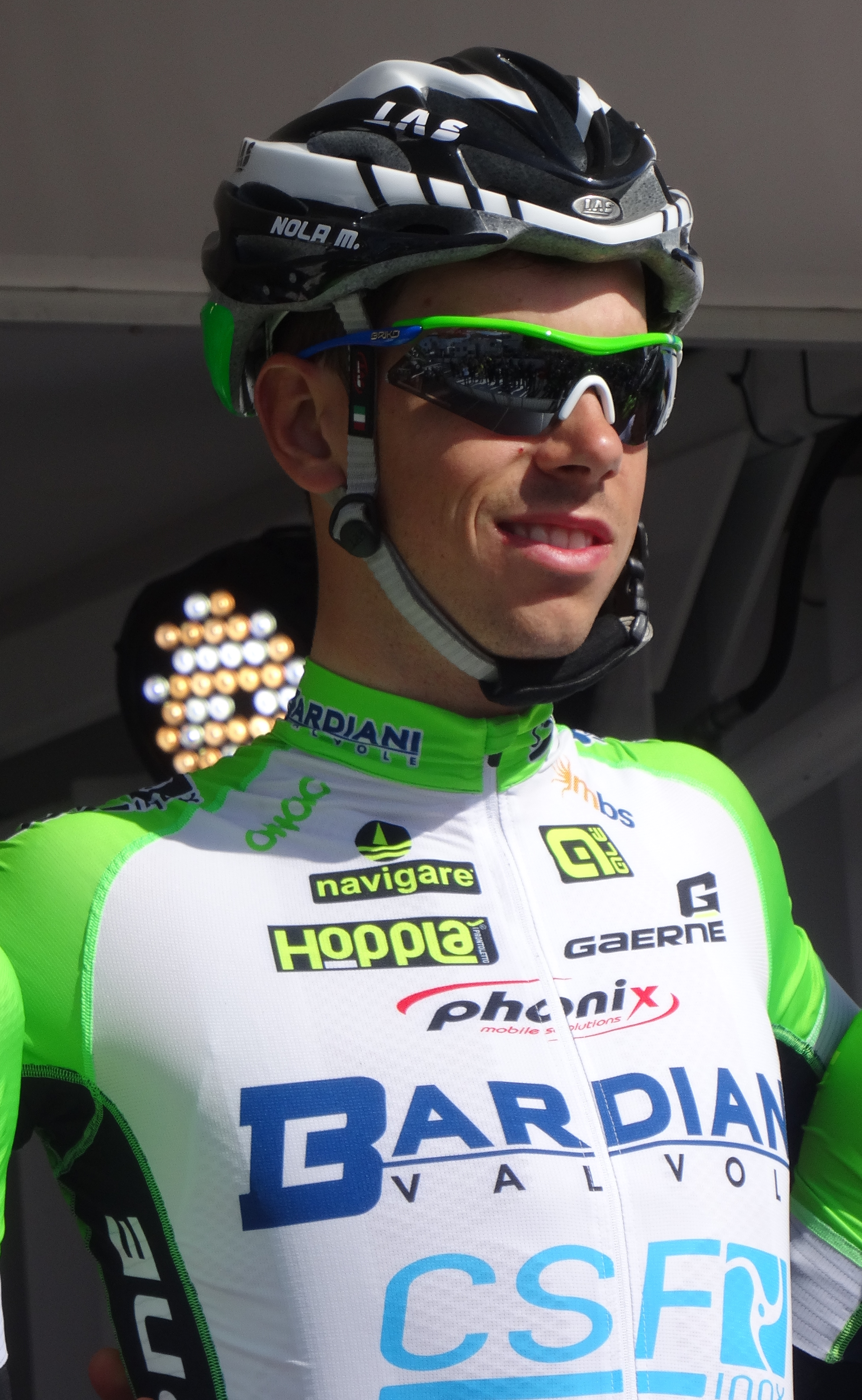
- Pagani in 2014

Personal information
- Full name: Angelo Pagani
- Born: 4 August 1988 (age 38) Mariano Comense

Cycling career
- Sport: Cycling
- Current team: Retired
- Discipline: Road
- Role: Rider

Amateur teams
- 2007: Finauto Neri Lucchini Zoccorinese
- 2008–2009: Filmop Sorelle Ramonda Bottoli
- 2010: U.C. Trevigiani–Dynamon–Bottoli

Professional team
- 2011–2014: Colnago–CSF Inox

Angelo Pagani (born 4 August 1988 in Mariano Comense) is an Italian former cyclist, who rode professionally between 2011 and 2014, exclusively for the Bardiani–CSF team.

== Major results ==
2005
3rd Trofeo Emilio Paganessi
2006
2nd Time trial, National Junior Road Championships
2007
2nd Giro del Canavese
3rd Memorial Davide Fardelli
2008
3rd Giro del Canavese
7th Memorial Davide Fardelli
2009
2nd Overall Giro della Valle d'Aosta
7th Giro Valli Aretine
7th Coppa della Pace
8th Paris–Roubaix Espoirs
2010
2nd Giro del Belvedere
3rd Overall Giro delle Regioni

1st Stage 2

2012
1st Stage 1 (TTT) Giro di Padania
1st Young rider classification Tour of Austria
9th Coppa Agostoni
2013
5th Overall Tour de Slovénie
6th Coppa Agostoni
8th Overall Tour of Qinghai Lake

=== Grand Tour General Classification results timeline ===
Grand Tour	2012	2013	2014
Giro	97	—	—
Tour	—	—	—
Vuelta	—	—	—

WD = Withdrew; In Progress = IP
