= Alpendorf =

Village in St. Johann im Pongau, Austria

Coordinates: 47°19′23″N 13°11′44″E

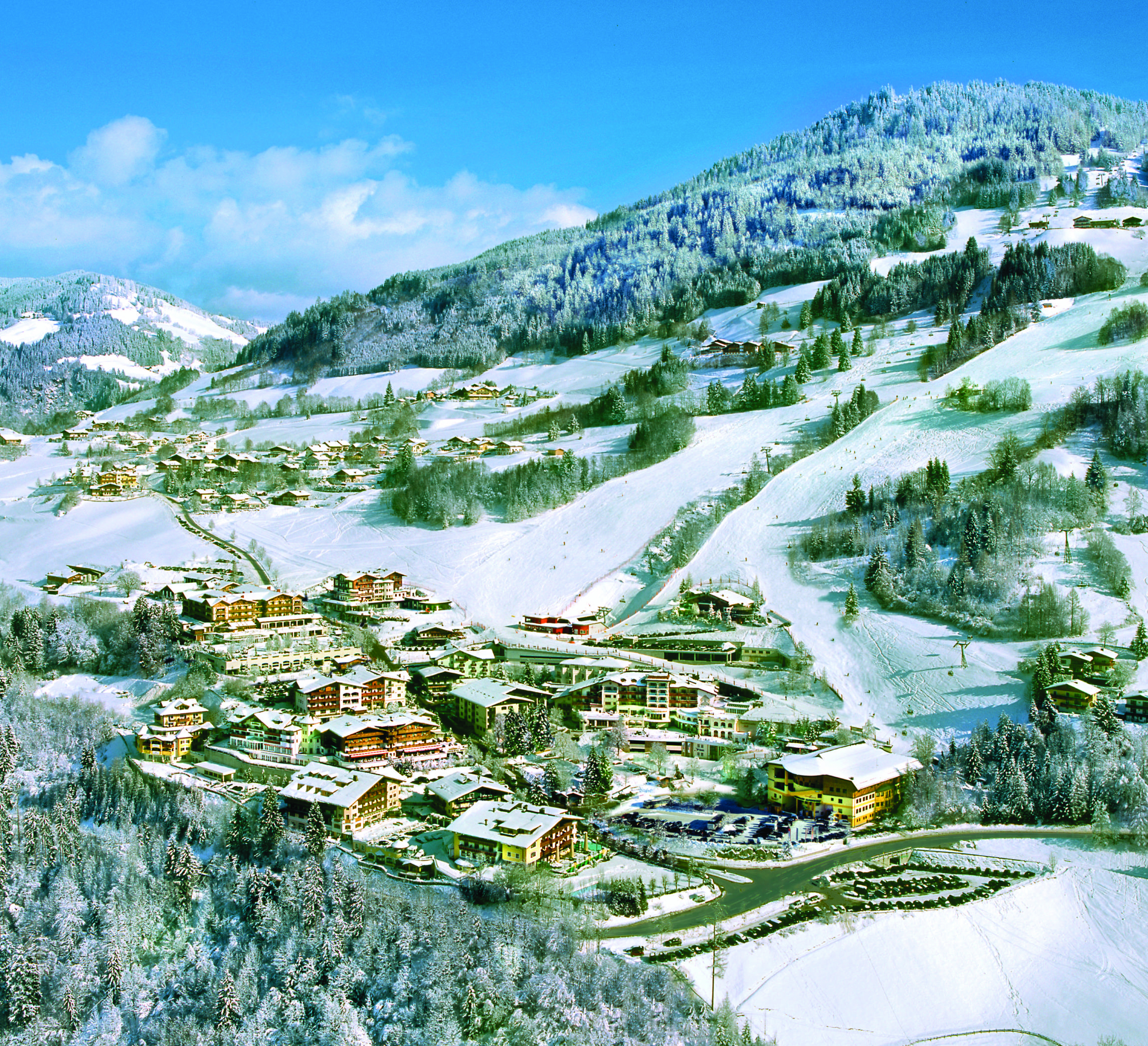

Alpendorf (German for alpine village) is a village and a part of the town St. Johann im Pongau. It is 55 km (34 mi) south of the Austrian city of Salzburg. It is at an altitude of 850 m (2,790 ft) above sea level.

It is 3 km (1.9 mi) away from the town centre of Sankt Johann im Pongau, a large town dominated by the Cathedral of Pongau.

The economy is largely dependent on tourism, particularly during the winter months when thousands of predominantly German, Danish and Dutch skiers visiting the village. The resort is popular with members of the British and American forces based in Germany. There are also a significant number of English and Welsh schools visiting the area.

== Accommodation ==
The resort is largely made up of four- and five-star hotels with wellness areas and restaurants. More reasonably priced accommodation can be found in St Johann, where hotels run a free shuttle bus. There is also a free ski shuttle bus that runs throughout the season from St Johann to Alpendorf.

== Skiing ==
Alpendorf serves as one of the gateways to the Salzburger Sportwelt, one of the five alliances that make up Ski Amadé, a network of resorts with over 870 slopes and 270 modern ski lifts.

The resort, as a result of its location in the Eastern Alps, has a good record for winter snow. There are lakes containing 30,000 cubic metres (1,100,000 cu ft) of fresh water, which is used by the snow cannon that cover 95% of the slopes.

=== Resort statistics ===
- Altitude 850 m - 2188 m
- Length of ski trails: 350 km
- Cross-country trails: 220 km
- Snow cannons: 150
- Mountain restaurants: 80

=== Lift statistics ===
- Button lifts: 1
- T-Bars: 2
- Chair lifts (4 to 8 seater): 35
- Gondola lifts (6 to 16 seated and standing): 12
- Aerial cable car: 1
- People movements: 56,000 an hour

=== Slope statistics ===
- Blue Slopes (least challenging): 119 km
- Red Slopes (intermediate): 189 km
- Black Slopes (difficult): 42 km

== Famous residents ==
- Hermann Maier (nearby village of Flachau)
- Ralf Schumacher
