= Petr Ignatenko =

Russian cyclist

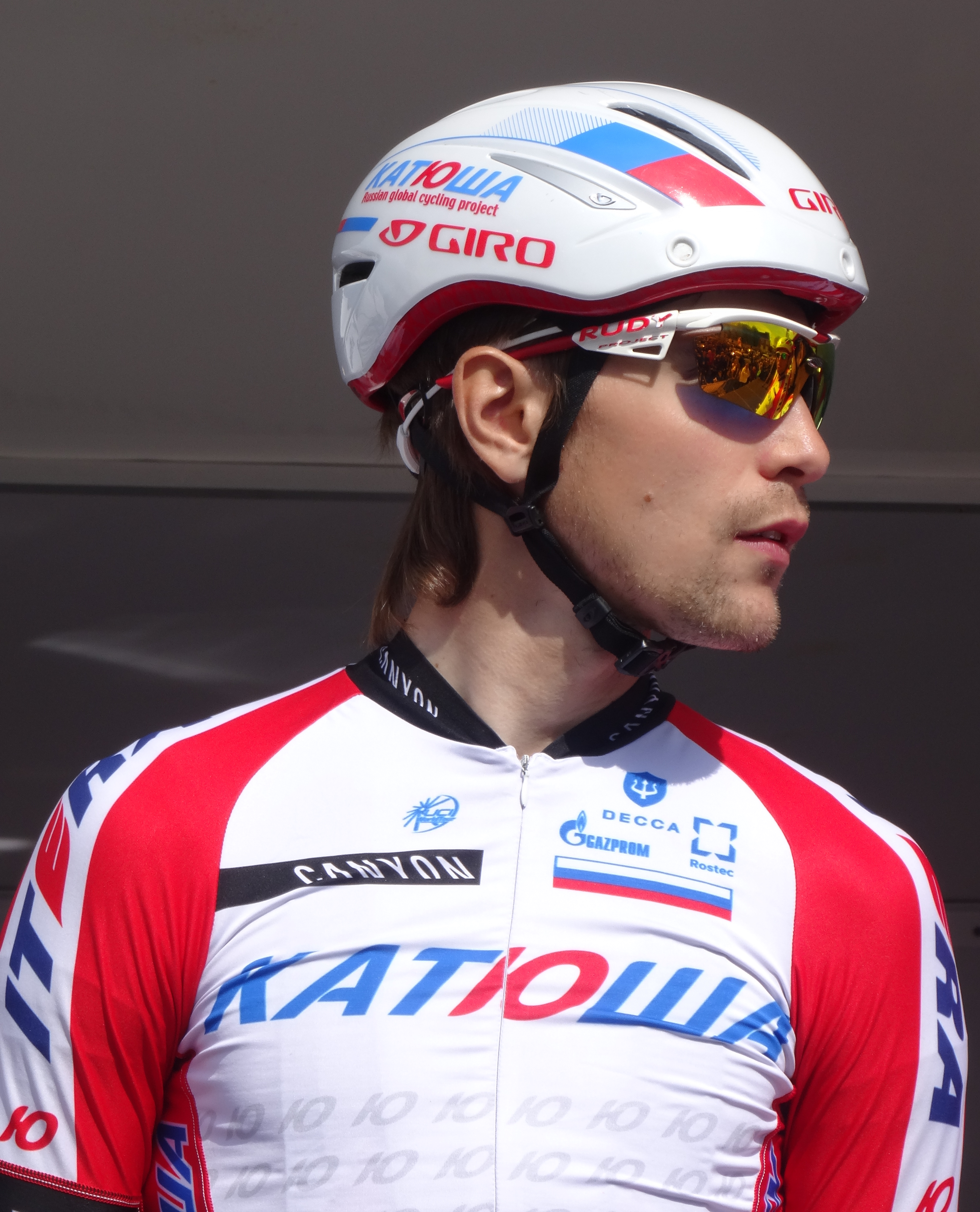
- Ignatenko at the 2014 Grand Prix de Denain

Personal information
- Full name: Petr Ignatenko
- Nickname: Ignaten
- Born: 27 September 1987 (age 39) Omsk, Soviet Union
- Height: 1.80 m (5 ft 11 in)
- Weight: 63 kg (139 lb)

Cycling career
- Sport: Cycling
- Discipline: Road
- Role: Rider
- Rider type: Climbing specialist

Professional teams
- 2009–2010: Itera–Katusha
- 2011–2014: Team Katusha
- 2015: RusVelo

Petr Ignatenko (born 27 September 1987) is a Russian professional road racing cyclist.

== Doping ==
In June 2015, Petr Ignatenko tested positive for human growth hormone (hGH) in an out-of-competition test on 8 April 2015. This is only the second hGH positive since Patrick Sinkewitz returned an adverse analytical finding for the substance. This represented RusVelo's fifth positive in less than two years, Ignatenko was subsequently fired by the team.

== Palmarès ==
2008
2nd Overall Way to Peking
2010
1st Overall Giro della Valle d'Aosta

1st Stage 3

1st Stage 7 Tour of Bulgaria
2012
Tour de Romandie

1st Sprints classification
1st Mountains classification

9th Overall Tour of Austria
2013
6th Overall Tour of Austria
2014
5th Overall Tour de Langkawi

Grand Tour general classification results timeline

Grand Tour	2013
Giro d'Italia	40
Tour de France	—
Vuelta a España	—

Legend
—	Did not compete
DNF	Did not finish

== See also ==
- List of doping cases in cycling
