= Podersdorf am See =

- Municipality
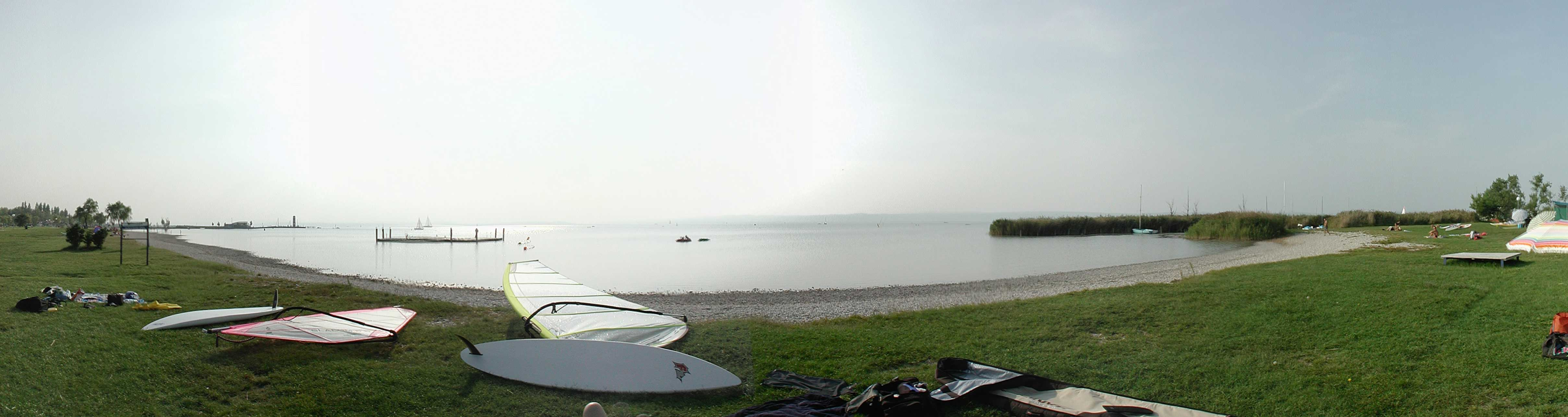
- Lake Neusiedl in the village

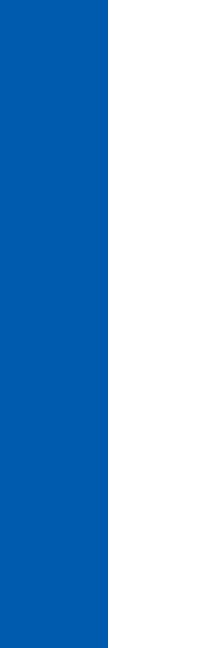
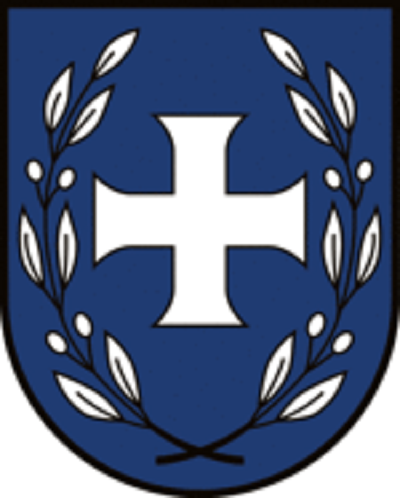
- Flag Coat of arms

- Location within Austria
- Coordinates: 47°51′N 16°50′E
- Country: Austria
- State: Burgenland
- District: Neusiedl am See

Government
  - Mayor: Michaela Wohlfart (ÖVP)

Area
  - Total: 41.73 km^{2} (16.11 sq mi)
- Elevation: 121 m (397 ft)

Population (2018-01-01)
  - Total: 2,135
  - Density: 51.16/km^{2} (132.5/sq mi)
- Time zone: UTC+1 (CET)
  - Summer (DST): UTC+2 (CEST)
- Postal code: 7141
- Area code: 02177

Podersdorf am See (Hungarian: Pátfalu) is a market town in the district of Neusiedl am See in Burgenland in the east of Austria on the shore of the Neusiedler See. It is home to a windmill and lake (pictured below).

The town is a local center of tourism with generous bathing facilities. Originally a tiny peasant dwelling owned by the Heiligenkreuz Abbey, the economy is now based on tourism and quality wine making.

== Geography ==
Podersdorf is located on the eastern shore of Lake Neusiedl, 121 meters above sea level. It is the only village where access to the lake is not impeded by mud and reed growth. The region between Neusiedl am See and Hungary is known as Seewinkel and is part of the Little Hungarian Plain. This flat and mostly treeless Puszta with numerous small lakes and ponds, shows a unique flora and fauna. The town is part of the national park Neusiedler See-Seewinkel. Since 2001, the cultural landscape has been a World Heritage Site.

== History ==
Discoveries from the Stone Age and Bronze Age show that the area around Podersdorf has been populated for a very long time. In 9 AC the province 'Pannonia' was established. Deforestation of oak woods by early dwellers lead to the bleak Puszta landscape that predominates today. Podersdorf was regularly exposed to raiding horse people like the Huns, Magyars or Avars. In the 13th century, the earl Poth took over Podersdorf and Potzneusiedl, which explains the name change from Altdorf to Podersdorf. In the donation document of the year 1217, which is evidence of the donation to the Cistercian Order instructed by King Andreas II, the village is evidenced by documents for the first time.

Until 1919/20, Podersdorf was named 'Patfal' and was part of Hungary. After the First World War, Burgenland was named Deutsch-Westungarn (German-West Hungary) in the 1919 Treaty of St. German and the Treaty of Trianon and was awarded to Austria in 1919. Since 1921, the town has been part of the newly founded State of Burgenland.

Beginning in 1970s, several Avar graves dating from the 7th century were uncovered, with over 35 being in a cemetery and 5 in a pit house.

== Population ==
Historical population
Year	Pop.	±%
1869	1,017	—
1880	1,126	+10.7%
1890	1,151	+2.2%
1900	1,185	+3.0%
1910	1,214	+2.4%
1923	1,261	+3.9%
1934	1,431	+13.5%
1939	1,528	+6.8%
1951	1,566	+2.5%
1961	1,627	+3.9%
1971	1,814	+11.5%
1981	1,845	+1.7%
1991	2,122	+15.0%
2001	1,998	−5.8%
2011	2,078	+4.0%

== Tourism ==
Podersdorf is the largest and most popular touristic town within the Seewinkel. The village is favored by ornithologists, water sport enthusiasts and nature lovers. The protected pannonian landscape and the countless local Heurigen serve as destinations for cyclists and hikers.
