= Marco Canola =

Italian cyclist (born 1988)

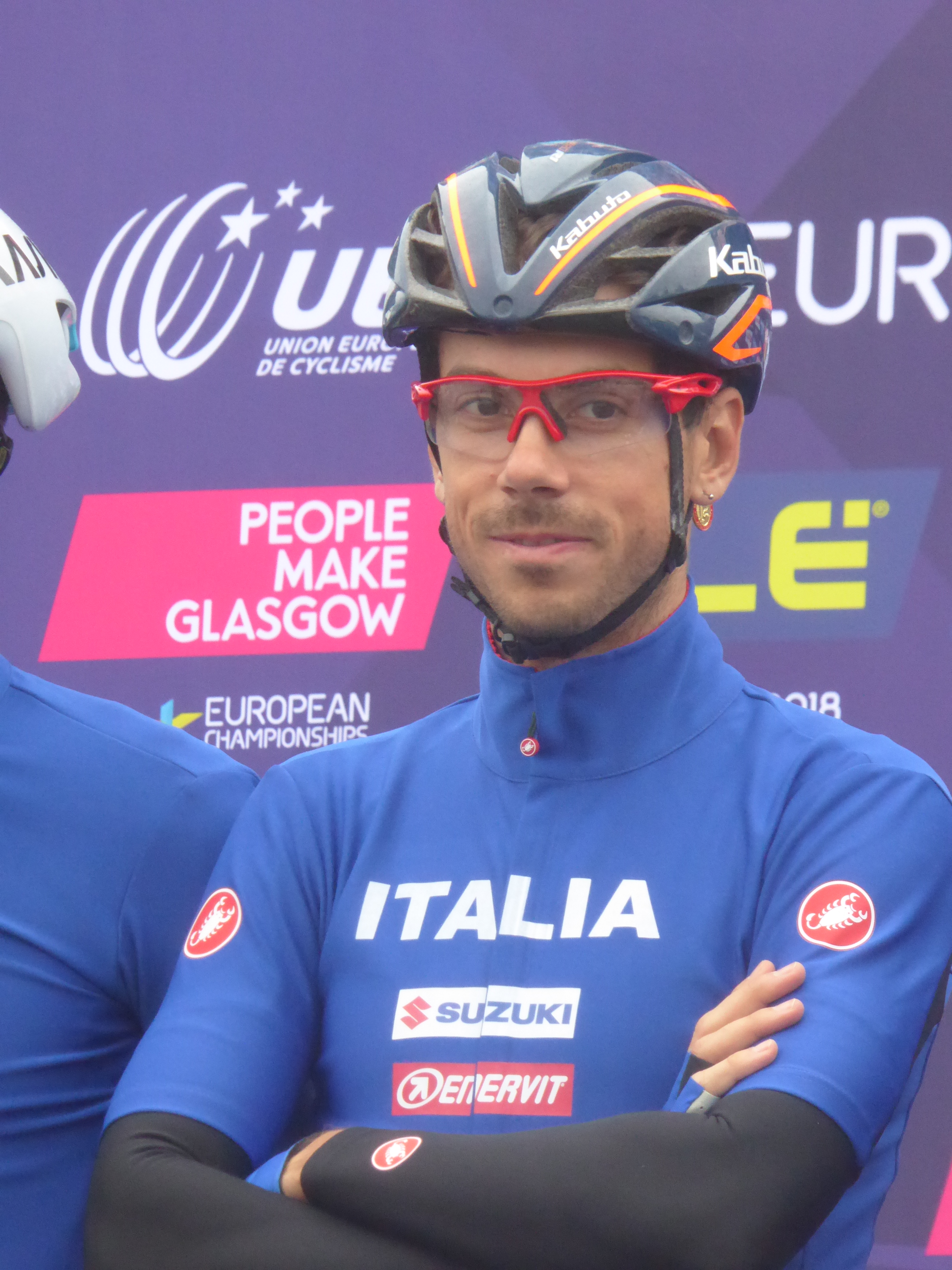
- Canola at the 2018 European Road Cycling Championships

Personal information
- Full name: Marco Canola
- Born: 26 December 1988 (age 37) Vicenza, Italy
- Height: 1.8 m (5 ft 11 in)
- Weight: 66 kg (146 lb)

Cycling career
- Sport: Cycling
- Current team: Retired
- Discipline: Road
- Role: Rider

Amateur team
- 2007–2011: Zalf–Désirée–Fior

Professional teams
- 2012–2014: Colnago–CSF Bardiani
- 2015–2016: UnitedHealthcare
- 2017–2019: Nippo–Vini Fantini
- 2020–2022: Gazprom–RusVelo

Major wins
- Grand Tours Giro d'Italia 1 individual stage (2014) One-day races and Classics Japan Cup (2017)

Marco Canola (born 26 December 1988) is an Italian former racing cyclist, who competed as a professional from 2012 to 2022 with the Bardiani–CSF, UnitedHealthcare, Nippo–Vini Fantini–Faizanè and Gazprom–RusVelo teams. During his professional career, Canola took a total of nine victories – including stage thirteen of the 2014 Giro d'Italia, three stages at the 2017 Tour of Japan, and the 2017 Japan Cup one-day race.

== Major results ==
2009
7th Trofeo Città di Brescia
9th Trofeo Gianfranco Bianchin
2010
3rd Trofeo Zsšdi
3rd Trofeo Alcide De Gasperi
3rd Giro Valli Aretine
6th Giro del Casentino
6th GP Capodarco
7th Gran Premio Palio del Recioto
7th Trofeo Gianfranco Bianchin
10th Trofeo Franco Balestra
2011
1st Overall Giro del Veneto

1st Stage 2

4th Giro Valli Aretine
5th Trofeo Gianfranco Bianchin
2012
1st Stage 7 Tour de Langkawi
1st Stage 1b (TTT) Giro di Padania
2013
10th Gran Premio Nobili Rubinetterie
2014
1st Stage 13 Giro d'Italia
1st Mountains classification, Tirreno–Adriatico
4th Giro di Toscana
2015
1st Mountains classification, Critérium International
5th Overall Dubai Tour
10th Vuelta a Murcia
2016
1st Points classification, Tour de Taiwan
3rd Philadelphia International Cycling Classic
4th Winston-Salem Cycling Classic
2017
1st Japan Cup
1st Volta Limburg Classic
1st Stage 7 Tour of Utah
2nd Coppa Agostoni
3rd Trofeo Matteotti
6th Gran Premio di Lugano
7th Grand Prix of Aargau Canton
7th Gran Premio Bruno Beghelli
8th Overall Tour of Japan

1st Points classification
1st Stages 2, 3 & 5

8th Overall Giro di Toscana
8th Brussels Cycling Classic
8th Coppa Sabatini
2018
2nd Overall Tour du Limousin
2nd GP Industria & Artigianato di Larciano
3rd Grand Prix of Aargau Canton
4th Coppa Sabatini
6th Giro dell'Appennino
6th Japan Cup
2019
1st Stage 4 Tour of Utah
6th Giro dell'Appennino
8th Coppa Sabatini
9th Ronde van Drenthe
2020
7th Giro dell'Appennino
2021
6th Giro della Toscana
8th Overall Deutschland Tour

=== Grand Tour general classification results timeline ===
Grand Tour	2013	2014	2015	2016	2017	2018	2019
Giro d'Italia	139	122	—	—	—	—	107
Tour de France	Did not contest during career						
Vuelta a España	Did not contest during career						

Legend
—	Did not compete
DNF	Did not finish
