= Passeron =

Passeron is a French surname.

Notable people with this surname include:

- Aurélien Passeron (born 1984), French cyclist
- Jean-Claude Passeron (born 1930), French sociologist
