= 2007 Tirreno–Adriatico =

2007 UCI ProTour, race 2 of 26

Race details
- Dates: 14–20 March 2007
- Stages: 7
- Distance: 1,112.5 km (691.3 mi)
- Winning time: 28h 31' 26"

Results
Jersey awarded to the overall winner	Winner	Andreas Klöden (GER)	(Astana)
	Second	Kim Kirchen (LUX)	(T-Mobile Team)
	Third	Alexander Vinokourov (KAZ)	(Astana)
Jersey awarded to the points classification winner	Points	Riccardo Riccò (ITA)	(Saunier Duval–Prodir)
Jersey awarded to the mountains classification winner	Mountains	Salvatore Commesso (ITA)	(Tinkoff Credit Systems)
	Team	(Russia) Tinkoff Credit Systems	

The 2007 Tirreno–Adriatico cycle race took place from 14 March to 20 March 2007. The event was won by German Andreas Klöden of the Astana, who combined good time-trialling and climbing skills to take the race lead on the penultimate stage.

== Teams ==
Twenty-one teams, containing a total of 168 riders, were invited to participate in the race:

- Quick-Step–Innergetic
- AG2R Prévoyance
- Barloworld
- Caisse d'Epargne
- Cofidis
- Ceramica Panaria–Navigare
- Diquigiovanni–Selle Italia
- Euskaltel–Euskadi
- Française des Jeux
- Gerolsteiner
- Team High Road
- Lampre–Fondital
- Liquigas
- Team LPR
- Rabobank
- Saunier Duval–Prodir
- Predictor–Lotto
- Slipstream–Chipotle
- Team CSC
- Team Milram
- Tinkoff Credit Systems

== Route ==
Stage characteristics and winners
Stage	Date	Course	Distance	Type	Winner
1	14 March	Civitavecchia to Civitavecchia	175 km (109 mi)	Flat stage	Robbie McEwen (AUS)
2	15 March	Civitavecchia to Marsciano	205 km (127 mi)	Hilly stage	Alexander Arekeev (RUS)
3	16 March	Marsciano to Macerata	213 km (132 mi)	Hilly stage	Riccardo Riccò (ITA)
4	17 March	Pievebovigliana to Offagna	161 km (100 mi)	Hilly stage	Riccardo Riccò (ITA)
5	18 March	Civitanova Marche to Civitanova Alta	20.5 km (12.7 mi)	Individual time trial	Stefan Schumacher (GER)
6	19 March	San Benedetto del Tronto to San Giacomo	164 km (102 mi)	Medium mountain stage	Matteo Bono (ITA)
7	20 March	Civitella del Tronto to San Benedetto del Tronto	177 km (110 mi)	Flat stage	Koldo Fernández (ESP)

== Stages ==
=== Stage 1 ===
14 March 2007 — Civitavecchia, 175 km (109 mi)

	Cyclist	Team	Time	UCI ProTour Points
1	(Australia) Robbie McEwen	Predictor–Lotto	4h 38' 24"	3 pts
2	(Spain) Óscar Freire	Rabobank	s.t.	2 pts
3	(Norway) Thor Hushovd	Crédit Agricole	s.t.	1 pt

=== Stage 2 ===
15 March 2007 — Civitavecchia to Marsciano, 205 km (127 mi)

	Cyclist	Team	Time	UCI ProTour Points
1	(Russia) Alexander Arekeev	Acqua & Sapone–Caffè Mokambo	4h 51' 41"	N/A
2	(Italy) Daniele Contrini	Tinkoff Credit Systems	+ 29"	N/A
3	(Germany) Sven Krauss	Gerolsteiner	+ 29"	1 pt

=== Stage 3 ===
16 March 2007 — Marsciano to Macerata, 213 km (132 mi)

	Cyclist	Team	Time	UCI ProTour Points
1	(Italy) Riccardo Riccò	Saunier Duval–Prodir	5h 41' 22"	3 pts
2	(Kazakhstan) Alexander Vinokourov	Astana	+ 2"	2 pts
3	(Germany) Andreas Klöden	Astana	+ 2"	1 pt

=== Stage 4 ===
17 March 2007 — Pievebovigliana to Offagna, 161 km (100 mi)

	Cyclist	Team	Time	UCI ProTour Points
1	(Italy) Riccardo Riccò	Saunier Duval–Prodir	3h 50' 22"	3 pts
2	(Germany) Stefan Schumacher	Gerolsteiner	+ 4"	2 pts
3	(Kazakhstan) Alexander Vinokourov	Astana	+ 4"	1 pt

=== Stage 5 ===
18 March 2007 — Civitanova Marche to Civitanova Alta, 20.5 km (12.7 mi) (ITT)

	Cyclist	Team	Time	UCI ProTour Points
1	(Germany) Stefan Schumacher	Gerolsteiner	27' 08"	3 pts
2	(Germany) Andreas Klöden	Astana	+ 1"	2 pts
3	(Luxembourg) Kim Kirchen	T-Mobile Team	+ 6"	1 pt

=== Stage 6 ===
19 March 2007 — San Benedetto del Tronto to San Giacomo, 164 km (102 mi)

	Cyclist	Team	Time	UCI ProTour Points
1	(Italy) Matteo Bono	Lampre–Fondital	4h 25' 07"	3 pts
2	(Italy) Enrico Gasparotto	Liquigas	+ 32"	2 pts
3	(Italy) Giovanni Visconti	Quick-Step–Innergetic	+ 41"	1 pt

=== Stage 7 ===
20 March 2007 — Civitella del Tronto to San Benedetto del Tronto, 177 km (110 mi)

	Cyclist	Team	Time	UCI ProTour Points
1	(Spain) Koldo Fernández	Euskaltel–Euskadi	4h 38' 43"	3 pts
2	(Australia) Stuart O'Grady	Team CSC	s.t.	2 pts
3	(Italy) Gabriele Balducci	Acqua & Sapone–Caffè Mokambo	s.t.	N/A

== Final standings ==
=== General classification ===
	Cyclist	Team	Time	UCI ProTour Points
1	(Germany) Andreas Klöden	Astana	28h 31' 26"	50
2	(Luxembourg) Kim Kirchen	T-Mobile Team	+ 4"	40
3	(Kazakhstan) Alexander Vinokourov	Astana	+ 13"	35
4	(Germany) Stefan Schumacher	Gerolsteiner	+ 23"	30
5	(Slovenia) Janez Brajkovič	Discovery Channel	+ 31"	25
6	(Germany) Jens Voigt	Team CSC	+ 34"	20
7	(Belarus) Vasil Kiryienka	Tinkoff Credit Systems	+ 55"	N/A
8	(Russia) Evgeni Petrov	Tinkoff Credit Systems	+ 59"	N/A
9	(Italy) Michele Scarponi	Acqua & Sapone–Caffè Mokambo	+ 1' 00"	N/A
10	(Netherlands) Michael Boogerd	Rabobank	+ 1' 12"	2

NOTE: UCI ProTour points are not awarded to riders from UCI Professional Continental teams (e.g., Acqua & Sapone–Caffè Mokambo and Tinkoff Credit Systems).

=== Mountains classification ===
	Cyclist	Team	Points
1	(Italy) Salvatore Commesso	Tinkoff Credit Systems	15
2	(Italy) Fortunato Baliani	Ceramica Panaria–Navigare	11
3	(Belarus) Vasil Kiryienka	Tinkoff Credit Systems	6

=== Points classification ===
	Cyclist	Team	Points
1	(Italy) Riccardo Riccò	Saunier Duval–Prodir	32
2	(Italy) Daniele Contrini	Tinkoff Credit Systems	31
3	(Germany) Andreas Klöden	Astana	30

=== Team classification ===
	Team	Country	Time
1	Tinkoff Credit Systems	Italy	85h 37' 54"
2	Astana	Switzerland	+ 1' 07"
3	Caisse d'Epargne	Spain	+ 2' 58"

The following UCI ProTour and UCI Professional Continental teams were named to the 2007 Tirreno–Adriatico:

Nation	UCI Code	Team Name
(Italy)	ASA	Acqua & Sapone–Caffè Mokambo
(France)	A2R	AG2R Prévoyance
(Switzerland)	AST	Astana
(France)	BTL	Bouygues Télécom
(Spain)	GCE	Caisse d'Epargne
(Republic of Ireland)	PAN	Ceramica Panaria–Navigare
(France)	COF	Cofidis
(France)	C.A	Crédit Agricole
(United States)	DSC	Discovery Channel
(Spain)	EUS	Euskaltel–Euskadi
(France)	FDJ	Française des Jeux
(Germany)	GST	Gerolsteiner
(Italy)	LAM	Lampre–Fondital
(Italy)	LIQ	Liquigas
(Belgium)	PRL	Predictor–Lotto
(Belgium)	QSI	Quick-Step–Innergetic
(Netherlands)	RAB	Rabobank
(Spain)	SDV	Saunier Duval–Prodir
(Denmark)	CSC	Team CSC
(Italy)	MRM	Team Milram
(Italy)	TCS	Tinkoff Credit Systems
(Germany)	TMO	T-Mobile Team

== Jersey progress ==
Stage (Winner)	General Classification	Mountains Classification	Points Classification	Team Classification
Stage 1 (Robbie McEwen)	Robbie McEwen	Salvatore Commesso	Robbie McEwen	Team CSC
Stage 2 (Alexandr Arekeev)	Alexandr Arekeev	Fortunato Baliani	Alexandr Arekeev	Acqua & Sapone–Caffè Mokambo
Stage 3 (Riccardo Riccò)	Alexandr Arekeev	Salvatore Commesso	Daniele Contrini	Gerolsteiner
Stage 4 (Riccardo Riccò)	Riccardo Riccò	Salvatore Commesso	Riccardo Riccò	Tinkoff Credit Systems
Stage 5 (Stefan Schumacher)	Stefan Schumacher	Salvatore Commesso	Andreas Klöden	Astana
Stage 6 (Matteo Bono)	Andreas Klöden	Salvatore Commesso	Riccardo Riccò	Tinkoff Credit Systems
Stage 7 (Koldo Fernández)	Andreas Klöden	Salvatore Commesso	Riccardo Riccò	Tinkoff Credit Systems
Final	Andreas Klöden	Salvatore Commesso	Riccardo Riccò	Tinkoff Credit Systems
