= Peugeot (cycling team) =

French professional cycling team (1901–1986)

Peugeot–Shell
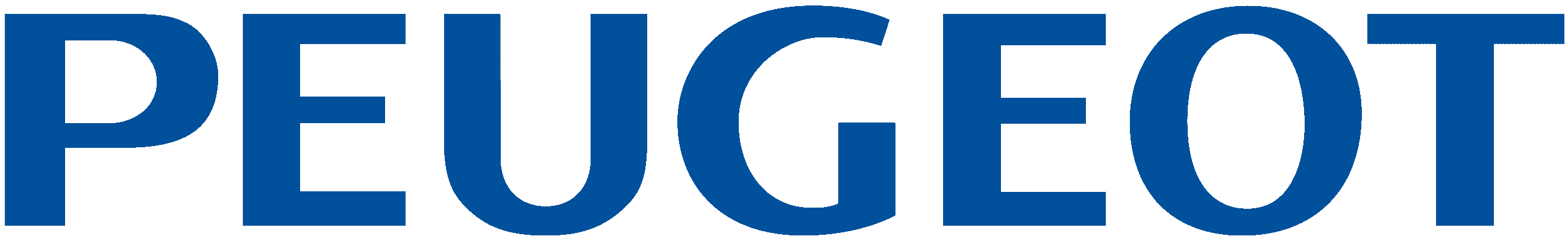

Team information
- Registered: France
- Founded: 1901
- Disbanded: 1986; 40 years ago
- Discipline: Road
- Bicycles: Peugeot

Team name history
- 1901–1904 1905–1924 1925–1955 1956–1962 1963–1964 1965–1975 1976–1981 1982–1985 1986: Peugeot; Peugeot–Wolber; Peugeot–Dunlop; Peugeot–BP–Dunlop; Peugeot–BP–Englebert; Peugeot–BP–Michelin; Peugeot–Esso–Michelin; Peugeot–Shell–Michelin; Peugeot–Shell
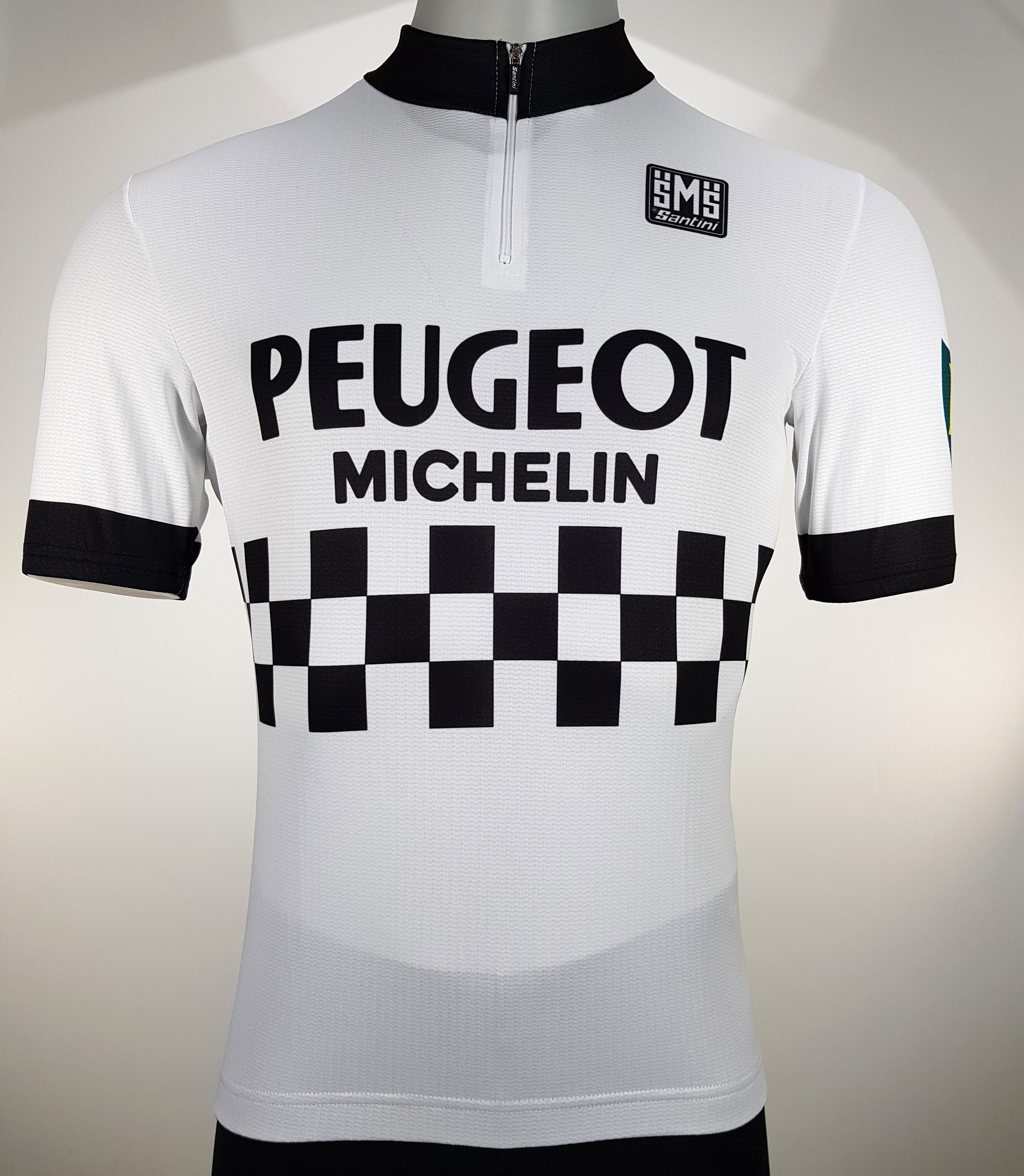
Peugeot jersey
Jersey

Peugeot team was a French professional cycling team that promoted and rode Peugeot racing bikes.

It is listed as the most successful cycling team of all time on cyclingranking.com, with a large margin on the second placed team, Alcyon.

== History ==
Peugeot cycles started producing bicycles in 1882, and from then on it was involved in sponsoring cyclists.

At the beginning of the century a Peugeot cycling team existed. Hippolyte Aucouturier rode Peugeot cycles when he won Paris–Roubaix and Bordeaux–Paris in 1903, and when he was disqualified from the 1904 Tour de France in which he had finished fourth overall, for the illegal use of trains and cars.

But the Peugeot team obtained success for the following four years in the Tour de France with Louis Trousselier, René Pottier and Lucien Petit-Breton. The Peugeot team finished second overall in the 1912 Giro d'Italia. The team would obtain two further victories in the Tour de France with Belgian Philippe Thys before the outbreak of the First World War.

Directly after the war, Peugeot cycles was one of the companies that made a consortium that pooled their resources into a collective cycling team called La Sportive. The objective of forming such a consortium was to keep the sport alive in the poor post-war economic situation.

After three years of the La Sportive consortium, Peugeot re-established its separate cycling team, and with Belgian Firmin Lambot won the 1922 Tour de France. During this time the team was known as the Peugeot team, or sometimes the name of a co-sponsor was added, which occasionally was Wolber, Alcyon, Dunlop, Tedeschi, Bianchi-Pirelli.

From 1936 until 1955 the team was the Peugeot-Dunlop team. Yves Petit-Breton (son of the two time Tour de France winner Lucien Petit-Breton) would be a directeur sportif of the team in 1956.

From 1948 to 1959 there was a Belgian cycling team which was also sponsored by Peugeot, called Elvé-Peugeot.

In 1958, Gaston Plaud became the directeur sportif of Peugeot-BP, where he would stay until the mid seventies. He would direct big names to success, such as Charly Gaul, Pino Cerami, Ferdinand Bracke, Walter Godefroot, Tom Simpson, Jean-Pierre Danguillaume, and the early career of Eddy Merckx.

In 1963 Team Peugeot adopted the black and white checkerboard design, that would be on their white jersey until the team retired from the sport in 1986. During this time the team achieved many successes, such as Tom Simpson winning Bordeaux–Paris in 1963, Milan–San Remo in 1964, and then in 1965 becoming world champion and winning the Giro di Lombardia.

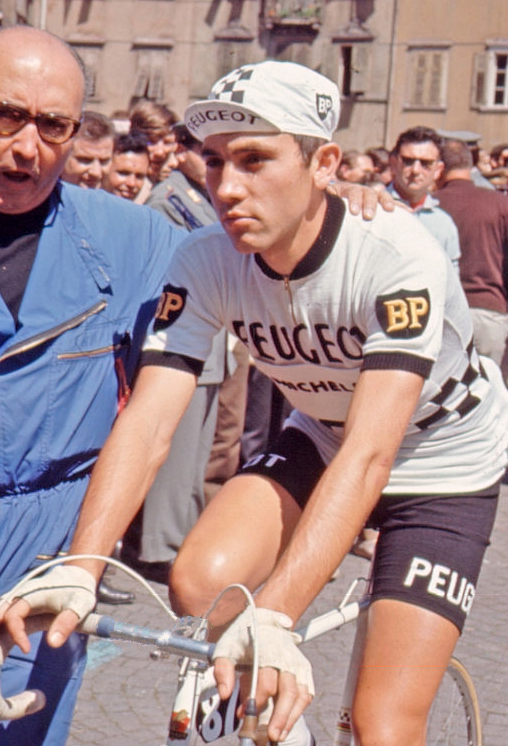
Eddy Merckx riding for Peugeot–BP–Michelin at the 1967 Giro d'Italia

Eddy Merckx rode his first two seasons with the team, and won Milan–San Remo twice, Gent–Wevelgem, La Flèche Wallonne, a stage in the 1967 Giro d'Italia, and the world championships road race with the team, in 1966. In 1967, the Tour de France was disputed by national teams, and one of Peugeot's riders, Roger Pingeon won the race. He would win the 1969 Vuelta a España for the team. The team won the Vuelta a España again, with Ferdinand Bracke in 1971. The name of the team changed in 1965 to Peugeot-BP Michelin, which it stayed until 1976, when Esso took the place of the second sponsor.

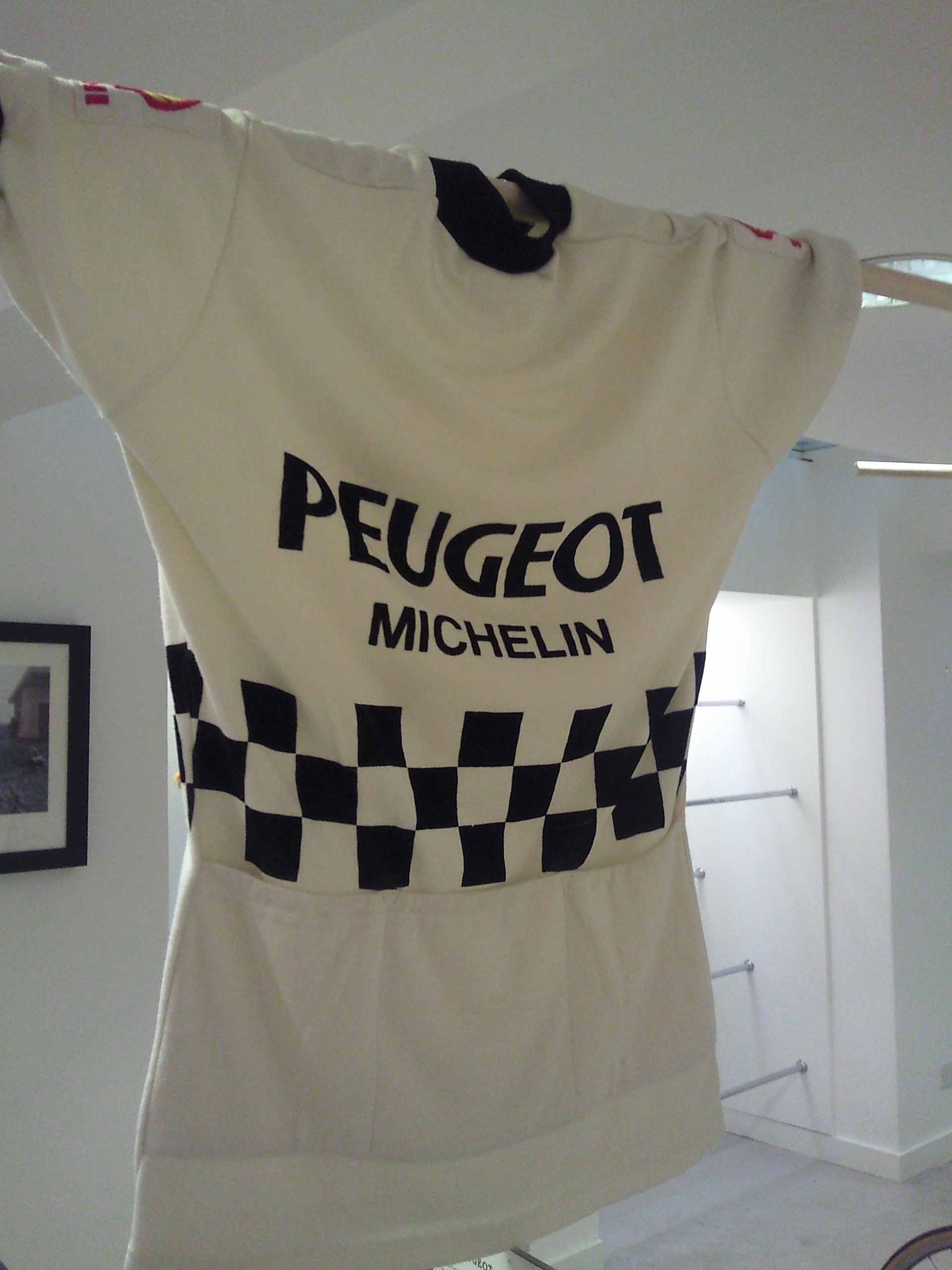
Peugeot team jersey

Maurice De Muer became directeur sportif with the team in 1975, and directed Bernard Thévenet to beat Eddy Merckx, in the 1975 Tour de France. He directed the team until 1982. The last time the team would win the Tour de France would be with Bernard Thévenet, in 1977.

In 1982 Shell became the second sponsor, and until its finish the team was Peugeot-Shell-Michelin.

In the late seventies and early eighties, the team signed many Anglophone riders. Many of these came from a Parisian Amateur club Athletic Club de Boulogne Billencourt (ACBB) that acted as a feeder club for top amateurs to turn professional. Phil Anderson, Robert Millar, Stephen Roche, Sean Yates, and Allan Peiper all started their careers with the Peugeot team. The last time that the team had the yellow jersey of the Tour was the 1983 Tour de France when Pascal Simon wore the jersey, but had to abandon the Tour, due to a broken collarbone. The team had its last chance at a Grand Tour win in the 1985 edition of the Vuelta a España with Robert Millar. Millar was wearing the leader's red jersey on the penultimate day when Pedro Delgado attacked him, to take the stage and the leader's jersey.

In its final year of existence (1986), the team was managed by Roger Legeay. After 1986, Legeay created the Vétements Z-Peugeot team as a continuation of the Peugeot cycling team. Legeay's team was subsequently renamed Z-Peugeot (1988–89), Z-Tomasso (1990), Z (1991–92), GAN (1993–96) and Crédit Agricole (1997–2008), before being disbanded in 2008. Legeay's team is best remembered for being the team which the American cyclist Greg LeMond rode for when he won the Tour de France in 1990 (when the team was known as Z-Tomasso). Other directeur sportifs of the Peugeot cycling team during its existence included: Leon Van der Hulst, Roland Berland, Robert Naeye, Roger Moreau, Jean Lecocq, Camille Narcy, Serge Beucherie, and Jean-François Guiborel.

== Major wins ==
- Tour de France General classification 1905, 1906, 1907, 1908, 1913, 1914, 1922, 1967, 1975, 1977
- Vuelta a España General classification 1948, 1969, 1971
- Tour de France Mountains classification 1984
- World Road Race Championship 1957, 1965, 1967
- World Cyclo-Cross Championship 1961, 1963
- France Road Race Championship 1907, 1908, 1920, 1962, 1973, 1975, 1976
- France Cyclo-Cross Championship 1913, 1914, 1960
- Italy Road Race Championship 1908, 1909, 1910
- Germany Road Race Championship 1965, 1966, 1967, 1971, 1978
- Germany Cyclo-Cross Championship 1961, 1963
- Belgium Road Race Championship 1957, 1972
- Luxembourg Road Race Championship 1936
- Luxembourg Cyclo-Cross Championship 1964, 1967, 1968
- Switzerland Road Race Championship 1914, 1924, 1948, 1949
- Australia Road Race Championship 1984
- Spain Road Race Championship 1948
- Norway Road Race Championship 1984
- Milan–San Remo 1907, 1914, 1918, 1964, 1966, 1967
- Tour of Flanders 1973
- Paris–Roubaix 1904, 1905, 1907, 1913, 1963
- Amstel Gold Race 1983
- Liège–Bastogne–Liège 1949, 1957, 1967
- Grand Prix des Nations 1949, 1962
- Paris–Tours 1906, 1907, 1914, 1917, 1951, 1970
- Giro di Lombardia 1907, 1908, 1917, 1951,
- Paris-Nice 1967
