= Denis Bertolini =

Italian cyclist

Personal information
- Born: 13 December 1977 (age 48) Rovereto, Italy

Cycling career
- Sport: Cycling
- Current team: Retired
- Discipline: Road
- Role: Rider

Professional teams
- 2002–2003: Phonak
- 2004–2006: Acqua & Sapone
- 2007–2009: Diquigiovanni–Selle Italia

Denis Bertolini (born 13 December 1977 in Rovereto) is an Italian former professional road racing cyclist.

== Major results ==
2001
1st Road race, Mediterranean Games
2004
1st Stages 2 & 6 Circuit de Lorraine
1st Stage 2 Peace Race
