= Cycling at the 2001 Mediterranean Games =

The cycling competition at the 2001 Mediterranean Games was a men-only competition. Track events were absent from the programme and the only two events were an individual time trial and an individual road race.

== Men's competition ==
=== Individual time trial ===
- Over 39.3 kilometres

Rank	Final Ranking	Time
1st place, gold medalist(s)	Sergi Escobar (ESP)	49:52.14
2nd place, silver medalist(s)	Juri Alvisi (ITA)	49:59.74
3rd place, bronze medalist(s)	Maurizio Biondo (ITA)	50:35.24
4.	Mitja Kotnik (SLO)	50:56.64
5.	Nicolas L’Hote (FRA)	51:31.15
6.	Ioannis Tamouridis (GRE)	51:35.41
7.	Mitja Mahoric (SLO)	51:47.60
8.	Carlo Meneghetti (FRA)	52:36.63

=== Individual road race ===
- Over 150 kilometres

Rank	Final Ranking	Time
1st place, gold medalist(s)	Denis Bertolini (ITA)	3:52:27
2nd place, silver medalist(s)	Alberto Loddo (ITA)	3:52:27
3rd place, bronze medalist(s)	Alejandro Valverde (ESP)	3:52.34
4.	Franck Laurance (FRA)	3:52.34
5.	Sebastiano Scotti (ITA)	3:52.34
6.	Stare Matej (SLO)	3:52.34
7.	Darko Mrvar (SLO)	3:52.34
8.	Jaume Rovira (ESP)	3:52.34
9.	Nicola Pavone (ITA)	3:52.34
10.	Mitja Mahoric (SLO)	3:52.34
11.	Radoslav Rogina (CRO)	3:52.34

== Medal table ==
Place	Nation	1st place, gold medalist(s)	2nd place, silver medalist(s)	3rd place, bronze medalist(s)	Total
1	Italy	1	2	1	4
2	Spain	1	0	1	2
Total		2	2	2	6
