= Andrei Kunitski =

Belarusian cyclist

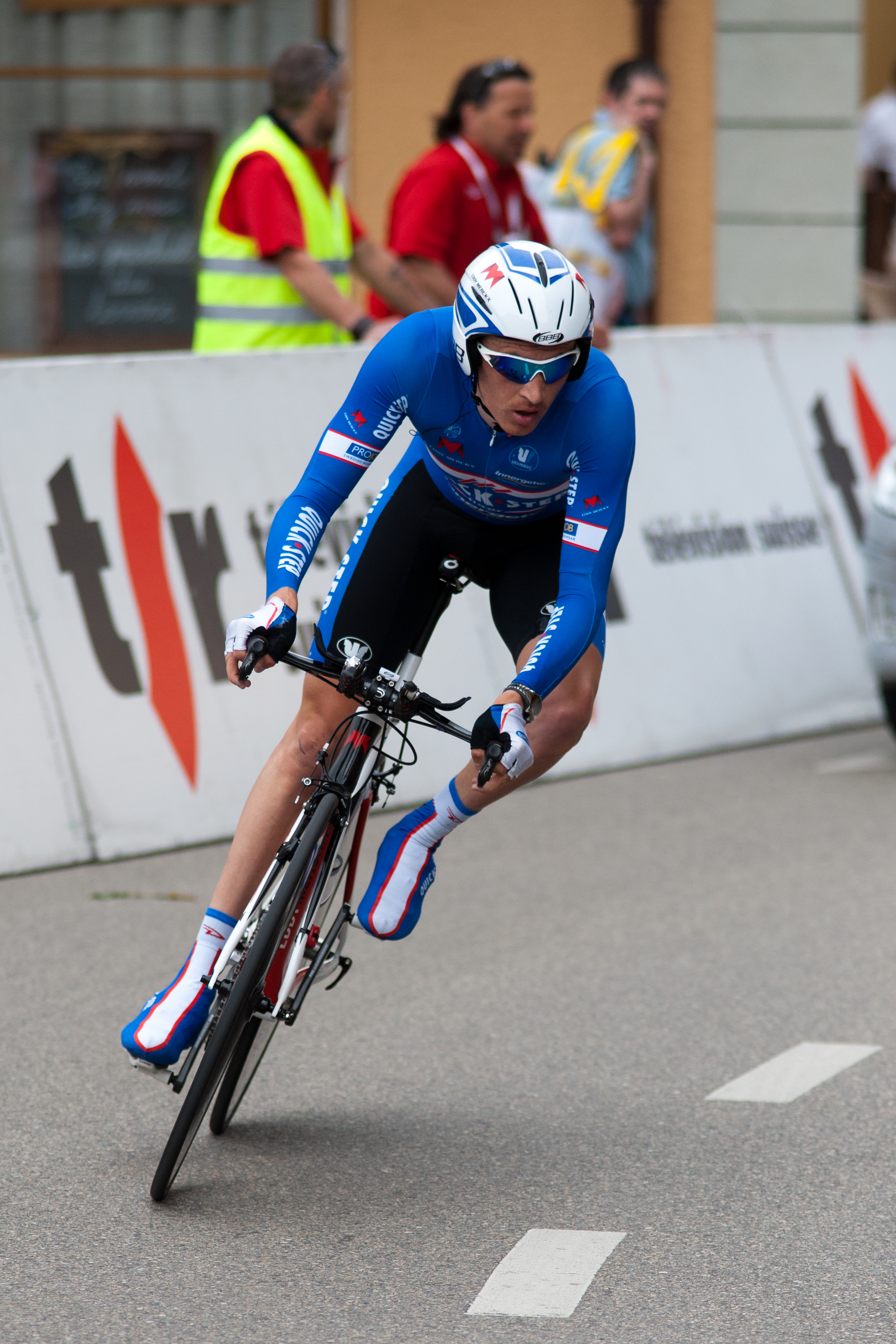
- Kunitski at the 2010 Tour de Romandie

Personal information
- Full name: Andrei Kunitski
- Born: 2 July 1984 (age 42) Hrodna, Byelorussian SSR, Soviet Union

Cycling career
- Sport: Cycling
- Discipline: Road
- Role: Rider

Amateur team
- 2006: Acqua & Sapone (stagiaire)

Professional teams
- 2007–2008: Acqua & Sapone–Caffè Mokambo
- 2009: Amica Chips–Knauf
- 2009–2010: Quick-Step

Major wins
- National Time Trial Champion (2007, 2008); 1st stage Vuelta Ciclista a Burgos (2008)

Andrei Kunitski (Belarusian: Андрэй Куніцкі; born 2 July 1984 in Grodno) is a Belarusian professional road bicycle racer. He last rode for UCI ProTeam Quick-Step, having ridden professionally for Acqua & Sapone–Caffè Mokambo between 2007 and 2008 and a brief stint for Amica Chips–Knauf in 2009. Kunitski has won the National Time Trial Championship of Belarus in 2007 and 2008.

== Palmarès ==
2007
1st National Time Trial Champion
2008
1st National Time Trial Champion
1st Stage 1 Vuelta Ciclista a Burgos
