= Alejandro Valverde =

Spanish cyclist (born 1980)

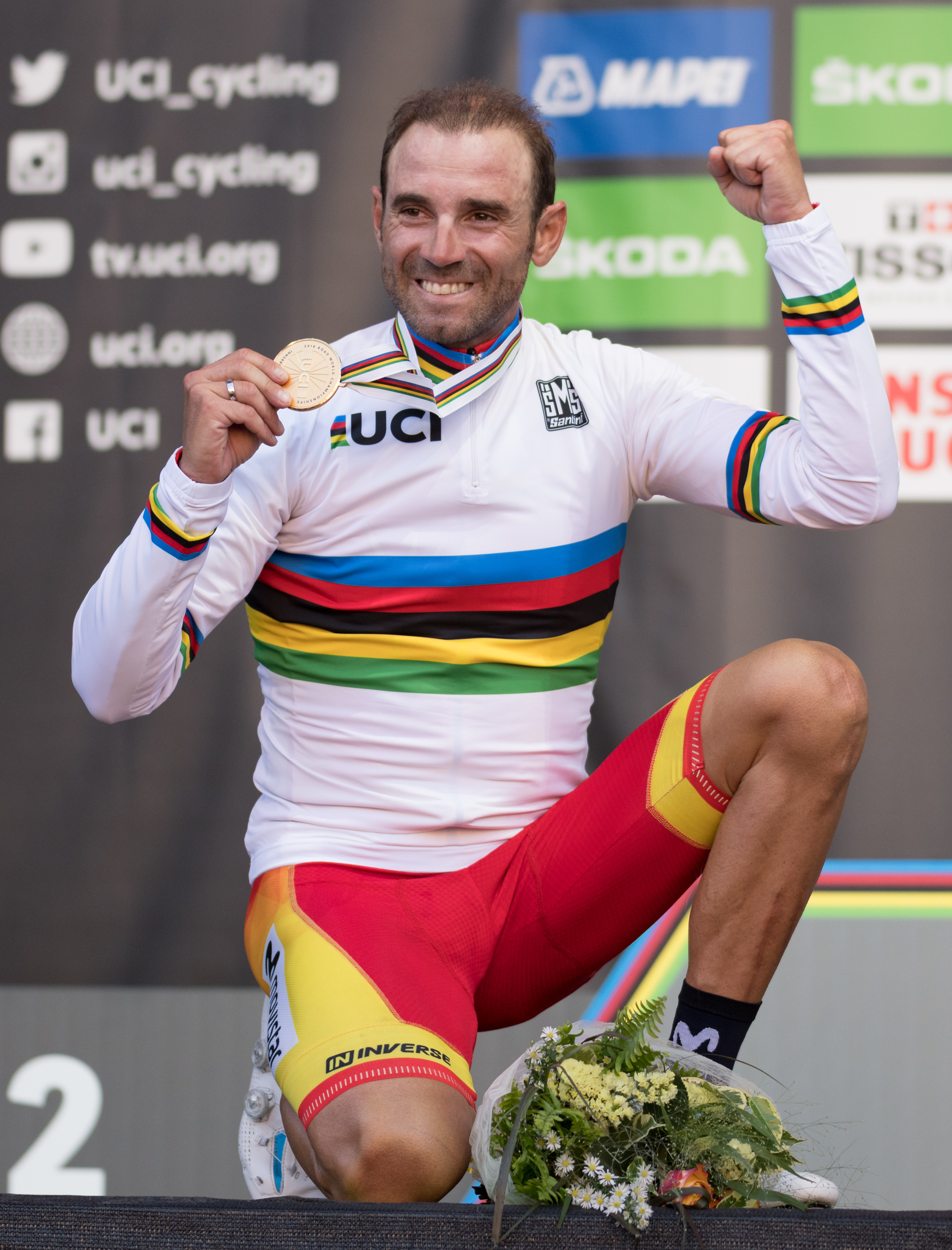
- Valverde at the 2018 UCI Road World Championships

Personal information
- Full name: Alejandro Valverde Belmonte
- Nicknames: Balaverde (The Green Bullet); El Bala (The Bullet); El Imbatido (The Unbeaten)
- Born: 25 April 1980 (age 46) Las Lumbreras, Murcia, Spain
- Height: 1.77 m (5 ft 10 in)
- Weight: 61 kg (134 lb)

Cycling career
- Sport: Cycling
- Current team: Movistar Team Gravel Squad
- Disciplines: Road (retired); Gravel
- Role: Rider
- Rider type: All-rounder

Amateur teams
- 1989–1998: Puente Tocinos
- 1999: Banesto Amateur
- 2000–2001: Kelme–Costa Blanca Amateur
- 2023–: Movistar Team Gravel Squad

Professional teams
- 2002–2004: Kelme–Costa Blanca
- 2005–2010: Illes Balears–Banesto
- 2012–2022: Movistar Team

Major wins
- Grand Tours Tour de France 4 individual stages (2005, 2008, 2012) Giro d'Italia 1 individual stage (2016) Vuelta a España General classification (2009) Points classification (2012, 2013, 2015, 2018) Combination classification (2003, 2009, 2012) 12 individual stages (Note: Valverde has won 12 stages over a period of 10 races at the Vuelta a España. He won two stages in 2003, 2012, and 2018, and one each in 2004, 2006, 2008, 2014, 2015, and 2019) 2 TTT stages (2012, 2014) Stage races Critérium du Dauphiné (2008, 2009) Volta a Catalunya (2009, 2017, 2018) Tour of the Basque Country (2017) Abu Dhabi Tour (2018) Vuelta a Andalucía (2012, 2013, 2014, 2016, 2017) Vuelta a Burgos (2004, 2009) Volta a la Comunitat Valenciana (2004, 2007, 2018) One-day races and Classics World Road Race Championships (2018) National Road Race Championships (2008, 2015, 2019) National Time Trial Championships (2014) Liège–Bastogne–Liège (2006, 2008, 2015, 2017) La Flèche Wallonne (2006, 2014, 2015, 2016, 2017) Clásica de San Sebastián (2008, 2014) Giro del Lazio/Roma Maxima (2014) GP Miguel Induráin (2014, 2018, 2021) Other UCI ProTour (2006, 2008) UCI World Tour (2014, 2015) UCI World Ranking (2018) Vélo d'Or (2018)
Medal record
Representing Spain
Men's road bicycle racing
World Championships
Gold medal – first place	2018 Innsbruck	Road race
Silver medal – second place	2003 Hamilton	Road race
Silver medal – second place	2005 Madrid	Road race
Bronze medal – third place	2006 Salzburg	Road race
Bronze medal – third place	2012 Valkenburg	Road race
Bronze medal – third place	2013 Florence	Road race
Bronze medal – third place	2014 Ponferrada	Road race
Mediterranean Games
Bronze medal – third place	2001 Tunis	Road race

Alejandro Valverde Belmonte (born 25 April 1980) is a Spanish cyclist, who competed as a professional in road bicycle racing from 2002 to 2010 and from 2012 to 2022, and now competes in gravel cycling for the Movistar Team Gravel Squad. Since March 2025, he has been the coach of the men's Spanish national team.

During his road racing career, Valverde took 133 professional victories, with some of his biggest wins having been the Vuelta a España in 2009, the Critérium du Dauphiné in 2008 and 2009, the Tour of the Basque Country in 2017, the Volta a Catalunya in 2009, 2017 and 2018, Liège–Bastogne–Liège in 2006, 2008, 2015 and 2017, La Flèche Wallonne in 2006, 2014, 2015, 2016 and 2017, the Clásica de San Sebastián in 2008 and 2014, the 2006 and 2008 UCI ProTours, the 2014 and 2015 UCI World Tours, and the road race in the 2018 World Championships. Prior to his Worlds win, he already held the record for most medals won at World Championships – he twice collected the silver medal in the World Championships, in 2003 and 2005, as well as the bronze four times in 2006, 2012, 2013 and 2014. Valverde entered thirty-two Grand Tours, finished twenty-seven of them and placed in the top ten of the general classification on twenty occasions. He also shares the record for most wins in the Points classification in the Vuelta a España (four times) with Sean Kelly and Laurent Jalabert.

Valverde is rare in combining different specialties in road bicycle racing, being a strong climbing specialist, sprinter and a good time-trialist. The online database Cycling Ranking ranks him as the 2nd most successful cyclist of all time.

== Biography ==
Born in Las Lumbreras, Murcia, Valverde came from a cycling family, his father Juan was an amateur bicycle racer and bought him a bike when he was six years old. His brother Juan Francisco was also an amateur road racing cyclist. Valverde's first race was in Jumilla, in his region of Murcia, and he finished second. On the following week he won his second race in Yecla. He allegedly took more than fifty consecutive victories between 11 and 13 years old, earning him the nickname El Imbatido (The Unbeaten).

=== Amateur career ===
Due to his many wins, Valverde was offered to ride for the elite amateur team Banesto based in Navarre, some distance away from his home in Murcia. Perhaps due to the exhaustion from having to travel back and forth every weekend, his performance suffered while with the team.

He moved to the development team of the Kelme–Costa Blanca professional squad and was coached by Francisco Moya, whom he credited with helping him become a better cyclist. Kelme also promised to allow him to move to the professional squad if he showed good performance. At the end of his first season with the Kelme amateur squad, they offered to move him to the professional squad.

=== Kelme (2002–2004) ===
Valverde turned professional in 2002 when he signed a contract with the Spanish team Kelme–Costa Blanca, with whom he stayed until the end of the 2004 season. During his time with Kelme he had a breakthrough year in the 2003 Vuelta a España, where he won two stages and finished third in the General classification. That year he also won the Vuelta a Mallorca and a stage in Tour of the Basque Country and other Spanish races like GP Primavera and GP Villafranca de Ordizia. He ended the season with a second place in the 2003 UCI Road World Championships behind Igor Astarloa after winning the sprint ahead of Peter Van Petegem and Paolo Bettini.

In the 2004 season he decided to stay with Kelme despite the team's financial woes and offers from other teams. He went on to win the Volta a la Comunitat Valenciana, the Vuelta a Murcia, a stage in the Tour of the Basque Country, the Vuelta a Burgos and taking fourth in the Vuelta a España. Although he won a stage in the Vuelta, he was injured in a crash that forced him to downscale his ambitions in the overall classification. He also participated in the Summer Olympics.

=== Caisse d'Epargne/Movistar (2005–2022) ===
==== 2005 ====
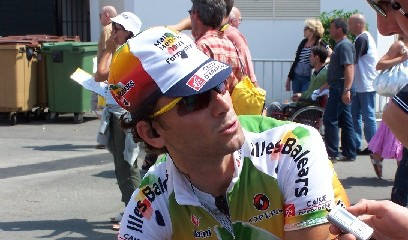
Valverde at the 2005 Tour de France

Valverde joined the UCI ProTeam Illes Balears–Caisse d'Epargne in 2005. He won the last stage in Paris–Nice and finished second overall behind Bobby Julich. He also took two stages in the Tour of the Basque Country. In his first ever appearance at the Tour de France, he won the 10th stage of the Tour de France ahead of Lance Armstrong, whom he beat in the sprint into Courchevel at the end of a mountain stage in the Alps. After Stage 12, he was in 5th place on GC, 3 minutes and 16 seconds behind Armstrong. He was also leading in the young rider classification (white jersey), with a 3-minute and 9 second lead on Armstrong's teammate Yaroslav Popovych. However, Valverde was forced to withdraw from the Tour during the 13th stage because of a knee injury. Valverde recovered barely in time for the UCI Road World Championships in Madrid, Spain. The injury of Óscar Freire, who was the Spanish team captain, forced him to become the team leader, despite having had only one day of competition before the Worlds. Amazingly, he was able to be competitive and finished second to winner Tom Boonen.

==== 2006 ====
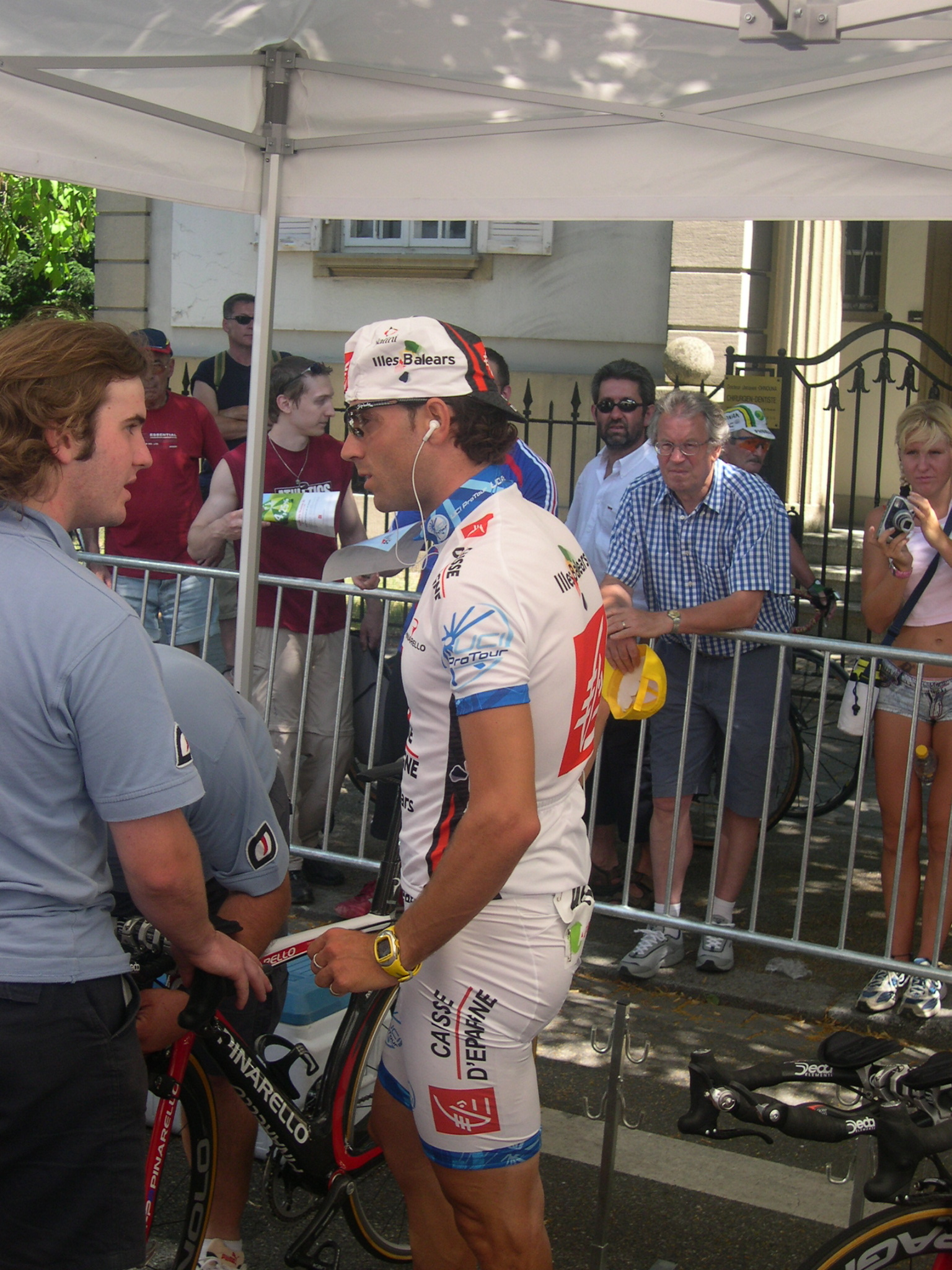
Valverde at the 2006 Tour de France

In 2006, Valverde won a stage in the Tour of the Basque Country, finishing 2nd overall and capturing the points competition. He then completed a prestigious double in the Spring classics, winning La Flèche Wallonne and taking victory four days later at Liège–Bastogne–Liège. Valverde subsequently won a stage in the Tour de Romandie finishing 3rd overall. Valverde planned to challenge at the 2006 Tour de France, and stated that he hoped to win in the future. He went to the Pinarello bicycle factory in Treviso, Italy, to optimize his time-trialing performance. In fact he started among the favourites for the Tour after the withdrawal of Jan Ullrich and Ivan Basso due to a doping investigation. However, on the third stage of the race, Valverde crashed, and had to abandon the Tour with a fractured right collarbone. His ambition to win a Grand Tour shifted to the Vuelta a España, later that year.

Valverde entered the Vuelta a España as the top favorite. Since he did not ride a full Tour de France he was in better condition than some of the other candidates for the victory: defending champion Denis Menchov and Carlos Sastre both ended in the top 10 of the Tour de France and were expected to be somewhat fatigued. Valverde won the 7th stage and dominated mountain stages, earning him the gold leader jersey after stage 9. Valverde lost the jersey, however, due to the aggressive climbing and attacking of Alexander Vinokourov. In the last time trial, Valverde again lost time on Vinokourov and had to settle for the 2nd place in the overall standings, his second podium finish in a Grand Tour. Following his impressive performance in the Vuelta, Valverde won yet another major title, winning the UCI ProTour with several major races still left on the calendar as his point lead had reached unassailable levels. At the UCI Road World Championships, Valverde was considered one of the favorites for the title. Although he did not win, he was able to finish 3rd and claim a bronze medal.

==== 2007 ====
He started 2007 by winning the overall classification at Volta a la Comunitat Valenciana and Vuelta a Murcia. In stage 4 of the Vuelta a Murcia, Valverde accomplished his first win in an individual time trial. He also finished third in the Critérium International and fifth in the Tour of the Basque Country. In the Ardennes classics he took second place in both La Flèche Wallonne and Liège–Bastogne–Liège, unable to repeat the double victory of 2006 season. In the Tour de France, Valverde was seen as one of the favorites for the yellow jersey until he had a disastrous individual time trial that diminished his chances of fighting for the overall classification. He subsequently finished sixth overall, eleven minutes behind, and thus finished his first Tour de France after being unable to complete the race in 2005 and 2006. He decided not to race the Vuelta a España in order to prepare for the UCI Road World Championships.

On 29 August 2007, the UCI announced that they prevented Valverde from riding the World Championships in Stuttgart because of his possible implication in the Operación Puerto doping case to safeguard the atmosphere and reputation of the World Championships. The UCI also called upon the Spanish Cycling Federation (RFEC) to open disciplinary proceedings against the rider, but RFEC refused to comply with the UCI's request, saying there was no new evidence against him. RFEC also included Valverde in its squad for the World Championships, where he ended up 2nd. The matter was taken to the Court of Arbitration for Sport, which authorised Valverde to participate in the World Championships.

==== 2008 ====
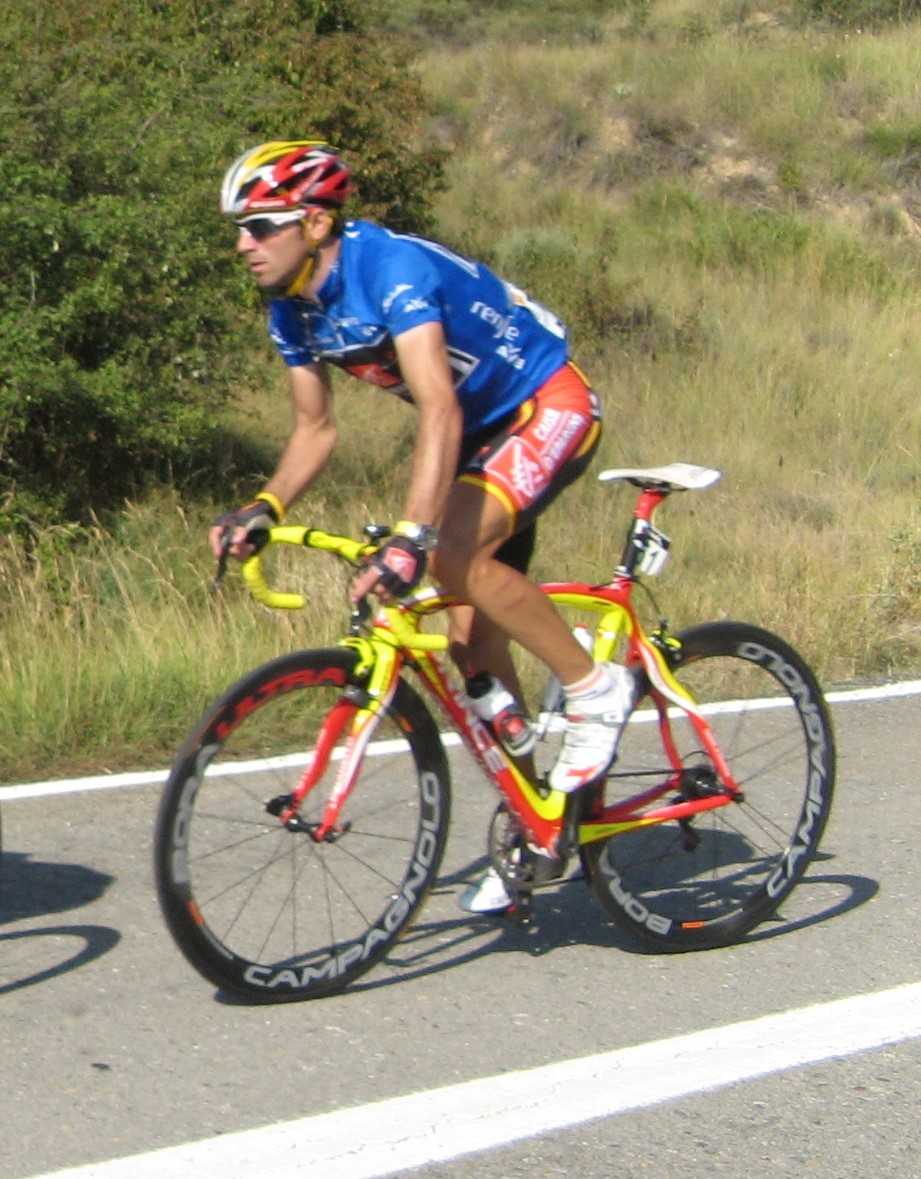
Valverde at the 2008 Vuelta a España, wearing the blue jersey of points classification leader.

In 2008, Valverde showed strong form in the spring. After winning the Vuelta a Murcia, Valverde was focused on training. He announced his readiness with a podium finish in the Klasika Primavera and a triumph at the Paris–Camembert. These successes foreshadowed excellent results in the Ardennes classics: a podium at the Amstel Gold Race and victory in Liège–Bastogne–Liège. Valverde also won the Critérium du Dauphiné Libéré and the Spanish National Road Race Championships in June. On 5 July, Valverde won the first stage of the Tour de France. His form faltered in the Pyrenees, and after being dropped on the Col du Tourmalet, eventually losing 5' 52" to stage winner Leonardo Piepoli, scrapping hopes of a podium finish. He performed better in the Alps and claimed a top ten finish. On Alpe d'Huez it appeared that he was working alongside CSC–Saxo Bank to try to eliminate Cadel Evans.

He followed the Tour with a strong victory in the Clásica de San Sebastián, leading out the sprint and holding off Alexandr Kolobnev and Davide Rebellin. Later, at the Vuelta a España, he started strong, winning the second stage and wearing the general classification leader's jersey on the third one. He was among the leaders in the first week. However, he lost around two minutes on a very wet stage to Saunces and any chance of a podium finish. However, he ended up in fourth position overall at the end with some strong performances including an impressive ride up the Angliru, where he was only bettered by Alberto Contador and then a good performance in the mountain time-trial. Before the participation at the UCI Road World Championships at Varese, he was mathematically proclaimed the UCI ProTour winner, being his second win in the four editions of the competition.

==== 2009 ====
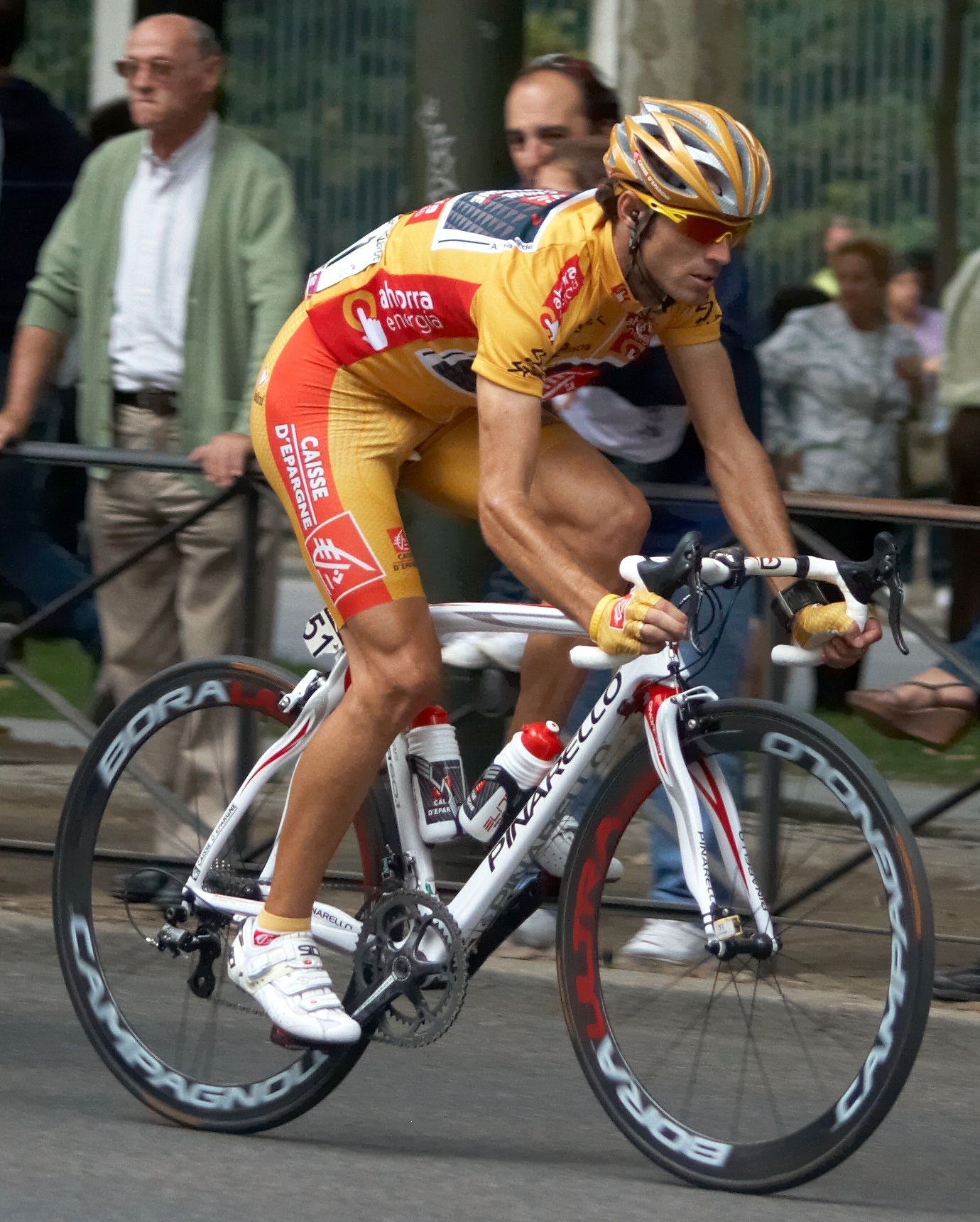
Valverde wearing the leader's jersey at the 2009 Vuelta a España

Valverde started 2009 in good form by taking the points and mountains classifications in the Vuelta a Castilla y León while finishing 9th overall with two stage victories. He could not repeat his successes of the last few years in the spring classics with his best result being a 7th at La Flèche Wallonne. He won the Klasika Primavera and the Volta a Catalunya to put those disappointments behind him. With the threat of not racing the Tour de France hanging over his head he entered the Critérium du Dauphiné Libéré hoping to prove his worth. He performed consistently throughout the two early time-trials to stay in touch with the leaders before finishing second on Mont Ventoux to take the lead in the overall classification. Though Cadel Evans repeatedly attacked him in the final days he stayed on his wheel, with the help of compatriot Alberto Contador, to take the yellow jersey. On the back of these successes he appealed his ban by the Italian authorities with the Court of Arbitration for Sport in the hope of racing the tour.

On 20 September 2009, Valverde clinched the overall victory in the Vuelta a España. Despite having no stage victories, Valverde's consistency in the mountains allowed him to keep the leader's jersey all the way to end, after capturing it on stage 9.

==== 2010 ====
All his 2010 results were annulled because of the suspension.

==== 2012 ====
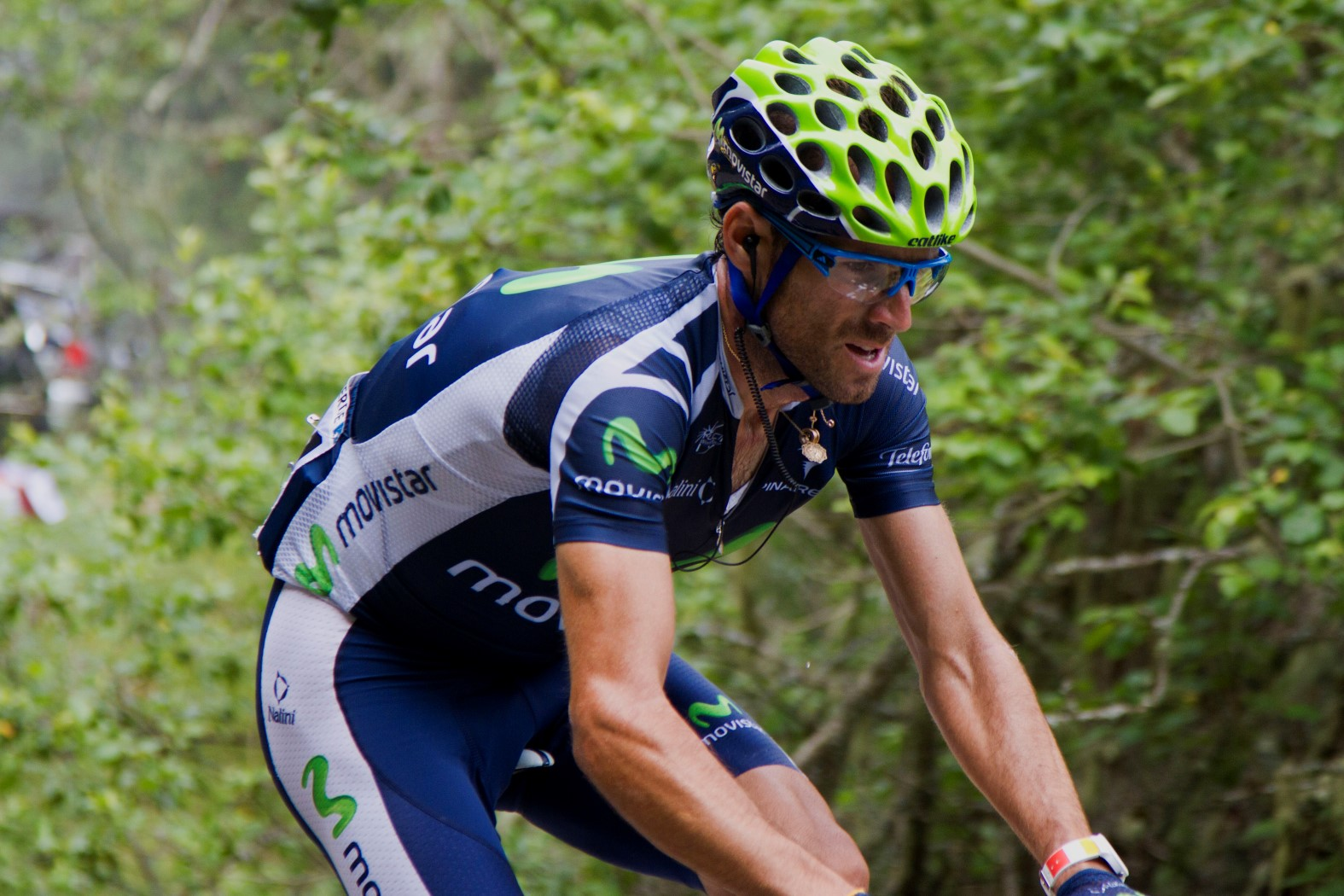
Valverde at the 2012 Tour de France; he won the seventeenth stage of the race.

Valverde made his return to the peloton during the Tour Down Under, the first race of the UCI World Tour season. He won the race's fifth stage – the queen stage of the event – by out-sprinting GreenEDGE's Simon Gerrans in a two-man sprint in Willunga, and finished second overall. He earned his first overall victory since his return, by winning February's Vuelta a Andalucía, as well as achieving a stage victory during the race. Valverde also finished third in Paris–Nice, and by winning stage 3 showed good form for the upcoming Tour de France. In the Tour de France he sat casually in the peloton until initiating a breakaway in stage 17, which he held onto after breaking away from the other 16 riders in the breakaway. Team Sky almost chased him down, ending only 19 seconds adrift; it was Valverde's fourth Tour de France stage victory.

Valverde entered the Vuelta a España as a lieutenant to the defending champion Juan José Cobo in the Movistar Team. However, Valverde would soon become the leader when it became apparent that Cobo was not in top form. His Movistar Team started off with a victory in the first stage, a team time trial. Valverde would take the lead of the general, points and combination classifications after winning Stage 3, in which he chased down repeated attacks from Alberto Contador and outsprinted Joaquim Rodríguez at the finishing line. He would subsequently lose the lead to Rodríguez, but won the eighth stage atop the Collada de la Gallina in Andorra. Contador broke away from the small lead group and looked like he was heading for the win, but Rodríguez and Valverde passed him with less than 100 m (330 ft) to go, with Valverde taking the win. Valverde ultimately finished the Vuelta in second position overall after being a constant threat for the leader, which was Rodríguez until stage 17 where Contador soloed to victory and grabbed the lead, which he would not relinquish. Valverde won both the points and combination classification jerseys on the final day from Rodríguez as a result of a sixth-place finish on the last stage in Madrid.

Valverde had to settle for a bronze medal in the World Championships in Valkenburg, as he was unable to reach Philippe Gilbert who attacked on the final climb of the Cauberg. He was the first of a group of 27 riders who had a five seconds deficit on the Belgian when crossing the line. He was supposed to participate in the Giro di Lombardia, but announced on the morning of the race that he was suffering from influenza and was putting an end to his 2012 season.

==== 2013 ====
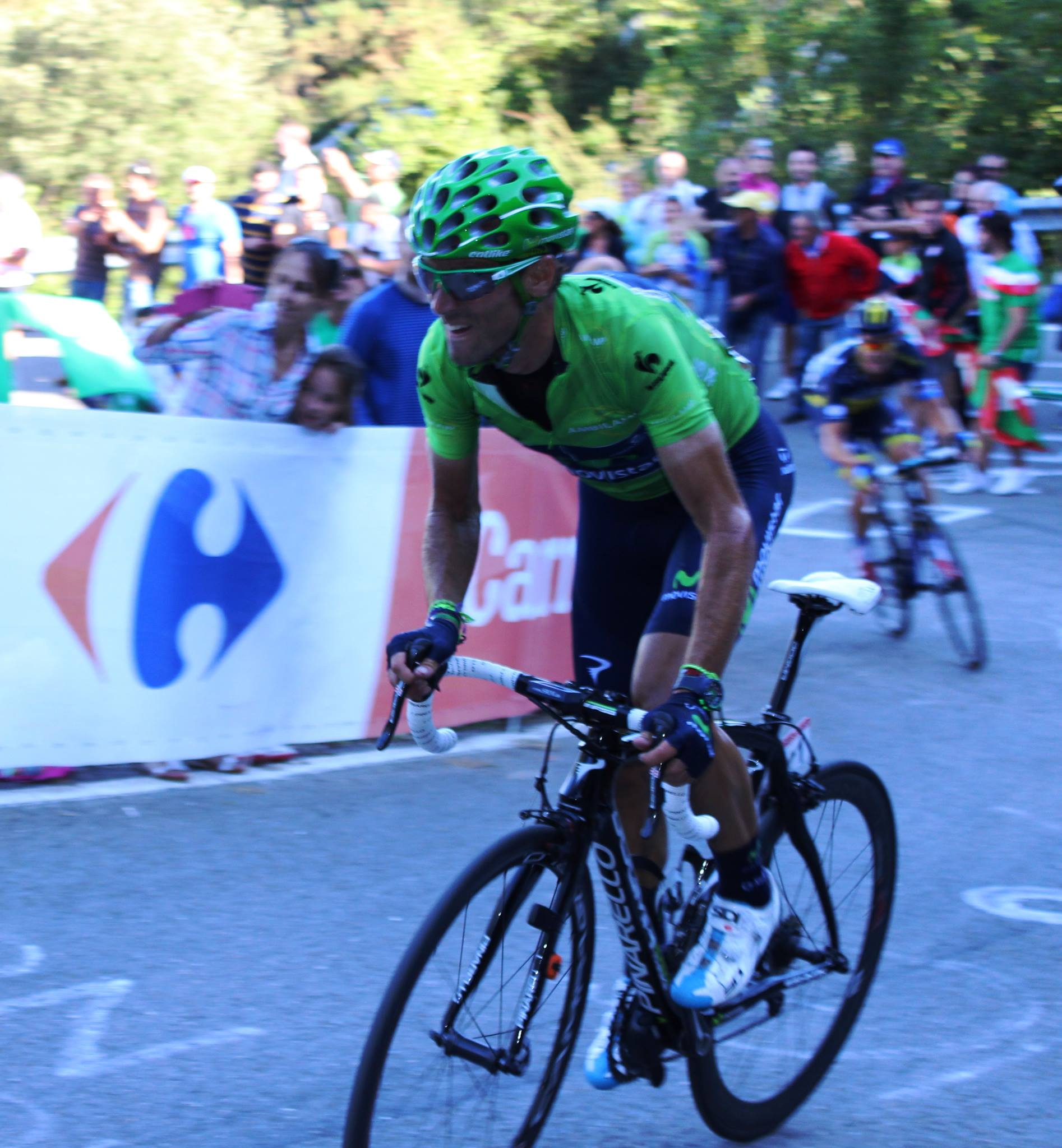
Valverde, wearing the green jersey of points classification leader, at the 2013 Vuelta a España

As in 2012, Valverde won the overall classification of the Vuelta a Andalucía in 2013, where he also won the points classification in the race. Valverde continued showing some good form after finishing with podium places in the Vuelta a Murcia, the Amstel Gold Race and in Liège–Bastogne–Liège. After having a decent spring campaign, Valverde aimed for a podium finish in the Tour de France. Valverde started the Tour in good form after finishing third in Ax3 Domaines behind Chris Froome and Richie Porte. However, the next day, Porte lost over 15 minutes which moved Valverde into second overall right before the tour left the Pyrenees. On Stage 13, Valverde lost almost 10 minutes after getting a flat tyre. Despite a very hard pursuit, the high crosswinds and the pace of the peloton prevented him and his teammates from catching back. They ended up with the second group at the finish causing him to slip out of the top ten. Despite losing his second position, Valverde managed to do well in the Alps which moved him back into the top ten of the overall standings, finishing 8th overall.

At the Vuelta a España, after stage 10, Valverde sat fourth overall a minute behind race leader Chris Horner. However, on stage 11, he moved back up into 3rd after finishing 8th in the time trial. On stage 14, on a rainy descent, Valverde was dropped by the G.C. contenders entering the final climb a minute back. He managed to limit his losses on the final climb staying within a minute of his rivals, though losing close to a minute on Nibali, Horner, and Joaquim Rodríguez. On stage 16, he managed to cut back a handful of seconds on Nibali and Horner. He entered the penultimate stage 20 a minute behind the race leader. He came third of the stage which finished atop the steep Alto de l'Angliru, securing a podium finish in the general classification, one minute and 36 seconds behind race winner Horner. At the World Championships, he took the third place, but was criticized for failing to cover the late attack of Portuguese Rui Costa. Costa eventually reached and out sprinted Rodríguez, Valverde's Spanish teammate.

==== 2014 ====
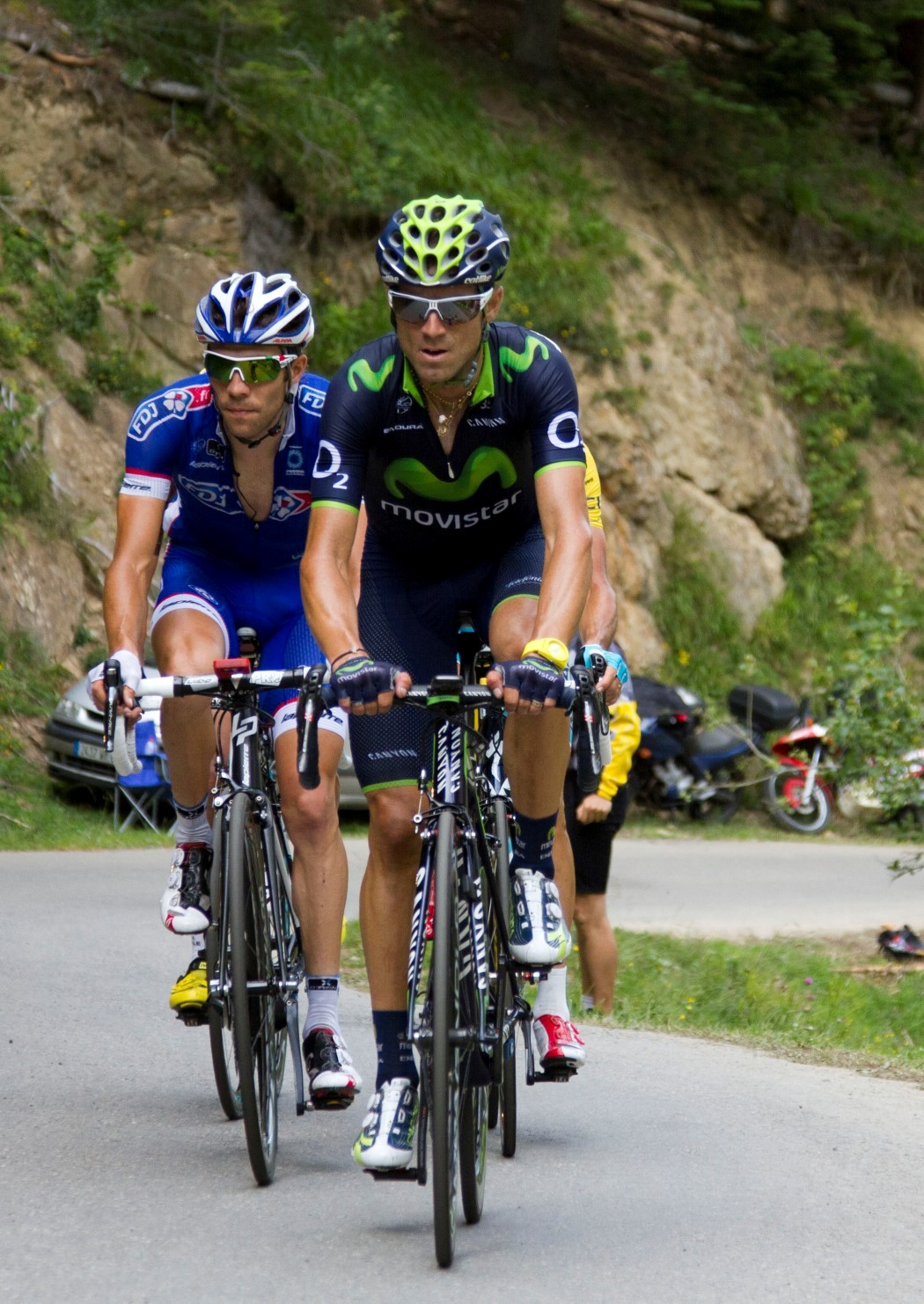
Valverde (right) at the 2014 Tour de France

In the Tour de France, Valverde ended in fourth place in the general classification. On 2 August 2014 Valverde won the Clásica de San Sebastián for the second time in his career. He won the first uphill finish of the Vuelta a España by powering away from the leaders after leading the group for most of the final climb. He finished the Spanish Grand Tour on the third step of the podium behind Chris Froome and the overall winner Alberto Contador. After the Vuelta, it was announced that Valverde had signed a three-year contract with his Movistar Team, meaning that he would ride for them until at least 2017. At the World Road Race Championships in Ponferrada, Valverde stood on the third step on the podium for the third year in a row. He came in second at the Giro di Lombardia, passing Contador for first place in the UCI World Tour rankings.

==== 2015 ====
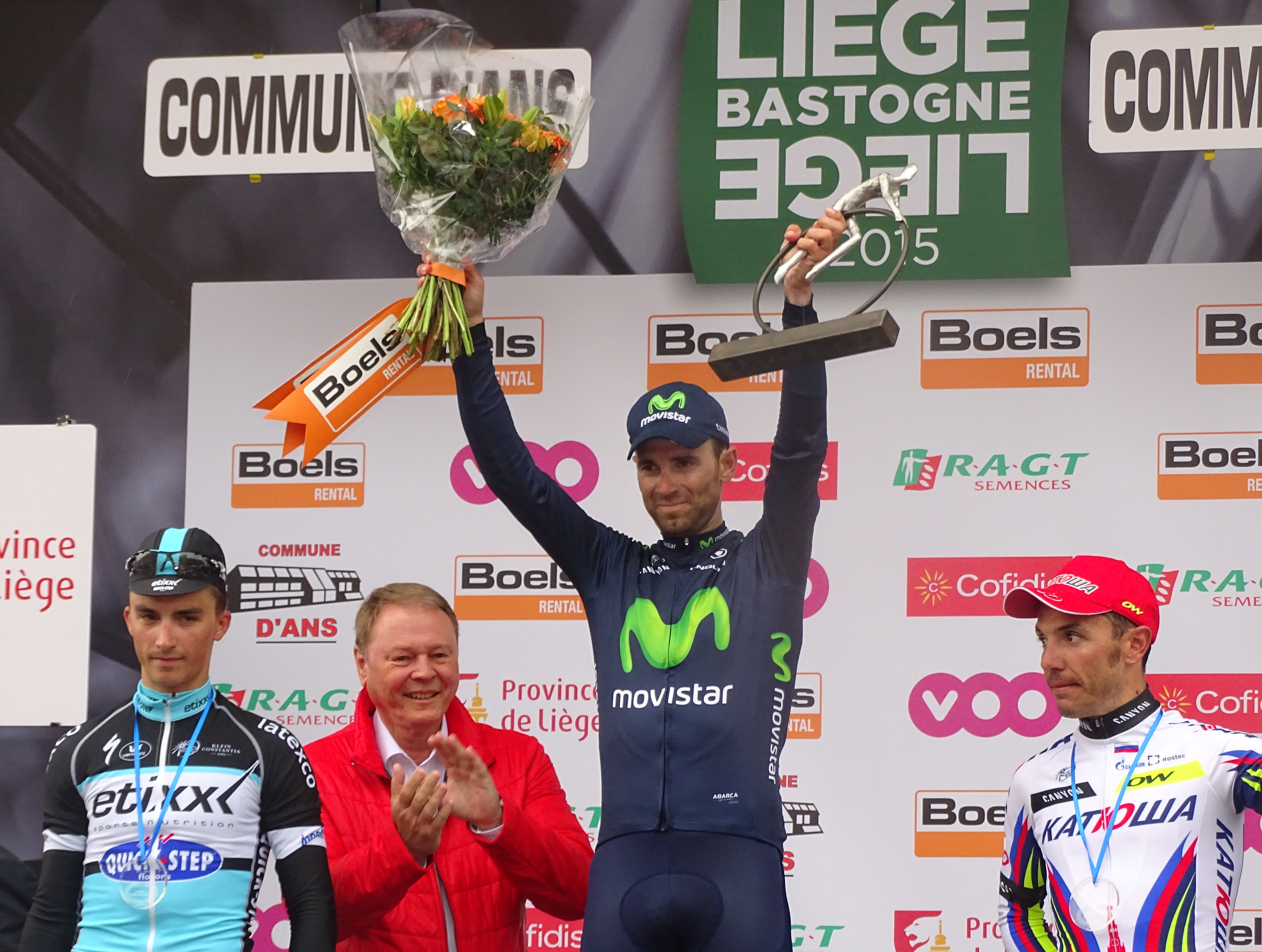
Valverde on the podium after winning the 2015 Liège–Bastogne–Liège

Valverde grabbed three stage victories in the Volta a Catalunya. On stage 2, he got the better of a bunch sprint and helped score a 1–2 for the Movistar Team with his teammate José Joaquín Rojas. On stage 5, he launched a late attack as he was part of a small group containing all the leaders coming into Valls and won solo. On the last stage, he won the sprint of a group of about 40 riders and with the bonus seconds, snatched the second place of the overall classification from Domenico Pozzovivo. At the Amstel Gold Race he came in second, being bested in a small group sprint by Michał Kwiatkowski. The following Wednesday, Valverde equalled the record number of victories on La Flèche Wallonne with 3, distancing Julian Alaphilippe and Michael Albasini in the final meters of the Mur de Huy.

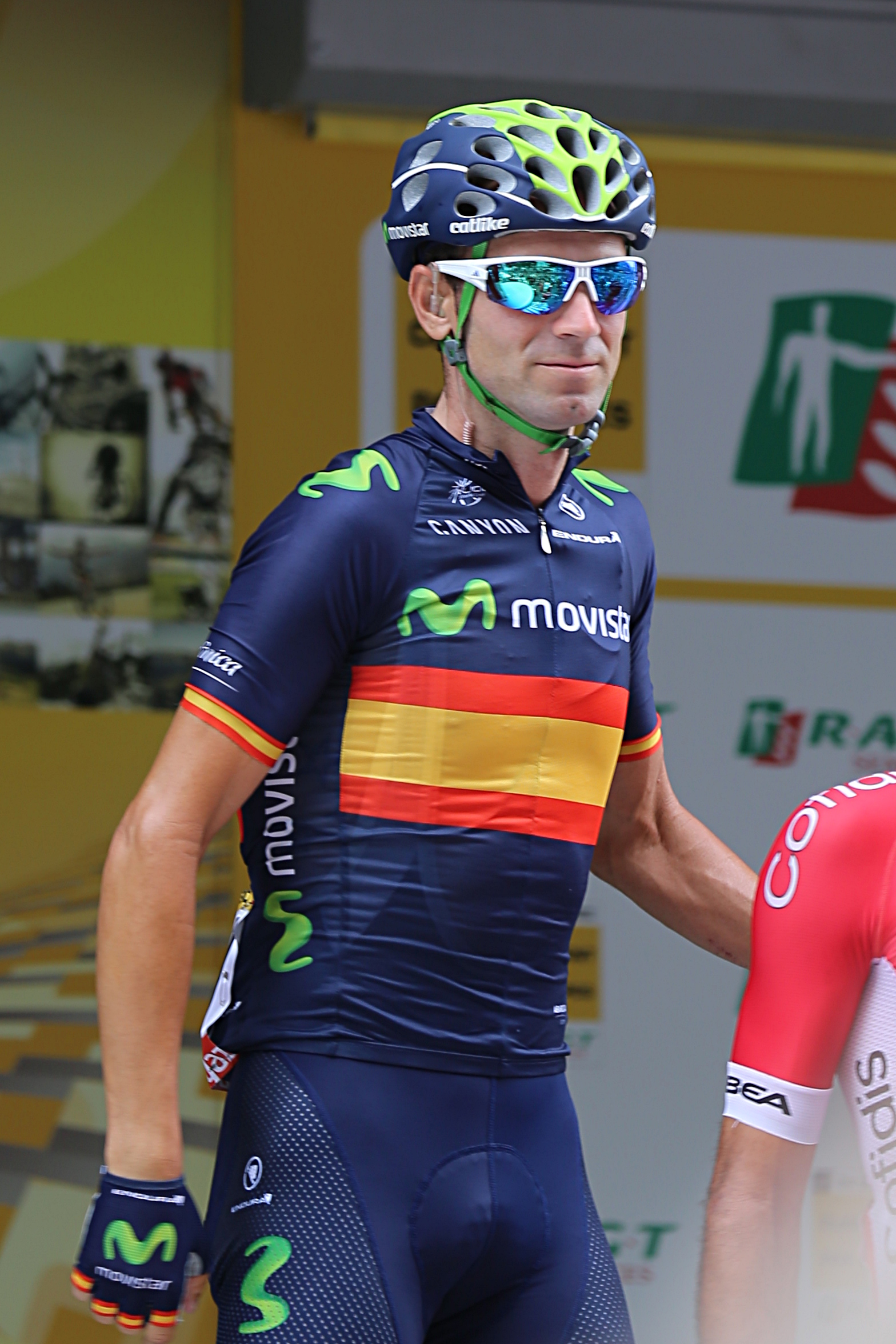
Valverde at the 2015 Tour de France.

He went one better the following Sunday, winning the sprint of a small group of riders to impose himself on Liège–Bastogne–Liège. It was the third time in his career Valverde had won La Doyenne. It was also the second time that he had won Liège–Bastogne–Liège and La Flèche Wallonne in the same year, becoming only the second rider to have achieved this double twice, after Ferdinand Kübler. In June, he won the Spanish National Road Race Championships. At the Tour de France, Valverde finished on the podium in 3rd place, his first podium finish at the Tour; achieving a lifelong dream of a top 3 finish. With that finish he had one career goal left, a World Championship victory.

==== 2016 ====
Valverde's main goals for the 2016 season were the Ardennes classics, the Giro d'Italia and the Road Race at the Olympic Games in Rio. He started his season by taking the overall at the Vuelta a Andalucía in February. He out-powered the rest of the contenders, including Tejay van Garderen and Rafał Majka, on the climb up to the finish on the final stage. Valverde changed his initial plan of riding the Tour of Flanders and went to Tenerife to prepare for the Giro. He returned to competition by winning two stages and the overall at the Vuelta a Castilla y León which he chose to race instead of the Amstel Gold Race, a race still lacking from his palmáres. The following Wednesday he took his third consecutive La Flèche Wallonne victory and became the most prolific winner of the "smaller" Ardennes Classic with his fourth win. He showed his climbing prowess by controlling up until the last 150 metres (490 feet) when he accelerated away from his rivals to take the victory. The Sunday following, he went out to repeat his Ardennes double from 2015 by securing another Liège–Bastogne–Liège win but he fell short and only managed to finish 16th.

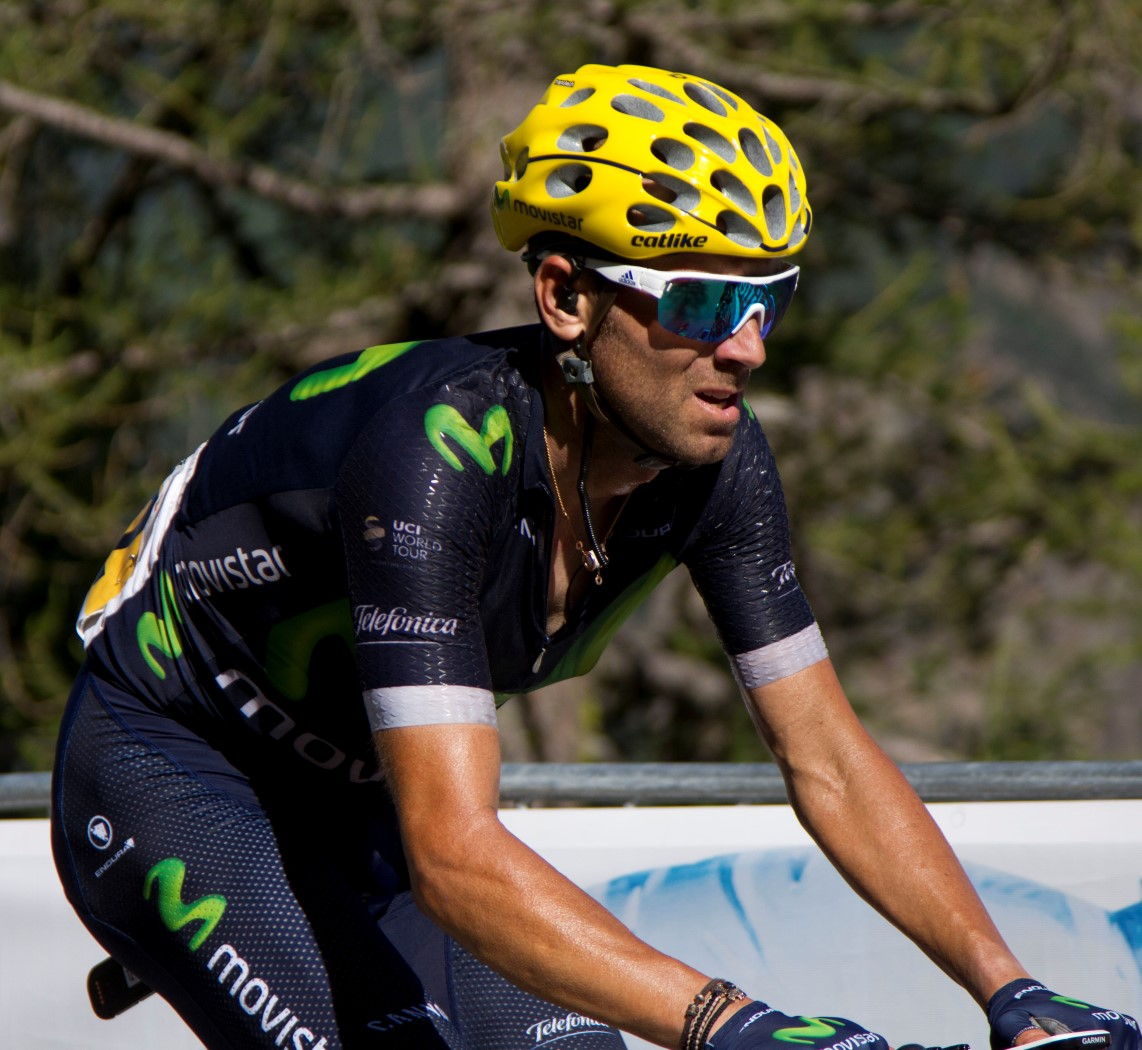
Valverde at the 2016 Tour de France

Valverde was named in the start list for the Giro d'Italia, his first participation in the Italian race. Valverde rode a consistent race but struggled in the high mountains especially on the queen stage in the Dolomites where he lost more than three minutes. He fought back the very next day with a third place in the mountain time trial and managed to win his first Giro d'Italia stage the day after the rest day in Andalo, his 14th stage win over the three Grand Tours. He secured his spot on the podium by outclimbing Steven Kruijswijk on the very last mountain stage and finished third overall, becoming only the 16th cyclist to finish on the podium in each of the three Grand Tours.

Later that year, Valverde finished sixth in the Tour de France, earning his ninth consecutive top 10 finish in his last nine grand tour starts. A week later he was third at the 2016 Clásica de San Sebastián. At the Vuelta a España he finished 12th in the general classification and third in the points classification. Upon completing the Vuelta he became just the 33rd rider in cycling history to complete all three grand tours in the same season. Valverde finished fourth in the World Tour season standings.

==== 2017 ====
In February 2017 Valverde took his first win of the season at the Vuelta a Murcia, a race that he had previously won four times. He followed this up with a win in the Vuelta a Andalucía for the fifth time in six years, defeating runner-up Alberto Contador by a single second and winning stage one in the process. The overall win was the 100th victory in Valverde's career. After not starting Paris–Nice due to illness, Valverde went on to dominate the Volta a Catalunya by winning stages three, five, and seven and beating runner-up Contador by over a minute. This was done in spite of him and his team being given a one-minute penalty for "pushes" in the opening team time trial. At the Tour of the Basque Country, Valverde won stage five and went into the final day's individual time trial as the race leader, albeit on the same time as Cannondale–Drapac's Rigoberto Urán and Michael Woods, AG2R La Mondiale's Romain Bardet, and UAE Team Emirates' Louis Meintjes, along with having just a three-second advantage over Contador. In the time trial, Valverde finished second on the day to Primož Roglič of LottoNL–Jumbo by just nine seconds, and he beat Contador by fourteen seconds, extending his overall lead, and giving Valverde his third stage race victory of the season.

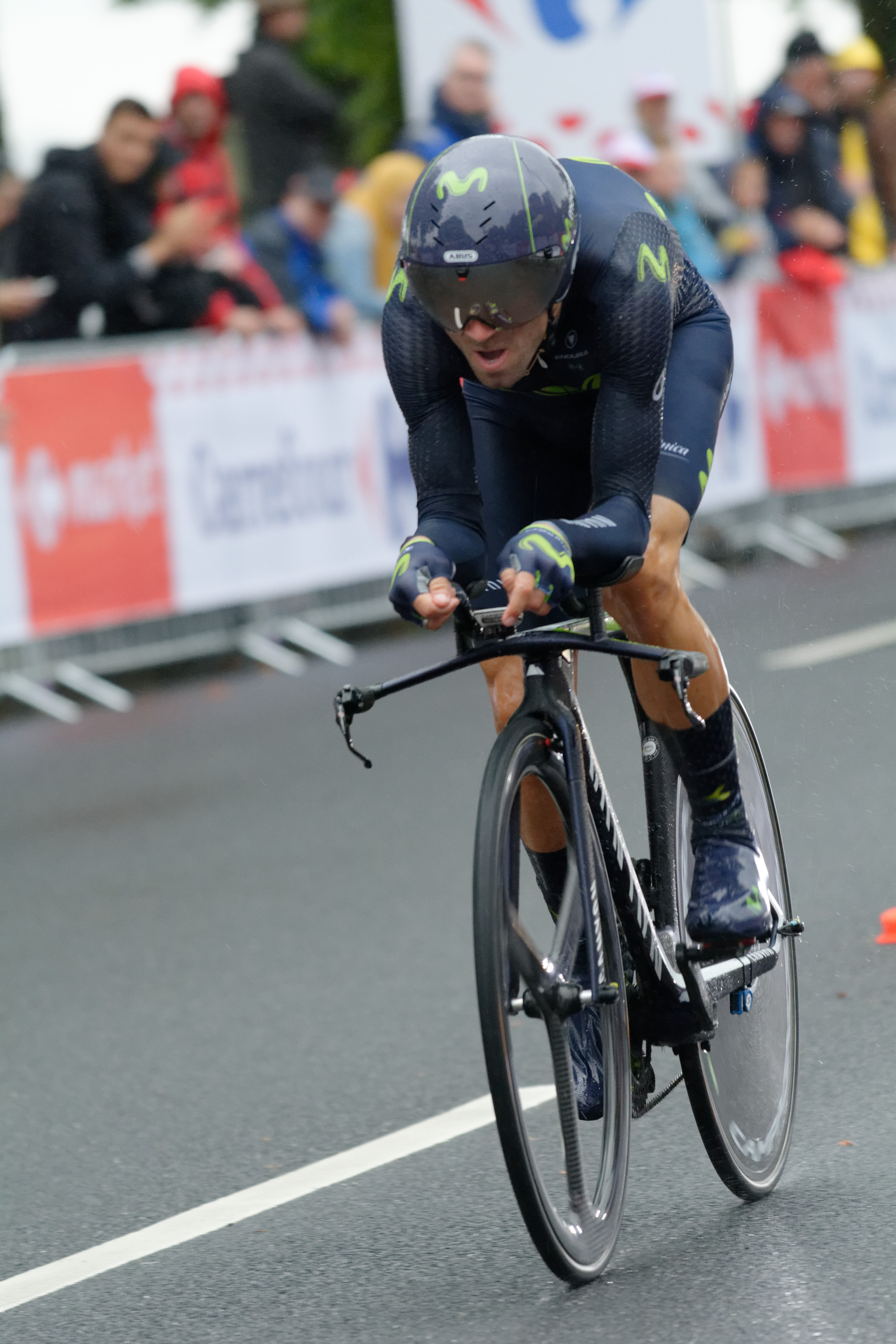
Valverde during Stage 1 of the 2017 Tour de France, shortly before a crash which ended his involvement in the race and cut short his season.

He punctuated his dominance in La Flèche Wallonne by winning the race for the fourth consecutive year and the fifth time overall. A few days later in Liège–Bastogne–Liège, Valverde fended off a late attack from Dan Martin and managed to outsprint him at the line and take his fourth win in the event. After taking time off from racing to train at a 25-day altitude camp at Sierra Nevada, Valverde raced in the Critérium du Dauphiné, where in the stage four time trial he clocked the third best time, losing out only to world time trial champion Tony Martin (Team Katusha–Alpecin) and BMC Racing Team's Richie Porte by twelve and twenty-four seconds respectively. He managed to put time into the rest of his general classification rivals, including Contador, Bardet, and most notably, defending champion Chris Froome (Team Sky). Over the subsequent mountain stages, Valverde was consistently aggressive; however, it failed to pay off and by the end of the Dauphiné he was 4 minutes 8 seconds down on Astana's Jakob Fuglsang, in ninth place overall. Going into the Tour de France, Valverde stated that he would work for his teammate Nairo Quintana; however, he was still considered an outside bet for the final podium by many pundits. On the opening individual time trial stage, Valverde crashed on a tight corner and was forced to abandon the Tour immediately; his first Grand Tour withdrawal since 2006. He suffered a fractured kneecap, ruling him out for several months. Ultimately, Valverde opted to end his 2017 season because of his knee injury with the hope of making his comeback at the start of the 2018 season.

==== 2018 ====
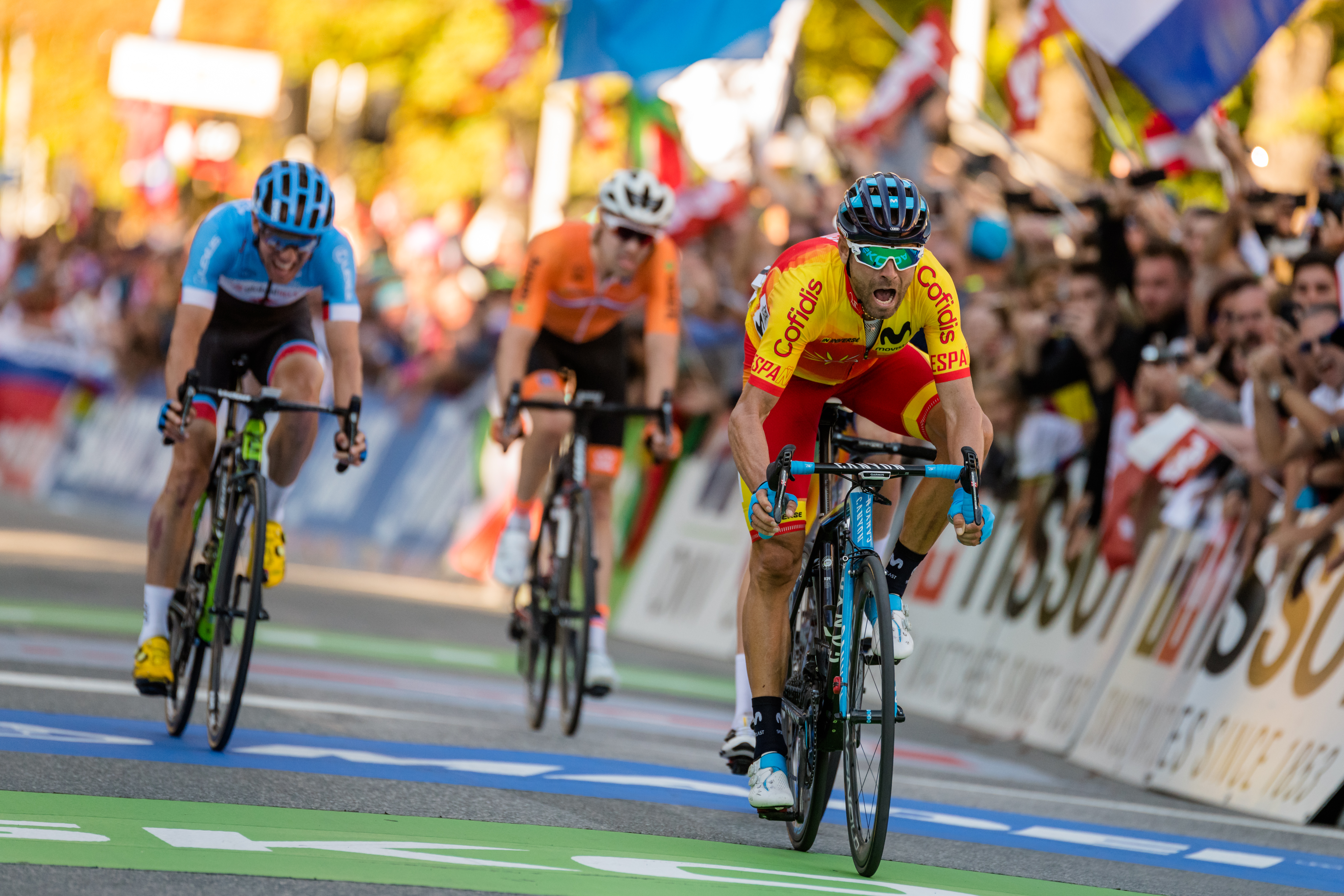
Valverde winning the 2018 UCI Road World Championships – Men's road race

Valverde returned to racing at the Challenge Mallorca in late January 2018. At the Volta a la Comunitat Valenciana, he took his first victory after his comeback, winning stage two and taking the overall lead in the process. The following weekend, he finished second to compatriot Luis León Sánchez in the Vuelta a Murcia. Later in February, Valverde claimed overall victory at the Abu Dhabi Tour, winning the stage to Jebel Hafeet. Valverde finished 17 seconds clear of Dutch rider Wilco Kelderman from Team Sunweb.

In March, Valverde rode the Strade Bianche classic, held partially on gravel roads in torrential rain. He finished fourth, 1 minute and 25 seconds behind winner Tiesj Benoot of Lotto–Soudal. Later that month, Valverde won the Volta a Catalunya for the third time in his career. Valverde won the second and fourth stages during the race, taking the race lead – and the mountains jersey as well – for good after his second stage victory. He finished 29 seconds clear of his nearest rival, teammate Nairo Quintana, after Quintana's Colombian compatriot Egan Bernal (Team Sky) crashed out of the race on the final day. His next race, the cobbled classic Dwars door Vlaanderen, resulted in an 11th place showing after being in the mix for the victory until the successful breakaway of eventual winner Yves Lampaert in the closing kilometers. After taking victory in the GP Miguel Induráin followed by a second place in the Klasika Primavera, he began his Ardennes campaign with 5th place at the Amstel Gold Race. On the following Wednesday he was beaten by Frenchman Julian Alaphilippe at La Flèche Wallonne, a race he had won the four previous years. Furthermore, he was unable to win Liège–Bastogne–Liège and finished 13th making it the first time since 2013 that he did not win an Ardennes Classic race.

After a lengthy break he won the Route d'Occitanie stage race in June where he prepared for the Tour de France. He made several long attacks in service of his teammates Quintana and Mikel Landa but all the three Movistar Team leaders failed to threaten the podium. Valverde returned for the Vuelta a España where was supposed to work for Quintana. He won stage 2 in an uphill sprint and stage 8 in a reduced bunch sprint, beating then World Champion Peter Sagan in the latter. He maintained a high position in the general classification until the last weekend and still had a chance of overall victory. He struggled in the last two stages in Andorra and only managed to finish 5th, but won the points classification for a record-equalling fourth time.

Valverde won the gold medal at the UCI Road World Championships in Innsbruck, in his twelfth participation. He triumphed in a small group sprint at the finish line ahead of Romain Bardet, Michael Woods and Tom Dumoulin, becoming the second oldest Road World Champion in history after Joop Zoetemelk. An emotional Valverde called this his biggest ever victory and one he has chased for 15 years.

==== 2019 ====
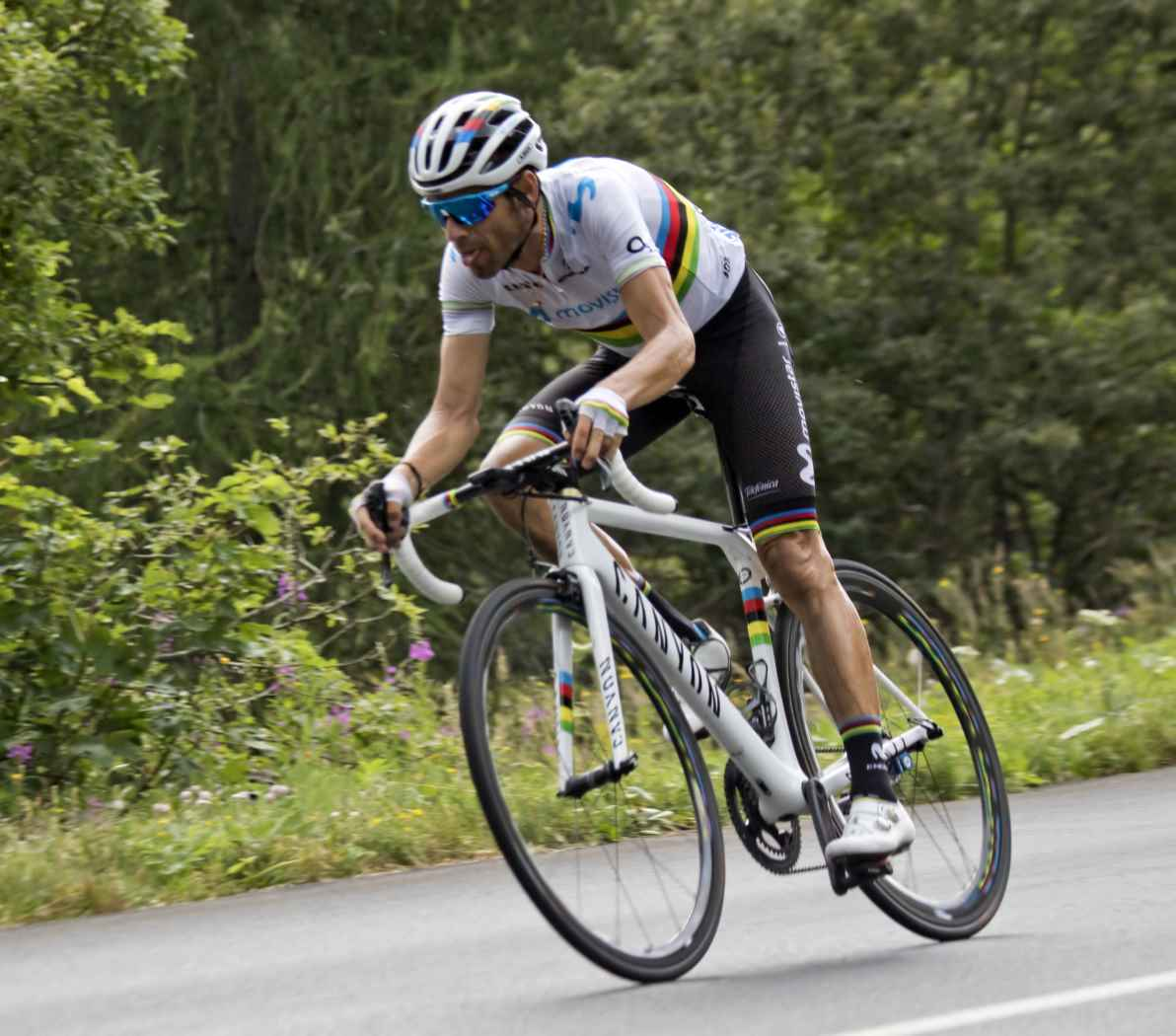
Valverde at the 2019 Tour de France

Valverde took his first major result of 2019 when he finished second overall to Ion Izagirre in the Volta a la Comunitat Valenciana. He then finished second again, this time to Luis León Sánchez, at the Vuelta a Murcia. At the 2019 UAE Tour, Valverde took his first victory as World Champion by winning the sprint at the summit finish of stage 3. He would go on to finish the race in second place overall.

During the spring classics, Valverde rode the Tour of Flanders, his first participation in the monument. He finished the race in eighth place. Valverde endured a difficult end to his spring campaign. At the Flèche Wallonne, he swallowed a bee during the race and eventually finished 11th. A crash in the leadup to Liège–Bastogne–Liège resulted in a bone edema. Valverde started the race, not knowing of the severity of his injury, and then abandoned during the event, the first time he had not finished. After recovering from his injuries, he returned to racing at the Route d'Occitanie, which he won. On 30 June, he won the Spanish National Road Race Championships for the third time in his career. At the Tour de France, he finished ninth overall.

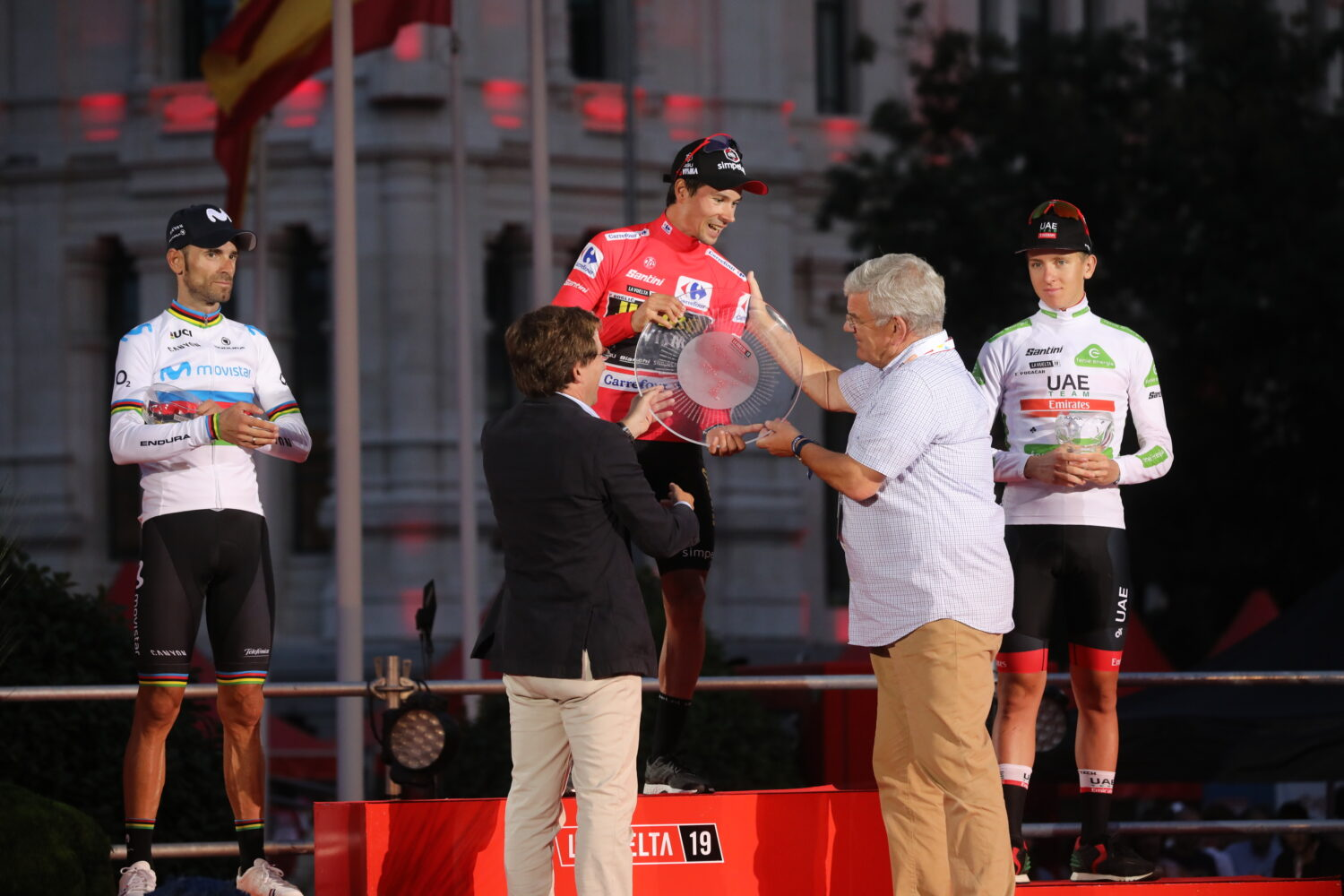
Valverde (left) on the podium at the 2019 Vuelta a Espana

At the Vuelta a España, Valverde took victory at stage 7 of the race, a summit finish at Mas de la Costa. He would eventually finish the Vuelta in second place overall, 2 minutes, 16 seconds behind Primož Roglič. At the World Championship road race in Yorkshire, run in very rainy conditions, Valverde abandoned his title defence with about 60 km (37 mi) to go. Towards the end of the season, he finished second to Bauke Mollema at Il Lombardia.

==== 2020 ====
Valverde contested six races prior to the COVID-19 pandemic-enforced suspension of racing, recording a best finish of second place to Emanuel Buchmann at the Trofeo Serra de Tramuntana, a one-day race held as part of the Vuelta a Mallorca. Following racing re-commencing, Valverde contested both the Tour de France and the Vuelta a España, finishing the races in twelfth and tenth positions respectively. He finished in the second chase group in the road race at the UCI Road World Championships in Italy, with an eighth-place finish.

==== 2021 ====
Having finished fourth in March's Volta a Catalunya, Valverde took his first victory in more than eighteen months with his record-equalling third victory in the GP Miguel Induráin, soloing clear with approximately 2 kilometres (1.2 miles) remaining. He recorded top-five finishes in each of the three Ardennes classics, making the podium with a third-place finish at La Flèche Wallonne. At June's Critérium du Dauphiné, Valverde won the sixth stage in a sprint of a small group in Le Sappey-en-Chartreuse, his first stage win at the race in thirteen years. He then competed in the Tour de France, finishing twenty-fourth, with his best stage result being a second-place finish to Sepp Kuss on stage fifteen, which finished in Andorra. He also participated in the men's individual road race in the COVID-19 pandemic-delayed Tokyo Olympics, his fifth participation at the Summer Olympic Games. He failed to finish the Vuelta a España after a crash on the seventh stage, the first time he had abandoned the race since his first start in 2002. His next start came at the Giro di Sicilia, where he won a stage and finished second overall to Vincenzo Nibali, losing the race lead following Nibali's final stage victory.

==== 2022 ====
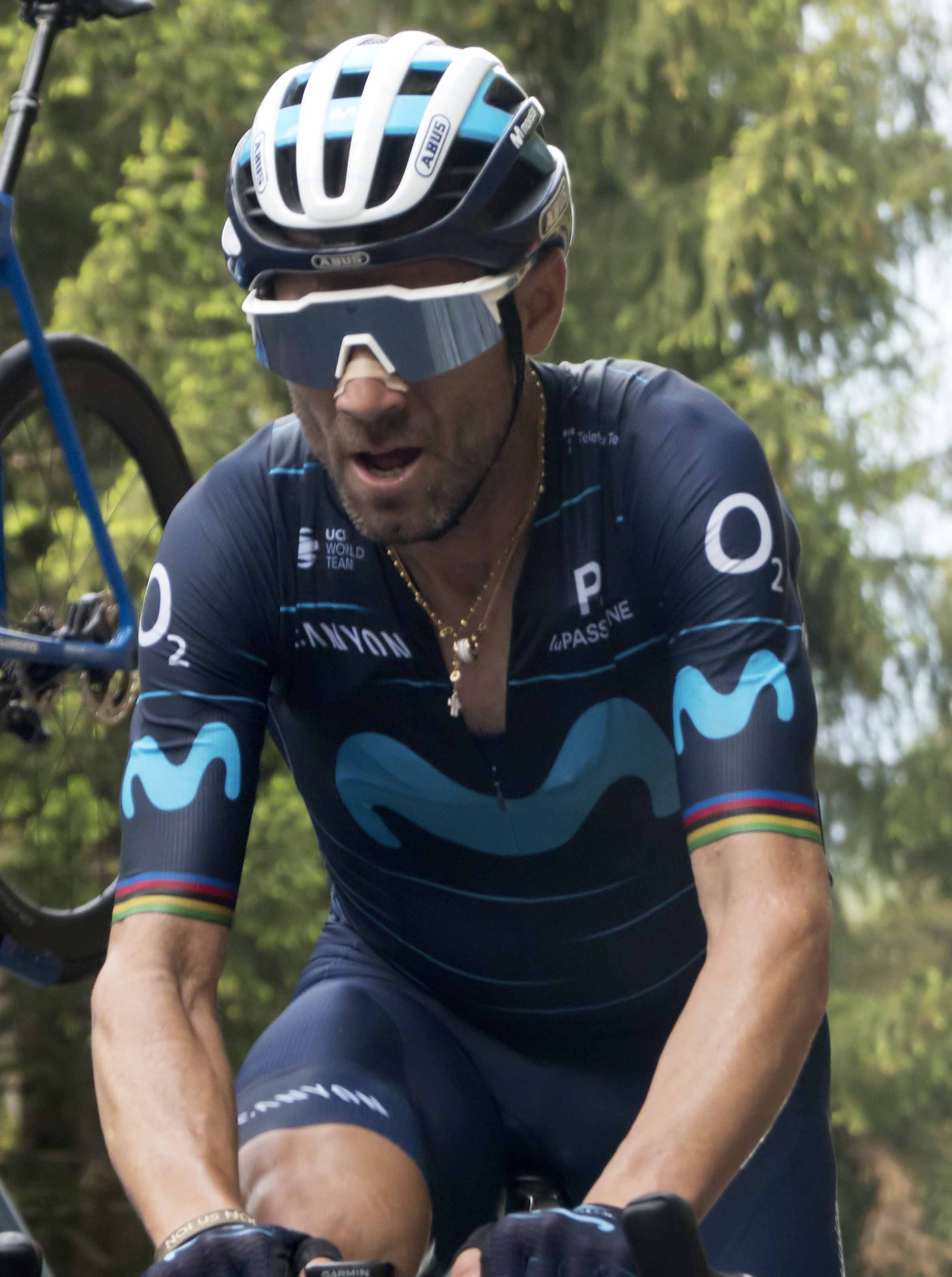
Valverde at the 2022 Giro d'Italia

In October 2021, Valverde announced that the 2022 season would be his final season as a professional rider. At the Vuelta a Mallorca, Valverde finished second to Tim Wellens in the Trofeo Serra de Tramuntana, before winning the Trofeo Pollença – Port d'Andratx in a sprint à deux against Brandon McNulty. The following month, he won a stage, the general classification and the points classification at the inaugural running of O Gran Camiño. He was the closest competitor to Tadej Pogačar in Strade Bianche, with Pogačar winning from a 50-kilometre (31-mile) solo attack. He finished second to Dylan Teuns at La Flèche Wallonne in April, before riding the Giro d'Italia for the first time since 2016, finishing eleventh overall. Having finished thirteenth at his sixteenth and final Vuelta a España, Valverde concluded his road racing career with an Italian block of racing – he recorded finishes of second in the Coppa Ugo Agostoni, fourth in the Giro dell'Emilia (assisting teammate Enric Mas to victory), third in Tre Valli Varesine, and sixth in Il Lombardia.

=== Gravel racing ===
In April 2023, it was announced that Valverde was coming out of retirement to compete in gravel cycling for the Movistar Team Gravel Squad. He won two events on the UCI Gravel World Series, winning La Indomable in Almería, and the Ranxo Gravel in Ponts, Lleida. Valverde finished on the 4th place at the 2023 World Gravel Championships.

=== Coaching ===
Since March 2025, Valverde has been the coach of the men's Spanish national team. He has taken a hand's on approach to training and has been riding with the athletes during training runs.

== Doping ==
Alejandro Valverde has been linked by documentary and DNA evidence to the Operación Puerto, a blood doping affair which erupted in May 2006 against doctor Eufemiano Fuentes and a number of accomplices. It uncovered doping products, bags of blood and human plasma, and code names that appeared to link top athletes, including up to 60 cyclists, to a highly organized system of doping, which relied heavily on blood transfusions.

Valverde was not initially linked in the investigation, but documents from Madrid's Court 31 linked Valverde to a single bag of human plasma of the 211 total bags of blood and plasma seized in the investigation. The bag of human plasma was labelled with the codes Valv, Piti and 18. In 2007 Valverde was banned by the International Cycling Union (UCI) from competing in the UCI Road World Championships in Stuttgart but Valverde was cleared by the Court of Arbitration for Sport to compete at the championships. Dick Pound, World Anti-Doping Agency president, said the CAS decision did not mean that Valverde was no longer a suspect.

In early 2009 the Italian National Olympic Committee matched DNA samples taken from Valverde during a rest day in Italy of the 2008 Tour de France to plasma seized in the Operación Puerto investigation. At a February 2009 appearance in front of the Olympic Committee, Valverde maintained his innocence and questioned the Italians' jurisdiction over this case. In May 2009, the Italian Olympic Committee suspended him from competition in Italy for 2 years, effectively barring him from the 2009 Tour de France, which detoured briefly onto Italian soil. Valverde filed an unsuccessful appeal against the Italian ban with the Court of Arbitration for Sport; in a second hearing on 18–21 March 2010, the UCI and WADA contested the Spanish Cycling Federation's decision not to open a case against Valverde.

Finally, on 31 May 2010 it was announced the Court of Arbitration for Sport upheld the appeals from WADA and the UCI and Valverde was banned for two years, starting 1 January 2010, but rejected the request that any results obtained by the athlete prior to the beginning of the suspension be annulled. After serving the two-year suspension Alejandro Valverde returned to competition in 2012 riding for the Movistar Team.

After a lengthy court battle, he was suspended for two years as part of the Operación Puerto blood doping investigation, but he returned to competition in 2012 upon completion of the ban. All his results from 2010 were stripped, including the overall win in the 2010 Tour de Romandie, and he did not compete in 2011.

== Career achievements ==
=== Awards ===
- Vélo d'Or: 2018

== Notes ==
Sporting positions
Preceded by Joaquim Rodríguez	Spanish Road Race Champion; 2008	Succeeded by Rubén Plaza
Preceded by Ion Izagirre	Spanish Road Race Champion; 2015	Succeeded by José Joaquín Rojas
Preceded by Danilo Di Luca	La Flèche Wallonne; 2006	Succeeded by Davide Rebellin
Preceded by Daniel Moreno	La Flèche Wallonne; 2014, 2015, 2016, 2017	Succeeded by Julian Alaphilippe
Preceded by Alexander Vinokourov	Liège–Bastogne–Liège; 2006	Succeeded by Danilo Di Luca
Preceded by Danilo Di Luca	Liège–Bastogne–Liège; 2008	Succeeded by Andy Schleck
Preceded by Simon Gerrans	Liège–Bastogne–Liège; 2015	Succeeded by Wout Poels
Preceded by Wout Poels	Liège–Bastogne–Liège; 2017	Succeeded by Bob Jungels
