= Acqua & Sapone =

Cycling team (2004–2012)

Team information
- UCI code: ASA
- Registered: Italy
- Founded: 2004
- Disbanded: 2012
- Discipline: Road
- Status: Division II (2004); UCI Professional Continental (2005–2012)
- Bicycles: Focus
- Website: Team home page

Key personnel
- General manager: Palmiro Masciarelli
- Team manager: Bruno Cenghialta

Team name history
- 2004 2005 2006 2007–2009 2010–2012: Acqua & Sapone-Caffè Mokambo; Acqua & Sapone-Adria Mobil; Acqua & Sapone; Acqua & Sapone-Caffè Mokambo; Acqua & Sapone
Acqua & Sapone jersey
Jersey

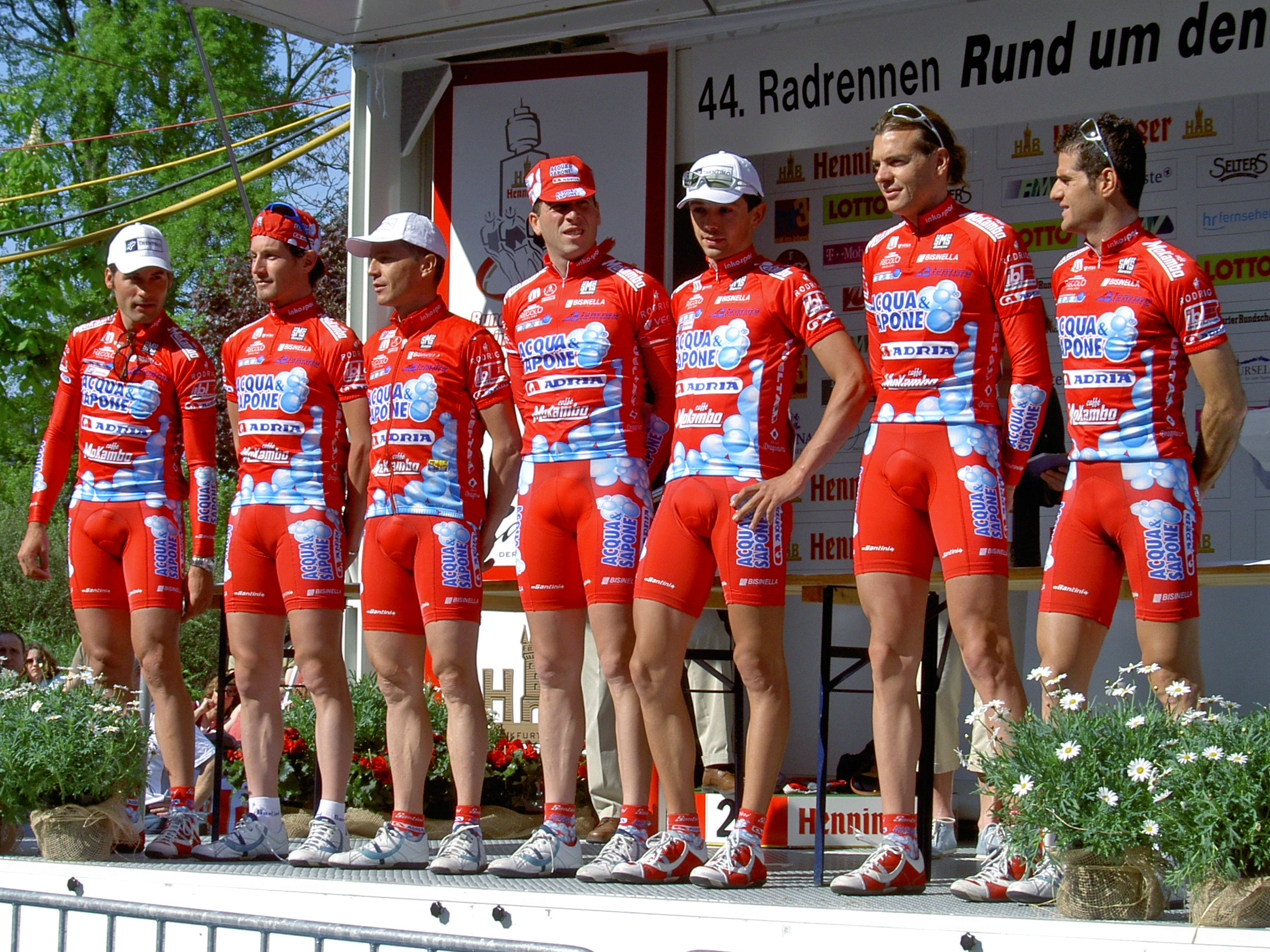
Acqua & Sapone-Adria Mobil in 2005.

Acqua & Sapone (UCI team code: ASA) was a professional continental cycling team based in Italy and participated in UCI Europe Tour and when selected as a wildcard to UCI ProTour events. They were managed by Palmiro Masciarelli, assisted by directeur sportifs Lorenzo Di Lorenzo, Bruno Cenghialta and Franco Gini. The team won team championship (or team points ranking) on the 2005–06 UCI Europe Tour.

The team folded at the end of the 2012 season, after losing their main backing.

== 2012 roster ==
As of 13 January 2012.

Rider	Date of birth
Carlos Betancur (COL)	13 October 1989 (aged 22)
Paolo Ciavatta (ITA)	6 November 1984 (aged 27)
Massimo Codol (ITA)	27 February 1973 (aged 38)
Claudio Corioni (ITA)	26 December 1982 (aged 29)
Danilo Di Luca (ITA)	2 January 1976 (aged 36)
Francesco Di Paolo (ITA)	18 April 1982 (aged 29)
Alessandro Donati (ITA)	8 May 1979 (aged 32)
Stefano Garzelli (ITA)	16 July 1973 (aged 38)
Francesco Ginanni (ITA)	6 October 1985 (aged 26)

Rider	Date of birth
Ruggero Marzoli (ITA)	2 April 1976 (aged 35)
Andrea Masciarelli (ITA)	2 September 1982 (aged 29)
Simone Masciarelli (ITA)	2 January 1980 (aged 32)
Vladimir Miholjević (CRO)	18 January 1974 (aged 37)
Danilo Napolitano (ITA)	31 January 1981 (aged 30)
Francesco Reda (ITA)	19 November 1982 (aged 29)
Daniele Scampamorte (ITA)	15 July 1986 (aged 25)
Fabio Taborre (ITA)	5 June 1985 (aged 26)

== Major wins ==
2004
Stage 3 Settimana Internazionale di Coppi e Bartali, Crescenzo D'Amore
Stage 5 Settimana Internazionale di Coppi e Bartali, Ruggero Marzoli
Stage 2 Giro d'Abruzzo, Ruggero Marzoli
Stage 2 & 6 Circuit des Mines, Denis Bertolini
Stage 2 Course de la Paix, Denis Bertolini
Stage 9 Giro d'Italia, Fred Rodriguez
Wachovia Classic, Fred Rodriguez
Czech Republic Road Race Championship, Ondřej Sosenka
Overall Tour de Pologne, Ondřej Sosenka

Stage 5, Rinaldo Nocentini
Stage 8, Ondřej Sosenka

2005
Prologue UNIQA Classic, Ondřej Sosenka
Stage 3b Tour of Belgium, Ondřej Sosenka
Stage 1 Tour of Slovenia, Ruggero Marzoli
Subida al Naranco, Rinaldo Nocentini
Czech Republic Time Trial Championship, Ondřej Sosenka
Trofeo Matteotti, Ruggero Marzoli
Chrono des Herbiers, Ondřej Sosenka

2006
Stage 2 Settimana Lombarda, Gabriele Balducci
Giro dell'Appennino, Rinaldo Nocentini
Stage 5 Course de la Paix, Kanstantsin Sivtsov
Overall Circuit de Lorraine, Juan Mauricio Soler

Stage 2, Juan Mauricio Soler

Stage 2 Euskal Bizikleta, Andrea Tonti
Belarus Road Race Championship, Kanstantsin Sivtsov
Czech Republic Time Trial Championship, Ondřej Sosenka
GP Fred Mengoni, Andrea Tonti
Giro del Veneto, Rinaldo Nocentini
Coppa Placci, Rinaldo Nocentini

2007
Stage 5 Tour Méditerranéen, Gabriele Balducci
Stage 2 Tirreno–Adriatico, Alexandr Arekeev
Overall Settimana Internazionale di Coppi e Bartali, Michele Scarponi

Stage 2, Michele Scarponi

Stage 3 Giro del Trentino, Stefano Garzelli
Overall Tour of Japan, Francesco Masciarelli

Stage 3 & 5, Francesco Masciarelli

Stage 14 & 16 Giro d'Italia, Stefano Garzelli
Stage 2 Tour of Slovenia, Stefano Garzelli
Belarus Road Race Championship, Branislau Samoilau
Belarus Time Trial Championship, Andrei Kunitski
Stage 3 Tour de Wallonie, Giuseppe Palumbo
Stage 3 Vuelta a Burgos, Aurélien Passeron
Gran Premio Industria e Commercio Artigianato Carnaghese, Aurélien Passeron

2008
Stage 1 Giro della Provincia di Reggio Calabria, Gabriele Balducci
Trofeo Laigueglia, Luca Paolini
Stage 3 Settimana Lombarda, Gabriele Balducci
Stage 5 Settimana Lombarda, Branislau Samoilau
Stage 6 Settimana Lombarda, Francesco Failli
Stage 2 & 4 Giro del Trentino, Stefano Garzelli
Stage 2 Vuelta a La Rioja, Diego Milán
Stage 2a & 3 Vuelta a Asturias, Stefano Garzelli
Stage 2 GP Paredes Rota dos Moveis, Diego Milán
Belarus Time Trial Championship, Andrei Kunitski
Stage 1 Vuelta a Burgos, Andrei Kunitski
Coppa Placci, Luca Paolini
Grand Prix de Wallonie, Stefano Garzelli
Giro del Lazio, Francesco Masciarelli

2009
Stage 6 Settimana Lombarda, Luca Paolini
Stages 4 & 17 Giro d'Italia, Stefano Garzelli
Mountain classification Giro d'Italia, Stefano Garzelli
Coppa Bernocchi, Luca Paolini

2010
Stage 5 Tour Méditerranéen, Francesco Masciarelli
Overall Tirreno–Adriatico, Stefano Garzelli
Stage 16 Giro d'Italia, Stefano Garzelli
(Tunisia) Road Race Championships, Rafaâ Chtioui

2011
Stage 2 Settimana Internazionale di Coppi e Bartali, Claudio Corioni
Mountain classification Giro d'Italia, Stefano Garzelli
Gran Premio Città di Camaiore, Fabio Taborre
Memorial Marco Pantani, Fabio Taborre
Giro dell'Emilia, Carlos Betancur

2012
Croatia Road Race Championships, Vladimir Miholjević
Croatia Time Trial Championships, Vladimir Miholjević
Stage 4 Circuit de Lorraine, Danilo Napolitano
Stage 5 Tour of Belgium, Carlos Betancur
Trofeo Melinda, Carlos Betancur
Stage 2 Tour of Austria, Danilo Di Luca
Stage 5 Tour of Austria, Fabio Taborre
Gran Premio Nobili Rubinetterie, Danilo Di Luca
Stages 2, 4 & 5 Tour de Wallonie, Danilo Napolitano
Stage 5 Giro di Padania, Carlos Betancur

== National champions ==
2004
Road Race Championship, Ondřej Sosenka
2005
Time Trial Championship, Ondřej Sosenka
2006
Belarus Road Race Championship, Kanstantsin Sivtsov
Time Trial Championship, Ondřej Sosenka
2007
Belarus Road Race Championship, Branislau Samoilau
Belarus Time Trial Championship, Andrei Kunitski
2008
Belarus Time Trial Championship, Andrei Kunitski
2010
Tunisia Road Race Championships, Rafaâ Chtioui
2012
Croatia Road Race Championships, Vladimir Miholjević
Croatia Time Trial Championships, Vladimir Miholjević
