= Cycling Ranking =

Website providing statistics about cycling

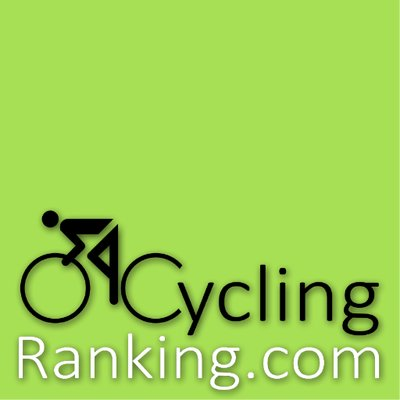
- Website type: Online All-Time Pro-Cycling Ranking Website
- Available in: English
- Owner: Private-owned
- Creator: Peter van Uijtregt
- Website: cyclingranking.com
- Commercial: No
- Registration: No registration needed.
- Launched: June 6, 1971; 55 years ago
- Current status: Active

Cycling Ranking is an online database that offers insight into the yearly and overall career performances of professional road racing cyclists. The database contains race data going back to year 1869. Its aim is to provide historical context to rider's performance over time by means of an all-time ranking for male road-racing cyclists based on their results in professional road races. The site and his ranking have been used by writers of cycling literature in order to make a selection of historical riders to be represented in their books.

== Rider Rankings ==
The main part of the database provides access to the individual rider rankings. It offers range of different views into the history of professional cyclists and a personal page for each of the riders. Different individual ranking are:

- Yearly Rankings.
- Top 10-Year Average Ranking, that attempts to correct the ranking for riders that have exceptionally long careers.
- Contemporary Rankings, where cyclists are being compared to their contemporaries.

The main ranking is the Overall Individual Ranking, that currently has the following top 10:

Rank	Name	From	To
1	Eddy Merckx (BEL)	1965	1978
2	Alejandro Valverde (ESP)	2002	2022
3	Sean Kelly (IRL)	1977	1994
4	Gino Bartali (ITA)	1934	1954
5	Francesco Moser (ITA)	1973	1988
6	Joop Zoetemelk (NED)	1970	1987
7	Raymond Poulidor (FRA)	1960	1977
8	Tadej Pogačar (SLO)	2017	2026
9	Roger De Vlaeminck (BEL)	1969	1988
10	Felice Gimondi (ITA)	1965	1979

== Country Rankings ==
The Country Rankings give a historical overview of the performances of countries respective to each other and rankings of individual riders for each country, both yearly and overall since 1869. Currently the overall Top 10 Country Ranking is as follows

Rank	Country
1	Italy
2	Belgium
3	France
4	Spain
5	Netherlands
6	Switzerland
7	Germany
8	United Kingdom
9	Australia
10	United States

== Team Rankings ==
Besides individual and country rankings the database attempts to offer a historical overview of the commercial trade teams, its directors and its managers, again, both yearly and overall. At the moment the most successful trade team is the Peugeot Cycling Team, the top team manager, Patrick Lefevere and the top directeur sportif, Lomme Driessens.
