= Fabio Taborre =

Italian cyclist (1985–2021)

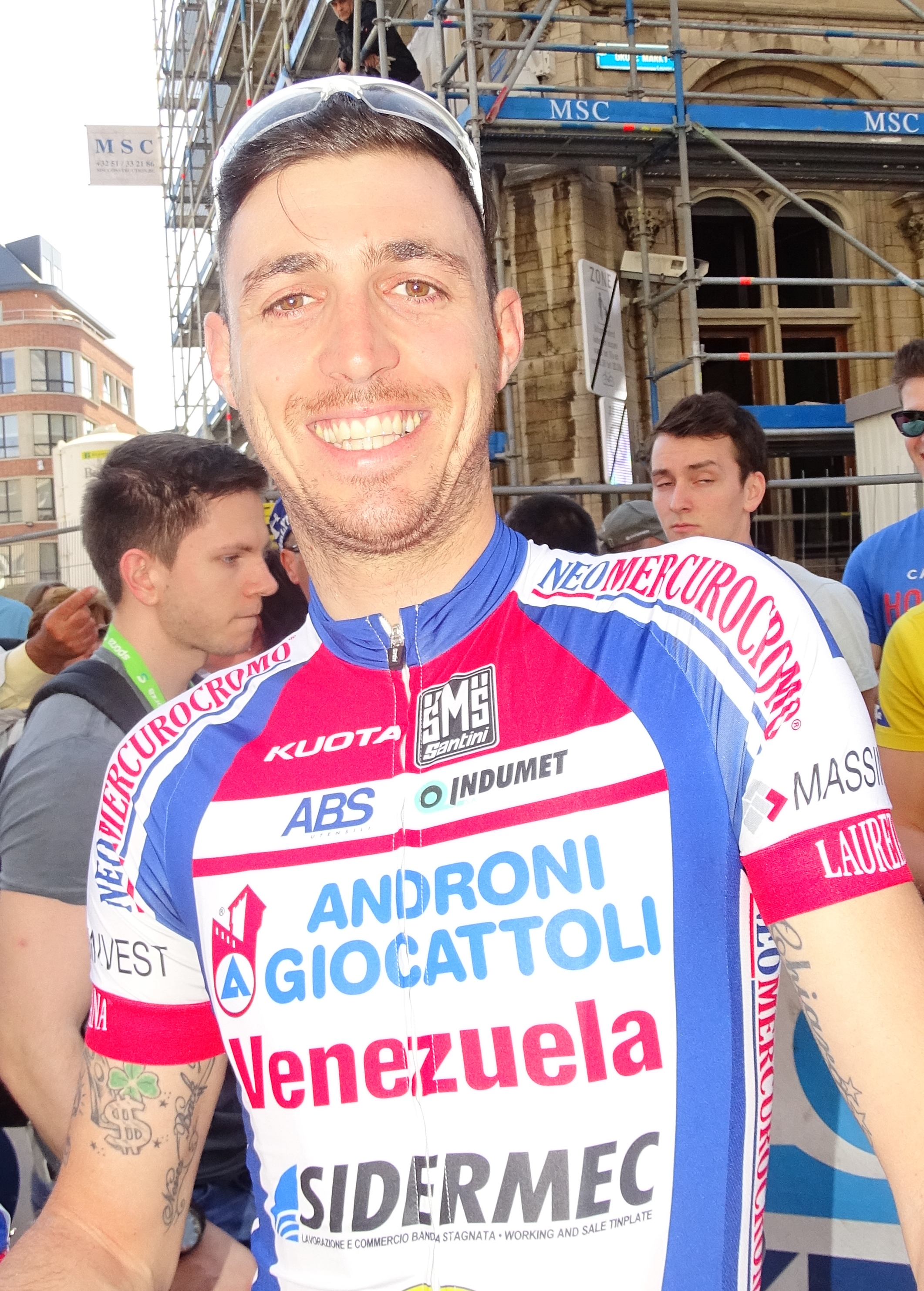
- Taborre at the 2015 Brabantse Pijl

Personal information
- Born: 5 June 1985 Pescara, Italy
- Died: 12 September 2021 (aged 36) Cappelle sul Tavo, Italy
- Height: 1.78 m (5 ft 10 in)
- Weight: 66 kg (146 lb)

Cycling career
- Sport: Cycling
- Discipline: Road
- Role: Rider

Amateur team
- 2006–2008: Aran World–Cantina Tollo–BLS

Professional teams
- 2008: →Diquigiovanni–Androni (stagiaire)
- 2009–2010: Diquigiovanni–Androni
- 2011–2012: Acqua & Sapone
- 2013–2014: Vini Fantini–Selle Italia
- 2015: Androni Giocattoli

Fabio Taborre (5 June 1985 – 12 September 2021) was an Italian professional road cyclist, suspended from the sport due to an anti-doping violation.

== Doping ==
On 27 July 2015, UCI announced that Taborre had tested positive for the HIF prolyl-hydroxylase inhibitor FG-4592 in an out-of-competition control 16 June 2015, and that he was provisionally suspended. It was announced on 25 May 2016 that Taborre would be suspended for four years for the latter infraction, backdated to 26 July 2015.

== Major results ==
2008
1st Trofeo Salvatore Morucci
2009
2nd Giro della Provincia di Reggio Calabria
9th Memorial Marco Pantani
2010
9th Gran Premio Nobili Rubinetterie – Coppa Città di Stresa
2011
1st Gran Premio Città di Camaiore
1st Memorial Marco Pantani
4th Trofeo Laigueglia
4th Trofeo Matteotti
6th Gran Premio Bruno Beghelli
7th Giro della Romagna
9th Gran Premio Industria e Commercio di Prato
10th Trofeo Melinda
2012
1st Stage 5 Tour of Austria
2nd GP Industria & Artigianato di Larciano
3rd Trofeo Matteotti
4th Gran Premio Nobili Rubinetterie
6th Coppa Ugo Agostoni
6th Milano–Torino
8th Memorial Marco Pantani
2013
7th Trofeo Matteotti
10th Overall Settimana Internazionale di Coppi e Bartali
2014
9th Giro dell'Appennino

== See also ==
- List of doping cases in cycling
