= Aurélien Passeron =

French road bicycle racer

Personal information
- Full name: Aurélien Passeron
- Born: 19 January 1984 (age 42) Nice, France

Cycling career
- Sport: Cycling
- Current team: Retired
- Discipline: Road
- Role: Rider

Amateur teams
- 2003–2005: AVC Aix-en-Provence
- 2006: Pedale Larigiano-Cargo Embassy-Albatros
- 2009: Nordland-Hamburg
- 2010: Garneau Club Chaussure
- 2013: Predator Carbon Repair
- 2015: SC Nice Jollywear

Professional teams
- 2007: Acqua & Sapone–Caffè Mokambo
- 2008: Saunier Duval–Scott
- 2009: Tuşnad Cycling Team
- 2010: Meridiana–Kamen
- 2011: Geumsan Ginseng Asia
- 2012: Wonderful Pistachios
- 2014: Silber Pro Cycling Team

Aurélien Passeron (born 19 January 1984) is a French former road racing cyclist, who competed for professional teams Acqua & Sapone–Caffè Mokambo, Scott–American Beef, Tuşnad Cycling Team, Meridiana–Kamen, Geumsan Ginseng Asia and the Silber Pro Cycling Team.

== Major results ==
2002
1st Giro di Vertova
2003
1st Overall Tour des Aéroports
2005
1st Road race, National Under-23 Road Championships
2006
1st Firenze–Empoli
1st Trofeo Franco Balestra
3rd Overall Coppa delle Nazioni

1st Stage 2

6th Giro del Casentino
2007
1st Gran Premio Industria e Commercio Artigianato Carnaghese
1st Stage 3 Vuelta a Burgos
2009
3rd Overall Tour of Szeklerland

1st Stage 4

2011
4th Overall Paris–Corrèze
6th Overall Tour de Korea
6th Overall Kreiz Breizh Elites
6th Ronde Pévéloise
2013
4th Philly Cycling Classic
2014
4th White Spot / Delta Road Race
7th Overall Grand Prix Cycliste de Saguenay
