= Gabriele Balducci =

Italian racing cyclist

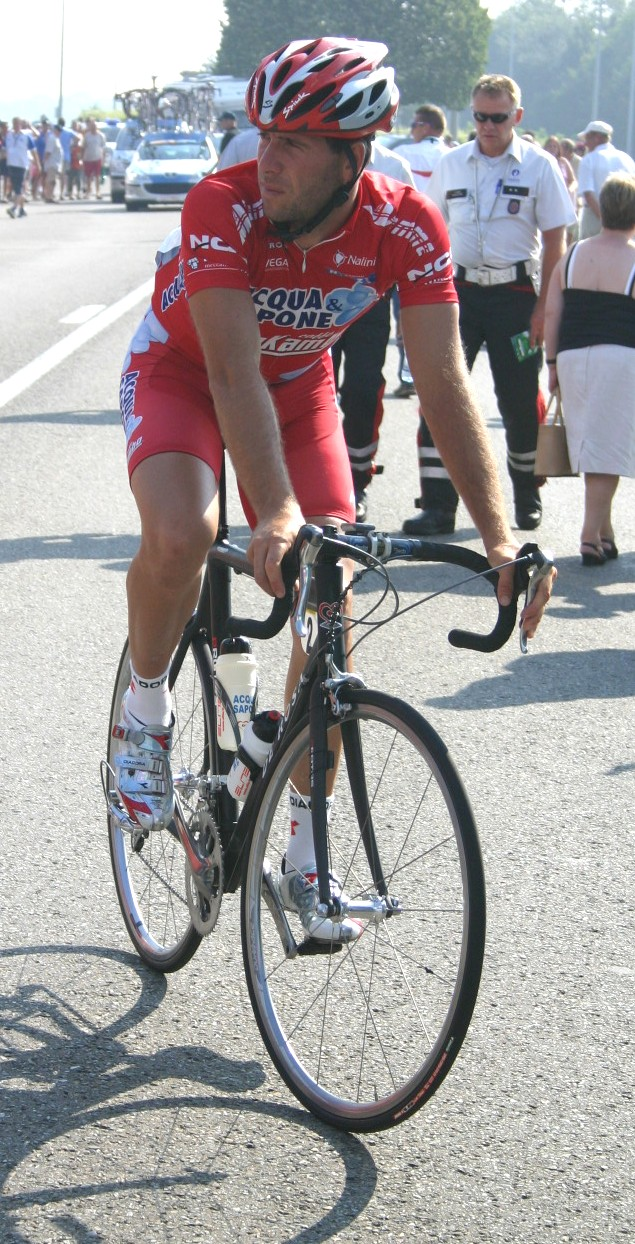

Personal information
- Full name: Gabriele Balducci
- Born: 3 November 1975 (age 50) Pontedera, Italy

Cycling career
- Sport: Cycling
- Discipline: Road
- Role: Rider
- Rider type: Sprinter

Professional teams
- 1997: Ceramiche Refin
- 1998: Scrigno
- 1999: Navigare
- 2000: Fassa Bortolo
- 2001–2002: Tacconi Sport
- 2003: Vini Caldirola
- 2004: Saeco
- 2005–2008: Acqua & Sapone

Major wins
- Tirreno–Adriatico, 1 stage (1998)

Gabriele Balducci (born 3 November 1975 in Pontedera, Province of Pisa) is an Italian racing cyclist who rode for Acqua & Sapone.

== Professional career ==
His major victory is the 1st stage in the 1998 Tirreno–Adriatico in Sorrento.

== Palmares ==
- Giro della Provincia di Reggio Calabria – 1 stage (2008)
- Giro d'Italia – 1 stage (2007) after Alessandro Petacchi's disqualification
- Tour Méditerranéen – 1 stage (2001–2007)
- Milan–San Remo
  - 7th (2001–2007)
  - 10th (1999)
- Settimana Ciclista Lombarda – 1 stage (2006)
- Giro della Liguria – 1 stage (2003)
- HEW Cyclassics – 6th (2000)
- Giro del Lago Maggiore (1999)
- Tour of Slovenia – 1 stage (1999)
- Tirreno–Adriatico – 1 stage (1998)
- Alassio Cup (1997)
- Italian Road U17 Championship – 2nd (1991)
