= List of teams and cyclists in the 2010 Giro d'Italia =

The 2010 Giro d'Italia began on May 8 in Amsterdam in the Netherlands, and ended on May 30 in Verona. Twenty-two professional cycling teams entered the race, who each entered a squad of nine riders. This group includes 15 UCI ProTour teams and seven UCI Professional Continental teams. Sixteen teams were guaranteed entry by a September 2008 contract between the UCI and the organizers of the season's three Grand Tours. Two from this group – Euskaltel–Euskadi and Française des Jeux – declined to participate in the race, freeing up spots for two more teams. Two new teams joined the ProTour in 2010, but only one, Team Sky, participated in the Giro, as Team RadioShack opted instead to send their best riders to the 2010 Tour of California, which was partly concurrent to the Giro.

Of the seven Professional Continental teams in the race, two, Bbox Bouygues Telecom and Cofidis, were covered by the September 2008 contract, as they were members of the ProTour at that time. The other five Professional Continental teams had to be selected by race organizers. There was minor controversy in that although the Giro begins in the Netherlands, the only Dutch-registered team in the race was Rabobank, which was guaranteed entry. Skil–Shimano and Vacansoleil both sought places in the race, but did not receive them.

== By team ==
Legend
No.	Starting number worn by the rider during the Giro
Pos.	Position in the general classification
†	Denotes riders born on or after 1 January 1985 eligible for the Young rider classification
DNS	Denotes a rider who did not start, followed by the stage before which he withdrew
DNF	Denotes a rider who did not finish, followed by the stage in which he withdrew
Age correct as of 8 May 2010, the date on which the Giro began

BMC Racing Team
No.	Rider	Pos.
1	Cadel Evans (AUS)	5
2	Brent Bookwalter (USA)	95
3 †	Martin Kohler (SUI)	DNF-2
4	Jeff Louder (USA)	DNF-11
5	Mauro Santambrogio (ITA)	DNF-11
6	John Murphy (USA)	DNF-8
7 †	Michael Schär (SUI)	99
8	Florian Stalder (SUI)	81
9 †	Danilo Wyss (SUI)	97
General manager: John Lelangue

Acqua & Sapone
No.	Rider	Pos.
11	Stefano Garzelli (ITA)	DNF-20
12	Dario Andriotto (ITA)	142
13	Massimo Codol (ITA)	43
14	Alessandro Donati (ITA)	75
15	Francesco Failli (ITA)	65
16	Andrea Masciarelli (ITA)	DNF-8
17 †	Francesco Masciarelli (ITA)	DNF-8
18	Vladimir Miholjević (CRO)	25
19 †	Cayetano Sarmiento (COL)	47
General manager: Franco Gini

Ag2r–La Mondiale
No.	Rider	Pos.
21 †	Guillaume Bonnafond (FRA)	DNF-6
22	Hubert Dupont (FRA)	20
23	Alexander Efimkin (RUS)	19
24	John Gadret (FRA)	13
25	Sébastien Hinault (FRA)	100
26	Yuriy Krivtsov (UKR)	83
27	Rene Mandri (EST)	DNF-11
28	Anthony Ravard (FRA)	DNF-13
29	Ludovic Turpin (FRA)	67
General manager: Vincent Lavenu

Androni Giocattoli
No.	Rider	Pos.
31	Michele Scarponi (ITA)	4
32	Leonardo Bertagnolli (ITA)	DNS-16
33	Alessandro Bertolini (ITA)	115
34	Rubens Bertogliati (SUI)	66
35	Alberto Loddo (ITA)	DNF-11
36	Carlos José Ochoa (VEN)	52
37 †	Jackson Rodríguez (VEN)	51
38	José Serpa (COL)	30
39	Cameron Wurf (AUS)	77
General manager: Gianni Savio

Astana
No.	Rider	Pos.
41	Alexander Vinokourov (KAZ)	6
42	Paolo Tiralongo (ITA)	DNF-6
43	Enrico Gasparotto (ITA)	DNF-11
44	Andriy Hryvko (UKR)	70
45	Josep Jufré (ESP)	42
46 †	Roman Kireyev (KAZ)	87
47	Valentin Iglinskiy (KAZ)	DNF-11
48	Gorazd Štangelj (SLO)	92
49	Alexsandr Dyachenko (KAZ)	DNF-11
Team manager: Lorenzo Lapage

Bbox Bouygues Telecom
No.	Rider	Pos.
51	Thomas Voeckler (FRA)	23
52	Yukiya Arashiro (JPN)	93
53	William Bonnet (FRA)	DNF-20
54	Anthony Charteau (FRA)	DNF-8
55	Mathieu Claude (FRA)	DNF-20
56 †	Damien Gaudin (FRA)	136
57 †	Guillaume Le Floch (FRA)	110
58	Yury Trofimov (RUS)	28
59	Johan Tschopp (SUI)	34
Team manager: Didier Rous

Caisse d'Epargne
No.	Rider	Pos.
61	Marzio Bruseghin (ITA)	DNS-7
62 †	Andrey Amador (CRC)	41
63	David Arroyo (ESP)	2
64 †	Arnold Jeannesson (FRA)	DNF-19
65	Vasil Kiryienka (BLR)	37
66	Pablo Lastras (ESP)	113
67	Alberto Losada (ESP)	53
68 †	Rigoberto Urán (COL)	35
69	Xabier Zandio (ESP)	62
Team manager: Neil Stephens

Cervélo TestTeam
No.	Rider	Pos.
71	Carlos Sastre (ESP)	8
72	Íñigo Cuesta (ESP)	85
73	Volodymir Gustov (UKR)	61
74	Ted King (USA)	114
75 †	Ignatas Konovalovas (LTU)	106
76	Daniel Lloyd (GBR)	103
77 †	Marcel Wyss (SUI)	38
78	Gabriel Rasch (NOR)	DNF-20
79	Xavier Tondó (ESP)	DNF-20
Team manager: Alex Sans Vega

Cofidis
No.	Rider	Pos.
81	David Moncoutié (FRA)	68
82 †	Guillaume Blot (FRA)	DNF-15
83	Mickaël Buffaz (FRA)	DNF-16
84 †	Rémi Cusin (FRA)	82
85	Leonardo Duque (COL)	63
86 †	Julien Fouchard (FRA)	119
87	Kalle Kriit (EST)	98
88	Nico Sijmens (BEL)	104
89	Damien Monier (FRA)	89
General manager: Éric Boyer

Colnago–CSF Inox
No.	Rider	Pos.
91	Domenico Pozzovivo (ITA)	DNF-13
92 †	Manuel Belletti (ITA)	DNF-15
93 †	Sacha Modolo (ITA)	DNF-8
94 †	Alessandro Bisolti (ITA)	74
95 †	Federico Canuti (ITA)	DNF-17
96 †	Marco Frapporti (ITA)	138
97	Alan Marangoni (ITA)	107
98 †	Simone Stortoni (ITA)	73
99 †	Stefano Pirazzi (ITA)	120
General manager: Roberto Reverberi

Footon–Servetto–Fuji
No.	Rider	Pos.
101 †	Ermanno Capelli (ITA)	DNF-16
102 †	Matthias Brändle (AUT)	90
103 †	Eros Capecchi (ITA)	DNS-7
104	Giampaolo Cheula (ITA)	DNF-15
105	Markus Eibegger (AUT)	48
106	Iban Mayoz (ESP)	22
107 †	Marco Corti (ITA)	139
108	Michele Merlo (ITA)	DNF-6
109	Martin Pedersen (DEN)	DNF-11
General manager: Mauro Gianetti

Garmin–Transitions
No.	Rider	Pos.
111	David Millar (GBR)	DNF-13
112	Christian Vande Velde (USA)	DNF-3
113	Tyler Farrar (USA)	DNS-15
114 †	Jack Bobridge (AUS)	DNS-13
115	Julian Dean (NZL)	DNS-19
116	Murilo Fischer (BRA)	112
117 †	Dan Martin (IRE)	57
118 †	Cameron Meyer (AUS)	137
119	Svein Tuft (CAN)	125
General manager: Jonathan Vaughters

Lampre–Farnese Vini
No.	Rider	Pos.
121	Damiano Cunego (ITA)	11
122	Alessandro Petacchi (ITA)	DNF-8
123	Gilberto Simoni (ITA)	69
124	Matteo Bono (ITA)	86
125	Danilo Hondo (GER)	DNS-19
126	Marco Marzano (ITA)	80
127	David Loosli (SUI)	DNF-17
128	Daniele Righi (ITA)	49
129	Alessandro Spezialetti (ITA)	118
General manager: Giuseppe Saronni

Liquigas–Doimo
No.	Rider	Pos.
131	Ivan Basso (ITA)	1
132	Vincenzo Nibali (ITA)	3
133 †	Valerio Agnoli (ITA)	32
134 †	Maciej Bodnar (POL)	127
135	Tiziano Dall'Antonia (ITA)	91
136 †	Robert Kišerlovski (CRO)	10
137 †	Fabio Sabatini (ITA)	101
138	Sylwester Szmyd (POL)	60
139	Alessandro Vanotti (ITA)	76
General manager: Roberto Amadio

Omega Pharma–Lotto
No.	Rider	Pos.
141	Sebastian Lang (GER)	71
142 †	Jan Bakelants (BEL)	36
143 †	Adam Blythe (GBR)	DNF-11
144 †	Francis De Greef (BEL)	21
145	Michiel Elijzen (NED)	111
146	Olivier Kaisen (BEL)	122
147	Matthew Lloyd (AUS)	50
148	Daniel Moreno (ESP)	26
149	Charly Wegelius (GBR)	29
General manager: Marc Sergeant

Quick-Step
No.	Rider	Pos.
151 †	Dario Cataldo (ITA)	DNF-19
152	Addy Engels (NED)	126
153	Mauro Facci (ITA)	121
154	Jérôme Pineau (FRA)	58
155	Francesco Reda (ITA)	DNF-17
156 †	Branislau Samoilau (BLR)	39
157	Matteo Tosatto (ITA)	56
158	Marco Velo (ITA)	108
159	Wouter Weylandt (BEL)	DNS-12
General manager: Patrick Lefevere

Rabobank
No.	Rider	Pos.
161 †	Steven Kruijswijk (NED)	18
162	Mauricio Ardila (COL)	15
163	Graeme Brown (AUS)	130
164	Rick Flens (NED)	135
165	Dmitri Kozontchuk (RUS)	DNF-8
166 †	Tom Stamsnijder (NED)	109
167 †	Bauke Mollema (NED)	12
168 †	Jos van Emden (NED)	116
169	Pieter Weening (NED)	24
General manager: Erik Breukink

Team Sky
No.	Rider	Pos.
171	Bradley Wiggins (GBR)	40
172	Michael Barry (CAN)	44
173	Dario Cioni (ITA)	17
174	Steve Cummings (GBR)	55
175 †	Chris Froome (GBR)	DSQ-19
176	Mathew Hayman (AUS)	105
177	Greg Henderson (NZL)	88
178	Morris Possoni (ITA)	DNF-13
179	Christopher Sutton (AUS)	133
General manager: Dave Brailsford

Team HTC–Columbia
No.	Rider	Pos.
181	André Greipel (GER)	DNS-19
182	Marco Pinotti (ITA)	9
183	Michael Albasini (SUI)	123
184 †	Matthew Goss (AUS)	DNF-15
185	Adam Hansen (AUS)	DNF-11
186 †	Craig Lewis (USA)	78
187	František Raboň (CZE)	134
188	Vicente Reynés (ESP)	117
189	Marcel Sieberg (GER)	DNF-19
Team manager: Tristan Hoffman

Team Katusha
No.	Rider	Pos.
191	Filippo Pozzato (ITA)	45
192	Vladimir Karpets (RUS)	14
193	Robbie McEwen (AUS)	DNS-15
194	Giampaolo Caruso (ITA)	46
195	Joan Horrach (ESP)	54
196 †	Mikhail Ignatiev (RUS)	131
197	Luca Mazzanti (ITA)	79
198	Evgeni Petrov (RUS)	31
199	Sergey Klimov (RUS)	94
General manager: Andrei Tchmil

Team Milram
No.	Rider	Pos.
201	Linus Gerdemann (GER)	16
202	Robert Förster (GER)	96
203	Markus Fothen (GER)	102
204	Luke Roberts (AUS)	124
205 †	Dominik Roels (GER)	DNS-12
206	Thomas Rohregger (AUT)	DNF-11
207	Matthias Russ (GER)	84
208 †	Paul Voss (GER)	DNF-15
209	Fabian Wegmann (GER)	DNF-8
General manager: Gerry van Gerwen

Team Saxo Bank
No.	Rider	Pos.
211 †	Anders Lund (DEN)	64
212	Baden Cooke (AUS)	DNS-9
213	Chris Anker Sørensen (DEN)	27
214	Nicki Sørensen (DEN)	72
215	Gustav Larsson (SWE)	59
216	Laurent Didier (LUX)	33
217	Lucas Sebastian Haedo (ARG)	128
218 †	Michael Mørkøv (DEN)	129
219 †	Richie Porte (AUS)	7
Team manager: Bradley McGee

== By rider ==
Legend
No.	Starting number worn by the rider during the Giro
Pos.	Position in the general classification
†	Denotes riders born on or after 1 January 1985 eligible for the Young rider classification
A pink jersey	Denotes the winner of the General classification
A red jersey	Denotes the winner of the Points classification
A green jersey	Denotes the winner of the Mountains classification
A white jersey	Denotes the winner of the Young rider classification (eligibility indicated by †)
DNS	Denotes a rider who did not start, followed by the stage before which he withdrew
DNF	Denotes a rider who did not finish, followed by the stage in which he withdrew
Age correct as of 8 May 2010, the date on which the Giro began

No.	Rider	Nationality	Team	Age	Pos.
1	Cadel Evans	Australia	BMC Racing Team	33	5
2	Brent Bookwalter	United States	BMC Racing Team	26	95
3	Martin Kohler	Switzerland	BMC Racing Team	24^{†}	DNF-2
4	Jeff Louder	United States	BMC Racing Team	32	DNF-11
5	Mauro Santambrogio	Italy	BMC Racing Team	25	DNF-11
6	John Murphy	United States	BMC Racing Team	25	DNF-8
7	Michael Schär	Switzerland	BMC Racing Team	23^{†}	99
8	Florian Stalder	Switzerland	BMC Racing Team	27	81
9	Danilo Wyss	Switzerland	BMC Racing Team	24^{†}	97
11	Stefano Garzelli	Italy	Acqua & Sapone	36	DNF-20
12	Dario Andriotto	Italy	Acqua & Sapone	37	132
13	Massimo Codol	Italy	Acqua & Sapone	37	43
14	Alessandro Donati	Italy	Acqua & Sapone	31	75
15	Francesco Failli	Italy	Acqua & Sapone	26	65
16	Andrea Masciarelli	Italy	Acqua & Sapone	27	DNF-8
17	Francesco Masciarelli	Italy	Acqua & Sapone	24^{†}	DNF-8
18	Vladimir Miholjević	Croatia	Acqua & Sapone	35	25
19	Cayetano Sarmiento	Colombia	Acqua & Sapone	23^{†}	47
21	Guillaume Bonnafond	France	Ag2r–La Mondiale	22^{†}	DNF-6
22	Hubert Dupont	France	Ag2r–La Mondiale	29	20
23	Alexander Efimkin	Russia	Ag2r–La Mondiale	28	19
24	John Gadret	France	Ag2r–La Mondiale	31	13
25	Sébastien Hinault	France	Ag2r–La Mondiale	36	100
26	Yuriy Krivtsov	Ukraine	Ag2r–La Mondiale	31	83
27	Rene Mandri	Estonia	Ag2r–La Mondiale	26	DNF-11
28	Anthony Ravard	France	Ag2r–La Mondiale	26	DNF-13
29	Ludovic Turpin	France	Ag2r–La Mondiale	35	67
31	Michele Scarponi	Italy	Androni Giocattoli	30	4
32	Leonardo Bertagnolli	Italy	Androni Giocattoli	32	DNS-16
33	Alessandro Bertolini	Italy	Androni Giocattoli	38	115
34	Rubens Bertogliati	Switzerland	Androni Giocattoli	30	66
35	Alberto Loddo	Italy	Androni Giocattoli	31	DNF-11
36	Carlos José Ochoa	Venezuela	Androni Giocattoli	29	52
37	Jackson Rodríguez	Venezuela	Androni Giocattoli	25^{†}	51
38	José Serpa	Colombia	Androni Giocattoli	31	30
39	Cameron Wurf	Australia	Androni Giocattoli	26	77
41	Alexander Vinokourov	Kazakhstan	Astana	36	6
42	Paolo Tiralongo	Italy	Astana	32	DNF-6
43	Enrico Gasparotto	Italy	Astana	28	DNF-11
44	Andriy Hryvko	Ukraine	Astana	26	70
45	Josep Jufré	Spain	Astana	34	42
46	Roman Kireyev	Kazakhstan	Astana	23^{†}	87
47	Valentin Iglinsky	Kazakhstan	Astana	28	DNF-11
48	Gorazd Štangelj	Slovenia	Astana	37	92
49	Alexsandr Dyachenko	Kazakhstan	Astana	26	DNF-11
51	Thomas Voeckler	France	Bbox Bouygues Telecom	30	23
52	Yukiya Arashiro	Japan	Bbox Bouygues Telecom	25	93
53	William Bonnet	France	Bbox Bouygues Telecom	27	DNF-20
54	Anthony Charteau	France	Bbox Bouygues Telecom	30	DNF-8
55	Mathieu Claude	France	Bbox Bouygues Telecom	27	DNF-20
56	Damien Gaudin	France	Bbox Bouygues Telecom	23^{†}	136
57	Guillaume Le Floch	France	Bbox Bouygues Telecom	25^{†}	110
58	Yuri Trofimov	Russia	Bbox Bouygues Telecom	26	28
59	Johann Tschopp	Switzerland	Bbox Bouygues Telecom	27	34
61	Marzio Bruseghin	Italy	Caisse d'Epargne	35	DNS-7
62	Andrey Amador	Costa Rica	Caisse d'Epargne	23^{†}	41
63	David Arroyo	Spain	Caisse d'Epargne	30	2
64	Arnold Jeannesson	France	Caisse d'Epargne	24^{†}	DNF-19
65	Vasil Kiryienka	Belarus	Caisse d'Epargne	28	37
66	Pablo Lastras	Spain	Caisse d'Epargne	34	113
67	Alberto Losada	Spain	Caisse d'Epargne	28	53
68	Rigoberto Urán	Colombia	Caisse d'Epargne	23^{†}	35
69	Xabier Zandio	Spain	Caisse d'Epargne	33	62
71	Carlos Sastre	Spain	Cervélo TestTeam	35	8
72	Íñigo Cuesta	Spain	Cervélo TestTeam	40	85
73	Volodymir Gustov	Ukraine	Cervélo TestTeam	33	61
74	Ted King	United States	Cervélo TestTeam	27	114
75	Ignatas Konovalovas	Lithuania	Cervélo TestTeam	24^{†}	106
76	Daniel Lloyd	Great Britain	Cervélo TestTeam	29	103
77	Marcel Wyss	Switzerland	Cervélo TestTeam	23^{†}	38
78	Gabriel Rasch	Norway	Cervélo TestTeam	34	DNF-20
79	Xavier Tondó	Spain	Cervélo TestTeam	31	DNF-20
81	David Moncoutié	France	Cofidis	35	68
82	Guillaume Blot	France	Cofidis	25^{†}	DNF-15
83	Mickaël Buffaz	France	Cofidis	30	DNF-16
84	Rémi Cusin	France	Cofidis	24^{†}	82
85	Leonardo Duque	Colombia	Cofidis	30	63
86	Julien Fouchard	France	Cofidis	23^{†}	119
87	Kalle Kriit	Estonia	Cofidis	26	98
88	Nico Sijmens	Belgium	Cofidis	31	104
89	Damien Monier	France	Cofidis	27	89
91	Domenico Pozzovivo	Italy	Colnago–CSF Inox	27	DNF-13
92	Manuel Belletti	Italy	Colnago–CSF Inox	24^{†}	DNF-15
93	Sacha Modolo	Italy	Colnago–CSF Inox	22^{†}	DNF-8
94	Alessandro Bisolti	Italy	Colnago–CSF Inox	25^{†}	74
95	Federico Canuti	Italy	Colnago–CSF Inox	24^{†}	DNF-17
96	Marco Frapporti	Italy	Colnago–CSF Inox	25^{†}	138
97	Alan Marangoni	Italy	Colnago–CSF Inox	25	107
98	Simone Stortoni	Italy	Colnago–CSF Inox	24^{†}	73
99	Stefano Pirazzi	Italy	Colnago–CSF Inox	23^{†}	120
101	Ermanno Capelli	Italy	Footon–Servetto–Fuji	24^{†}	DNF-16
102	Matthias Brändle	Austria	Footon–Servetto–Fuji	20^{†}	90
103	Eros Capecchi	Italy	Footon–Servetto–Fuji	23^{†}	DNS-7
104	Giampaolo Cheula	Italy	Footon–Servetto–Fuji	30	DNF-15
105	Markus Eibegger	Austria	Footon–Servetto–Fuji	25	48
106	Iban Mayoz	Spain	Footon–Servetto–Fuji	28	22
107	Marco Corti	Italy	Footon–Servetto–Fuji	24^{†}	139
108	Michele Merlo	Italy	Footon–Servetto–Fuji	25	DNF-6
109	Martin Pedersen	Denmark	Footon–Servetto–Fuji	27	DNF-11
111	David Millar	Great Britain	Garmin–Transitions	33	DNF-13
112	Christian Vande Velde	United States	Garmin–Transitions	33	DNF-3
113	Tyler Farrar	United States	Garmin–Transitions	25	DNS-15
114	Jack Bobridge	Australia	Garmin–Transitions	20^{†}	DNS-13
115	Julian Dean	New Zealand	Garmin–Transitions	35	DNS-19
116	Murilo Fischer	Brazil	Garmin–Transitions	30	112
117	Dan Martin	Ireland	Garmin–Transitions	23^{†}	57
118	Cameron Meyer	Australia	Garmin–Transitions	22^{†}	137
119	Svein Tuft	Canada	Garmin–Transitions	32	125
121	Damiano Cunego	Italy	Lampre–Farnese Vini	28	11
122	Alessandro Petacchi	Italy	Lampre–Farnese Vini	36	DNF-8
123	Gilberto Simoni	Italy	Lampre–Farnese Vini	38	69
124	Matteo Bono	Italy	Lampre–Farnese Vini	26	86
125	Danilo Hondo	Germany	Lampre–Farnese Vini	36	DNS-19
126	Marco Marzano	Italy	Lampre–Farnese Vini	29	80
127	David Loosli	Switzerland	Lampre–Farnese Vini	30	DNF-17
128	Daniele Righi	Italy	Lampre–Farnese Vini	34	49
129	Alessandro Spezialetti	Italy	Lampre–Farnese Vini	35	118
131	Ivan Basso	Italy	Liquigas–Doimo	32	1
132	Vincenzo Nibali	Italy	Liquigas–Doimo	25	3
133	Valerio Agnoli	Italy	Liquigas–Doimo	25^{†}	32
134	Maciej Bodnar	Poland	Liquigas–Doimo	25^{†}	127
135	Tiziano Dall'Antonia	Italy	Liquigas–Doimo	26	91
136	Robert Kišerlovski	Croatia	Liquigas–Doimo	23^{†}	10
137	Fabio Sabatini	Italy	Liquigas–Doimo	25^{†}	101
138	Sylwester Szmyd	Poland	Liquigas–Doimo	32	60
139	Alessandro Vanotti	Italy	Liquigas–Doimo	29	76
141	Sebastian Lang	Germany	Omega Pharma–Lotto	30	71
142	Jan Bakelants	Belgium	Omega Pharma–Lotto	24^{†}	36
143	Adam Blythe	Great Britain	Omega Pharma–Lotto	20^{†}	DNF-11
144	Francis De Greef	Belgium	Omega Pharma–Lotto	25^{†}	21
145	Michiel Elijzen	Netherlands	Omega Pharma–Lotto	27	111
146	Olivier Kaisen	Belgium	Omega Pharma–Lotto	27	122
147	Matthew Lloyd	Australia	Omega Pharma–Lotto	26	50
148	Daniel Moreno	Spain	Omega Pharma–Lotto	28	26
149	Charly Wegelius	Great Britain	Omega Pharma–Lotto	32	29
151	Dario Cataldo	Italy	Quick-Step	25^{†}	DNF-19
152	Addy Engels	Netherlands	Quick-Step	32	126
153	Mauro Facci	Italy	Quick-Step	27	121
154	Jérôme Pineau	France	Quick-Step	30	58
155	Francesco Reda	Italy	Quick-Step	27	DNF-17
156	Branislau Samoilau	Belarus	Quick-Step	24^{†}	39
157	Matteo Tosatto	Italy	Quick-Step	35	56
158	Marco Velo	Italy	Quick-Step	36	108
159	Wouter Weylandt	Belgium	Quick-Step	25	DNS-12
161	Steven Kruijswijk	Netherlands	Rabobank	22^{†}	18
162	Mauricio Ardila	Colombia	Rabobank	30	15
163	Graeme Brown	Australia	Rabobank	31	130
164	Rick Flens	Netherlands	Rabobank	27	135
165	Dmitry Kozonchuk	Russia	Rabobank	26	DNF-8
166	Tom Stamsnijder	Netherlands	Rabobank	24^{†}	109
167	Bauke Mollema	Netherlands	Rabobank	23^{†}	12
168	Jos van Emden	Netherlands	Rabobank	25^{†}	116
169	Pieter Weening	Netherlands	Rabobank	29	24
171	Bradley Wiggins	Great Britain	Team Sky	30	40
172	Michael Barry	Australia	Team Sky	35	44
173	Dario Cioni	Italy	Team Sky	35	17
174	Steve Cummings	Great Britain	Team Sky	29	55
175	Chris Froome	Great Britain	Team Sky	24^{†}	DSQ-19
176	Mathew Hayman	Australia	Team Sky	32	105
177	Greg Henderson	New Zealand	Team Sky	33	88
178	Morris Possoni	Italy	Team Sky	25	DNF-13
179	Christopher Sutton	Australia	Team Sky	25	133
181	André Greipel	Germany	Team HTC–Columbia	27	DNS-19
182	Marco Pinotti	Italy	Team HTC–Columbia	34	9
183	Michael Albasini	Switzerland	Team HTC–Columbia	29	123
184	Matthew Goss	Australia	Team HTC–Columbia	23^{†}	DNF-15
185	Adam Hansen	Australia	Team HTC–Columbia	28	DNF-11
186	Craig Lewis	United States	Team HTC–Columbia	25^{†}	78
187	František Raboň	Czech Republic	Team HTC–Columbia	26	134
188	Vicente Reynés	Spain	Team HTC–Columbia	28	117
189	Marcel Sieberg	Germany	Team HTC–Columbia	28	DNF-19
191	Filippo Pozzato	Italy	Team Katusha	28	45
192	Vladimir Karpets	Russia	Team Katusha	29	14
193	Robbie McEwen	Australia	Team Katusha	37	DNS-15
194	Giampaolo Caruso	Italy	Team Katusha	29	46
195	Joan Horrach	Spain	Team Katusha	36	54
196	Mikhail Ignatiev	Russia	Team Katusha	25^{†}	131
197	Luca Mazzanti	Italy	Team Katusha	36	79
198	Evgeni Petrov	Russia	Team Katusha	31	31
199	Sergey Klimov	Russia	Team Katusha	29	94
201	Linus Gerdemann	Germany	Team Milram	27	16
202	Robert Förster	Germany	Team Milram	32	96
203	Markus Fothen	Germany	Team Milram	28	102
204	Luke Roberts	Australia	Team Milram	33	124
205	Dominik Roels	Germany	Team Milram	23^{†}	DNS-12
206	Thomas Rohregger	Austria	Team Milram	27	DNF-11
207	Matthias Russ	Germany	Team Milram	26	84
208	Paul Voss	Germany	Team Milram	24^{†}	DNF-15
209	Fabian Wegmann	Germany	Team Milram	29	DNF-8
211	Anders Lund	Denmark	Team Saxo Bank	25^{†}	64
212	Baden Cooke	Australia	Team Saxo Bank	31	DNS-9
213	Chris Anker Sørensen	Denmark	Team Saxo Bank	25	27
214	Nicki Sørensen	Denmark	Team Saxo Bank	34	72
215	Gustav Larsson	Sweden	Team Saxo Bank	29	59
216	Laurent Didier	Luxembourg	Team Saxo Bank	25	33
217	Lucas Sebastián Haedo	Argentina	Team Saxo Bank	27	128
218	Michael Mørkøv	Denmark	Team Saxo Bank	25^{†}	129
219	Richie Porte	Australia	Team Saxo Bank	25^{†}	7

== By nationality ==
Country	No. of riders	Finishers	Stage wins
Italy	53	32 (60.38%)	7 (Filippo Pozzato, Manuel Belletti, Vincenzo Nibali, Ivan Basso, Stefano Garzelli, Michele Scarponi + Liquigas–Doimo)
France	20	12 (60.00%)	2 (Jérôme Pineau, Damien Monier)
Australia	15	10 (66.67%)	3 (Matthew Lloyd, Cadel Evans, Matthew Goss)
Spain	12	11 (91.67%)	0
Germany	11	5 (45.45%)	1 ˙(André Greipel)
Switzerland	9	7 (77.78%)	1 (Johann Tschopp)
Netherlands	8	8 (100.00%)	0
Great Britain	7	4 (57.14%)	1 (Bradley Wiggins)
Russia	7	6 (85.71%)	1 (Evgeni Petrov)
United States	7	3 (42.86%)	2 (Tyler Farrar x2)
Belgium	5	4 (80.00%)	1 (Wouter Weylandt)
Colombia	5	5 (100.00%)	0
Denmark	5	4 (80.00%)	1 (Chris Anker Sørensen)
Kazakhstan	4	2 (50.00%)	0
Austria	3	2 (66.67%)	0
Ukraine	3	3 (100.00%)	0
Belarus	2	2 (100.00%)	0
Croatia	2	2 (100.00%)	0
Estonia	2	1 (50.00%)	0
New Zealand	2	1 (50.00%)	0
Poland	2	2 (100.00%)	0
Venezuela	2	2 (100.00%)	0
Argentina	1	1 (100.00%)	0
Brazil	1	1 (100.00%)	0
Canada	1	1 (100.00%)	0
Costa Rica	1	1 (100.00%)	0
Czech Republic	1	1 (100.00%)	0
Ireland	1	1 (100.00%)	0
Japan	1	1 (100.00%)	0
Lithuania	1	1 (100.00%)	0
Luxembourg	1	1 (100.00%)	0
Norway	1	0 (00.00%)	0
Slovenia	1	1 (100.00%)	0
Sweden	1	1 (100.00%)	1 (Gustav Larsson)
TOTAL'	198	139 (70.20%)	21
