= 2010 Giro d'Italia, Stage 12 to Stage 21 =

Cycling race stages

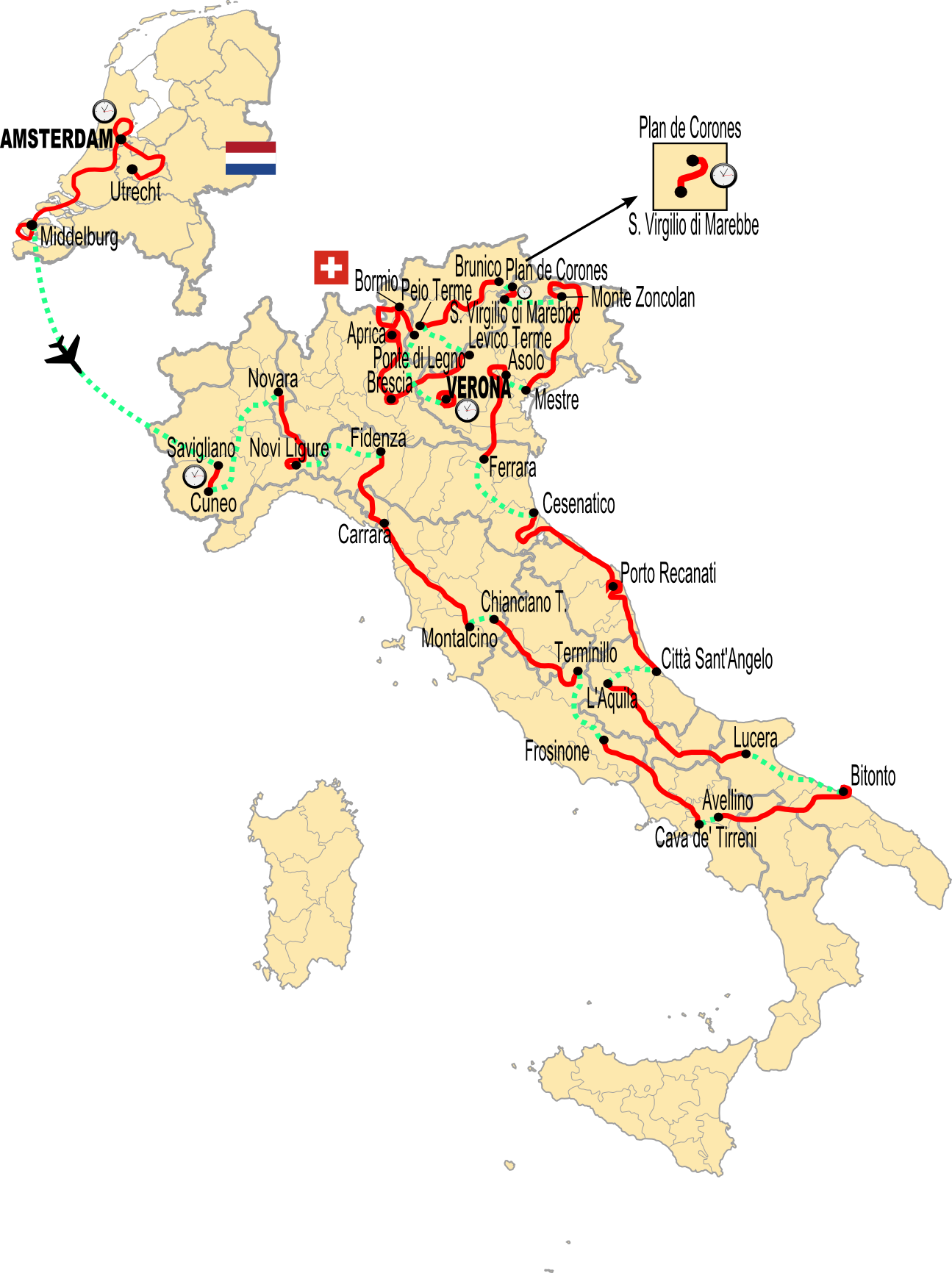
Overview of the stages; red lines represent the route of the individual stages, while green lines indicate transfers between the stages

Stage 12 of the 2010 Giro d'Italia took place on 20 May in Città Sant'Angelo, and the race concluded with stage 21 in Verona on 30 May. Seven of the last ten stages in the race contained mountain climbs, including the uphill individual time trial to Plan de Corones four days before the end of the race. The last eight stages were clustered in northeast Italy, with six summit finishes among them.

One of the highlights of the second half of the Giro was Monte Zoncolan; although its peak is not as high as other climbs in the race, its gradients are extremely difficult, averaging at 12% with maximum stretches of 22%. Ivan Basso won this stage, and in so doing positioned himself well for the conclusion of the race.

As the second half of the Giro began, young Australian Richie Porte held the race leadership by way of having been in a fortunate 50-rider strong breakaway in stage 11. The first two stages of the Giro's second half were flat and did not alter the overall standings in any significant way. A mountain climb to Monte Grappa in stage 14 transferred the race leader's pink jersey to David Arroyo of the Caisse d'Epargne team. Arroyo, a skilled descender, tried to hold off Ivan Basso and the Liquigas–Doimo team in the Giro's final stages, but on a relatively easy climb to Aprica in stage 19, Basso took the pink jersey for the first time en route to his second career Giro crown.

Legend
A pink jersey	Denotes the leader of the General classification	A green jersey	Denotes the leader of the Mountains classification
A red jersey	Denotes the leader of the Points classification	A white jersey	Denotes the leader of the Young rider classification
	s.t. indicates that the rider crossed the finish line in the same group as the one receiving the time above him, and was therefore credited with the same finishing time.		

== Stage 12 ==
20 May 2010 — Città Sant'Angelo to Porto Recanati, 191 km (119 mi)

There were two small categorized climbs toward the end of the stage, the first of which marked the race's entrance into the province of Macerata, on roads often visited by Tirreno–Adriatico. The riders saw the finish line in Porto Recanati twice, taking a finishing circuit in the town.

Rabobank's Rick Flens attacked 9 km (5.6 mi) into the stage, to form the day's principal breakaway. He rode alone for a time, but 32 km (20 mi) later, Yuriy Krivtsov and Olivier Kaisen made the bridge to join him. The peloton was mindful not to give them an enormous time gap like the breakaway in stage 11 had gotten. Garmin–Transitions, working for the Giro's only double stage winner Tyler Farrar, took the pace, and kept the time gap manageable. The trio had 9'37" at one point, but as the circuit in Porto Recanati began, their advantage was just 1'10". With 14 km (8.7 mi) left to race, the three-rider breakaway was brought back into the peloton.

At that point, counterattacks began. Francesco Faili and four others briefly came clear, but they were not able to stay away for the stage win either. When their group was brought back, a ten-rider group containing several overall contenders, including Damiano Cunego, Michele Scarponi, Stefano Garzelli, Ivan Basso, Vincenzo Nibali, and Alexander Vinokourov got free on the third-category climb preceding the finish. Their advantage never extended beyond a few seconds, but they stayed away and finished 10 seconds ahead of the rest of the peloton. Filippo Pozzato, the strongest sprinter in the group and the rider with the least overall chances, won the stage. Pozzato was the first Italian rider to win a stage in this Giro, and it was his first career Giro stage win.

Behind them, in the peloton, Cadel Evans was the most notable rider to miss the selection. He tried to force the pace to bring the break back, but clashed with Daniele Righi at the front of the peloton. Righi was trying to ride a much slower pace to allow his teammate Cunego the chance to stay away for victory. Evans and Righi nearly came to blows after the stage. They were both later fined by the UCI, though they shook hands and made up before the next stage. The top ten to the overall standings were unchanged by the day's results.

Stage 12 result

	Rider	Team	Time
1	Filippo Pozzato (ITA)	Team Katusha	5h 15' 50"
2	Thomas Voeckler (FRA)	Bbox Bouygues Telecom	s.t.
3	Jérôme Pineau (FRA)	Quick-Step	s.t.
4	Stefano Garzelli (ITA)	Acqua & Sapone	s.t.
5	Alexander Vinokourov (KAZ)	Astana	s.t.
6	Vincenzo Nibali (ITA)	Liquigas–Doimo	s.t.
7	Marco Pinotti (ITA)	Team HTC–Columbia	s.t.
8	Michele Scarponi (ITA)	Androni Giocattoli	s.t.
9	Damiano Cunego (ITA)	Lampre–Farnese Vini	s.t.
10	Ivan Basso (ITA)	Liquigas–Doimo	s.t.

General classification after stage 12

	Rider	Team	Time
1	Richie Porte (AUS)	Team Saxo Bank	50h 46' 16"
2	David Arroyo (ESP)	Caisse d'Epargne	+ 1' 42"
3	Robert Kišerlovski (CRO)	Liquigas–Doimo	+ 1' 56"
4	Xavier Tondó (ESP)	Cervélo TestTeam	+ 3' 54"
5	Valerio Agnoli (ITA)	Liquigas–Doimo	+ 4' 41"
6	Alexander Efimkin (RUS)	Ag2r–La Mondiale	+ 5' 16"
7	Linus Gerdemann (GER)	Team Milram	+ 5' 34"
8	Carlos Sastre (ESP)	Cervélo TestTeam	+ 7' 09"
9	Laurent Didier (LUX)	Team Saxo Bank	+ 7' 24"
10	Bradley Wiggins (GBR)	Team Sky	+ 8' 14"

== Stage 13 ==
21 May 2010 — Porto Recanati to Cesenatico, 222 km (138 mi)

The first two-thirds of the course was mainly flat, following the Adriatic coast. The route then cut inland for two climbs, including one with a maximum gradient of 18%. The stage finished with 40 km (25 mi) of descending or flat racing. The arrival town of Cesenatico was the hometown of Marco Pantani, and the stage commemorated him.

Seventeen riders from 16 teams formed the day's breakaway, coming together as a cohesive group after 62 km (39 mi) of racing. Team Katusha was the only team with two riders in the move; they were Joan Horrach and Sergei Klimov. Iban Mayoz in 26th overall was the highest-placed man in the group, over 16 minutes behind race leader Richie Porte, so the peloton had little interest in chasing this escape group. Their maximum advantage over the main field was eight and a half minutes. On the Perticara climb, the first of the day, Vladimir Karpets, who had been in 19th overall and represented a much bigger overall threat than anyone in the escape, attacked and came clear of the peloton. He eventually found Horrach, who paced him as far as he could before hitting the wall. Liquigas–Doimo tried to mount a chase to bring back Karpets, but he stayed away and gained two minutes against the peloton. He also moved up five places in the overall standings, passing both Ivan Basso and Vincenzo Nibali to be 14th overall at day's end.

On the descent of the Perticara, various riders in the slightly depleted leading group attacked, but none succeeded in escaping. Kalle Kriit, Mayoz, Tom Stamsnijder, Mauro Facci, and Cameron Meyer eventually took a lead over the others for a few kilometers, though most of the breakaway group again came together as the finish line neared. Craig Lewis tried to solo for the stage win with an attack from 1,500 m (4,900 ft) out. He seemed poised for victory for a few moments, but the group caught him 100 m (330 ft) from the end of the stage. Manuel Belletti from the small Colnago–CSF Inox team outsprinted Greg Henderson to win the stage. Belletti is from the area where the stage ended. He recalled after the stage that in his youth his father would take him to see Pantani ride, and he dedicated the victory to both of them. The peloton finished 7'28" back on the stage, but other than for Karpets' attack there was no major change to the overall standings.

Stage 13 result

	Rider	Team	Time
1	Manuel Belletti (ITA)	Colnago–CSF Inox	5h 27' 12"
2	Greg Henderson (NZL)	Team Sky	s.t.
3	Iban Mayoz (ESP)	Footon–Servetto–Fuji	s.t.
4	Paul Voss (GER)	Team Milram	s.t.
5	Sebastian Lang (GER)	Omega Pharma–Lotto	s.t.
6	Kalle Kriit (EST)	Cofidis	s.t.
7	Mathieu Claude (FRA)	Bbox Bouygues Telecom	s.t.
8	Craig Lewis (USA)	Team HTC–Columbia	s.t.
9	Sergey Klimov (RUS)	Team Katusha	s.t.
10	Cameron Meyer (AUS)	Garmin–Transitions	+ 5"

General classification after stage 13

	Rider	Team	Time
1	Richie Porte (AUS)	Team Saxo Bank	56h 20' 56"
2	David Arroyo (ESP)	Caisse d'Epargne	+ 1' 42"
3	Robert Kišerlovski (CRO)	Liquigas–Doimo	+ 1' 56"
4	Xavier Tondó (ESP)	Cervélo TestTeam	+ 3' 54"
5	Valerio Agnoli (ITA)	Liquigas–Doimo	+ 4' 41"
6	Alexander Efimkin (RUS)	Ag2r–La Mondiale	+ 5' 16"
7	Linus Gerdemann (GER)	Team Milram	+ 5' 34"
8	Carlos Sastre (ESP)	Cervélo TestTeam	+ 7' 09"
9	Laurent Didier (LUX)	Team Saxo Bank	+ 7' 24"
10	Bradley Wiggins (GBR)	Team Sky	+ 8' 14"

== Stage 14 ==
22 May 2010 — Ferrara to Asolo (Monte Grappa), 201 km (125 mi)

Monte Grappa, which used to feature frequently in the Giro, was the first of several major climbs in the Giro's final week. It was the only categorized climb in this stage, and reached with just over 40 km (25 mi) remaining. The race took the hardest route up the climb, which averages 8% gradients with maximum gradients of 14%.

The pace was high in the peloton as the stage began. This was one of the few stages in the Giro to this point run in nice weather. After 35 km (22 mi) were covered, and nearly an hour spent racing, Markus Eibegger instigated the day's breakaway, being followed in his attack by four others. The peloton let them get an advantage of over eight minutes by the 60 km (37 mi) mark. The time gap hovered there until the Grappa began, at which point Lampre–Farnese Vini and Androni Giocattoli led a coordinated chase. Bradley Wiggins attacked out of the group of favorites and found his teammate Steven Cummings, a member of the original breakaway, up the road. While Cummings paced him to a gap before cracking, Wiggins was unable to stay away for very long. Vincenzo Nibali was the next on the attack, drawing with him Michele Scarponi. Cadel Evans and Ivan Basso made the bridge, and the four of them absorbed the remnants of the morning escape, quickly becoming the leading group on the road. The climb went above the tree line, meaning there was wind and rain facing the riders at the top of the Grappa. Basso was first over the line for the mountain sprint, but it was Nibali who took aggressive lines on the descent, soloing to the finish 23 seconds ahead of the other three. Basso did not work in the chase, protecting the interests of his teammate up the road, but took the sprint for second place and the 12 bonus seconds it afforded. The race lead transferred as a result of the day's racing; overnight leader Richie Porte finished over four minutes behind Nibali and lost the jersey to David Arroyo. Arroyo also lost time on the stage, but did not lose as much. Having also been in the important breakaway in stage 11, Arroyo was in position to take the pink jersey.

Stage 14 result

	Rider	Team	Time
1	Vincenzo Nibali (ITA)	Liquigas–Doimo	4h 57' 51"
2	Ivan Basso (ITA)	Liquigas–Doimo	+ 23"
3	Michele Scarponi (ITA)	Androni Giocattoli	+ 23"
4	Cadel Evans (AUS)	BMC Racing Team	+ 23"
5	Alexander Vinokourov (KAZ)	Astana	+ 1' 34"
6	Branislau Samoilau (BLR)	Quick-Step	+ 2' 25"
7	Bauke Mollema (NED)	Rabobank	+ 2' 25"
8	Damiano Cunego (ITA)	Lampre–Farnese Vini	+ 2' 25"
9	Linus Gerdemann (GER)	Team Milram	+ 2' 25"
10	Marco Pinotti (ITA)	Team HTC–Columbia	+ 2' 25"

General classification after stage 14

	Rider	Team	Time
1	David Arroyo (ESP)	Caisse d'Epargne	61h 22' 54"
2	Richie Porte (AUS)	Team Saxo Bank	+ 39"
3	Xavier Tondó (ESP)	Cervélo TestTeam	+ 2' 12"
4	Robert Kišerlovski (CRO)	Liquigas–Doimo	+ 2' 35"
5	Linus Gerdemann (GER)	Team Milram	+ 3' 52"
6	Carlos Sastre (ESP)	Cervélo TestTeam	+ 5' 27"
7	Bradley Wiggins (GBR)	Team Sky	+ 6' 32"
8	Vincenzo Nibali (ITA)	Liquigas–Doimo	+ 6' 51"
9	Alexander Vinokourov (KAZ)	Astana	+ 7' 15"
10	Cadel Evans (AUS)	BMC Racing Team	+ 7' 26"

== Stage 15 ==
23 May 2010 — Mestre to Zoncolan, 218 km (135 mi)

The first 70 km (43 mi) of this stage were flat, preceding some heavy climbing. The finish was on the 10.1 km (6.3 mi) long Monte Zoncolan, with an average gradient of 12%, and stretches of up to 22%. It was preceded on the course by three other climbs. This was the third passage of the Giro over the Zoncolan; Gilberto Simoni won each of the first two, in 2003 and 2007.

In the flat section of the course, six riders opened up a substantial lead on the peloton. These were Ludovic Turpin, Jackson Rodríguez, Guillaume Le Floch, Nico Sijmens, Jérôme Pineau, and Francesco Reda. The peloton gave them 14 minutes, but with the massive Zoncolan climb ahead, there was little chance that they would stay away. Liquigas–Doimo, one of the few squads that still had all nine riders in the Giro, drove a very hard pace in the main field when the climbing began. The time gap fell slowly on the day's first climb, the Sella Chianzutanis, but the second, the Passo Duron, was far steeper and took its toll on the leaders. There were five left out front with just over three minutes' advantage on a depleted peloton of about 25 riders able to keep Liquigas–Doimo's pace.

The Zoncolan climb completely broke the race open. Very few riders climbed the mountain together, and the overall favorites quickly absorbed the remnants of the morning breakaway. An attack from Michele Scarponi opened things up in the favorites' group, and Ivan Basso was the first to respond. Basso drew with him Marco Pinotti and Cadel Evans, as Alexander Vinokourov, Carlos Sastre, and Bradley Wiggins all fell off the pace. Wiggins cracked badly as the Zoncolan climb wore on, and lost more than 25 minutes, to fall conclusively out of any overall contention. Race leader David Arroyo was also dropped on the climb.

Basso put in repeated attacks in the front of the race. He succeeded in dropping Pinotti and Scarponi, but Evans held the pace for a while. Finally, with 3.7 km (2.3 mi) left to race, Basso was able to drop the Australian, and soloed through the hardest parts of the climb for victory by over a minute. This gap was the largest among the contenders, as from Evans in second to Arroyo in 11th only two and a half minutes passed. Arroyo kept the pink jersey, but Basso's deficit in the overall standings was greatly reduced, as he leapt from 11th to third in the general classification with the day's results.

Stage 15 result

	Rider	Team	Time
1	Ivan Basso (ITA)	Liquigas–Doimo	6h 21' 58"
2	Cadel Evans (AUS)	BMC Racing Team	+ 1' 19"
3	Michele Scarponi (ITA)	Androni Giocattoli	+ 1' 30"
4	Damiano Cunego (ITA)	Lampre–Farnese Vini	+ 1' 58"
5	Alexander Vinokourov (KAZ)	Astana	+ 2' 26"
6	Carlos Sastre (ESP)	Cervélo TestTeam	+ 2' 44"
7	Vincenzo Nibali (ITA)	Liquigas–Doimo	+ 3' 07"
8	Marco Pinotti (ITA)	Team HTC–Columbia	+ 3' 20"
9	Dan Martin (IRE)	Garmin–Transitions	+ 3' 31"
10	John Gadret (FRA)	Ag2r–La Mondiale	+ 3' 46"

General classification after stage 15

	Rider	Team	Time
1	David Arroyo (ESP)	Caisse d'Epargne	67h 48' 42"
2	Richie Porte (AUS)	Team Saxo Bank	+ 2' 35"
3	Ivan Basso (ITA)	Liquigas–Doimo	+ 3' 33"
4	Carlos Sastre (ESP)	Cervélo TestTeam	+ 4' 21"
5	Cadel Evans (AUS)	BMC Racing Team	+ 4' 43"
6	Alexander Vinokourov (KAZ)	Astana	+ 5' 51"
7	Vincenzo Nibali (ITA)	Liquigas–Doimo	+ 6' 08"
8	Michele Scarponi (ITA)	Androni Giocattoli	+ 6' 34"
9	Linus Gerdemann (GER)	Team Milram	+ 7' 12"
10	Robert Kišerlovski (CRO)	Liquigas–Doimo	+ 8' 13"

== Stage 16 ==
25 May 2010 — Mareo to Plan de Corones, 12.9 km (8.0 mi) (individual time trial)

After the second rest day, in Friuli, the peloton faced the Giro's third race against the clock, and second individual race. It consisted of the climb to Plan de Corones, visited for the second time in the Giro's history. With 1,080 m (3,540 ft) of vertical gain in 12.9 km (8.0 mi), the climb had an average gradient of 8.5%. Its steepest stretches, in the final kilometer, were on a 24% grade, and the final 5.2 km of the course is on a dirt road.

Riders were staggered into three groups of approximately 50, with a 90-minute break in between the groups. This was necessary because there was not enough room at the top of the Plan de Corones to hold the entire Giro peloton and caravan; during the breaks, the riders who had just ridden the climb descended the same way they came up. The course was run on a narrow access road to a ski resort.

The best time through the first two groups came from Caisse d'Epargne's Rigoberto Urán, who stopped the clock in 43' 04". Early in the third group came former Giro champion Stefano Garzelli, who was over 90 seconds better than Urán to claim the top spot. Garzelli's ride held up to the end of the day as the stage winning time, Garzelli's first Giro stage win since 2007. He expressed surprise at his win when asked after the stage, and said it was one of his "nicest" wins of his career. The biggest surprise of the day was Ag2r–La Mondiale's John Gadret turning in a third place ride, the only rider other than Evans within a minute of Garzelli's winning time.

Later on came the Giro's overall favorites. Among them, Cadel Evans turned in the best ride, second on the day 42 seconds the lesser of Garzelli despite having the best time at the intermediate time check. Carlos Sastre lost more time, with a 19th place ride dropping two minutes. Liquigas–Doimo's two leaders Ivan Basso and Vincenzo Nibali both had top-ten rides to solidify their positions in the standings, though Evans closed his deficit to Basso considerably with his ride and leapfrogged Sastre in the standings. Race leader David Arroyo was 16th, over two minutes back on the day, but still had enough time in hand to retain the pink jersey.

Stage 16 result

	Rider	Team	Time
1	Stefano Garzelli (ITA)	Acqua & Sapone	41' 28"
2	Cadel Evans (AUS)	BMC Racing Team	+ 42"
3	John Gadret (FRA)	Ag2r–La Mondiale	+ 54"
4	Vincenzo Nibali (ITA)	Liquigas–Doimo	+ 1' 01"
5	Michele Scarponi (ITA)	Androni Giocattoli	+ 1' 07"
6	Ivan Basso (ITA)	Liquigas–Doimo	+ 1' 10"
7	Rigoberto Urán (COL)	Caisse d'Epargne	+ 1' 36"
8	Alexander Vinokourov (KAZ)	Astana	+ 1' 37"
9	Dario Cataldo (ITA)	Quick-Step	+ 1' 41"
10	Evgeni Petrov (RUS)	Team Katusha	+ 1' 46"

General classification after stage 16

	Rider	Team	Time
1	David Arroyo (ESP)	Caisse d'Epargne	68h 32' 26"
2	Ivan Basso (ITA)	Liquigas–Doimo	+ 2' 27"
3	Richie Porte (AUS)	Team Saxo Bank	+ 2' 36"
4	Cadel Evans (AUS)	BMC Racing Team	+ 3' 09"
5	Carlos Sastre (ESP)	Cervélo TestTeam	+ 4' 36"
6	Vincenzo Nibali (ITA)	Liquigas–Doimo	+ 4' 53"
7	Alexander Vinokourov (KAZ)	Astana	+ 5' 12"
8	Michele Scarponi (ITA)	Androni Giocattoli	+ 5' 25"
9	Robert Kišerlovski (CRO)	Liquigas–Doimo	+ 8' 57"
10	Damiano Cunego (ITA)	Lampre–Farnese Vini	+ 9' 13"

== Stage 17 ==
26 May 2010 — Bruneck to Pejo Terme, 173 km (107 mi)

This was categorized as an intermediate stage. It included a summit stage finish, though a higher pass, the Passo delle Palade, occurs earlier in the stage.

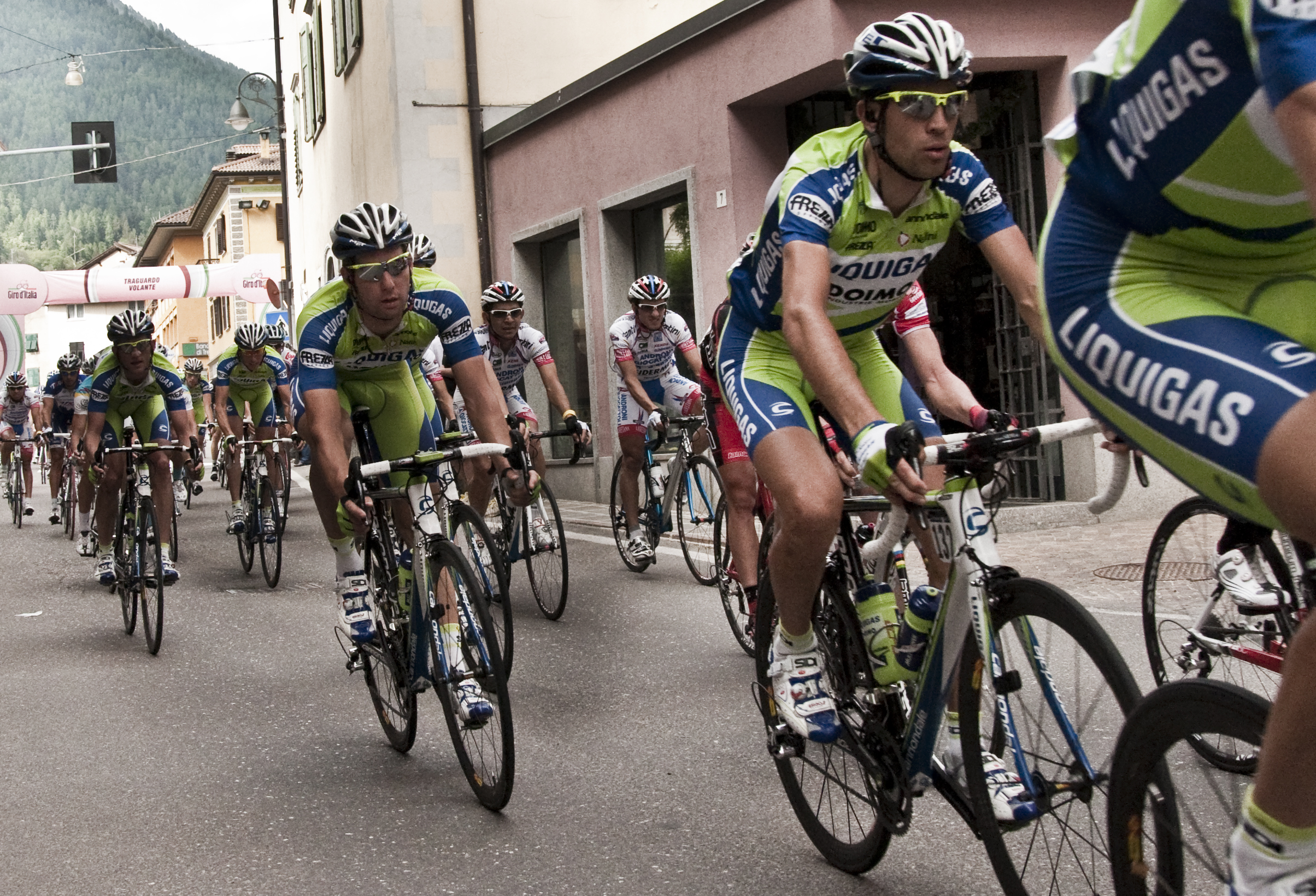
Team Liquigas–Doimo leads the peloton through Malè in Trentino.

This was described as the Giro's most controlled stage. After a morning breakaway of 19 riders took from 48 km (30 mi) into the stage, Caisse d'Epargne and Liquigas–Doimo rode a tempo at the front of the peloton to protect their general classification leaders, affording the stage win to one from the leading group.

Seventeen teams were represented in the break; Lampre–Farnese Vini and Colnago–CSF Inox each had two riders in the group. Their time gap was a little over nine minutes for almost all of the stage. Mikhail Ignatiev set off on a solo bid for victory 28 km (17 mi) from the line, but he faded quickly and finished the stage with the peloton. At 20 km (12 mi) to go, Nicki Sørensen put in an attack that broke the race open. The leaders no longer rode as a cohesive unit, and finished scattered ahead of the peloton. Sørensen's move was not destined for success, as he faded and finished the stage 11th. Daniel Moreno then rode at the front of the race for a few kilometers before the chasing group of Danilo Hondo, Steven Kruijswijk, and Damien Monier passed him up. The three of them rode together for a while before Monier took off on the Pejo Terme climb, soloing to victory half a minute ahead of Kruijswijk and Hondo. The stage win was Monier's first professional victory. It was the sprinter Hondo who climbed to second on the stage, saying afterward that he had had "good legs" despite the stage profile not favoring him. The race's overall favorites finished 9'53" back on the stage, with Michele Scarponi gaining one second on the rest of his group at the finish line. Richie Porte, Carlos Sastre, Damiano Cunego, and Robert Kišerlovski all lost a few seconds, but the composition of the top ten in the overall classification remained the same as the day before.

Stage 17 result

	Rider	Team	Time
1	Damien Monier (FRA)	Cofidis	4h 29' 19"
2	Danilo Hondo (GER)	Lampre–Farnese Vini	+ 36"
3	Steven Kruijswijk (NED)	Rabobank	+ 39"
4	Daniel Moreno (ESP)	Omega Pharma–Lotto	+ 1' 05"
5	Steve Cummings (GBR)	Team Sky	+ 1' 18"
6	Simone Stortoni (ITA)	Colnago–CSF Inox	+ 1' 48"
7	Alexander Efimkin (RUS)	Ag2r–La Mondiale	+ 1' 55"
8	Marco Marzano (ITA)	Lampre–Farnese Vini	+ 1' 57"
9	Ignatas Konovalovas (LTU)	Cervélo TestTeam	+ 2' 01"
10	Carlos José Ochoa (VEN)	Androni Giocattoli	+ 2' 07"

General classification after stage 17

	Rider	Team	Time
1	David Arroyo (ESP)	Caisse d'Epargne	73h 11' 38"
2	Ivan Basso (ITA)	Liquigas–Doimo	+ 2' 27"
3	Richie Porte (AUS)	Team Saxo Bank	+ 2' 44"
4	Cadel Evans (AUS)	BMC Racing Team	+ 3' 09"
5	Carlos Sastre (ESP)	Cervélo TestTeam	+ 4' 41"
6	Vincenzo Nibali (ITA)	Liquigas–Doimo	+ 4' 53"
7	Alexander Vinokourov (KAZ)	Astana	+ 5' 12"
8	Michele Scarponi (ITA)	Androni Giocattoli	+ 5' 24"
9	Damiano Cunego (ITA)	Lampre–Farnese Vini	+ 9' 21"
10	Robert Kišerlovski (CRO)	Liquigas–Doimo	+ 9' 32"

== Stage 18 ==
27 May 2010 — Levico Terme to Brescia, 151 km (94 mi)

This stage was short and flat, with no categorized climbs. It headed south from Levico Terme to Brescia in Lombardy.

After missing out on the bunch finishes earlier in the Giro, Team HTC–Columbia sprinter André Greipel, the season's most prolific winner, made a point of continuing through the mountain stages earlier in the Giro's last week with victory in this stage in mind. Olivier Kaisen and Alan Marangoni were the day's principal breakaway, but Team HTC–Columbia rode a tempo at the front of the peloton that kept them from getting any more than three minutes' advantage. They timed the catch ideally, reeling in Kaisen with 3 km (1.9 mi) remaining in the stage and Marangoni a kilometer later. Marcel Sieberg and František Raboň rode on either side of Greipel to keep him protected and keep any other sprinter from holding his wheel. Greipel accelerated inside the final few hundred meters of the stage and took the victory ahead of Julian Dean and Tiziano Dall'Antonia. There was no change to the overall standings with the day's results.

Stage 18 result

	Rider	Team	Time
1	André Greipel (GER)	Team HTC–Columbia	3h 14' 59"
2	Julian Dean (NZL)	Garmin–Transitions	s.t.
3	Tiziano Dall'Antonia (ITA)	Liquigas–Doimo	s.t.
4	Greg Henderson (NZL)	Team Sky	s.t.
5	Danilo Hondo (GER)	Lampre–Farnese Vini	s.t.
6	Graeme Brown (AUS)	Rabobank	s.t.
7	Lucas Sebastián Haedo (ARG)	Team Saxo Bank	s.t.
8	Michiel Elijzen (NED)	Omega Pharma–Lotto	s.t.
9	Fabio Sabatini (ITA)	Liquigas–Doimo	s.t.
10	William Bonnet (FRA)	Bbox Bouygues Telecom	s.t.

General classification after stage 18

	Rider	Team	Time
1	David Arroyo (ESP)	Caisse d'Epargne	76h 26' 37"
2	Ivan Basso (ITA)	Liquigas–Doimo	+ 2' 27"
3	Richie Porte (AUS)	Team Saxo Bank	+ 2' 44"
4	Cadel Evans (AUS)	BMC Racing Team	+ 3' 09"
5	Carlos Sastre (ESP)	Cervélo TestTeam	+ 4' 41"
6	Vincenzo Nibali (ITA)	Liquigas–Doimo	+ 4' 53"
7	Alexander Vinokourov (KAZ)	Astana	+ 5' 12"
8	Michele Scarponi (ITA)	Androni Giocattoli	+ 5' 24"
9	Damiano Cunego (ITA)	Lampre–Farnese Vini	+ 9' 21"
10	Robert Kišerlovski (CRO)	Liquigas–Doimo	+ 9' 32"

== Stage 19 ==
28 May 2010 — Brescia to Aprica, 195 km (121 mi)

This stage contained four categorized climbs, visiting the summit finish in Aprica once before the actual conclusion of the stage. 32 km (20 mi) from the finish of the stage was the Passo del Mortirolo, which was only marginally less steep than the Zoncolan, and was 2.7 km (1.7 mi) longer. After the descent from the Mortirolo, a 15 km (9.3 mi) long ramp back to Aprica was the finish.

The first few kilometers of this stage were flat, and during this time the peloton stayed together. After an hour of racing, nine riders – Jan Bakelants, Francesco Faili, Branislau Samoilau, Luca Mazzanti, Yuriy Krivtsov, Jackson Rodríguez, William Bonnet, Xavier Tondó, and Leonardo Duque – established a gap over the main field. They had an advantage of 8'27" at the stage's feed zone. It was at this point that the day's climbing began, with the first visit to Aprica. On this climb, Stefano Garzelli attacked out of the peloton and came clear, bridging up to his teammate Faili who had intentionally fallen off the pace of the leaders to work for Garzelli. In the peloton, the Liquigas–Doimo team of Ivan Basso and Vincenzo Nibali, one of the few squads that still had all nine riders, was riding a very hard tempo to try to isolate the competition while protecting their leaders. Through the first ascent of Aprica and the first-category Trivigno climb, this was how the race was, with the remnants of the morning breakaway out in the front of the race, Garzelli about a minute behind, and then the rapidly depleting group of overall favorites behind him.

Damiano Cunego was the first overall contender dropped by Liquigas–Doimo's pace, as Sylwester Szmyd drove the group up the Mortirolo. In short order, everyone from the morning breakaway was reabsorbed, leaving only Garzelli out front. As one by one Liquigas–Doimo's support riders rode increasingly harder and harder paces before bonking and falling off, many overall contenders followed Cunego out the back of what had been the pink jersey group. Carlos Sastre was the next to lose contact, followed by Alexander Vinokourov. Cadel Evans fell off numerous times and fought back before being dropped for good near the summit. Race leader David Arroyo rode the climb behind Evans and was immediately at risk of losing the pink jersey, as the lead group contained only Basso, Nibali, and Michele Scarponi, who crested the Mortirolo more than two minutes ahead of him.

Basso rode a conservative descent of the Mortirolo, and Nibali and Scarponi had to wait for him several times. Arroyo, a rider recognized as a skilled descender, rode very aggressively, catching and passing Sastre and John Gadret, then Evans, then Vinokourov and came within 30 seconds of reaching the leading Italian trio. Garzelli, for his part, had also ridden an aggressive descent of the Mortirolo, but he crashed and would abandon the race the next day due to his injuries.

Facing the second ascent of Aprica, which was also the stage finish, Basso, Nibali, and Scarponi held an advantage of under a minute over Arroyo, Sastre, Gadret, Vinokourov, and Evans, who had come together into a single chase group. Although the Aprica was a much easier climb than the Mortirolo, the leading trio put time into the Arroyo group for the entirety of the climb. Basso and Nibali, being teammates, worked together to drive the group to get as big a time gap as possible to put Basso in the pink jersey and potentially Nibali onto the Giro's podium. Scarponi did very little work in the group, and as such was the freshest in the sprint for the stage win. Nibali allowed Basso second place to get him the bigger time bonus. With 2'27" in hand to Basso coming into the day, and a 12-second bonus already lost, Arroyo had to finish the stage no more than 2'15" slower than the stage winner to keep the pink jersey. The Arroyo group was not nearly as fresh as the leaders during the climb and did not come close to that time, finishing over three minutes back. Basso took the pink jersey for the first time since winning the race overall in 2006, but noted after the stage that while the team had worked well on this day, there was another very difficult day ahead of them before the time trial in Verona.

Stage 19 result

	Rider	Team	Time
1	Michele Scarponi (ITA)	Androni Giocattoli	5h 27' 04"
2	Ivan Basso (ITA)	Liquigas–Doimo	s.t.
3	Vincenzo Nibali (ITA)	Liquigas–Doimo	s.t.
4	Alexander Vinokourov (KAZ)	Astana	+ 3' 05"
5	John Gadret (FRA)	Ag2r–La Mondiale	+ 3' 05"
6	Cadel Evans (AUS)	BMC Racing Team	+ 3' 06"
7	David Arroyo (ESP)	Caisse d'Epargne	+ 3' 06"
8	Carlos Sastre (ESP)	Cervélo TestTeam	+ 3' 06"
9	Branislau Samoilau (BLR)	Quick-Step	+ 5' 27"
10	Marco Pinotti (ITA)	Team HTC–Columbia	+ 5' 27"

General classification after stage 19

	Rider	Team	Time
1	Ivan Basso (ITA)	Liquigas–Doimo	81h 55' 56"
2	David Arroyo (ESP)	Caisse d'Epargne	+ 51"
3	Vincenzo Nibali (ITA)	Liquigas–Doimo	+ 2' 30"
4	Michele Scarponi (ITA)	Androni Giocattoli	+ 2' 49"
5	Cadel Evans (AUS)	BMC Racing Team	+ 4' 00"
6	Carlos Sastre (ESP)	Cervélo TestTeam	+ 5' 32"
7	Richie Porte (AUS)	Team Saxo Bank	+ 6' 00"
8	Alexander Vinokourov (KAZ)	Astana	+ 6' 22"
9	Robert Kišerlovski (CRO)	Liquigas–Doimo	+ 12' 44"
10	Marco Pinotti (ITA)	Team HTC–Columbia	+ 13' 40"

== Stage 20 ==
29 May 2010 — Bormio to Passo del Tonale, 178 km (111 mi)

The Passo di Gavia, at 2,618 m (8,589 ft) in elevation, was the Cima Coppi, the highest point in the Giro. It was the penultimate climb on the course, before the finish at the Passo del Tonale. The course briefly entered Switzerland for the Forcola di Livigno climb, which features almost 2,000 m (6,600 ft) of vertical gain. This stage contained the most climbing of any in this Giro, going up 6,320 m (20,730 ft) among five mountains.

For weeks leading up to this stage, there had been speculation that the route would have to be altered due to the amount of snow that had accumulated on the Gavia. An alternative route, involving a different ascent of the Passo del Mortirolo than was used in stage 19, was proposed. It was ultimately deemed unnecessary to alter the route, as the roads on the Gavia were cleared and there was no snowfall the day the stage was run. The roads were lined with banks of piled up snow as the riders contested the stage.

Several inconsequential breakaway attempts occurred in the first two hours of racing, with no group getting more than about a minute on the pink jersey group at any time. Finally, over the Passo di Eira and the Passo di Foscagno, the day's second and third of five climbs, Johan Tschopp and Gilberto Simoni established themselves as the day's signature breakaway. Carlos Sastre and Alexander Vinokourov were in a chase group between the leading duo and the pink jersey group. Much as they had in the previous day, Liquigas–Doimo rode a hard tempo that effectively isolated members of the other teams while protecting race leader Ivan Basso and squad co-captain Vincenzo Nibali. Sastre and Vinokourov's group was not ahead of the race leader for long, and they were brought back during the ascent of the Gavia.

In the front of the race, Tschopp and Simoni approached the summit of the Gavia together. Tschopp easily outkicked the veteran Italian to claim the prize that went along with winning the Cima Coppi, and Simoni never caught back up to him, finishing 6'50" back on the stage, in 32nd. The pink jersey group was next to the summit. Once over the top, previous race leader David Arroyo faced the decision of whether to ride a hard descent as he had on the Mortirolo the day before. He stayed with Basso for the descent, seemingly content to keep his second place in the overall standings.

As the Giro was the final event of Simoni's career and this was the Giro's final road race stage, Simoni was approached by a journalist on a motorbike for an interview as he climbed the Passo del Tonale. Tschopp rode the Tonale alone and stayed out front to the conclusion of the race, getting the first Giro stage win for a Swiss rider since Alex Zülle in 1998.

The pink jersey group ascended the Tonale just behind Tschopp. Michele Scarponi put in an attack about a kilometer from the finish of the stage that succeeded in getting him, Basso, and Cadel Evans clear while leaving Nibali, Vinokourov, Arroyo, and others behind. A few hundred meters from the finish, Evans put in a finishing kick that gained him a further 9 seconds over the other two. The day's results put Scarponi a single second behind Nibali for the podium, but with Nibali recognized as the far superior time trialist of the two, there stood to be little changed by the Verona time trial that closed out the race.

Stage 20 result

	Rider	Team	Time
1	Johann Tschopp (SUI)	Bbox Bouygues Telecom	5h 26' 47"
2	Cadel Evans (AUS)	BMC Racing Team	+ 16"
3	Ivan Basso (ITA)	Liquigas–Doimo	+ 25"
4	Michele Scarponi (ITA)	Androni Giocattoli	+ 25"
5	David Arroyo (ESP)	Caisse d'Epargne	+ 41"
6	Vincenzo Nibali (ITA)	Liquigas–Doimo	+ 43"
7	John Gadret (FRA)	Ag2r–La Mondiale	+ 48"
8	Bauke Mollema (NED)	Rabobank	+ 50"
9	Daniele Righi (ITA)	Lampre–Farnese Vini	+ 57"
10	Vasil Kiryienka (BLR)	Caisse d'Epargne	+ 1' 02"

General classification after stage 20

	Rider	Team	Time
1	Ivan Basso (ITA)	Liquigas–Doimo	87h 23' 00"
2	David Arroyo (ESP)	Caisse d'Epargne	+ 1' 15"
3	Vincenzo Nibali (ITA)	Liquigas–Doimo	+ 2' 56"
4	Michele Scarponi (ITA)	Androni Giocattoli	+ 2' 57"
5	Cadel Evans (AUS)	BMC Racing Team	+ 3' 47"
6	Richie Porte (AUS)	Team Saxo Bank	+ 7' 25"
7	Alexander Vinokourov (KAZ)	Astana	+ 7' 31"
8	Carlos Sastre (ESP)	Cervélo TestTeam	+ 8' 55"
9	Robert Kišerlovski (CRO)	Liquigas–Doimo	+ 14' 06"
10	Marco Pinotti (ITA)	Team HTC–Columbia	+ 15' 00"

== Stage 21 ==
30 May 2010 — Verona, 15.3 km (9.5 mi) (individual time trial)

For the third consecutive year, the Giro concluded with an individual time trial. There were several sharp turns in the course and a categorized climb in the middle of it. The finish line was just outside the Arena di Verona. After crossing it, the riders rode into the stadium where a very large crowd had assembled to see the final podium presentations.

Much as it had in the time trial which closed out the 2009 Giro, the winning time came relatively early in this stage. Team Saxo Bank's Gustav Larsson stopped the clock in 20'19" as the 80th man to the leave the starthouse, out of the 139 riders who finished the Giro. He was confident in his time, and was worried about only two rivals among the nearly 60 riders who were to follow him – stage one winner Bradley Wiggins and Italian national time trial champion Marco Pinotti. Wiggins was 12 seconds off Larsson's pace at the intermediate time check, which Larsson took to mean he could not beat his time at the finish line since Larsson is the better of the two in the downhills. He was nervous in watching Pinotti take the course near the end of the day, and the Italian champion posted a better time than Larsson at the intermediate time check, but he faded as the course went on and was two seconds slower than Larsson at the finish line.

Little was to be decided with regards to the overall standings. Race leader Ivan Basso and second place man David Arroyo were recognized as roughly equal against the clock, and even if Arroyo were considerably better it would be difficult to make up 1'15" in such a short course. Michele Scarponi trailed Vincenzo Nibali by a single second for the last step on the podium, but was a poorer time trialist and did not make up the deficit. Arroyo and Scarponi both conceded time, but remained in their previous overall positions of second and fourth, respectively. Giro champion Basso was 15th on the day, 42 seconds back of Larsson. He named this Giro win as much sweeter than his first, in 2006, as he had to fight for it in the race's difficult final week after sustaining a crash in Tuscany and mistakenly ceding a great deal of time to Arroyo in L'Aquila. The Liquigas–Doimo team proved dominant in the race's final results, having Basso and Nibali on the podium and winning both the Trofeo Fast Team and Trofeo Super Team classifications. The other jersey awards were all won by Australian riders – Cadel Evans won the points classification, Matthew Lloyd the mountains classification, and Richie Porte the youth classification.

Stage 21 result

	Rider	Team	Time
1	Gustav Larsson (SWE)	Team Saxo Bank	20' 19"
2	Marco Pinotti (ITA)	Team HTC–Columbia	+ 2"
3	Alexander Vinokourov (KAZ)	Astana	+ 17"
4	Cadel Evans (AUS)	BMC Racing Team	+ 22"
5	Vincenzo Nibali (ITA)	Liquigas–Doimo	+ 23"
6	Ignatas Konovalovas (LTU)	Cervélo TestTeam	+ 23"
7	Bradley Wiggins (GBR)	Team Sky	+ 29"
8	Cameron Meyer (AUS)	Garmin–Transitions	+ 32"
9	Michele Scarponi (ITA)	Androni Giocattoli	+ 35"
10	Tom Stamsnijder (NED)	Rabobank	+ 37"

Final general classification

	Rider	Team	Time
1	Ivan Basso (ITA)	Liquigas–Doimo	87h 44' 01"
2	David Arroyo (ESP)	Caisse d'Epargne	+ 1' 51"
3	Vincenzo Nibali (ITA)	Liquigas–Doimo	+ 2' 37"
4	Michele Scarponi (ITA)	Androni Giocattoli	+ 2' 50"
5	Cadel Evans (AUS)	BMC Racing Team	+ 3' 27"
6	Alexander Vinokourov (KAZ)	Astana	+ 7' 06"
7	Richie Porte (AUS)	Team Saxo Bank	+ 7' 22"
8	Carlos Sastre (ESP)	Cervélo TestTeam	+ 9' 39"
9	Marco Pinotti (ITA)	Team HTC–Columbia	+ 14' 20"
10	Robert Kišerlovski (CRO)	Liquigas–Doimo	+ 14' 51"
