= 2010 Giro d'Italia, Stage 1 to Stage 11 =

Cycling race stages

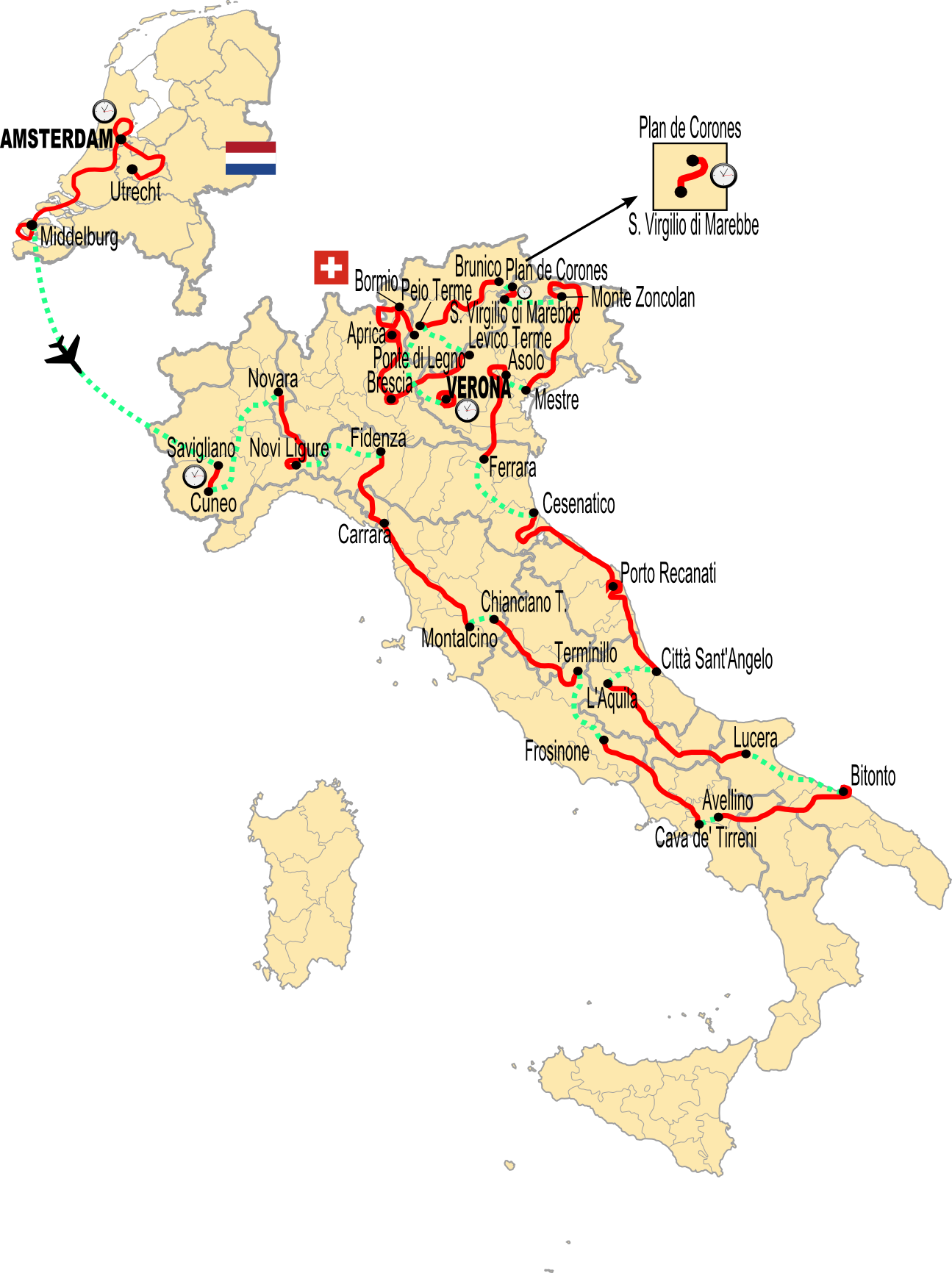
Overview of the stages; red lines represent distances covered in the individual stages, while green lines are the distances between the stages

The 2010 Giro d'Italia began on 8 May, and stage 11 occurred on 19 May. The race began in Amsterdam in the Netherlands with an individual time trial and two flat stages before transferring to Italy. The transfer made an uncommonly early rest day in a Grand Tour, coming just three days into the three-week race. Many crashes occurred in the stages in the Netherlands, leading to some unexpected big time gaps before the transfer to Italy. Three different riders led the race after the three days in the Netherlands.

The first stage in Italy was a team time trial, the fifth successive year the discipline has featured in the Giro. This stage transferred the race lead to a fourth rider in as many stages, Vincenzo Nibali. Though many of the stages in the first half of the Giro were flat or undulating, and theoretically fairly straightforward, there were repeated large time gaps from day to day. The first mountain stage was stage 8, which concluded with a long climb to Monte Terminillo.

Stage 11 was the longest in the race, and featured another surprise, a 50-strong breakaway which greatly shook up the overall standings before the more mountainous second half of the Giro. Alexander Vinokourov had held the race lead prior to that stage, but lost it to Richie Porte, who figured into the winning break.

Legend
A pink jersey	Denotes the leader of the General classification	A green jersey	Denotes the leader of the Mountains classification
A red jersey	Denotes the leader of the Points classification	A white jersey	Denotes the leader of the Young rider classification
	s.t. indicates that the rider crossed the finish line in the same group as the one receiving the time above him, and was therefore credited with the same finishing time.		

== Stage 1 ==
8 May 2010 — Amsterdam (Netherlands), 8.4 km (5.2 mi) (individual time trial)

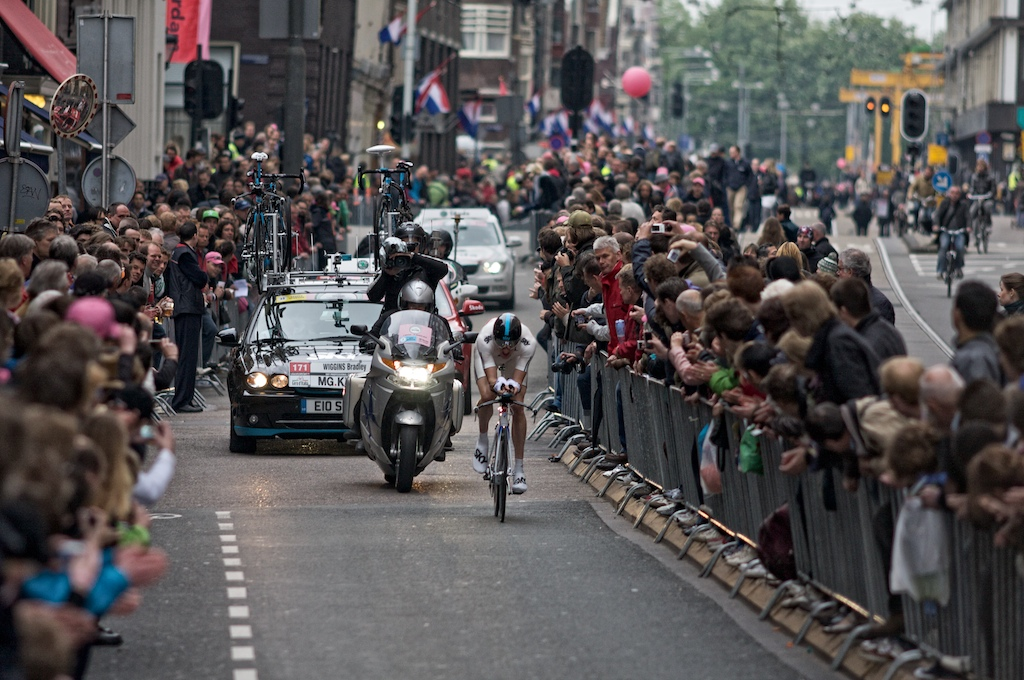
Bradley Wiggins riding the time trial

The Giro opened with a short, flat time trial in Amsterdam, the ninth time that the Giro has begun outside Italy. There were a number of tight turns in the course, which began at the Museumplein and ended at the Olympic Stadium, making for a stage that favored time trial specialists.

Intermittent rain made the time trial difficult for various riders throughout the day. Astana's Andriy Hryvko, the five-time defending Ukrainian national time trial champion, set the first real time to beat early on the day, clocking in at 10'31". Hryvko was the 14th man to leave the starthouse, and his time held up until the 60th man, Team Saxo Bank's Gustav Larsson, time trial silver medalist from the most recent world championships and Olympics, was six seconds better at 10'25".

An hour and a half later, the day's biggest surprise came when Brent Bookwalter from Cadel Evans' BMC Racing Team, riding in his first Grand Tour, put up 10'20" as the day's new best time. The only man to do better on the day was Team Sky captain and time trial specialist Bradley Wiggins, stopping the clock in 10'18" to earn the first pink jersey. Of the Giro's overall favorites, Evans finished best-placed, on the same time as Bookwalter for third place.

Stage 1 result and general classification after stage 1

	Rider	Team	Time
1	Bradley Wiggins (GBR)	Team Sky	10' 18"
2	Brent Bookwalter (USA)	BMC Racing Team	+ 2"
3	Cadel Evans (AUS)	BMC Racing Team	+ 2"
4	Alexander Vinokourov (KAZ)	Astana	+ 5"
5	Greg Henderson (NZL)	Team Sky	+ 5"
6	Richie Porte (AUS)	Team Saxo Bank	+ 5"
7	David Millar (GBR)	Garmin–Transitions	+ 6"
8	Gustav Larsson (SWE)	Team Saxo Bank	+ 7"
9	Jos van Emden (NED)	Rabobank	+ 9"
10	Marco Pinotti (ITA)	Team HTC–Columbia	+ 9"

== Stage 2 ==
9 May 2010 — Amsterdam (Netherlands) to Utrecht (Netherlands), 209 km (130 mi)

The first road race of the 2010 Giro was flat, starting in Amsterdam and ending in Utrecht. Two very small climbs occurred shortly before the midpoint of the stage, to decide the first wearer of the green jersey. The roads leading into the finish in Utrecht twist and turn repeatedly.

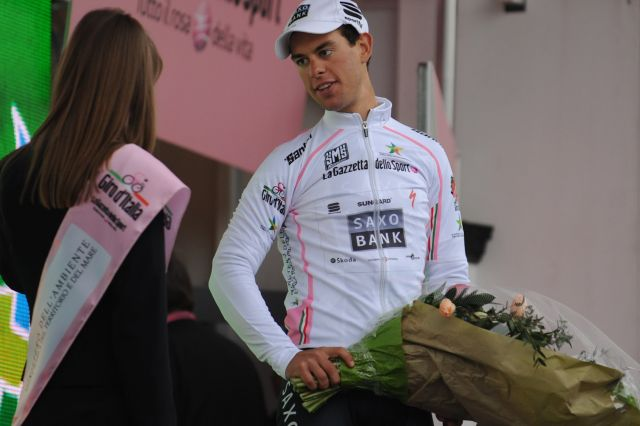
Richie Porte in the white jersey as best young rider.

There were a large number of crashes during the stage, which commentators and team managers alike described as unprecedented. The course was noted to have a lot of street furniture on it, which compounded with riders' nerves as the number of crashes mounted higher and higher to make the day of racing more perilous.

The day's breakaway numbered four – Paul Voss, Rick Flens, Stefano Pirazzi, and Mauro Facci. Team Sky, at the head of the peloton, allowed them a little over 5 minutes' advantage before they set to making the chase. One of the day's massive crashes occurred with 40 km (25 mi) for the peloton, bringing down around 30 riders, including race leader Bradley Wiggins. Around this time, Flens tried to solo from the leading group, but the peloton caught him with 24 km (15 mi) left to race. Another huge crash took place 7.2 km (4.5 mi) from the finish line, depleting the leading group to only 58 riders and leaving Wiggins and Carlos Sastre, among others, 37 seconds back at the finish. The stage ended in a sprint finish, as expected, which was won by Tyler Farrar. Cadel Evans took over the leaders jersey.

Stage 2 result

	Rider	Team	Time
1	Tyler Farrar (USA)	Garmin–Transitions	4h 56' 46"
2	Matthew Goss (AUS)	Team HTC–Columbia	s.t.
3	Fabio Sabatini (ITA)	Liquigas–Doimo	s.t.
4	André Greipel (GER)	Team HTC–Columbia	s.t.
5	Alessandro Petacchi (ITA)	Lampre–Farnese Vini	s.t.
6	Chris Sutton (AUS)	Team Sky	s.t.
7	Robbie McEwen (AUS)	Team Katusha	s.t.
8	Graeme Brown (AUS)	Rabobank	s.t.
9	Julian Dean (NZL)	Garmin–Transitions	s.t.
10	Sacha Modolo (ITA)	Colnago-CSF Inox	s.t.

General classification after stage 2

	Rider	Team	Time
1	Cadel Evans (AUS)	BMC Racing Team	5h 07' 09"
2	Tyler Farrar (USA)	Garmin–Transitions	+ 1"
3	Alexander Vinokourov (KAZ)	Astana	+ 3"
4	Richie Porte (AUS)	Team Saxo Bank	+ 3"
5	David Millar (GBR)	Garmin–Transitions	+ 4"
6	Jos van Emden (NED)	Rabobank	+ 7"
7	Vincenzo Nibali (ITA)	Liquigas–Doimo	+ 8"
8	Tom Stamsnijder (NED)	Rabobank	+ 9"
9	Marcel Sieberg (GER)	Team HTC–Columbia	+ 10"
10	Matthew Goss (AUS)	Team HTC–Columbia	+ 13"

== Stage 3 ==
10 May 2010 — Amsterdam (Netherlands) to Middelburg (Netherlands), 224 km (139 mi)

Starting again from Amsterdam, stage 3 included portions dipping below sea level. The route headed south from Amsterdam along the North Sea, crossing through the islands of Zeeland before ending in Middelburg on Walcheren.

Crosswinds blowing from the coast fractured the peloton early on. The day's breakaway, comprising Olivier Kaisen, Jérôme Pineau, and Tom Stamsnijder was caught well before the end of the stage. It appeared for much of the day that Damiano Cunego would lose over a minute to the race's overall favorites after he missed a selection early on and rode much of the stage behind them. His group also contained André Greipel and Greg Henderson, however, and their teams made an effective chase to catch back up to race leader Cadel Evans' group.

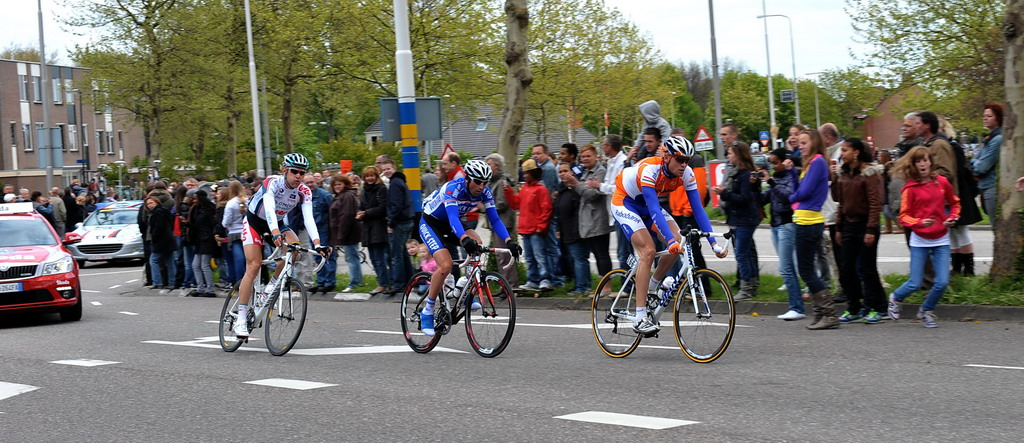
Kaisen, Pineau, and Stamsnijder, the day's breakaway.

With 30 km (19 mi) left to race, a major crash occurred, taking down most of Team Sky, including Henderson and former race leader Bradley Wiggins. The crash also brought down Christian Vande Velde, who was forced to retire. It made for a crucial selection, as 29 riders at the head of the peloton were able to avoid it and finished 46 seconds better than Evans' group. Greipel was present in the leading group for the sprint finish, but he was unable to respond to the sprint kick from Quick-Step's Wouter Weylandt, who easily took the stage win. The best-placed rider in the general classification in the leading group was Alexander Vinokourov, who became the third rider in as many days to pull on the pink jersey.

Despite the course's extremely flat profile, large time gaps resulted from the stage. Alessandro Petacchi and darkhorse overall contender Domenico Pozzovivo missed an early selection and never recovered, finishing eight minutes back along with riders like Marzio Bruseghin, Filippo Pozzato, and Gilberto Simoni. Five Team Sky riders including Wiggins lost four minutes, and the last group on the road lost nearly 15 minutes.

Stage 3 result

	Rider	Team	Time
1	Wouter Weylandt (BEL)	Quick-Step	5h 00' 06"
2	Graeme Brown (AUS)	Rabobank	s.t.
3	Robert Förster (GER)	Team Milram	s.t.
4	Danilo Hondo (GER)	Lampre–Farnese Vini	s.t.
5	Adam Blythe (GBR)	Omega Pharma–Lotto	s.t.
6	André Greipel (GER)	Team HTC–Columbia	s.t.
7	Linus Gerdemann (GER)	Team Milram	s.t.
8	Vincenzo Nibali (ITA)	Liquigas–Doimo	s.t.
9	Thomas Rohregger (AUT)	Team Milram	s.t.
10	Alexander Vinokourov (KAZ)	Astana	s.t.

General classification after stage 3

	Rider	Team	Time
1	Alexander Vinokourov (KAZ)	Astana	10h 07' 18"
2	Richie Porte (AUS)	Team Saxo Bank	+ 0"
3	David Millar (GBR)	Garmin–Transitions	+ 1"
4	Vincenzo Nibali (ITA)	Liquigas–Doimo	+ 5"
5	Marcel Sieberg (GER)	Team HTC–Columbia	+ 7"
6	Matthew Goss (AUS)	Team HTC–Columbia	+ 10"
7	André Greipel (GER)	Team HTC–Columbia	+ 10"
8	Linus Gerdemann (GER)	Team Milram	+ 12"
9	Stefano Garzelli (ITA)	Acqua & Sapone	+ 15"
10	Pieter Weening (NED)	Rabobank	+ 16"

== Stage 4 ==
12 May 2010 — Savigliano to Cuneo, 32.5 km (20.2 mi) (team time trial)

After the transfer to Italy, which took the riders to Savigliano in the Piedmont, the first stage on Italian soil was, as it had been since 2006, a team time trial. The route was on a slight uphill for its duration, which was atypical for a team time trial. The course headed south on mainly straight roads from Savigliano to Cuneo, with intermediate time checks in Genola and Centallo.

The fourth team to leave the starthouse, Cadel Evans' BMC Racing Team, set the early time to beat, bettering the teams before them by nearly a minute. Their time of 37'58" stood for close to an hour, with the teams that followed them failing to beat provisional second place team Footon–Servetto–Fuji's time of 38'40". The first team faster than BMC was Team Katusha, with Mikhail Ignatiev pulling his teammates to a time of 37'04", eventually fourth at the end of the day. Stage favorites Team Sky took the course just after the Russian team and brought five riders home in 36'50" to take over the top spot. After Omega Pharma–Lotto and Cervélo TestTeam both turned in solid rides, at 37'23" and 37'15" respectively, another favorite in Garmin–Transitions was next on the road. The team rode without one of its captains, Christian Vande Velde, who had been forced to retire from the Giro in the last stage in the Netherlands after crashing. His remaining teammates had wanted to dedicate their prospective victory to him, but Vandevelde's presence proved sorely missed as the team managed only 37'26" and eighth on the day.

The last four teams to start were Liquigas–Doimo, Team HTC–Columbia, Team Saxo Bank, and Astana, with the pink jersey hanging in the balance as the four teams had riders tightly bunched in the overall standings from the previous stage. Liquigas-Doimo had all nine riders together as they entered Cuneo, while other teams lost riders early and often in the stage. Six crossed the finish line together in 36'37", supplanting Team Sky for best on the day. Team HTC-Columbia and Team Saxo Bank both failed to top Liquigas-Doimo in their rides, meaning Vincenzo Nibali stood to be the fourth new race leader in a row pending current race leader Alexander Vinokourov and team Astana's ride. The Kazakh team lost Alexsandr Dyachenko, Valentin Iglinskiy, and Enrico Gasparotto early in their ride, having only six riders together for most of the stage. Roman Kireyev fell off with 3 kilometers left, and Gorazd Štangelj also lost the pace well before the finish line. Štangelj rode back to his teammates the first time he came off the back, but he lost the pace again in the final kilometer. A visibly upset Vinokourov had to sit up and wait for him, costing the team the seconds they needed to keep Vinokourov in the pink jersey. Nibali became the new race leader.

Stage 4 result

	Team	Time
1	Liquigas–Doimo	36' 37"
2	Team Sky	+ 13"
3	Team HTC–Columbia	+ 21"
4	Team Katusha	+ 27"
5	Cervélo TestTeam	+ 38"
6	Astana	+ 38"
7	Omega Pharma–Lotto	+ 46"
8	Garmin–Transitions	+ 49"
9	Team Saxo Bank	+ 50"
10	Team Milram	+ 57"

General classification after stage 4

	Rider	Team	Time
1	Vincenzo Nibali (ITA)	Liquigas–Doimo	10h 44' 00"
2	Ivan Basso (ITA)	Liquigas–Doimo	+ 13"
3	Valerio Agnoli (ITA)	Liquigas–Doimo	+ 20"
4	Matthew Goss (AUS)	Team HTC–Columbia	+ 26"
5	André Greipel (GER)	Team HTC–Columbia	+ 26"
6	Alexander Vinokourov (KAZ)	Astana	+ 33"
7	Vladimir Karpets (RUS)	Team Katusha	+ 39"
8	Richie Porte (AUS)	Team Saxo Bank	+ 45"
9	David Millar (GBR)	Garmin–Transitions	+ 45"
10	Paolo Tiralongo (ITA)	Astana	+ 59"

== Stage 5 ==
13 May 2010 — Novara to Novi Ligure, 168 km (104 mi)

After another transfer, the fifth stage was flat, entering Liguria, with two short climbs occurring about two-thirds of the way into the stage. The stage paid tribute to Fausto Coppi, passing through his hometown of Castellania and ending in Novi Ligure, where he lived later in his life. Novi Ligure was also the hometown of Costante Girardengo, also honored in this stage. The riders saw the finish line in Novi Ligure twice, taking a finishing circuit in the town.

A four-man breakaway distinguished themselves after 25 km (16 mi). The group consisted of Yukiya Arashiro, Jérôme Pineau, Julien Fouchard, and mountains classification leader Paul Voss, after a move instigated by Arashiro. Voss sat up after the second small climb on the course, having taken first-place points on both. The group's maximum time gap was four minutes, at the Passo Coppi in Castellania. Lampre–Farnese Vini set to making the chase, but for a while they were the only team chasing, meaning the time gap did not fall very fast – it was still 2'50" by the 30 km (19 mi) to go mark.

The teams of the race's other premier sprinters joined the chase in the finishing circuit in Novi Ligure. With 5 km (3.1 mi) to go, Arashiro, Pineau, and Fouchard held a tenuous lead of under one minute. The chase continued into the final kilometer, and the three managed to stay away by a margin of 4 seconds over the hard-charging sprinters at the head of the peloton. Pineau was the winner, over Fouchard in second. Reactions to the failure to catch the breakaway varied, from finger-pointing to complaints over the Giro directors' descriptions of the finishing circuit to simply crediting the leading trio for their combativity. With the win, Pineau took over the lead in the points classification, earning the red jersey for stage six. There was no significant change to the race's overall standings.

Stage 5 result

	Rider	Team	Time
1	Jérôme Pineau (FRA)	Quick-Step	3h 45' 59"
2	Julien Fouchard (FRA)	Cofidis	s.t.
3	Yukiya Arashiro (JPN)	Bbox Bouygues Telecom	s.t.
4	Tyler Farrar (USA)	Garmin–Transitions	+ 4"
5	Greg Henderson (NZL)	Team Sky	+ 4"
6	Alessandro Petacchi (ITA)	Lampre–Farnese Vini	+ 4"
7	Graeme Brown (AUS)	Rabobank	+ 4"
8	André Greipel (GER)	Team HTC–Columbia	+ 4"
9	Lucas Sebastián Haedo (ARG)	Team Saxo Bank	+ 4"
10	William Bonnet (FRA)	Bbox Bouygues Telecom	+ 4"

General classification after stage 5

	Rider	Team	Time
1	Vincenzo Nibali (ITA)	Liquigas–Doimo	14h 30' 03"
2	Ivan Basso (ITA)	Liquigas–Doimo	+ 13"
3	Valerio Agnoli (ITA)	Liquigas–Doimo	+ 20"
4	Matthew Goss (AUS)	Team HTC–Columbia	+ 26"
5	André Greipel (GER)	Team HTC–Columbia	+ 26"
6	Alexander Vinokourov (KAZ)	Astana	+ 33"
7	Vladimir Karpets (RUS)	Team Katusha	+ 39"
8	Richie Porte (AUS)	Team Saxo Bank	+ 45"
9	David Millar (GBR)	Garmin–Transitions	+ 45"
10	Paolo Tiralongo (ITA)	Astana	+ 59"

== Stage 6 ==
14 May 2010 — Fidenza to Marina di Carrara, 166 km (103 mi)

Another transfer took the riders to the Fidenza in the region of Emilia-Romagna. Stage 6 was categorized intermediate, going over the Passo del Brattello after 78 km (48 mi) and the Spolverina and the Bedizzano climbs shortly before the finish.

After 45 km (28 mi) of racing, Matthew Lloyd and Rubens Bertogliati became the day's signature break. Since they posed no threat to the overall standings, with Lloyd at 11'13" back of race leader Vincenzo Nibali the better-placed of the two, the peloton was content to allow them a big lead. Their maximum advantage was six minutes, before the ascent of the day's second climb, when a five-man chase group formed. The five cut into the leaders' advantage very quickly at first, but they were unable to make the bridge, being eventually swept back up by the peloton. On the ascent of the Bedizzano, 11 km (6.8 mi) from the finish line, Lloyd shed Bertogliati and rode the rest of the way to the stage win on his own. He was first over all three of the day's climbs, and so took the green jersey as mountains classification leader. Bertogliati was very nearly absorbed by the peloton in the stage's final kilometer, staying out in front of them by only 9 seconds to hold on to second place. Danilo Hondo led the peloton across the line and momentarily thought he had won the stage, lifting his arms as he crossed the line.

Paolo Tiralongo, who had been in tenth overall and was considered a key support rider for Alexander Vinokourov, crashed at the 76 km (47 mi) mark. He was taken off the road in an ambulance, but was not seriously hurt. Ag2r–La Mondiale squad leader Guillaume Bonnafond crashed at the same time and suffered a gash near his right eye. Both riders retired from the Giro.

Stage 6 result

	Rider	Team	Time
1	Matthew Lloyd (AUS)	Omega Pharma–Lotto	4h 24' 20"
2	Rubens Bertogliati (SUI)	Androni Giocattoli	+ 1' 06"
3	Danilo Hondo (GER)	Lampre–Farnese Vini	+ 1' 15"
4	Manuel Belletti (ITA)	Colnago–CSF Inox	+ 1' 15"
5	Filippo Pozzato (ITA)	Team Katusha	+ 1' 15"
6	William Bonnet (FRA)	Bbox Bouygues Telecom	+ 1' 15"
7	Sacha Modolo (ITA)	Colnago–CSF Inox	+ 1' 15"
8	Vasil Kiryienka (BLR)	Caisse d'Epargne	+ 1' 15"
9	Alexander Efimkin (RUS)	Ag2r–La Mondiale	+ 1' 15"
10	Baden Cooke (AUS)	Team Saxo Bank	+ 1' 15"

General classification after stage 6

	Rider	Team	Time
1	Vincenzo Nibali (ITA)	Liquigas–Doimo	18h 55' 38"
2	Ivan Basso (ITA)	Liquigas–Doimo	+ 13"
3	Valerio Agnoli (ITA)	Liquigas–Doimo	+ 20"
4	Alexander Vinokourov (KAZ)	Astana	+ 33"
5	Vladimir Karpets (RUS)	Team Katusha	+ 39"
6	Richie Porte (AUS)	Team Saxo Bank	+ 45"
7	David Millar (GBR)	Garmin–Transitions	+ 45"
8	Baden Cooke (AUS)	Team Saxo Bank	+ 1' 03"
9	Linus Gerdemann (GER)	Team Milram	+ 1' 04"
10	Laurent Didier (LUX)	Team Saxo Bank	+ 1' 13"

== Stage 7 ==
15 May 2010 — Carrara to Montalcino, 215 km (134 mi)

Stage 7 was also an intermediate stage, beginning in the same city as the last one ended. It was flat for the first 100 km (62 mi) before a jagged second half. The race entered Tuscany in this stage, visiting the Passo del Rospatoio and the Poggio Civitella before the finish. The finish came on unpaved roads that are used yearly by the Italian semi-classic Montepaschi Strade Bianche.

The beginning of the stage was ridden at a very high pace, keeping any breakaway attempts in check. After 60 km (37 mi), Nicki Sørensen and Rick Flens escaped. The flat first half of the stage let them get an advantage of over nine minutes at one point, but the hilly second half combined with the day's heavy rain took its toll on them. At the 60 km (37 mi) to go mark, a selection occurred in the pink jersey group, and those left behind were never able to regain the pace. The race's main overall contenders were in the first group, including Alexander Vinokourov, Cadel Evans, Damiano Cunego, Stefano Garzelli, and the Liquigas–Doimo duo of Ivan Basso and race leader Vincenzo Nibali. Notably left behind were riders who had previously been considered contenders, like Bradley Wiggins and Carlos Sastre, who finished the day 4'30" and 5'20" respectively back of the stage winner.

The leaders brought back Sørensen and Flens with 41 km (25 mi) remaining in the stage. The first section of unpaved dirt roads (strada bianche is Italian for "white roads," referring to such areas) took its toll on Nibali, when one of his teammates crashed and subsequently brought him down with him. Nibali needed a bike change, and by the time he got one, Evans, Vinokourov, Cunego, and others had gotten away and were a minute and a half ahead. The move had been instigated by Vinokourov, and he stood to gain the most from it being the highest placed in the overall standings. The rain continued throughout the stage and made the dirt roads muddy. The cold and wet weather combined with the poor road surface caused Vinokourov to question after the stage whether such roads should be used in a stage race at all.

Vinokourov, Cunego, and Evans finished together and contested a sprint for the stage win. Cunego went first, after a hairpin left-hand turn, but Evans had the better timing and crossed the line 2 seconds ahead of his companions. Vinokourov re-assumed the pink jersey.

Stage 7 result

	Rider	Team	Time
1	Cadel Evans (AUS)	BMC Racing Team	5h 13' 37"
2	Damiano Cunego (ITA)	Lampre–Farnese Vini	+ 2"
3	Alexander Vinokourov (KAZ)	Astana	+ 2"
4	Marco Pinotti (ITA)	Team HTC–Columbia	+ 6"
5	David Arroyo (ESP)	Caisse d'Epargne	+ 12"
6	Stefano Garzelli (ITA)	Acqua & Sapone	+ 27"
7	John Gadret (FRA)	Ag2r–La Mondiale	+ 29"
8	Michele Scarponi (ITA)	Androni Giocattoli	+ 1' 01"
9	Cayetano Sarmiento (COL)	Acqua & Sapone	+ 1' 07"
10	Jan Bakelants (BEL)	Omega Pharma–Lotto	+ 1' 10"

General classification after stage 7

	Rider	Team	Time
1	Alexander Vinokourov (KAZ)	Astana	24h 09' 42"
2	Cadel Evans (AUS)	BMC Racing Team	+ 1' 12"
3	David Millar (GBR)	Garmin–Transitions	+ 1' 29"
4	Vladimir Karpets (RUS)	Team Katusha	+ 1' 30"
5	Vincenzo Nibali (ITA)	Liquigas–Doimo	+ 1' 33"
6	Marco Pinotti (ITA)	Team HTC–Columbia	+ 1' 40"
7	Linus Gerdemann (GER)	Team Milram	+ 1' 48"
8	Ivan Basso (ITA)	Liquigas–Doimo	+ 1' 51"
9	Thomas Rohregger (AUT)	Team Milram	+ 1' 54"
10	Richie Porte (AUS)	Team Saxo Bank	+ 2' 00"

== Stage 8 ==
16 May 2010 — Chianciano to Monte Terminillo, 189 km (117 mi)

This was the Giro's first mountain stage, concluding with a climb to Monte Terminillo. Prior to the Terminillo, the course undulated roughly, visiting two other categorized climbs and other rises in elevation. The Terminillo climb took 16.1 km (10.0 mi), gaining 1,172 m (3,845 ft) of vertical elevation for an average gradient of 7.3%. The steepest stretches of the climb reach 12%.

The day began with sprint great Alessandro Petacchi and 2009 youth classification runner-up Francesco Masciarelli both abandoning the race. Petacchi had been suffering from bronchitis and had not been adequately recovering from one day to the next.

There were a few breakaway attempts before Monte Nibbio, the first categorized climb of the day, but none got away as the peloton hit the ascent of that climb together. As the summit neared, mountains classification leader Matthew Lloyd attacked and was first to the line to pad his lead in that classification. Several other riders followed him, leading to a split in the peloton. A short while later, with over 100 km (62 mi) left to race, 17 riders from 15 teams formed the day's defining breakaway. Lampre–Farnese Vini and Astana handled the pacemaking at the front of the first large group, keeping the breakaway's time advantage to under three minutes. When Acqua & Sapone and BMC Racing Team joined the chase, the gap fell precipitously.

At the front of the race, with 14 km (8.7 mi) to go, Chris Anker Sørensen tried to leave his breakaway companions and solo to victory. He was easily covered by Simone Stortoni, and the two rode the next eight kilometers together ahead of the main field. The pink jersey group had absorbed the other riders from the 17-strong break, and a few riders from the pink jersey group who did not pose overall threats were able to break free and finish ahead of them. Among them was Cervélo TestTeam's Xavier Tondó, who had stayed with his team leader Carlos Sastre on previous days but had been specifically released by Sastre to ride his own race at this point, as Sastre continued to struggle.

Though Sørensen seemed to be in physical distress for most of the final 14 km (8.7 mi), he was able to shed Stortoni rather easily with 6 km (3.7 mi) and stayed out front for the stage win. The overall standings were reshuffled somewhat, as David Millar, Linus Gerdemann, and Thomas Rohregger, who had all been in the top ten overnight, were dropped on the climb and lost time. This made for the odd result of Richie Porte and Marco Pinotti also being dropped and losing time, but actually moving up overall, since they did not lose as much time.

Stage 8 result

	Rider	Team	Time
1	Chris Anker Sørensen (DEN)	Team Saxo Bank	4h 50' 48"
2	Simone Stortoni (ITA)	Colnago–CSF Inox	+ 30"
3	Xavier Tondó (ESP)	Cervélo TestTeam	+ 36"
4	Evgeni Petrov (RUS)	Team Katusha	+ 49"
5	John Gadret (FRA)	Ag2r–La Mondiale	+ 55"
6	Damiano Cunego (ITA)	Lampre–Farnese Vini	+ 56"
7	Stefano Garzelli (ITA)	Acqua & Sapone	+ 56"
8	Alexander Vinokourov (KAZ)	Astana	+ 56"
9	Cadel Evans (AUS)	BMC Racing Team	+ 56"
10	Ivan Basso (ITA)	Liquigas–Doimo	+ 56"

General classification after stage 8

	Rider	Team	Time
1	Alexander Vinokourov (KAZ)	Astana	29h 01' 26"
2	Cadel Evans (AUS)	BMC Racing Team	+ 1' 12"
3	Vincenzo Nibali (ITA)	Liquigas–Doimo	+ 1' 33"
4	Ivan Basso (ITA)	Liquigas–Doimo	+ 1' 51"
5	Marco Pinotti (ITA)	Team HTC–Columbia	+ 2' 17"
6	Richie Porte (AUS)	Team Saxo Bank	+ 2' 26"
7	Vladimir Karpets (RUS)	Team Katusha	+ 2' 34"
8	Stefano Garzelli (ITA)	Acqua & Sapone	+ 2' 47"
9	Damiano Cunego (ITA)	Lampre–Farnese Vini	+ 3' 08"
10	Michele Scarponi (ITA)	Androni Giocattoli	+ 3' 09"

== Stage 9 ==
17 May 2010 — Frosinone to Cava de' Tirreni, 188 km (117 mi)

This stage was flat, without any climbs giving points for the mountains classification. The Giro reached its southernmost point in this stage, Cava de' Tirreni in Campania.

After 9 km (5.6 mi) had been covered, Giampaolo Cheula, Tom Stamsnijder, and Michael Barry slipped away from the peloton along with breakaway specialist Mikhail Ignatiev. Team HTC–Columbia, eager to set up their leader André Greipel for a prospective mass sprint, paced the main field for most of the stage and kept the leaders' maximum advantage at around three minutes for most of the stage. The rain on the day was heavy, leaving standing puddles that sprayed riders in the peloton in the face as their bicycles rode through it. Garmin–Transitions also came forward later in the day, and by 30 km (19 mi) to go, a split occurred in the peloton because of the pace Garmin forced in efforts to catch the break. Cadel Evans and Carlos Sastre were both initially left behind – Evans made his way back to the leading group and did not lose any time, but Sastre again lost out and led the second group across the line 1'49" back of the stage winner.

Greipel himself was nearly cracked by the pace in the stage's final kilometers. While he did finish with the leading group, he was just 19th on the day, not contesting the sprint. Race leader Alexander Vinokourov was unexpectedly the first rider to try to sprint to the finish line, hoping for one of the time bonuses available to the first three finishers. Second-place man Evans marked this move and the two were briefly away in the stage's final kilometer, but they were overhauled by the sprint trains which came up behind them. Team HTC–Columbia's Matthew Goss was trying to lead Greipel out for the sprint, but when he saw that the German was not at the front of the field with 400 m (1,300 ft) to go, he decided to race for the line himself, and won the stage.

Stage 9 result

	Rider	Team	Time
1	Matthew Goss (AUS)	Team HTC–Columbia	4h 08' 17"
2	Filippo Pozzato (ITA)	Team Katusha	s.t.
3	Tyler Farrar (USA)	Garmin–Transitions	s.t.
4	Robert Förster (GER)	Team Milram	s.t.
5	Federico Canuti (ITA)	Colnago–CSF Inox	s.t.
6	Sébastien Hinault (FRA)	Ag2r–La Mondiale	s.t.
7	Wouter Weylandt (BEL)	Quick-Step	s.t.
8	Greg Henderson (NZL)	Team Sky	s.t.
9	Jos van Emden (NED)	Rabobank	s.t.
10	Markus Eibegger (AUT)	Footon–Servetto–Fuji	s.t.

General classification after stage 9

	Rider	Team	Time
1	Alexander Vinokourov (KAZ)	Astana	33h 09' 43"
2	Cadel Evans (AUS)	BMC Racing Team	+ 1' 12"
3	Vincenzo Nibali (ITA)	Liquigas–Doimo	+ 1' 33"
4	Ivan Basso (ITA)	Liquigas–Doimo	+ 1' 51"
5	Marco Pinotti (ITA)	Team HTC–Columbia	+ 2' 17"
6	Richie Porte (AUS)	Team Saxo Bank	+ 2' 26"
7	Vladimir Karpets (RUS)	Team Katusha	+ 2' 34"
8	Stefano Garzelli (ITA)	Acqua & Sapone	+ 2' 47"
9	Damiano Cunego (ITA)	Lampre–Farnese Vini	+ 3' 08"
10	Michele Scarponi (ITA)	Androni Giocattoli	+ 3' 09"

== Stage 10 ==
18 May 2010 — Avellino to Bitonto, 220 km (140 mi)

This stage was also categorized flat, though it had a few short hills, including the categorized Valico dell'Imbandima after 94 km (58 mi). It headed east into Apulia in preparation for a northward run to the Dolomites later in the race.

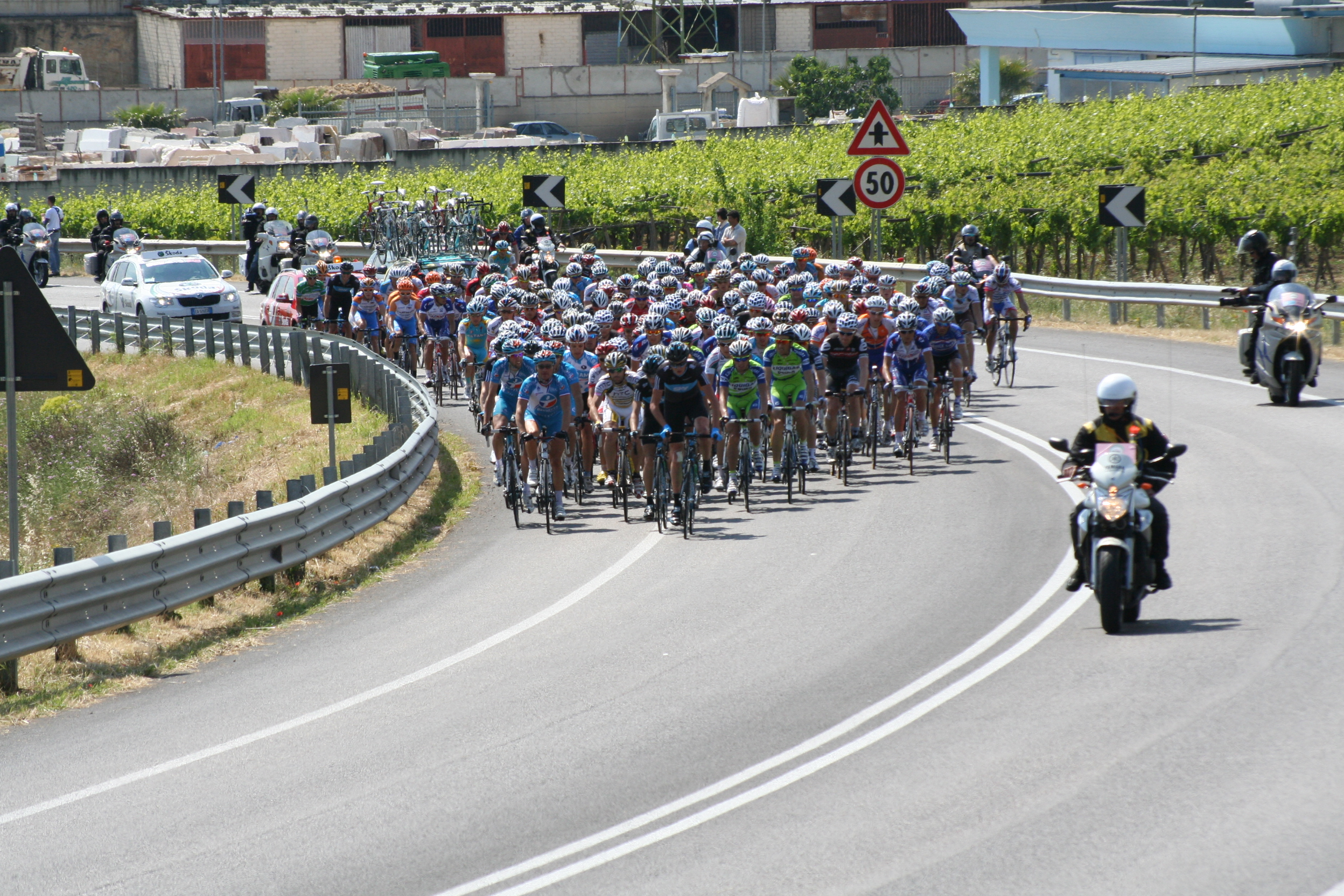
The peloton passing through Canosa di Puglia.

This was a largely straightforward day of racing. A three-rider breakaway, comprising Hubert Dupont, Charly Wegelius, and Dario Cataldo, formed early on in the stage. They attained a maximum advantage of seven minutes, as the peloton took a relaxed approach to the first few hours of racing, at last enjoying nice weather. When Team Sky and Team HTC–Columbia came forward to make the chase, the time gap fell precipitously. The roads into Bitonto were very long and straight, meaning the peloton could see the breakaway ahead of them at times when they still had a deficit of over a minute to them. With 16.7 km (10.4 mi) left to race, Dupont, Wegelius, and Cataldo were brought back. Team Sky's top sprinter Greg Henderson crashed and took several kilometers to get back to the leading group, leaving their sprint train disorganized. It fell to Garmin–Transitions and Liquigas–Doimo to organize the sprint, and their top sprinters were first on the day, with points classification leader Tyler Farrar from Garmin the victor. After the stage, Farrar praised the leadout he had received from Julian Dean, as it not only gave him the perfect acceleration on the slight uphill finish, it also split the field, as only seven other riders finished with the same time. There was no significant change to the overall standings with the day's results.

Stage 10 result

	Rider	Team	Time
1	Tyler Farrar (USA)	Garmin–Transitions	5h 49' 14"
2	Fabio Sabatini (ITA)	Liquigas–Doimo	s.t.
3	Julian Dean (NZL)	Garmin–Transitions	s.t.
4	Robbie McEwen (AUS)	Team Katusha	s.t.
5	Robert Förster (GER)	Team Milram	s.t.
6	Sébastien Hinault (FRA)	Ag2r–La Mondiale	s.t.
7	André Greipel (GER)	Team HTC–Columbia	s.t.
8	Danilo Hondo (GER)	Lampre–Farnese Vini	s.t.
9	Leonardo Duque (COL)	Cofidis	s.t.
10	Mathew Hayman (AUS)	Team Sky	+ 3"

General classification after stage 10

	Rider	Team	Time
1	Alexander Vinokourov (KAZ)	Astana	38h 59' 00"
2	Cadel Evans (AUS)	BMC Racing Team	+ 1' 12"
3	Vincenzo Nibali (ITA)	Liquigas–Doimo	+ 1' 33"
4	Ivan Basso (ITA)	Liquigas–Doimo	+ 1' 51"
5	Marco Pinotti (ITA)	Team HTC–Columbia	+ 2' 17"
6	Richie Porte (AUS)	Team Saxo Bank	+ 2' 26"
7	Vladimir Karpets (RUS)	Team Katusha	+ 2' 34"
8	Stefano Garzelli (ITA)	Acqua & Sapone	+ 2' 47"
9	Damiano Cunego (ITA)	Lampre–Farnese Vini	+ 3' 08"
10	Michele Scarponi (ITA)	Androni Giocattoli	+ 3' 09"

== Stage 11 ==
19 May 2010 — Lucera to L'Aquila, 256 km (159 mi)

This was the longest stage of the 2010 Giro. It was categorized intermediate, with a hilly profile including three categorized climbs. It was the first north-bound stage of the Giro, going to L'Aquila in the region of Abruzzo, visiting some of the area damaged by the 2009 L'Aquila earthquake.

A breakaway formed starting at the 20 km (12 mi) mark of the stage. Little by little, more and more riders came clear into the leading group. There were more than 50 riders in it at one point; the only team absent from the leading group was Astana, and most teams had three or more riders present. This group took a maximum advantage on the pink jersey of over 20 minutes. The overall favorites left in the pink jersey group either didn't know who was in the leading group or miscalculated how much advantage to give them, because sixth-place man and best young rider Richie Porte was among those in the escape, as were squad leaders Carlos Sastre and Bradley Wiggins, who had fallen out of contention days before but now suddenly stood to be right back in it.

The leading group worked cohesively for much of the stage. Cervélo TestTeam, Caisse d'Epargne, Team Sky, and Team Saxo Bank rode a hard tempo in the group since they stood to have riders high-placed in the overall standings should they gain significant time on the day. Some riders, in particular teammates of Stefano Garzelli, Michele Scarponi and Cadel Evans, were called back to the pink jersey group to try to help make the pace. Astana and BMC Racing Team were both decimated by riders abandoning the race at this point, as only five riders remained for both squads at the end of the day. This made it difficult for them to organize the chase effort. For a while, Astana, Acqua & Sapone, BMC Racing Team, and Liquigas–Doimo all mounted a coordinated chase, and the time gap to the leaders fell from 20 minutes to 13 by the summit of the Capo di Valle, the day's last climb. While this was still ample time to allow the stage winner to come from the front group, it figured to be whittled down to 7 or 8 minutes by the finish since the remaining terrain in the stage was mostly flat. However, right at the summit of the climb, Liquigas–Doimo stopped sending riders to the front of the pink jersey group, essentially giving up on the chase. This caused the other three teams to abandon the chase as well, and the time gap stayed right at 13 minutes to the end of the stage.

The leading group fragmented a little as riders attacked for the stage win. Team Katusha's Evgeni Petrov secured his first victory in seven years with a well-timed attack in the stage's final kilometer. He came home 5 seconds ahead of Dario Cataldo and Sastre, and 7 seconds over a group of other riders from the break. Forty riders finished scattered ahead of the pink jersey group. Scarponi, Garzelli, Vincenzo Nibali, and Damiano Cunego gained three seconds against overnight race leader Alexander Vinokourov, but they all lost the better part of 13 minutes to the leading group, and all fell from the top ten in the overall standings. Porte became the new race leader, adding the pink jersey to the white he had previously been holding.

Astana and Liquigas–Doimo blamed each other for the pink jersey group's errors on the day. Vinokourov felt that since his team was depleted and that Nibali and Ivan Basso stood a better chance to win the Giro than he did anyway that Liquigas–Doimo should have taken up the chase. The Italian team, for their part, felt that since Astana had held the pink jersey at the time that it was on them to organize the chase.

A 51-rider group, including most of the Giro's remaining sprinters, finished 46'31" back on the day. This put them at risk of being removed from the race, since they were outside the time limit based on the stage winner's time. Race organizers chose not to eliminate such a large group of riders, but they assessed each of them a 25-point penalty in the points classification. This affected Tyler Farrar, who had a 32-point lead in the classification reduced to just seven, opening up the competition.

Stage 11 result

	Rider	Team	Time
1	Evgeni Petrov (RUS)	Team Katusha	6h 28' 29"
2	Dario Cataldo (ITA)	Quick-Step	+ 5"
3	Carlos Sastre (ESP)	Cervélo TestTeam	+ 5"
4	Bradley Wiggins (GBR)	Team Sky	+ 7"
5	Alexander Efimkin (RUS)	Ag2r–La Mondiale	+ 7"
6	Linus Gerdemann (GER)	Team Milram	+ 7"
7	Jérôme Pineau (FRA)	Quick-Step	+ 7"
8	David Arroyo (ESP)	Caisse d'Epargne	+ 7"
9	Xavier Tondó (ESP)	Cervélo TestTeam	+ 7"
10	Jan Bakelants (BEL)	Omega Pharma–Lotto	+ 7"

General classification after stage 11

	Rider	Team	Time
1	Richie Porte (AUS)	Team Saxo Bank	45h 30' 16"
2	David Arroyo (ESP)	Caisse d'Epargne	+ 1' 42"
3	Robert Kišerlovski (CRO)	Liquigas–Doimo	+ 1' 56"
4	Xavier Tondó (ESP)	Cervélo TestTeam	+ 3' 54"
5	Valerio Agnoli (ITA)	Liquigas–Doimo	+ 4' 41"
6	Alexander Efimkin (RUS)	Ag2r–La Mondiale	+ 5' 16"
7	Linus Gerdemann (GER)	Team Milram	+ 5' 34"
8	Carlos Sastre (ESP)	Cervélo TestTeam	+ 7' 09"
9	Laurent Didier (LUX)	Team Saxo Bank	+ 7' 24"
10	Bradley Wiggins (GBR)	Team Sky	+ 8' 14"
