= Efimkin =

Efimkin is a surname. Notable people with the surname include:

- Alexander Efimkin (born 1981), Russian cyclist, twin brother of Vladimir
- Vladimir Efimkin (born 1981), Russian cyclist, twin brother of Alexander
