= 2006 Tour du Haut Var =

Race details
- Dates: 18 February 2006
- Stages: 1
- Distance: 181 km (112.5 mi)
- Winning time: 4h 54' 21"

Results
	Winner	Leonardo Bertagnolli (ITA)
	Second	Pietro Caucchioli (ITA)
	Third	Jurgen Van de Walle (BEL)

The 2006 Tour du Haut Var was the 38th edition of the Tour du Haut Var cycle race and was held on 18 February 2006. The race started and finished in Draguignan. The race was won by Leonardo Bertagnolli.

== General classification ==
Final general classification

Rank	Rider	Time
1	Leonardo Bertagnolli (ITA)	4h 54' 21"
2	Pietro Caucchioli (ITA)	+ 9"
3	Jurgen Van de Walle (BEL)	+ 9"
4	Nick Nuyens (BEL)	+ 56"
5	Bert De Waele (BEL)	+ 56"
6	Dmitry Fofonov (KAZ)	+ 56"
7	Freddy Bichot (FRA)	+ 56"
8	Bram Tankink (NED)	+ 58"
9	Francesco Failli (ITA)	+ 1' 17"
10	Joost Posthuma (NED)	+ 1' 17"
