= Kuybyshev, Russia =

Kuybyshev (Russian: Куйбышев) is the name of several inhabited localities in Russia.

== Modern localities ==
Urban localities

- Kuybyshev, Novosibirsk Oblast, a town in Novosibirsk Oblast

Rural localities

- Kuybyshev, Volgograd Oblast, a settlement in Kuybyshevsky Selsoviet of Sredneakhtubinsky District in Volgograd Oblast

== Renamed localities ==
- Kuybyshev, name of Samara, a city in Samara Oblast, in 1935–1990
- Kuybyshev, name of Bolgar, a town in Spassky District of the Republic of Tatarstan, in 1935–1991

== Alternative names ==
- Kuybyshev, alternative name of Kuybyshevo, a rural locality (a settlement) in Kuybyshevsky Selsoviet of Rubtsovsky District in Altai Krai; 51°35′N 81°8′E
