= Kuybyshevo, Rubtsovsky District, Altai Krai =

Kuybyshevo Куйбышево
- Settlement
- Location within Altai Krai Location within Russia
- Coordinates: 51°34′N 81°07′E
- Country: Russia
- Region: Altai Krai
- District: Rubtsovsky District
- Time zone: UTC+7:00

Kuybyshevo (Russian: Куйбышево) is a rural locality (a settlement) and the administrative center of Kuybyshevsky Selsoviet, Rubtsovsky District, Altai Krai, Russia. The population was 966 as of 2013. There are 8 streets.

== Geography ==
Kuybyshevo is located 18 km north of Rubtsovsk (the district's administrative centre) by road. Priozyorny is the nearest rural locality.
