= Guillaume Blot =

French cyclist

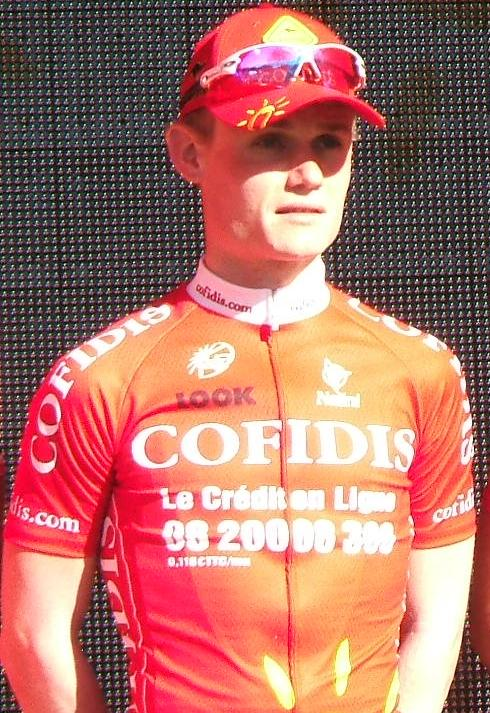
- Blot in 2009.

Personal information
- Full name: Guillaume Blot
- Born: 28 March 1985 (age 41) Saint-Malo, France

Cycling career
- Sport: Cycling
- Current team: Retired
- Discipline: Road
- Role: Rider
- Rider type: Sprinter

Amateur teams
- 2004–2005: VC Roubaix Lille Métropole
- 2006: Côtes d'Armor-Maître Jacques
- 2007–2008: USSA Pavilly Barentin
- 2008: Cofidis (stagiaire)
- 2014: USSA Pavilly Barentin

Professional teams
- 2009–2010: Cofidis
- 2011–2012: Bretagne–Schuller

Major wins
- One-day races and Classics GP de Fourmies (2011)

Guillaume Blot (born 28 March 1985 in Saint-Malo) is a French former racing cyclist, who competed professionally between 2009 and 2012 for the Cofidis and Bretagne–Schuller teams.

== Major results ==
2011
1st Grand Prix de Fourmies
1st Stage 3 Tour de Normandie
