= Iban Mayoz =

Spanish cyclist

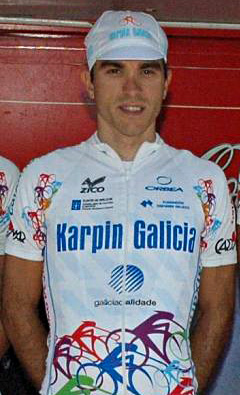

Personal information
- Full name: Iban Mayoz Echeverría
- Born: September 30, 1981 (age 45) San Sebastián, Spain

Cycling career
- Sport: Cycling
- Current team: None
- Discipline: Road
- Role: Rider

Professional teams
- 2004–2005: Relax
- 2006–2007: Euskaltel–Euskadi
- 2008–2009: Karpin–Galicia
- 2010: Footon–Servetto–Fuji

Iban Mayoz Echeverría (born September 30, 1981, in San Sebastián, Basque Country) is a Spanish professional road bicycle racer, currently not under contract to any team. He began his career at Relax in 2004 before moving to ProTour team Euskaltel–Euskadi in 2006, and then to Karpin–Galicia in 2008.

== Major results ==
2008 – Karpin–Galicia

- Tour of the Basque Country
  - Winner sprints classification
- Euskal Bizikleta
  - Winner sprints classification

2010 – Footon–Servetto–Fuji

- Vuelta a Castilla y León
  - Winner mountains classification
