= Francesco Failli =

Italian road bicycle racer

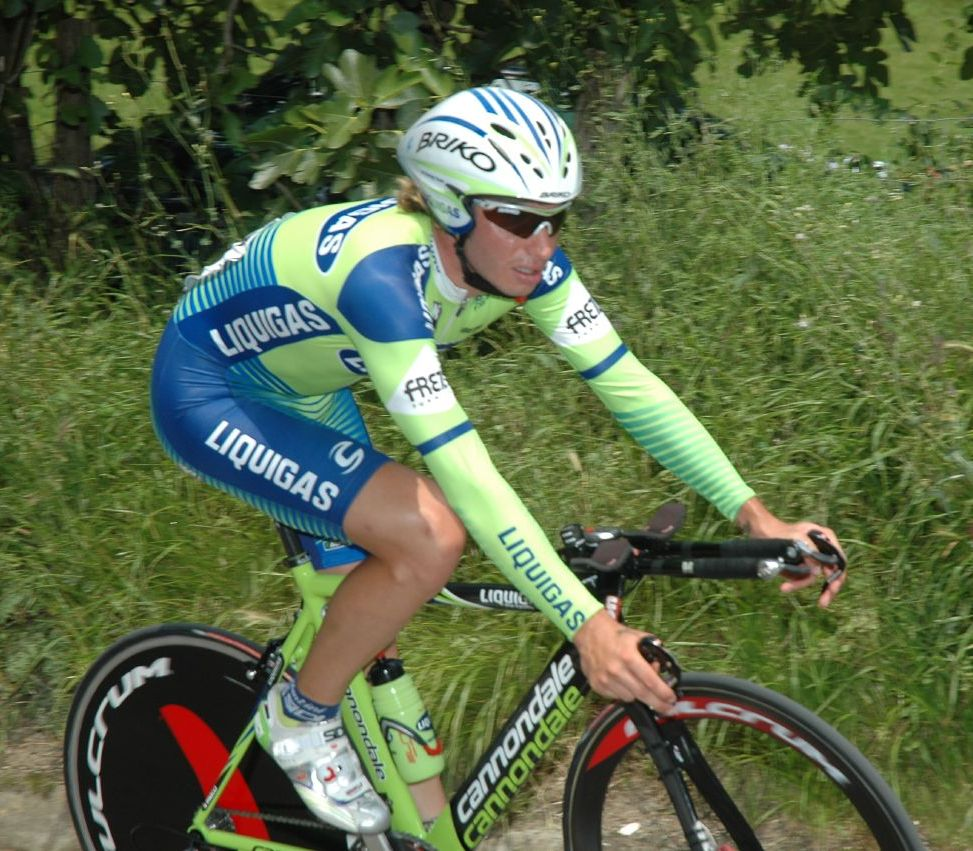

Personal information
- Full name: Francesco Failli
- Born: 16 December 1983 (age 42) Montevarchi, Italy
- Height: 1.81 m (5 ft 11 in)
- Weight: 65 kg (143 lb)

Cycling career
- Sport: Cycling
- Current team: Cicli Taddei
- Disciplines: Road; Mountain biking
- Role: Rider

Amateur team
- 2015–: Cicli Taddei–Specialized

Professional teams
- 2004: De Nardi–Piemme Telekom
- 2005: Naturino–Sapore di Mare
- 2006–2007: Liquigas
- 2008–2010: Acqua & Sapone–Caffè Mokambo
- 2011–2014: Farnese Vini–Neri Sottoli

Francesco Failli (born 16 December 1983 in Montevarchi) is an Italian former professional road bicycle racer, who competed professionally between 2004 and 2014 for the De Nardi–Piemme Telekom, Naturino–Sapore di Mare, Liquigas, Acqua & Sapone and Neri Sottoli teams. He now competes in mountain bike racing, with the Cicli Taddei team.

== Major results ==
2003
3rd Gran Premio della Liberazione
4th Ruota d'Oro
2004
4th Giro di Romagna
5th Giro del Friuli
8th Overall UNIQA Classic
2005
2nd GP Fred Mengoni
8th Giro di Toscana
2006
5th Overall Tour of Qinghai Lake
9th Tour du Haut Var
2008
1st Stage 6 Settimana Ciclistica Lombarda
3rd Overall Giro della Provincia di Reggio Calabria
6th GP Città di Camaiore
6th GP Industria & Commercio di Prato
8th Coppa Sabatini
9th Giro d'Oro
9th Memorial Cimurri
9th Giro del Lazio
10th Giro di Lombardia
2009
3rd Giro della Provincia di Reggio Calabria
6th GP Nobili Rubinetterie
8th Coppa Agostoni
2010
4th Trofeo Melinda
9th Overall Giro della Provincia di Reggio Calabria
10th GP Industria e Commercio Artigianato Carnaghese
2012
5th Coppa Sabatini
6th Trofeo Melinda
10th Coppa Agostoni

=== Grand Tour general classification results timeline ===
Grand Tour	2006	2007	2008	2009	2010	2011	2012	2013
Giro d'Italia	—	—	—	91	65	DNF	58	—
Tour de France	—	—	—	—	—	—	—	—
Vuelta a España	123	—	—	—	—	—	—	—

Legend
—	Did not compete
DNF	Did not finish
