= Alexander Efimkin =

Russian road bicycle racer

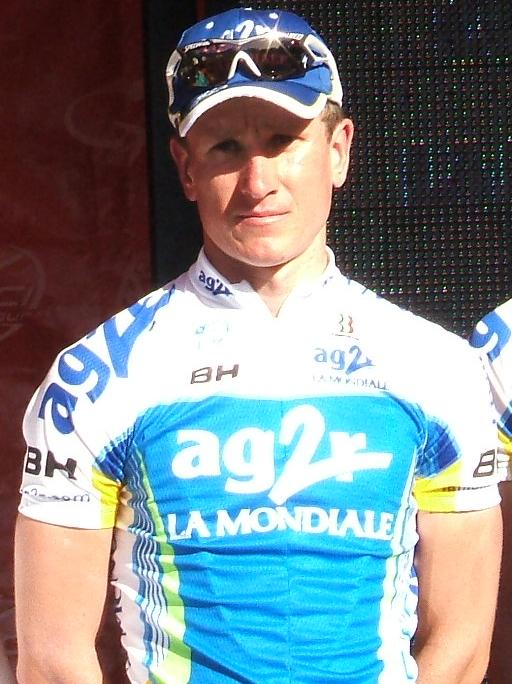
- Efimkin at the 2009 Tour Down Under

Personal information
- Full name: Alexander Alexandrovich Efimkin
- Born: 2 December 1981 (age 44) Kuybyshev, Soviet Union
- Height: 1.82 m (6 ft 0 in)
- Weight: 70 kg (154 lb)

Cycling career
- Sport: Cycling
- Discipline: Road
- Role: Rider; Directeur sportif
- Rider type: Climbing specialist

Professional teams
- 2006–2007: Barloworld
- 2008: Quick-Step
- 2009–2010: Ag2r–La Mondiale
- 2011–2012: Team Type 1–Sanofi Aventis

Managerial teams
- 2013: Russian Helicopters
- 2013: RusVelo Women's Team
- 2014–2015: RusVelo

Major wins
- Stage races Tour of Turkey (2011)

Alexander Alexandrovich Efimkin (Russian: Александр Александрович Ефимкин; born 2 December 1981 in Kuybyshev) is a Russian former professional road bicycle racer, who competed professionally between 2006 and 2012 for the Barloworld, Quick-Step, Ag2r–La Mondiale and Team Type 1–Sanofi teams. Efimkin has also worked as the directeur sportif of the Russian Helicopters team in 2013, the RusVelo Women's Team in 2013 and the men's RusVelo team in 2014 and 2015.

The twin brother of Vladimir Efimkin, Alexander Efimkin burst on to the professional cycling scene in 2005 with a 2nd place overall at the Settimana Ciclistica Lombarda, a highly competitive race. Since that time he has proven a competent professional racer, with few victories to his name. In part this is owing to his service to the stars of his team, and in part due to his relatively young age.

== Major results ==
2005
1st Stage 3 Volta a Portugal
2nd Overall Settimana Ciclistica Lombarda
2006
2nd Road race, National Road Championships
3rd Overall Volta ao Alentejo
2007
1st Overall Settimana Ciclistica Lombarda

1st Stage 3

1st Overall Giro del Capo

1st Stage 3

2008
10th Overall Paris–Nice
2009
3rd Paris–Camembert
2011
1st Overall Tour of Turkey
