= Jérôme Pineau =

French cyclist (born 1980)

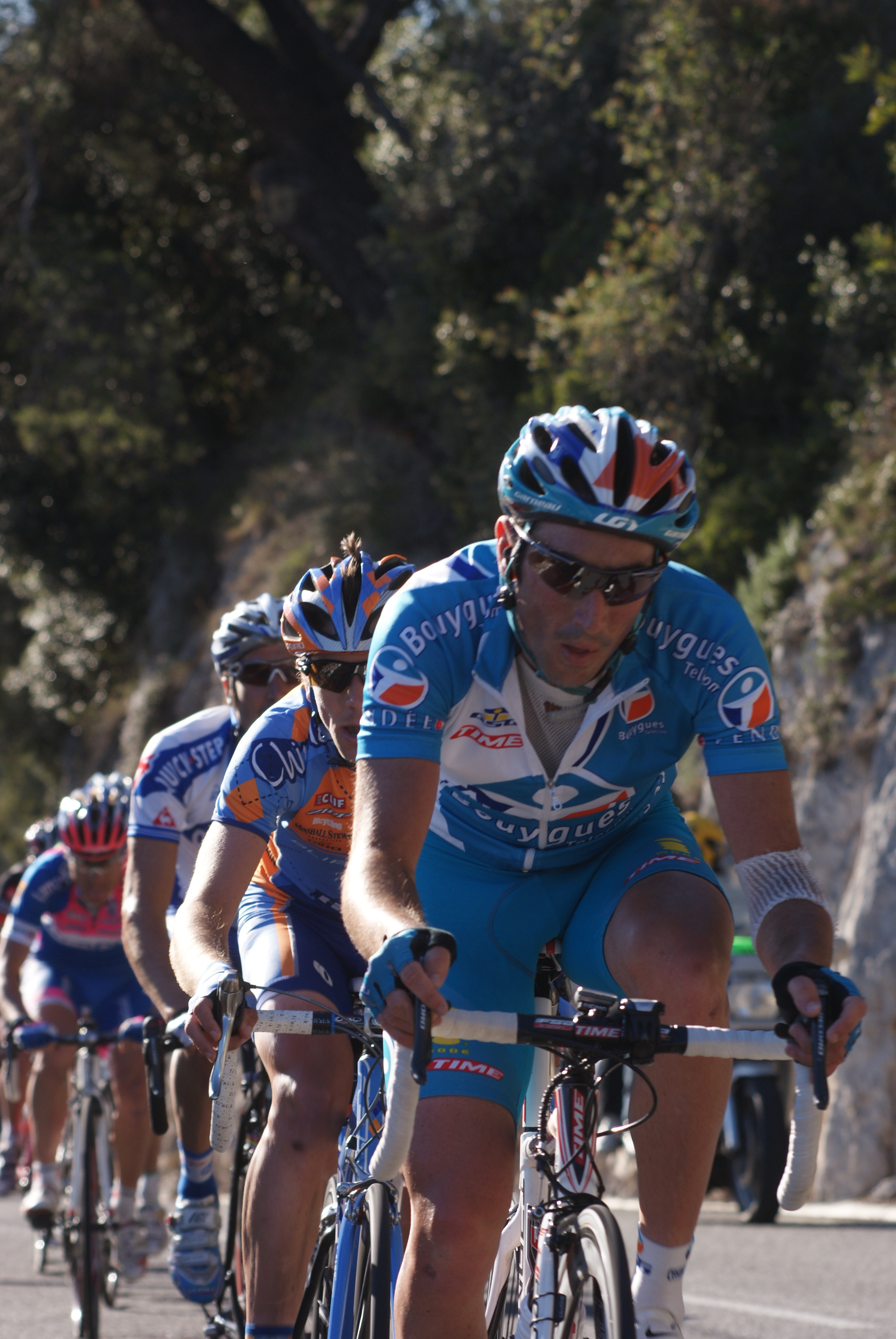
- Pineau at the 2008 Paris–Nice.

Personal information
- Full name: Jérôme Pineau
- Born: 2 January 1980 (age 46) Mont-Saint-Aignan, France
- Height: 1.76 m (5 ft 9 in)
- Weight: 65 kg (143 lb)

Cycling career
- Sport: Cycling
- Current team: B&B Hotels p/b KTM
- Discipline: Road
- Role: Rider (retired); General manager
- Rider type: Classics specialist; Baroudeur

Professional teams
- 2002–2008: Bonjour
- 2009–2013: Quick-Step
- 2014–2015: IAM Cycling

Managerial team
- 2018–2022: Vital Concept

Major wins
- Paris–Bourges (2004); Clásica de Almería (2004); Tour de l'Ain (2004), 2 stages Polynormande (2003); Tour of Normandy (2002); Giro d'Italia, 1 stage (2010)

Jérôme Pineau (born 2 January 1980) is a French former professional road bicycle racer, who rode professionally between 2002 and 2015 for the Bouygues Télécom, Omega Pharma–Quick-Step and IAM Cycling squads. Born in Mont-Saint-Aignan, Pineau now works as the general manager for UCI ProSeries team B&B Hotels p/b KTM.

== Major results ==
2000
5th Overall Ruban Granitier Breton
9th La Côte Picarde
2001
1st Stage 1 Ronde de l'Isard
2nd Road race, National Under-23 Road Championships
4th Liège–Bastogne–Liège U23
5th La Côte Picarde
2002
1st Overall Tour de Normandie
4th Route Adélie
7th Grand Prix de la Ville de Lillers
7th Grand Prix de Villers-Cotterêts
9th Trophée des Grimpeurs
2003
1st Polynormande
3rd Overall Tour de l'Ain

1st Stage 1

3rd Tour de Vendée
3rd Trophée des Grimpeurs
5th Overall Étoile de Bessèges
5th Gran Premio di Lugano
5th Grand Prix de Plumelec-Morbihan
7th Grand Prix de Denain
7th Boucles de l'Aulne
2004
1st Overall Tour de l'Ain

1st Stage 1

1st Paris–Bourges
1st Clásica de Almería
3rd Overall International Hessen Rundfahrt
3rd Trophée des Grimpeurs
3rd Züri-Metzgete
3rd Grand Prix de Wallonie
5th Tour de Vendée
5th Polynormande
6th Grand Prix La Marseillaise
7th GP Miguel Induráin
8th Overall Étoile de Bessèges
2005
3rd Route Adélie
9th Amstel Gold Race
2006
6th Trophée des Grimpeurs
7th Cholet-Pays de Loire
2007
7th Overall Tour du Limousin
10th Liège–Bastogne–Liège
2008
2nd Paris–Camembert
2nd Polynormande
3rd Grand Prix de Wallonie
4th Overall Critérium International
4th Grand Prix de Plumelec-Morbihan
5th Cholet-Pays de Loire
5th Châteauroux Classic
5th Grand Prix de Fourmies
6th Trophée des Grimpeurs
7th Overall Volta a la Comunitat Valenciana
8th Overall Tour du Limousin
10th Amstel Gold Race
2009
2nd Brabantse Pijl
6th Overall Tour du Haut Var
9th Trofeo Calvià
2010
Giro d'Italia

1st Stage 5
1st Premio della Fuga

Tour de France

Combativity award Stage 7
King of the Mountains (Stages 2–8 and 10–11)

2011
1st Grote Prijs Jef Scherens
9th Brabantse Pijl
10th Overall La Tropicale Amissa Bongo
2012
5th Boucles du Sud Ardèche
7th Overall Four Days of Dunkirk
2014
5th Gran Premio di Lugano
9th Overall Tour du Haut Var

=== Grand Tour general classification results timeline ===
Grand Tour	2002	2003	2004	2005	2006	2007	2008	2009	2010	2011	2012	2013	2014	2015
Giro d'Italia	—	—	—	—	—	—	—	—	58	83	—	123	—	DNF
Tour de France	87	71	27	43	81	68	37	85	63	52	112	159	58	—
Vuelta a España	—	—	—	—	DNF	—	—	—	—	—	—	—	—	—

Legend
—	Did not compete
DNF	Did not finish
