= List of teams and cyclists in the 2009 Giro d'Italia =

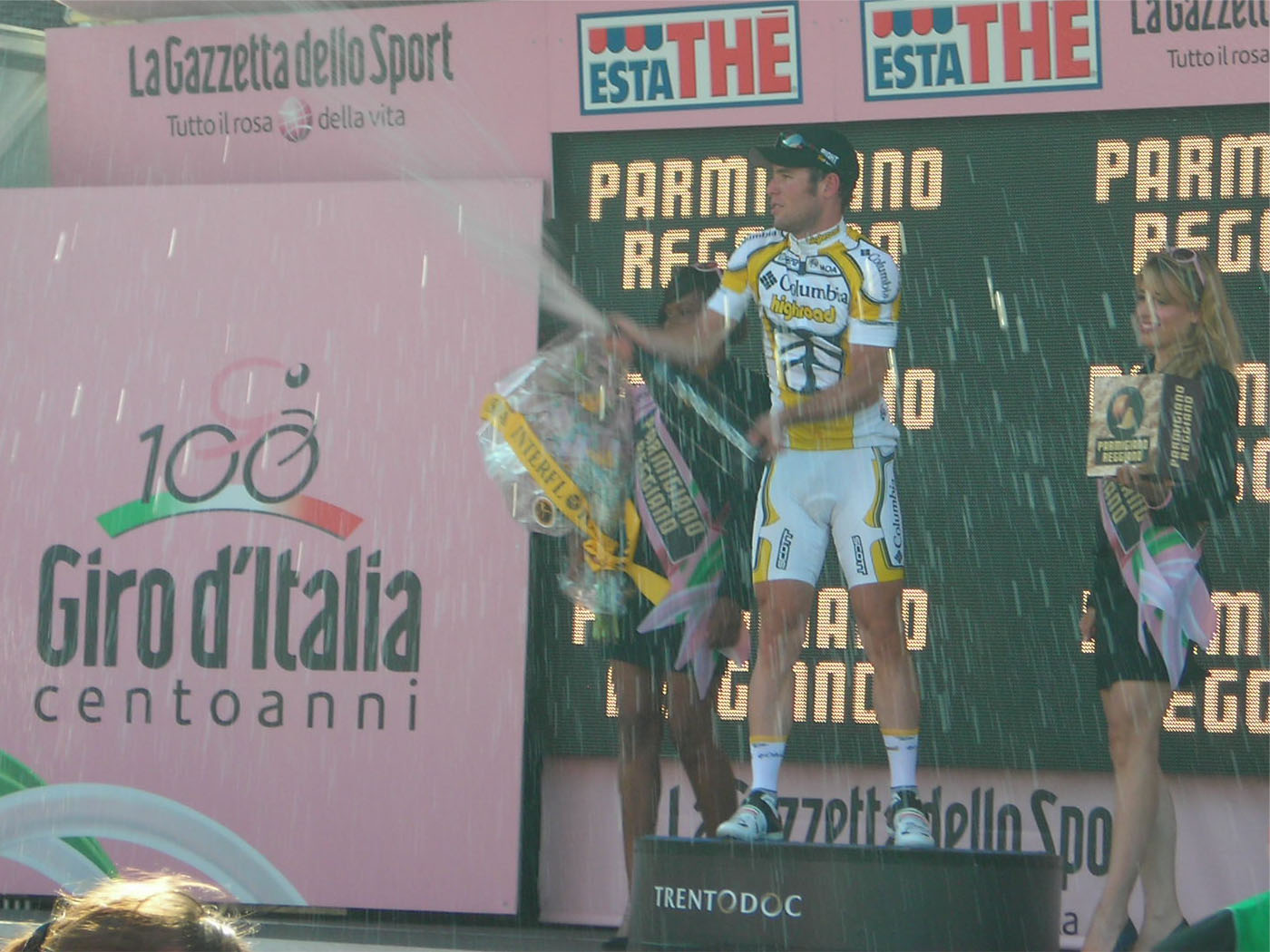
Mark Cavendish on the podium in Arenzano after winning stage 11

The 2009 Giro d'Italia was the 92nd edition of Giro d'Italia, one of cycling's Grand Tours, and marked 100 years since the first race in 1909. The centenary Giro featured 198 riders from 30 countries on 22 cycling teams, starting in Venice on 9 May and finishing in Rome on 31 May.

Among the 22 teams who took part in the Giro, 15 were ProTour teams, and seven were Professional Continental teams. Three ProTeams did not wish to participate, and were thus not invited – these were Cofidis, Euskaltel–Euskadi, and Française des Jeux. Fuji–Servetto, on the other hand, were declined an invitation at first, but on 23 April, they were invited as the Giro's 22nd and final team. The seven Professional Continental teams included were Acqua & Sapone–Caffè Mokambo, Barloworld, Cervélo TestTeam, Diquigiovanni–Androni, ISD, LPR Brakes–Farnese Vini, and Xacobeo–Galicia. Each of the 22 teams invited to the race entered a squad of nine riders.

Twenty-nine riders abandoned the three-week race before reaching Rome. Denis Menchov of the Rabobank team won the race; after taking the lead in a long individual time trial in stage 12, he did not let his closest challenger and second-place finisher Danilo Di Luca of LPR Brakes–Farnese Vini escape during the mountain stages of the last week. It was announced on 22 July that Di Luca's A-sample tested positive for the erythropoietin (EPO) derivative, continuous erythropoietin receptor activator (CERA), on 20 May and 28 May. Franco Pellizotti of the Liquigas team claimed the last spot on the podium, 1 minute and 47 seconds in front of fourth-place finisher and 2008 Tour de France winner, Carlos Sastre of Cervélo TestTeam. Di Luca also won the points classification, but because his B-sample confirmed the initial doping results, it is highly unlikely that he will keep the jersey and his second place in the general classification. The mountains classification was won by Stefano Garzelli of Acqua & Sapone–Caffè Mokambo, and the young rider classification was won by Kevin Seeldraeyers of the Quick-Step team.

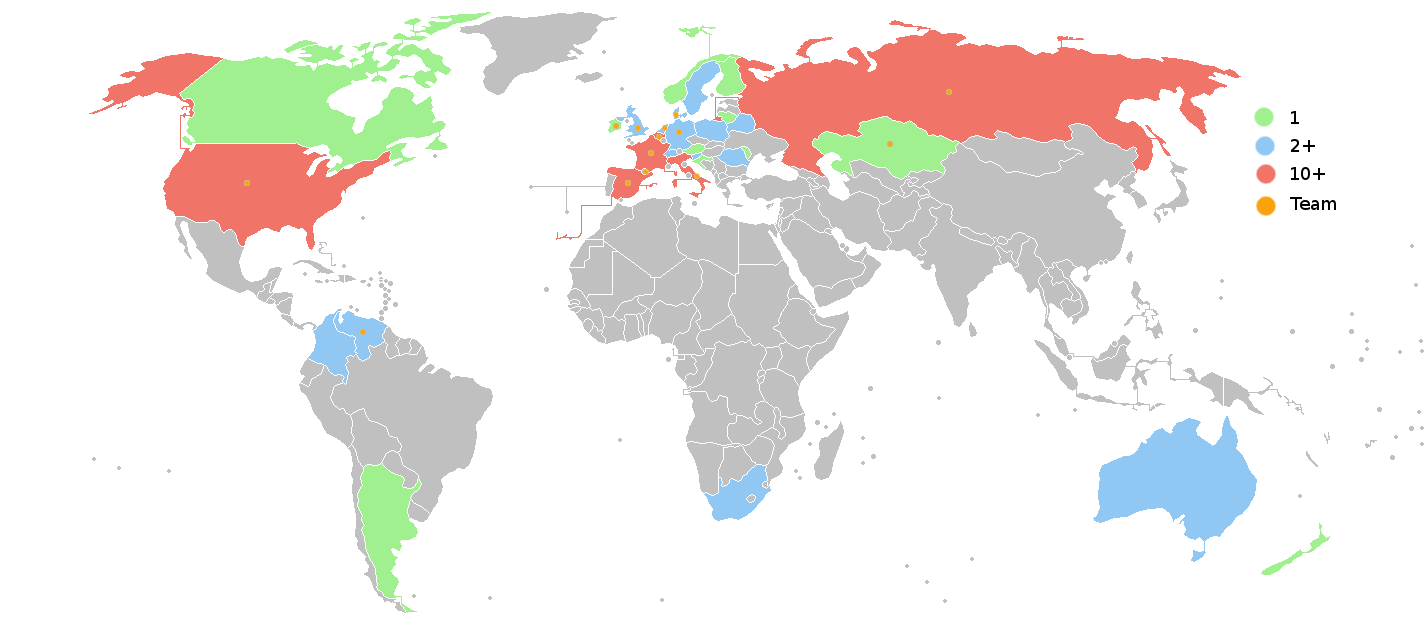
Teams and riders that participated in 2009 Giro d'Italia as shown in the map.

== Teams ==
Legend
No.	Starting number worn by the rider during the Giro	Pos.	Position in the general classification
A pink jersey	Denotes the winner of the General classification	A green jersey	Denotes the winner of the Mountains classification
A violet jersey	Denotes the winner of the Points classification	A white jersey	Denotes the winner of the Young rider classification
DNS	Denotes a rider who did not start, followed by the stage before which they withdrew	DNF	Denotes a rider who did not finish, followed by the stage in which they withdrew

Acqua & Sapone–Caffè Mokambo
No.	Rider	Pos.
1	Stefano Garzelli (ITA)	7
2	Dario Andriotto (ITA)	DNF-19
3	Massimo Codol (ITA)	DNF-16
4	Alessandro Donati (ITA)	109
5	Francesco Failli (ITA)	91
6	Ruggero Marzoli (ITA)	99
7	Andrea Masciarelli (ITA)	86
8	Francesco Masciarelli (ITA)	17
9	Giuseppe Palumbo (ITA)	158
Team manager: Franco Gini

Ag2r–La Mondiale
No.	Rider	Pos.
11	Tadej Valjavec (SLO)	9
12	Alexander Efimkin (RUS)	37
13	Sébastien Hinault (FRA)	135
14	Yuriy Krivtsov (UKR)	116
15	Julien Loubet (FRA)	DNF-8
16	Renaud Dion (FRA)	81
17	Jean-Charles Sénac (FRA)	146
18	Blaise Sonnery (FRA)	64
19	Guillaume Bonnafond (FRA)	87
Team manager: Laurent Biondi

Astana
No.	Rider	Pos.
21	Lance Armstrong (USA)	12
22	Janez Brajkovič (SLO)	18
23	Chris Horner (USA)	DNS-11
24	Levi Leipheimer (USA)	6
25	Steve Morabito (SUI)	88
26	Daniel Navarro (ESP)	31
27	Yaroslav Popovych (UKR)	15
28	José Luis Rubiera (ESP)	49
29	Andrey Zeits (KAZ)	35
General manager: Johan Bruyneel

Barloworld
No.	Rider	Pos.
31	Mauricio Soler (COL)	DNF-16
32	John-Lee Augustyn (RSA)	77
33	Francesco Bellotti (ITA)	58
34	Diego Caccia (ITA)	122
35	Félix Cárdenas (COL)	66
36	Giampaolo Cheula (ITA)	101
37	Chris Froome (GBR)	36
38	Robert Hunter (RSA)	154
39	Paolo Longo Borghini (ITA)	113
General manager: Claudio Corti

Bbox Bouygues Telecom
No.	Rider	Pos.
41	Julien Belgy (FRA)	151
42	Steve Chainel (FRA)	DNS-14
43	Yohann Gène (FRA)	DNF-16
44	Saïd Haddou (FRA)	163
45	Guillaume Le Floch (FRA)	129
46	Evgeny Sokolov (RUS)	169
47	Matthieu Sprick (FRA)	75
48	Johann Tschopp (SUI)	126
49	Thomas Voeckler (FRA)	89
Team manager: Jean-René Bernaudeau

Caisse d'Epargne
No.	Rider	Pos.
51	David Arroyo (ESP)	11
52	Arnold Jeannesson (FRA)	57
53	Vasil Kiryienka (BLR)	73
54	Pablo Lastras (ESP)	45
55	David López (ESP)	DNF-20
56	Francisco Pérez (ESP)	DNF-4
57	Mathieu Perget (FRA)	72
58	Joaquim Rodríguez (ESP)	DNF-11
59	Anthony Charteau (FRA)	104
General manager: Eusebio Unzué

Cervélo TestTeam
No.	Rider	Pos.
61	Carlos Sastre (ESP)	4
62	Philip Deignan (IRL)	56
63	Simon Gerrans (AUS)	43
64	Volodymir Gustov (UKR)	54
65	Jeremy Hunt (GBR)	150
66	Ted King (USA)	113
67	Ignatas Konovalovas (LTU)	90
68	Daniel Lloyd (GBR)	114
69	Serge Pauwels (BEL)	33
Team manager: Thomas Campana

Fuji–Servetto
No.	Rider	Pos.
71	Iker Camaño (ESP)	39
72	Eros Capecchi (ITA)	DNS-15
73	Davide Viganò (ITA)	156
74	Ángel Gómez (ESP)	80
75	Jesús Del Nero (ESP)	DNF-7
76	Héctor González (ESP)	103
77	Alberto Fernández de la Puebla (ESP)	165
78	Fredrik Kessiakoff (SWE)	50
79	Ricardo Serrano (ESP)	DNF-15
General manager: Álvaro Crespi

Garmin–Slipstream
No.	Rider	Pos.
81	Tom Danielson (USA)	78
82	Julian Dean (NZL)	136
83	Tyler Farrar (USA)	DNS-15
84	Cameron Meyer (AUS)	DNS-14
85	David Millar (GBR)	DNF-15
86	Danny Pate (USA)	144
87	Christian Vande Velde (USA)	DNF-3
88	Bradley Wiggins (GBR)	71
89	David Zabriskie (USA)	152
General manager: Jonathan Vaughters

ISD
No.	Rider	Pos.
91	Giovanni Visconti (ITA)	76
92	Oscar Gatto (ITA)	149
93	Dario Cioni (ITA)	47
94	Ian Stannard (GBR)	160
95	Andriy Hryvko (UKR)	22
96	Dmytro Grabovskyy (UKR)	67
97	Bartosz Huzarski (POL)	102
98	Leonardo Scarselli (ITA)	157
99	Ruslan Pidgornyy (UKR)	DNF-8
Team manager: Mykola Myrza and Luca Scinto

Lampre–NGC
No.	Rider	Pos.
101	Damiano Cunego (ITA)	19
102	Matteo Bono (ITA)	123
103	Marzio Bruseghin (ITA)	10
104	Mauro Da Dalto (ITA)	120
105	Enrico Gasparotto (ITA)	60
106	Francesco Gavazzi (ITA)	69
107	Marco Marzano (ITA)	51
108	Manuele Mori (ITA)	93
109	Paolo Tiralongo (ITA)	38
General manager: Giuseppe Saronni

Liquigas
No.	Rider	Pos.
111	Ivan Basso (ITA)	5
112	Valerio Agnoli (ITA)	61
113	Kjell Carlström (FIN)	62
114	Vladimir Miholjević (CRO)	53
115	Franco Pellizotti (ITA)	3
116	Manuel Quinziato (ITA)	106
117	Gorazd Štangelj (SLO)	96
118	Sylwester Szmyd (POL)	44
119	Alessandro Vanotti (ITA)	107
General manager: Roberto Amadio

LPR Brakes–Farnese Vini
No.	Rider	Pos.
121	Danilo Di Luca (ITA)	2
122	Gabriele Bosisio (ITA)	27
123	Riccardo Chiarini (ITA)	118
124	Giairo Ermeti (ITA)	138
125	Jure Golčer (SLO)	55
126	Matteo Montaguti (ITA)	143
127	Alessandro Petacchi (ITA)	121
128	Daniele Pietropolli (ITA)	94
129	Alessandro Spezialetti (ITA)	74
Team manager: Davide Boifava

Quick-Step
No.	Rider	Pos.
131	Allan Davis (AUS)	119
132	Dario Cataldo (ITA)	59
133	Dries Devenyns (BEL)	95
134	Addy Engels (NED)	112
135	Mauro Facci (ITA)	108
136	Francesco Reda (ITA)	139
137	Kevin Hulsmans (BEL)	98
138	Kevin Seeldraeyers (BEL)	14
139	Davide Malacarne (ITA)	DNF-18
General manager: Patrick Lefevere

Rabobank
No.	Rider	Pos.
141	Denis Menchov (RUS)	1
142	Mauricio Ardila (COL)	41
143	Laurens ten Dam (NED)	28
144	Jos van Emden (NED)	166
145	Bram de Groot (NED)	153
146	Pedro Horrillo (ESP)	DNF-8
147	Dmitry Kozonchuk (RUS)	79
148	Tom Stamsnijder (NED)	134
149	Maarten Tjallingii (NED)	100
General manager: Erik Breukink

Diquigiovanni–Androni
No.	Rider	Pos.
151	Gilberto Simoni (ITA)	24
152	Leonardo Bertagnolli (ITA)	46
153	Michele Scarponi (ITA)	32
154	Alessandro Bertolini (ITA)	92
155	José Serpa (COL)	13
156	Rubens Bertogliati (SUI)	68
157	Francesco De Bonis (ITA)	84
158	Carlos José Ochoa (VEN)	30
159	Jackson Rodríguez (VEN)	26
General manager: Ellena Giovanni

Silence–Lotto
No.	Rider	Pos.
161	Christophe Brandt (BEL)	70
162	Francis De Greef (BEL)	21
163	Bart Dockx (BEL)	168
164	Philippe Gilbert (BEL)	97
165	Pieter Jacobs (BEL)	130
166	Jonas Ljungblad (SWE)	128
167	Olivier Kaisen (BEL)	159
168	Jelle Vanendert (BEL)	DNF-14
169	Charly Wegelius (GBR)	105
Team manager: Marc Sergeant

Team Columbia–High Road
No.	Rider	Pos.
171	Michael Barry (CAN)	127
172	Edvald Boasson Hagen (NOR)	82
173	Mark Cavendish (GBR)	DNS-14
174	Thomas Löfkvist (SWE)	25
175	Marco Pinotti (ITA)	40
176	Morris Possoni (ITA)	83
177	Mark Renshaw (AUS)	DNS-14
178	Michael Rogers (AUS)	8
179	Kanstantsin Sivtsov (BLR)	16
General manager: Bob Stapleton

Team Katusha
No.	Rider	Pos.
181	Filippo Pozzato (ITA)	DNS-14
182	Pavel Brutt (RUS)	125
183	Nikita Eskov (RUS)	65
184	Mikhail Ignatiev (RUS)	167
185	Sergey Klimov (RUS)	137
186	Luca Mazzanti (ITA)	42
187	Evgeni Petrov (RUS)	34
188	Alexander Serov (RUS)	117
189	Ben Swift (GBR)	132
Team manager: Andrei Tchmil

Team Milram
No.	Rider	Pos.
191	Luca Barla (ITA)	141
192	Robert Förster (GER)	162
193	Markus Fothen (GER)	110
194	Thomas Fothen (GER)	133
195	Martin Müller (GER)	161
196	Thomas Rohregger (AUT)	29
197	Matthias Russ (GER)	DNF-2
198	Ronny Scholz (GER)	DNF-10
199	Björn Schröder (GER)	140
General manager: Gerry van Gerwen

Team Saxo Bank
No.	Rider	Pos.
201	Fabian Cancellara (SUI)	DNS-12
202	Jens Voigt (GER)	48
203	Anders Lund (DEN)	155
204	Jason McCartney (USA)	63
205	Juan José Haedo (ARG)	148
206	Jurgen Van Goolen (BEL)	85
207	Lars Bak (DEN)	20
208	Matthew Goss (AUS)	131
209	Kasper Klostergaard (DEN)	147
General manager: Bjarne Riis

Xacobeo–Galicia
No.	Rider	Pos.
211	Serafín Martínez (ESP)	142
212	Gustavo César (ESP)	145
213	David García (ESP)	DNF-5
214	Vladimir Isaichev (RUS)	164
215	Gonzalo Rabuñal (ESP)	115
216	Delio Fernández (ESP)	124
217	Iban Mayoz (ESP)	DNF-15
218	Marcos García (ESP)	52
219	Eduard Vorganov (RUS)	23
Team manager: Álvaro Pino

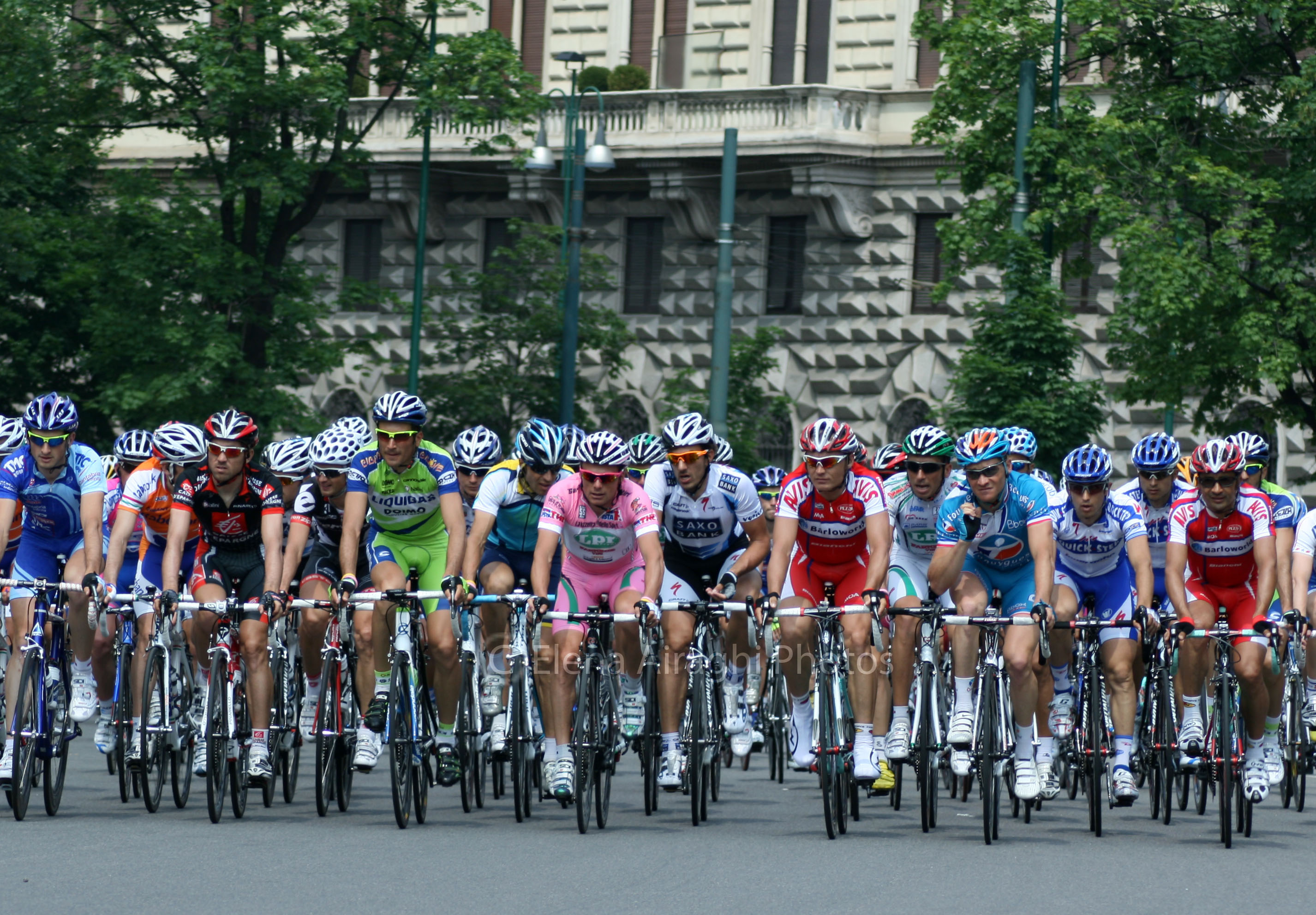
Cyclists during the 9th stage in Milan

== Cyclists ==
Legend
No.	Starting number worn by the rider during the Giro
Pos.	Position in the general classification
†	Denotes riders born on or after 1 January 1984 eligible for the Young rider classification
DNS	Denotes a rider who did not start, followed by the stage before which they withdrew
DNF	Denotes a rider who did not finish, followed by the stage in which they withdrew
Age correct as of 9 May 2009, the date on which the Giro began

No.	Rider	Team	Nationality	Age	Pos.
1	Stefano Garzelli → 2009 Mountains classification champion	Acqua & Sapone–Caffè Mokambo	Italy	35	7
2	Dario Andriotto	Acqua & Sapone–Caffè Mokambo	Italy	36	DNF-19
3	Massimo Codol	Acqua & Sapone–Caffè Mokambo	Italy	36	DNF-16
4	Alessandro Donati	Acqua & Sapone–Caffè Mokambo	Italy	30	109
5	Francesco Failli	Acqua & Sapone–Caffè Mokambo	Italy	25	91
6	Ruggero Marzoli	Acqua & Sapone–Caffè Mokambo	Italy	33	99
7	Andrea Masciarelli	Acqua & Sapone–Caffè Mokambo	Italy	26	86
8	Francesco Masciarelli	Acqua & Sapone–Caffè Mokambo	Italy	23^{†}	17
9	Giuseppe Palumbo	Acqua & Sapone–Caffè Mokambo	Italy	33	158
11	Tadej Valjavec	Ag2r–La Mondiale	Slovenia	33	9
12	Alexander Efimkin	Ag2r–La Mondiale	Russia	27	37
13	Sébastien Hinault	Ag2r–La Mondiale	France	35	135
14	Yuriy Krivtsov	Ag2r–La Mondiale	Ukraine	30	116
15	Julien Loubet	Ag2r–La Mondiale	France	24^{†}	DNF-8
16	Renaud Dion	Ag2r–La Mondiale	France	31	81
17	Jean-Charles Sénac	Ag2r–La Mondiale	France	23^{†}	146
18	Blaise Sonnery	Ag2r–La Mondiale	France	24^{†}	64
19	Guillaume Bonnafond	Ag2r–La Mondiale	France	21^{†}	87
21	Lance Armstrong	Astana	United States	37	12
22	Janez Brajkovič	Astana	Slovenia	25	18
23	Chris Horner	Astana	United States	37	DNS-11
24	Levi Leipheimer	Astana	United States	35	6
25	Steve Morabito	Astana	Switzerland	26	88
26	Daniel Navarro	Astana	Spain	25	31
27	Yaroslav Popovych	Astana	Ukraine	29	15
28	José Luis Rubiera	Astana	Spain	36	49
29	Andrey Zeits	Astana	Kazakhstan	22^{†}	35
31	Mauricio Soler	Barloworld	Colombia	26	DNF-16
32	John-Lee Augustyn	Barloworld	South Africa	22^{†}	77
33	Francesco Bellotti	Barloworld	Italy	29	58
34	Diego Caccia	Barloworld	Italy	27	122
35	Félix Cárdenas	Barloworld	Colombia	36	66
36	Giampaolo Cheula	Barloworld	Italy	29	101
37	Chris Froome	Barloworld	Great Britain	23^{†}	36
38	Robert Hunter	Barloworld	South Africa	32	154
39	Paolo Longo Borghini	Barloworld	Italy	28	113
41	Julien Belgy	Bbox Bouygues Telecom	France	26	151
42	Steve Chainel	Bbox Bouygues Telecom	France	25	DNS-14
43	Yohann Gène	Bbox Bouygues Telecom	France	27	DNF-16
44	Saïd Haddou	Bbox Bouygues Telecom	France	26	163
45	Guillaume Le Floch	Bbox Bouygues Telecom	France	24^{†}	129
46	Evgeny Sokolov	Bbox Bouygues Telecom	Russia	24^{†}	169
47	Matthieu Sprick	Bbox Bouygues Telecom	France	27	75
48	Johann Tschopp	Bbox Bouygues Telecom	Switzerland	26	126
49	Thomas Voeckler	Bbox Bouygues Telecom	France	29	89
51	David Arroyo	Caisse d'Epargne	Spain	29	11
52	Arnold Jeannesson	Caisse d'Epargne	France	23^{†}	57
53	Vasil Kiryienka	Caisse d'Epargne	Belarus	27	73
54	Pablo Lastras	Caisse d'Epargne	Spain	33	45
55	David López	Caisse d'Epargne	Spain	27	DNF-20
56	Francisco Pérez	Caisse d'Epargne	Spain	30	DNF-4
57	Mathieu Perget	Caisse d'Epargne	France	24^{†}	72
58	Joaquim Rodríguez	Caisse d'Epargne	Spain	29	DNF-11
59	Anthony Charteau	Caisse d'Epargne	France	29	104
61	Carlos Sastre	Cervélo TestTeam	Spain	34	4
62	Philip Deignan	Cervélo TestTeam	Ireland	25	56
63	Simon Gerrans	Cervélo TestTeam	Australia	28	43
64	Volodymir Gustov	Cervélo TestTeam	Ukraine	32	54
65	Jeremy Hunt	Cervélo TestTeam	Great Britain	34	150
66	Ted King	Cervélo TestTeam	United States	26	113
67	Ignatas Konovalovas	Cervélo TestTeam	Lithuania	23^{†}	90
68	Daniel Lloyd	Cervélo TestTeam	Great Britain	28	114
69	Serge Pauwels	Cervélo TestTeam	Belgium	25	33
71	Iker Camaño	Fuji–Servetto	Spain	30	39
72	Eros Capecchi	Fuji–Servetto	Italy	22^{†}	DNS-15
73	Davide Viganò	Fuji–Servetto	Italy	24^{†}	156
74	Ángel Gómez	Fuji–Servetto	Spain	27	80
75	Jesús Del Nero	Fuji–Servetto	Spain	27	DNF-7
76	Héctor González	Fuji–Servetto	Spain	23^{†}	103
77	Alberto Fernández de la Puebla	Fuji–Servetto	Spain	24^{†}	165
78	Fredrik Kessiakoff	Fuji–Servetto	Sweden	28	50
79	Ricardo Serrano	Fuji–Servetto	Spain	30	DNF-15
81	Tom Danielson	Garmin–Slipstream	United States	31	78
82	Julian Dean	Garmin–Slipstream	New Zealand	34	136
83	Tyler Farrar	Garmin–Slipstream	United States	24^{†}	DNS-15
84	Cameron Meyer	Garmin–Slipstream	Australia	21^{†}	DNS-14
85	David Millar	Garmin–Slipstream	Great Britain	32	DNF-15
86	Danny Pate	Garmin–Slipstream	United States	30	144
87	Christian Vande Velde	Garmin–Slipstream	United States	32	DNF-3
88	Bradley Wiggins	Garmin–Slipstream	Great Britain	29	71
89	David Zabriskie	Garmin–Slipstream	United States	30	152
91	Giovanni Visconti	ISD	Italy	26	76
92	Oscar Gatto	ISD	Italy	24^{†}	149
93	Dario Cioni	ISD	Italy	34	47
94	Ian Stannard	ISD	Great Britain	21^{†}	160
95	Andriy Hryvko	ISD	Ukraine	25	22
96	Dmytro Grabovskyy	ISD	Ukraine	23^{†}	67
97	Bartosz Huzarski	ISD	Poland	28	102
98	Leonardo Scarselli	ISD	Italy	34	157
99	Ruslan Pidgornyy	ISD	Ukraine	31	DNF-8
101	Damiano Cunego	Lampre–NGC	Italy	27	19
102	Matteo Bono	Lampre–NGC	Italy	25	123
103	Marzio Bruseghin	Lampre–NGC	Italy	34	10
104	Mauro Da Dalto	Lampre–NGC	Italy	28	120
105	Enrico Gasparotto	Lampre–NGC	Italy	27	60
106	Francesco Gavazzi	Lampre–NGC	Italy	24^{†}	69
107	Marco Marzano	Lampre–NGC	Italy	28	51
108	Manuele Mori	Lampre–NGC	Italy	28	93
109	Paolo Tiralongo	Lampre–NGC	Italy	31	38
111	Ivan Basso	Liquigas	Italy	31	5
112	Valerio Agnoli	Liquigas	Italy	24^{†}	61
113	Kjell Carlström	Liquigas	Finland	32	62
114	Vladimir Miholjević	Liquigas	Croatia	34	53
115	Franco Pellizotti	Liquigas	Italy	31	3
116	Manuel Quinziato	Liquigas	Italy	29	106
117	Gorazd Štangelj	Liquigas	Slovenia	36	96
118	Sylwester Szmyd	Liquigas	Poland	31	44
119	Alessandro Vanotti	Liquigas	Italy	28	107
121	Danilo Di Luca	LPR Brakes–Farnese Vini	Italy	33	2
122	Gabriele Bosisio	LPR Brakes–Farnese Vini	Italy	28	27
123	Riccardo Chiarini	LPR Brakes–Farnese Vini	Italy	25^{†}	118
124	Giairo Ermeti	LPR Brakes–Farnese Vini	Italy	28	138
125	Jure Golčer	LPR Brakes–Farnese Vini	Slovenia	31	55
126	Matteo Montaguti	LPR Brakes–Farnese Vini	Italy	25^{†}	143
127	Alessandro Petacchi	LPR Brakes–Farnese Vini	Italy	35	121
128	Daniele Pietropolli	LPR Brakes–Farnese Vini	Italy	28	94
129	Alessandro Spezialetti	LPR Brakes–Farnese Vini	Italy	34	74
131	Allan Davis	Quick-Step	Australia	28	119
132	Dario Cataldo	Quick-Step	Italy	24^{†}	59
133	Dries Devenyns	Quick-Step	Belgium	25	95
134	Addy Engels	Quick-Step	Netherlands	31	112
135	Mauro Facci	Quick-Step	Italy	26	108
136	Francesco Reda	Quick-Step	Italy	26	139
137	Kevin Hulsmans	Quick-Step	Belgium	31	98
138	Kevin Seeldraeyers	Quick-Step	Belgium	22^{†}	14
139	Davide Malacarne	Quick-Step	Italy	21	DNF-18
141	Denis Menchov	Rabobank	Russia	31	1
142	Mauricio Ardila	Rabobank	Colombia	29	41
143	Laurens ten Dam	Rabobank	Netherlands	28	28
144	Jos van Emden	Rabobank	Netherlands	24^{†}	166
145	Bram de Groot	Rabobank	Netherlands	34	153
146	Pedro Horrillo	Rabobank	Spain	34	DNF-8
147	Dmitry Kozonchuk	Rabobank	Russia	25^{†}	79
148	Tom Stamsnijder	Rabobank	Netherlands	23^{†}	134
149	Maarten Tjallingii	Rabobank	Netherlands	31	100
151	Gilberto Simoni	Diquigiovanni–Androni	Italy	37	24
152	Leonardo Bertagnolli	Diquigiovanni–Androni	Italy	31	46
153	Michele Scarponi	Diquigiovanni–Androni	Italy	29	32
154	Alessandro Bertolini	Diquigiovanni–Androni	Italy	37	92
155	José Serpa	Diquigiovanni–Androni	Colombia	30	13
156	Rubens Bertogliati	Diquigiovanni–Androni	Switzerland	30	68
157	Francesco De Bonis	Diquigiovanni–Androni	Italy	27	84
158	Carlos José Ochoa	Diquigiovanni–Androni	Venezuela	28	30
159	Jackson Rodríguez	Diquigiovanni–Androni	Venezuela	24^{†}	26
161	Christophe Brandt	Silence–Lotto	Belgium	32	70
162	Francis De Greef	Silence–Lotto	Belgium	24^{†}	21
163	Bart Dockx	Silence–Lotto	Belgium	27	168
164	Philippe Gilbert	Silence–Lotto	Belgium	26	97
165	Pieter Jacobs	Silence–Lotto	Belgium	22^{†}	130
166	Jonas Ljungblad	Silence–Lotto	Sweden	30	128
167	Olivier Kaisen	Silence–Lotto	Belgium	26	159
168	Jelle Vanendert	Silence–Lotto	Belgium	24^{†}	DNF-14
169	Charly Wegelius	Silence–Lotto	Great Britain	31	105
171	Michael Barry	Team Columbia–High Road	Canada	33	127
172	Edvald Boasson Hagen	Team Columbia–High Road	Norway	21^{†}	82
173	Mark Cavendish	Team Columbia–High Road	Great Britain	23^{†}	DNS-14
174	Thomas Löfkvist	Team Columbia–High Road	Sweden	25^{†}	25
175	Marco Pinotti	Team Columbia–High Road	Italy	33	40
176	Morris Possoni	Team Columbia–High Road	Italy	24^{†}	83
177	Mark Renshaw	Team Columbia–High Road	Australia	26	DNS-14
178	Michael Rogers	Team Columbia–High Road	Australia	29	8
179	Kanstantsin Sivtsov	Team Columbia–High Road	Belarus	26	16
181	Filippo Pozzato	Team Katusha	Italy	27	DNS-14
182	Pavel Brutt	Team Katusha	Russia	27	125
183	Nikita Eskov	Team Katusha	Russia	26	65
184	Mikhail Ignatiev	Team Katusha	Russia	24^{†}	167
185	Sergey Klimov	Team Katusha	Russia	28	137
186	Luca Mazzanti	Team Katusha	Italy	35	42
187	Evgeni Petrov	Team Katusha	Russia	30	34
188	Alexander Serov	Team Katusha	Russia	26	117
189	Ben Swift	Team Katusha	Great Britain	21^{†}	132
191	Luca Barla	Team Milram	Italy	21^{†}	141
192	Robert Förster	Team Milram	Germany	31	162
193	Markus Fothen	Team Milram	Germany	27	110
194	Thomas Fothen	Team Milram	Germany	26	133
195	Martin Müller	Team Milram	Germany	35	161
196	Thomas Rohregger	Team Milram	Austria	26	29
197	Matthias Russ	Team Milram	Germany	25	DNF-2
198	Ronny Scholz	Team Milram	Germany	31	DNF-10
199	Björn Schröder	Team Milram	Germany	28	140
201	Fabian Cancellara	Team Saxo Bank	Switzerland	28	DNS-12
202	Jens Voigt	Team Saxo Bank	Germany	37	48
203	Anders Lund	Team Saxo Bank	Denmark	24^{†}	155
204	Jason McCartney	Team Saxo Bank	United States	35	63
205	Juan José Haedo	Team Saxo Bank	Argentina	28	148
206	Jurgen Van Goolen	Team Saxo Bank	Belgium	28	85
207	Lars Bak	Team Saxo Bank	Denmark	29	20
208	Matthew Goss	Team Saxo Bank	Australia	22^{†}	131
209	Kasper Klostergaard	Team Saxo Bank	Denmark	25	147
211	Serafín Martínez	Xacobeo–Galicia	Spain	25^{†}	142
212	Gustavo César	Xacobeo–Galicia	Spain	29	145
213	David García	Xacobeo–Galicia	Spain	31	DNF-5
214	Vladimir Isaichev	Xacobeo–Galicia	Russia	23^{†}	164
215	Gonzalo Rabuñal	Xacobeo–Galicia	Spain	24^{†}	115
216	Delio Fernández	Xacobeo–Galicia	Spain	23^{†}	124
217	Iban Mayoz	Xacobeo–Galicia	Spain	27	DNF-15
218	Marcos García	Xacobeo–Galicia	Spain	22^{†}	52
219	Eduard Vorganov	Xacobeo–Galicia	Russia	26	23
