= 2009 Giro d'Italia, Stage 12 to Stage 21 =

Stage 12 to Stage 21 of the 2009 Giro d'Italia

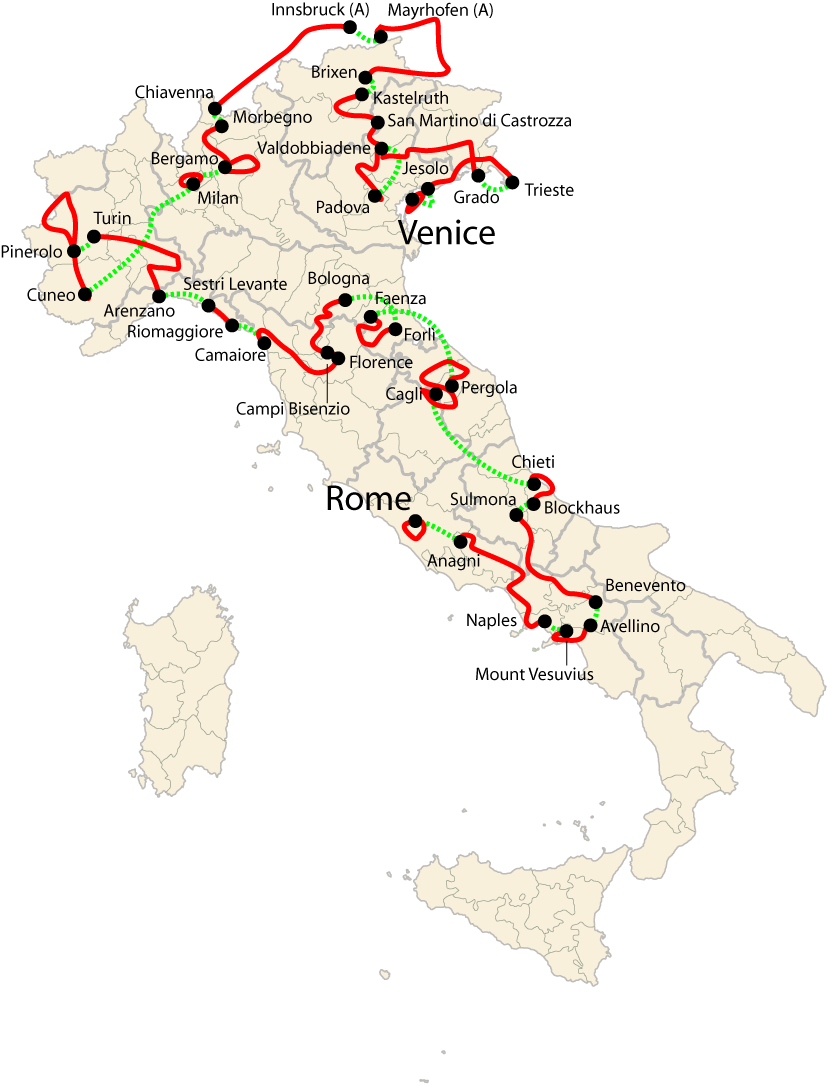
Overview of the stages; red lines represent distances covered in the individual stages, while green lines are the distances between the stages

Stage 12 of the 2009 Giro d'Italia took place on 21 May; the race concluded with Stage 21 on 31 May. The second half of the Giro began with a long and challenging individual time trial in Cinque Terre. It was in this time trial that Denis Menchov took the overall lead in the race. This was followed by a flat stage, after which most of the sprinters in the Giro withdrew from the race, as they did not figure to be in contention in the hilly and mountainous stages to follow.

The sixteenth stage was considered to be one of two queen stages, most difficult stages, of this Giro, as it contained many high mountain climbs and the Giro's most difficult summit stage finish. After the second rest day came an unusual stage, one that was very short in terms of sheer distance but on par with previous mountain stages in terms of difficulty. These stages were won by Carlos Sastre and Franco Pellizotti, respectively, who fought for the third step on the Giro's podium behind Menchov and previous race leader Danilo Di Luca. Though Sastre went on to win another stage, to Mount Vesuvius, it was Pellizotti who finished the Giro third overall.

The Giro concluded, as it had in 2008, with another individual time trial, this time in the city of Rome. Despite a dramatic and much-replayed crash in the stage's final kilometer, Menchov preserved his overall lead through this stage and thus, the conclusion of the Giro, winning his third career Grand Tour.

Legend
A pink jersey	Denotes the leader of the General classification	A green jersey	Denotes the leader of the Mountains classification
A violet jersey	Denotes the leader of the Points classification	A white jersey	Denotes the leader of the Young rider classification
	s.t. indicates that the rider crossed the finish line in the same group as the one receiving the time above him, and was therefore credited with the same finishing time.		

== Stage 12 ==
21 May 2009 — Sestri Levante to Riomaggiore, 60.6 km (37.7 mi) (individual time trial)

The first individual time trial (ITT) of the 2009 Giro was a difficult one, long with quite a lot of climbing. There were two categorized climbs on the course, a quick, intense descent between them and no flat stretches at all. Lance Armstrong, who rode the Giro for the first time in 2009, described the ITT as "wicked hard". Reigning Olympic time trial champion Fabian Cancellara called it "crazy" and laughed when asked if he would be a contender for victory. Cancellara was in fact the only rider who was still in the race to this point who did not attempt the time trial, instead abandoning the Giro.

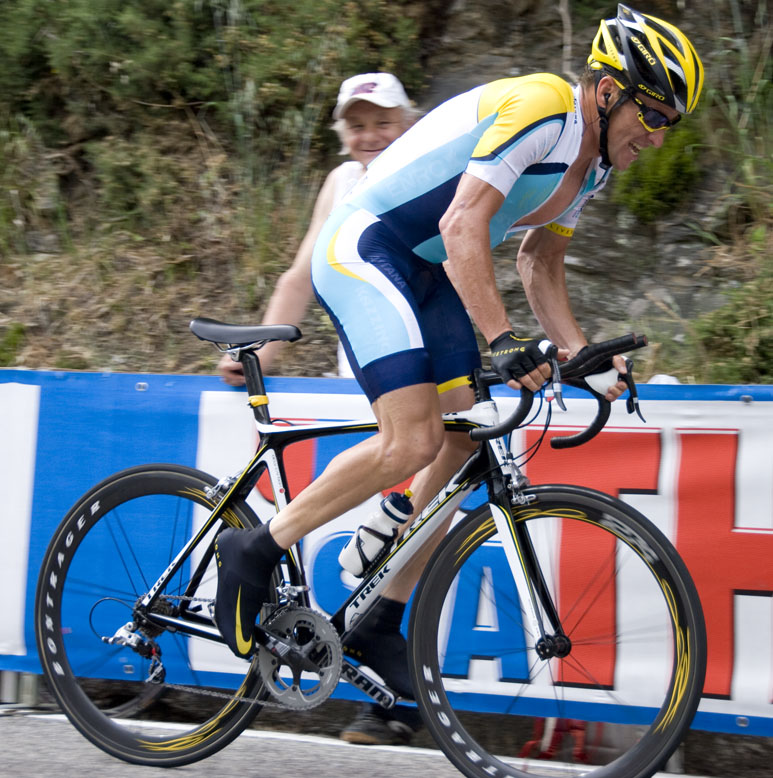
Lance Armstrong during the Cinque Terre time trial, sporting the "faded" Astana jersey.

Many riders used normal road race bikes for this stage, as the course is highly atypical for a time trial, with roads that were not flat and straight. Most of those riders altered their road race bikes with the aerodynamic handlebars of a time trial bike, but some, including race leader Danilo Di Luca, did not. The climbs in the stage increased the overall chances for strong climbers who are relatively weak time trialists, such as Damiano Cunego and Gilberto Simoni.

Acqua & Sapone rider Dario Andriotto set the early time to beat. After a while, Yuriy Krivtsov bested his time. Several different riders in succession then posted successively (but, in the first few cases, marginally) better times than the best time that had come before them. Alessandro Bertolini, David Millar, Marco Pinotti, Giovanni Visconti, Bradley Wiggins, and Stefano Garzelli were all briefly the stage leader after they crossed the finish line. Bertolini in particular was stage leader for about three minutes, as Millar started just behind him and barely beat his time.

The fourth- and second-to-last riders to leave the starthouse, Levi Leipheimer and Denis Menchov, put up the best rides of the day, with Menchov between 30 seconds and a minute better than Leipheimer at the three intermediate time checks, and 20 seconds better at the line for the stage win. Menchov's ride propelled him into the pink jersey, while Leipheimer narrowly missed taking enough time out of Di Luca to move past him in the general classification. Di Luca finished sixth on the stage.

A surprising rider to lose considerable time was three-time former world time trial champion Michael Rogers, who was almost three minutes off Menchov's winning time and slipped from third to sixth in the general classification. Reigning Tour de France champion Carlos Sastre was also unimpressive, 2'18" behind Menchov, but took advantage of Rogers' bigger misstep to move up to fifth overall.

Stage 12 result

	Rider	Team	Time
1	Denis Menchov (RUS)	Rabobank	1h 34' 29"
2	Levi Leipheimer (USA)	Astana	+ 20"
3	Stefano Garzelli (ITA)	Acqua & Sapone–Caffè Mokambo	+ 1' 03"
4	Janez Brajkovič (SLO)	Astana	+ 1' 14"
DSQ	~~Franco Pellizotti (ITA)~~	~~Liquigas~~	+ 1' 27"
DSQ	~~Danilo Di Luca (ITA)~~	~~LPR Brakes–Farnese Vini~~	+ 1' 54"
7	Bradley Wiggins (GBR)	Garmin–Slipstream	+ 1' 59"
8	Gabriele Bosisio (ITA)	LPR Brakes–Farnese Vini	+ 2' 04"
9	José Serpa (COL)	Diquigiovanni–Androni	+ 2' 13"
10	Marzio Bruseghin (ITA)	Lampre–NGC	+ 2' 17"

General classification after stage 12

	Rider	Team	Time
1	Denis Menchov (RUS)	Rabobank	50h 27' 17"
DSQ	~~Danilo Di Luca (ITA)~~	~~LPR Brakes–Farnese Vini~~	+ 34"
3	Levi Leipheimer (USA)	Astana	+ 40"
DSQ	~~Franco Pellizotti (ITA)~~	~~Liquigas~~	+ 2' 00"
5	Carlos Sastre (ESP)	Cervélo TestTeam	+ 2' 52"
6	Michael Rogers (AUS)	Team Columbia–High Road	+ 2' 59"
7	Ivan Basso (ITA)	Liquigas	+ 3' 00"
8	Gilberto Simoni (ITA)	Diquigiovanni–Androni	+ 4' 38"
9	Marzio Bruseghin (ITA)	Lampre–NGC	+ 5' 26"
10	Thomas Lövkvist (SWE)	Team Columbia–High Road	+ 5' 53"

== Stage 13 ==
22 May 2009 — Lido di Camaiore to Florence, 176 km (109 mi)

The riders got some respite in this short, flat stage. There were a few short hills in the first 60 km (37 mi) of the stage and one small categorized climb, but after the 60 kilometer mark the course did not so much as undulate, and a sprint finish was the result.

Three riders broke free of the peloton after 12 km (7.5 mi) — Mikhail Ignatiev, Leonardo Scarselli, and Björn Schröder. Their maximum advantage was 5'20", but the peloton had no trouble catching them. Ignatiev and Scarselli were absorbed with 32 km (20 mi) left to race, while Schröder fought on alone, being caught at around 6 km (3.7 mi) to go. Despite being seven riders deep in the bunch with under 1 km (0.62 mi) to go, Mark Cavendish was able to get a successful leadout from Edvald Boasson Hagen and Mark Renshaw to pick up his third stage win of the Giro. The leadout was so fast that only 21 riders had the same time as the stage winner — another 89, including each of the top ten in the General classification (GC), were eight seconds back. Cavendish actually missed the start of the stage, after becoming stuck in the race village due to his habit of lining up on the start of the race at the last minute to avoid press. He was picked up by a Rabobank team car, which was also running late, and brought back to the field by them. He went on to win the stage.

Stage 13 result

	Rider	Team	Time
1	Mark Cavendish (GBR)	Team Columbia–High Road	3h 48' 36"
2	Alessandro Petacchi (ITA)	LPR Brakes–Farnese Vini	s.t.
3	Allan Davis (AUS)	Quick-Step	s.t.
4	Robert Hunter (RSA)	Barloworld	s.t.
5	Tyler Farrar (USA)	Garmin–Slipstream	s.t.
6	Juan José Haedo (ARG)	Team Saxo Bank	s.t.
7	Robert Förster (GER)	Team Milram	s.t.
8	Ben Swift (GBR)	Team Katusha	s.t.
9	Davide Viganò (ITA)	Fuji–Servetto	s.t.
10	Sébastien Hinault (FRA)	Ag2r–La Mondiale	s.t.

General classification after stage 13

	Rider	Team	Time
1	Denis Menchov (RUS)	Rabobank	54h 16' 01"
DSQ	~~Danilo Di Luca (ITA)~~	~~LPR Brakes–Farnese Vini~~	+ 34"
3	Levi Leipheimer (USA)	Astana	+ 40"
DSQ	~~Franco Pellizotti (ITA)~~	~~Liquigas~~	+ 2' 00"
5	Carlos Sastre (ESP)	Cervélo TestTeam	+ 2' 52"
6	Michael Rogers (AUS)	Team Columbia–High Road	+ 2' 59"
7	Ivan Basso (ITA)	Liquigas	+ 3' 00"
8	Gilberto Simoni (ITA)	Diquigiovanni–Androni	+ 4' 38"
9	Marzio Bruseghin (ITA)	Lampre–NGC	+ 5' 26"
10	Thomas Lövkvist (SWE)	Team Columbia–High Road	+ 5' 53"

== Stage 14 ==
23 May 2009 — Campi Bisenzio to Bologna, 172 km (107 mi)

This was a hilly stage, with four categorized climbs on the course and a finish on a short (but categorized) climb as well. Pre-race analysis of the stage expected relentless attacks beginning from the first climb of the day, after 24 km (15 mi).

Fourteen riders representing twelve teams broke away after 12 km (7.5 mi). They stayed clear as a group through the four climbs on course before they started to splinter. Danilo Di Luca's LPR team drove the peloton most of the day, because the finish figured to favor Di Luca more than race leader Denis Menchov or the man in third, Levi Leipheimer. However, one team pulling at the front of the peloton proved to be no match for a 14-man breakaway working cohesively, and by the time the peloton reached the descent of the fourth climb, the last before the summit finish, it was clear the breakaway would not be caught. The breakaway was still twelve strong as it began the last climb of the day. Andriy Hryvko was the first to attack for the stage win, but he was caught well before the summit, and wound up finishing in the pink jersey group a minute behind the stage winner. The decisive attack came from Simon Gerrans, who no one could match, giving the Cervélo rider the stage win. Leipheimer and Ivan Basso were both dropped from the pink jersey group just before the summit of the climb and the end of the stage, losing three potentially valuable seconds to the other highly placed riders in the GC. Michael Rogers was a further three seconds back of Leipheimer and Basso, causing him to drop from sixth to seventh in the GC.

Stage 14 result

	Rider	Team	Time
1	Simon Gerrans (AUS)	Cervélo TestTeam	4h 16' 48"
2	Rubens Bertogliati (SUI)	Diquigiovanni–Androni	+ 12"
3	Francesco Gavazzi (ITA)	Lampre–NGC	+ 18"
4	Evgeni Petrov (RUS)	Team Katusha	+ 24"
5	Philip Deignan (IRL)	Cervélo TestTeam	+ 27"
6	Chris Froome (GBR)	Barloworld	+ 36"
7	Vasil Kiryienka (BLR)	Caisse d'Epargne	+ 41"
8	Francesco Reda (ITA)	Quick-Step	+ 1' 01"
9	Andriy Hryvko (UKR)	ISD	+ 1' 04"
DSQ	~~Franco Pellizotti (ITA)~~	~~Liquigas~~	s.t.

General classification after stage 14

	Rider	Team	Time
1	Denis Menchov (RUS)	Rabobank	58h 33' 53"
DSQ	~~Danilo Di Luca (ITA)~~	~~LPR Brakes–Farnese Vini~~	+ 34"
3	Levi Leipheimer (USA)	Astana	+ 43"
DSQ	~~Franco Pellizotti (ITA)~~	~~Liquigas~~	+ 2' 00"
5	Carlos Sastre (ESP)	Cervélo TestTeam	+ 2' 52"
6	Ivan Basso (ITA)	Liquigas	+ 3' 03"
7	Michael Rogers (AUS)	Team Columbia–High Road	+ 3' 05"
8	Gilberto Simoni (ITA)	Diquigiovanni–Androni	+ 5' 17"
9	Marzio Bruseghin (ITA)	Lampre–NGC	+ 5' 26"
10	David Arroyo (ESP)	Caisse d'Epargne	+ 6' 01"

== Stage 15 ==
24 May 2009 — Forlì to Faenza, 161 km (100 mi)

The peloton faced four categorized climbs in this stage, though none were considered difficult enough to be truly selective. Also on the profile were three uncategorized hills that simply were not as steep. With a 10 km (6.2 mi) flat section at the end of the stage, a breakaway finish was likely.

The day began with 16 riders from 14 teams breaking away, after about 18 km (11 mi). They attained a maximum advantage of about six minutes, and race leader Denis Menchov's Rabobank team seemed content to let them go, since no real GC threat was posed: José Serpa was the best placed man in the break, ten minutes back of Menchov. For a while, it seemed that the stage would progress this way to its conclusion, with the breakaway up ahead and the peloton not really chasing very hard.

Things changed when Ivan Basso's team came forward on the third climb of the day to set a much faster pace in the peloton, and Basso himself attacked and came free, with only Stefano Garzelli holding his wheel. They caught some members of the morning breakaway, as that group also splintered, but were eventually themselves caught. Danilo Di Luca launched an attack on the fourth climb of the day, and for a time he and Menchov were clear of the other GC contenders, but they were also caught — the top seven in the GC were unchanged after this stage.

After the 16-man leading group began splintering, only two were left out front — Leonardo Bertagnolli and Serge Pauwels. For unclear reasons, Pauwels sat up (abandoned the breakaway attempt) in the final kilometers of the stage and left Bertagnolli to take the stage win uncontested. Pauwels joined two behind him who were chasing, as several riders who had been in the pink jersey group but were not overall threats had been allowed to attack on the way into the finish. The pink jersey group finished 1'56" behind the stage winner, with another 13 riders about 7 minutes back, and the majority of the field between 18 and 26 minutes back, after the peloton had been one cohesive group for close to two-thirds of the stage.

Stage 15 result

	Rider	Team	Time
DSQ	~~Leonardo Bertagnolli (ITA)~~	~~Diquigiovanni–Androni~~	4h 18' 34"
2	Serge Pauwels (BEL)	Cervélo TestTeam	+ 54"
3	Marco Pinotti (ITA)	Team Columbia–High Road	s.t.
4	Lars Bak (DEN)	Team Saxo Bank	s.t.
5	Marco Marzano (ITA)	Lampre–NGC	+ 56"
6	Andriy Hryvko (UKR)	ISD	+ 1' 27"
7	Mauro Facci (ITA)	Quick-Step	+ 1' 49"
DSQ	~~Tadej Valjavec (SLO)~~	~~Ag2r–La Mondiale~~	+ 1' 51"
9	Eduard Vorganov (RUS)	Xacobeo–Galicia	s.t.
10	Kevin Seeldraeyers (BEL)	Quick-Step	+ 1' 56"

General classification after stage 15

	Rider	Team	Time
1	Denis Menchov (RUS)	Rabobank	62h 54' 23"
DSQ	~~Danilo Di Luca (ITA)~~	~~LPR Brakes–Farnese Vini~~	+ 34"
3	Levi Leipheimer (USA)	Astana	+ 43"
DSQ	~~Franco Pellizotti (ITA)~~	~~Liquigas~~	+ 2' 00"
5	Carlos Sastre (ESP)	Cervélo TestTeam	+ 2' 52"
6	Ivan Basso (ITA)	Liquigas	+ 3' 03"
7	Michael Rogers (AUS)	Team Columbia–High Road	+ 3' 05"
8	Marzio Bruseghin (ITA)	Lampre–NGC	+ 5' 26"
9	David Arroyo (ESP)	Caisse d'Epargne	+ 6' 01"
10	Thomas Lövkvist (SWE)	Team Columbia–High Road	+ 6' 26"

== Stage 16 ==
25 May 2009 — Pergola to Monte Petrano, 237 km (147 mi)

This stage was extremely climbing-intensive, with three categorized high mountains, including a mountaintop finish with a very difficult gradient at Monte Petrano, and a smaller climb about a third of the way into the stage. It also had five short uncategorized hills. Following the alterations to Stage 10, this was also called the queen stage of the Giro.

A large early breakaway began the stage, for the third day in a row. This breakaway numbered 20, which after the first category one climb was whittled down to three, as some riders dropped because of the pace and others, from the teams of race leader Denis Menchov and other contenders, were called back by their sporting directors to stay with their team leaders. The three left out front were Yaroslav Popovych, Damiano Cunego, and Gabriele Bosisio. Eventually, Popovych shed his last remaining breakaway mates and for a time appeared poised for the stage win. The pink jersey group absorbed every member of the morning's breakaway except Popovych and Cunego by the time they began the Monte Petrano climb. Levi Leipheimer, who had previously stated that this was the day he might attack to move up the general classification, was dropped on Monte Petrano and despite the efforts of Lance Armstrong and Janez Brajkovič to pace him back into the pink jersey group, Leipheimer wound up finishing nearly three minutes behind the stage winner, falling from third to sixth in the general classification and effectively eliminating any designs he may have had on the pink jersey. Armstrong had been near the leaders on the climb, but dropped back to help Leipheimer, who would later say that Armstrong saved him "minutes and minutes" by shepherding him to the finish.

Danilo Di Luca tried to attack from the pink jersey group a few times at the foot of the climb, but Menchov answered each time. When Ivan Basso and Carlos Sastre attacked, Menchov and Di Luca let them go, seeming fixed solely on one another. Sastre's attack proved to be the crucial one, as he seemed quite fresh for having been climbing for over seven hours, staying clear of the pink jersey and blowing past Popovych to claim the stage win. With the time gained on the road as well as bonus seconds at the line, Sastre moved up to third in the overall classification. Menchov outsprinted Di Luca to the finish line, gaining one second on the road and four bonus seconds to slightly pad his lead over Di Luca. Thomas Lövkvist, who had been in the white jersey as best young rider, was dropped very early on in this stage and finished 24 minutes behind the stage winner. He wound up dropping all the way to fifth in the youth classification, with Quick Step rider Kevin Seeldraeyers, 15th overall, assuming the white jersey.

The weather was also a major factor on the day, with the temperature topping out at over 35 °C (95 °F). It caused riders all throughout the race to lose contact with various groups.

Stage 16 result

	Rider	Team	Time
1	Carlos Sastre (ESP)	Cervélo TestTeam	7h 11' 54"
2	Denis Menchov (RUS)	Rabobank	+ 25"
DSQ	~~Danilo Di Luca (ITA)~~	~~LPR Brakes–Farnese Vini~~	+ 26"
4	Ivan Basso (ITA)	Liquigas	+ 29"
5	Stefano Garzelli (ITA)	Acqua & Sapone–Caffè Mokambo	+ 1' 19"
6	Francesco Masciarelli (ITA)	Acqua & Sapone–Caffè Mokambo	+ 1' 21"
DSQ	~~Franco Pellizotti (ITA)~~	~~Liquigas~~	s.t.
DSQ	~~Tadej Valjavec (SLO)~~	~~Ag2r–La Mondiale~~	+ 2' 11"
9	José Serpa (COL)	Diquigiovanni–Androni	+ 2' 35"
DSQ	~~Lance Armstrong (USA)~~	~~Astana~~	+ 2' 51"

General classification after stage 16

	Rider	Team	Time
1	Denis Menchov (RUS)	Rabobank	70h 06' 30"
DSQ	~~Danilo Di Luca (ITA)~~	~~LPR Brakes–Farnese Vini~~	+ 39"
3	Carlos Sastre (ESP)	Cervélo TestTeam	+ 2' 19"
DSQ	~~Franco Pellizotti (ITA)~~	~~Liquigas~~	+ 3' 08"
5	Ivan Basso (ITA)	Liquigas	+ 3' 19"
6	Levi Leipheimer (USA)	Astana	+ 3' 21"
7	Michael Rogers (AUS)	Team Columbia–High Road	+ 5' 54"
8	Stefano Garzelli (ITA)	Acqua & Sapone–Caffè Mokambo	+ 8' 21"
9	David Arroyo (ESP)	Caisse d'Epargne	+ 8' 39"
DSQ	~~Tadej Valjavec (SLO)~~	~~Ag2r–La Mondiale~~	+ 8' 47"

== Stage 17 ==
27 May 2009 — Chieti to Blockhaus, 83 km (52 mi)

After the second rest day, the peloton faced the Giro's shortest stage. It was originally scheduled to include the highest point in the 2009 Giro, but the route was changed from the published maps due to the amount of snow at the top of the Blockhaus mountain pass, with 4 km (2.5 mi) of climbing replaced by an equivalent addition to the flat section at the beginning of the stage. The first 44 km (27 mi) of this course were almost perfectly flat, followed by a slight increase in gradient for the next 16 km (9.9 mi), followed by an exceptionally steep final 23 km (14 mi).

Thomas Voeckler started the day's breakaway after about 10 km (6.2 mi). Nine riders followed him, and their maximum advantage was just under three minutes, with the chase beginning in earnest very early on this stage due to its short length. Many of the riders in the break were unable to maintain the pace set by Voeckler at the foot of the Blockhaus for very long, as only Voeckler, Félix Cárdenas, and Giuseppe Palumbo were left out front as the climb began. The subsequent attacks from the pink jersey group absorbed the three of them. When Sylwester Szmyd attacked from the pink jersey group as the climb began, Franco Pellizotti followed him and was able to get clear, as Szmyd paced him to sizable gap over the pink jersey group before hitting the wall. Lance Armstrong tried to follow, but could not reach Pellizotti, as Pellizotti decided not to wait for Armstrong and chose to race the climb like a time trial. His strong, steady climb was good for the stage win. Armstrong finished the stage in the third group on the road, along with Levi Leipheimer and Carlos Sastre.

Sastre's team had been the one setting the pace in the peloton just before the climb, but fell off when Philip Deignan spun out and tumbled off the road into a ditch. Deignan's bike was damaged and he sustained numerous visible scrapes and bruises, but he managed to continue and finish the stage with the last gruppetto. Sastre himself seemed to be off the form he had had before the rest day, and by virtue of Pellizotti's stage win and two-minute gap over the reigning Tour de France champion, he fell from third to fifth in the overall classification with Pellizotti moving up to third.

A quartet of riders made the climb in second position on the road behind Pellizotti: race leader Denis Menchov, Danilo Di Luca, Ivan Basso, and Stefano Garzelli. Di Luca rode with a very high cadence in an attempt to separate himself from Menchov, but was unable to until the sprint for the finish line. By virtue of the time bonuses gained for third place as well as the gap on the road, Di Luca closed his deficit to Menchov to under 30 seconds.

Stage 17 result

	Rider	Team	Time
DSQ	~~Franco Pellizotti (ITA)~~	~~Liquigas~~	~~2h 21' 06"~~
1	Stefano Garzelli (ITA)	Acqua & Sapone–Caffè Mokambo	2h 21' 48"
DSQ	~~Danilo Di Luca (ITA)~~	~~LPR Brakes–Farnese Vini~~	+ 01"
4	Denis Menchov (RUS)	Rabobank	+ 06"
5	Ivan Basso (ITA)	Liquigas	+ 15"
6	Marzio Bruseghin (ITA)	Lampre–NGC	+ 1' 12"
7	Sylwester Szmyd (POL)	Liquigas	+ 1' 13"
8	Michael Rogers (AUS)	Team Columbia–High Road	+ 1' 17"
9	Carlos Sastre (ESP)	Cervélo TestTeam	s.t.
DSQ	~~Lance Armstrong (USA)~~	~~Astana~~	s.t.

General classification after stage 17

	Rider	Team	Time
1	Denis Menchov (RUS)	Rabobank	72h 28' 24"
DSQ	~~Danilo Di Luca (ITA)~~	~~LPR Brakes–Farnese Vini~~	+ 26"
DSQ	~~Franco Pellizotti (ITA)~~	~~Liquigas~~	+ 2' 00"
4	Ivan Basso (ITA)	Liquigas	+ 3' 28"
5	Carlos Sastre (ESP)	Cervélo TestTeam	+ 3' 30"
6	Levi Leipheimer (USA)	Astana	+ 4' 32"
7	Michael Rogers (AUS)	Team Columbia–High Road	+ 7' 05"
8	Stefano Garzelli (ITA)	Acqua & Sapone–Caffè Mokambo	+ 8' 03"
DSQ	~~Tadej Valjavec (SLO)~~	~~Ag2r–La Mondiale~~	+ 9' 58"
10	Marzio Bruseghin (ITA)	Lampre–NGC	+ 10' 33"

== Stage 18 ==
28 May 2009 — Sulmona to Benevento, 182 km (113 mi)

The field faced a climb after just 20 km (12 mi) in this stage, but following a long and technical descent, the course was gently undulating without any other categorized climbs. Due to the absence of climbs, the stage was expected to favor the Giro's remaining sprinters, but it wound up being contested by a breakaway.

The stage began with the largest successful breakaway of the Giro, 25 riders representing 18 teams. The only teams that missed the break were Milram, Ag2r, Fuji–Servetto, and the team of the race leader, Rabobank. They worked together as a cohesive unit for much of the stage, gaining a maximum six-minute advantage over the peloton. Seven of the 25 broke free with 15 km (9.3 mi) left to race, and they contested a final sprint for the stage win. The first rider to try to take the win was Dries Devenyns, but he was quickly overtaken by Félix Cárdenas, who was in turn passed by Danny Pate. Pate, however, had the breakaway's most experienced rider, Michele Scarponi, in his slipstream, and it was Scarponi who timed his sprint just right to take the stage win. The high-placed riders in the general classification all finished with the peloton, 3' 57" behind the stage winner, so there was no change to the top ten overall.

It was after this stage, on the eve of the Mount Vesuvius stage, that Danilo Di Luca gave his second positive test for continuous erythropoiesis receptor activator (CERA).

Stage 18 result

	Rider	Team	Time
1	Michele Scarponi (ITA)	Diquigiovanni–Androni	4h 07' 41"
2	Félix Cárdenas (COL)	Barloworld	s.t.
3	Danny Pate (USA)	Garmin–Slipstream	s.t.
4	Lars Bak (DEN)	Team Saxo Bank	s.t.
5	Dmytro Grabovskyy (UKR)	ISD	+ 6"
6	Dries Devenyns (BEL)	Quick-Step	+ 20"
7	Jason McCartney (USA)	Team Saxo Bank	+ 24"
8	Giovanni Visconti (ITA)	ISD	+ 37"
9	Alessandro Bertolini (ITA)	Diquigiovanni–Androni	+ 39"
10	Gabriele Bosisio (ITA)	LPR Brakes–Farnese Vini	+ 42"

General classification after stage 18

	Rider	Team	Time
1	Denis Menchov (RUS)	Rabobank	76h 40' 02"
DSQ	~~Danilo Di Luca (ITA)~~	~~LPR Brakes–Farnese Vini~~	+ 26"
DSQ	~~Franco Pellizotti (ITA)~~	~~Liquigas~~	+ 2' 00"
4	Ivan Basso (ITA)	Liquigas	+ 3' 28"
5	Carlos Sastre (ESP)	Cervélo TestTeam	+ 3' 30"
6	Levi Leipheimer (USA)	Astana	+ 4' 32"
7	Michael Rogers (AUS)	Team Columbia–High Road	+ 7' 05"
8	Stefano Garzelli (ITA)	Acqua & Sapone–Caffè Mokambo	+ 8' 03"
DSQ	~~Tadej Valjavec (SLO)~~	~~Ag2r–La Mondiale~~	+ 9' 58"
10	Marzio Bruseghin (ITA)	Lampre–NGC	+ 10' 33"

== Stage 19 ==
29 May 2009 - Avellino to Mount Vesuvius, 164 km (102 mi)

The first 151 km (94 mi) of this stage saw rough undulation, with many uncategorized hills, including one at almost 500 m (1,600 ft) in elevation. The final 13 km (8.1 mi) saw a steep climb up to the famous Mount Vesuvius at 1,000 m (3,300 ft).

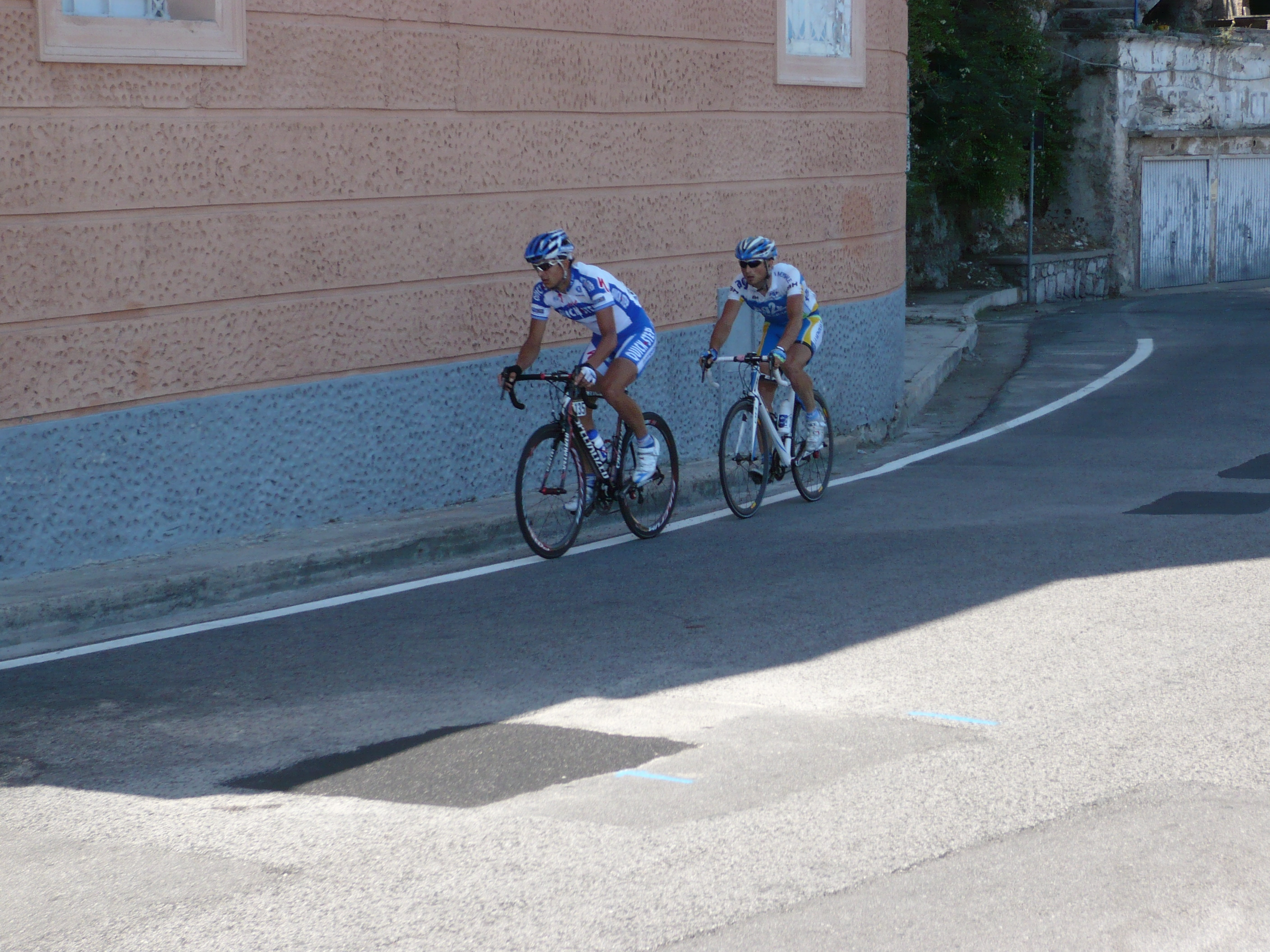
Mauro Facci and Yuriy Krivstov, the breakaway, as they passed through a small town on the way to Mount Vesuvius.

The breakaway on this stage comprised only two riders, both representing ProTour teams that were without a stage victory in this year's Giro — Mauro Facci of Quick Step and Yuriy Krivtsov of Ag2r–La Mondiale. Their maximum advantage over the peloton was just over seven minutes, but the pink jersey group of overall contenders and their teammates had no trouble catching them, as they did in the little town just before the Mount Vesuvius climb.

Liquigas tried the same tactic they had employed on the Blockhaus, when Franco Pellizotti took the stage win, as Valerio Agnoli was the first to attack and get clear of the pink jersey group. He was joined soon after not by one of his team leaders, Pellizotti or Ivan Basso, but by Lampre–NGC rider Paolo Tiralongo, as the overall contenders did not respond. These two wound up being absorbed by the subsequent attack from Carlos José Ochoa, who drew Basso and Stefano Garzelli with him, as they took an appreciable lead on the pink jersey group. Carlos Sastre attacked solo from the pink jersey group next and quickly passed all other riders on the road, and stayed out front to claim his second stage win of this Giro.

Much as they had in previous stages, race leader Denis Menchov and the man in second place Danilo Di Luca stayed right with one another all through the climb, as Di Luca tried repeatedly to shed Menchov with attacks, but was unable to. Pellizotti, who had also been holding their wheels, took the opportunity with the two of them taking energy out of each other, to come clear and move into third position on the road. Basso, who was up the road, dutifully sat up and waited for his better-placed teammate and paced him to a small gap over Menchov and Di Luca before cracking. It was enough to ensure Pellizotti second on the stage, to keep him third in the overall classification. Di Luca managed to outsprint Menchov to the line and claim 8 bonus seconds to narrow his deficit to 18 seconds, but with only a flat stage and an individual time trial remaining the superior time trialist Menchov had the advantage.

Stage 19 result

	Rider	Team	Time
1	Carlos Sastre (ESP)	Cervélo TestTeam	4h 33' 23"
DSQ	~~Franco Pellizotti (ITA)~~	~~Liquigas~~	+ 21"
DSQ	~~Danilo Di Luca (ITA)~~	~~LPR Brakes–Farnese Vini~~	+ 30"
4	Denis Menchov (RUS)	Rabobank	s.t.
5	Ivan Basso (ITA)	Liquigas	+ 35"
6	Levi Leipheimer (USA)	Astana	+ 53"
DSQ	~~Tadej Valjavec (SLO)~~	~~Ag2r–La Mondiale~~	+ 1' 14"
8	Serge Pauwels (BEL)	Cervélo TestTeam	+ 1' 15"
9	José Serpa (COL)	Diquigiovanni–Androni	s.t.
10	Stefano Garzelli (ITA)	Acqua & Sapone–Caffè Mokambo	s.t.

General classification after stage 19

	Rider	Team	Time
1	Denis Menchov (RUS)	Rabobank	81h 13' 55"
DSQ	~~Danilo Di Luca (ITA)~~	~~LPR Brakes–Farnese Vini~~	+ 18"
DSQ	~~Franco Pellizotti (ITA)~~	~~Liquigas~~	+ 1' 39"
4	Carlos Sastre (ESP)	Cervélo TestTeam	+ 2' 40"
5	Ivan Basso (ITA)	Liquigas	+ 3' 33"
6	Levi Leipheimer (USA)	Astana	+ 4' 55"
7	Stefano Garzelli (ITA)	Acqua & Sapone–Caffè Mokambo	+ 8' 48"
8	Michael Rogers (AUS)	Team Columbia–High Road	+ 9' 32"
DSQ	~~Tadej Valjavec (SLO)~~	~~Ag2r–La Mondiale~~	+ 10' 42"
10	Marzio Bruseghin (ITA)	Lampre–NGC	+ 11' 32"

== Stage 20 ==
30 May 2009 — Naples to Anagni, 203 km (126 mi)

This stage was flat, with only a climb to short elevation near the end. A preview predicted a sprint finish, but a late attack decided the stage.

Danilo Di Luca made it clear that he was aiming for the time bonuses available in this stage, both at the finish line and the intermediate sprint. As such, his team worked to bring the morning's breakaway back well before the end of the stage. Just as he had in the mountains, race leader Denis Menchov stayed right with Di Luca, and the two of them contested the intermediate sprint, with Di Luca's team trying to give him a successful leadout. They mistimed it, however, and Menchov was able to come around Di Luca and beat him to the line (Di Luca's teammate and accomplished sprinter Alessandro Petacchi managed to beat Menchov in the sprint to limit Di Luca's losses). Both Menchov and Di Luca got time bonuses, but Menchov got 4 for second in the sprint and Di Luca 2 for third, padding Menchov's lead in the overall classification.

The pace in the peloton was more lax after the intermediate sprint, and two riders came clear to form another breakaway. They were caught just before the first lap of the 18 km (11 mi) finishing circuit in Anagni. Another four riders tried to break away for the stage win, but they were caught during the second and final lap. With just over 1 km (0.62 mi) to go, Silence–Lotto rider Philippe Gilbert attacked and got a gap, staying away for the stage win. Thomas Voeckler tried to follow, but could not reach Gilbert's slipstream, finishing 2 seconds behind him. The peloton finished 7 seconds back.

Stage 20 result

	Rider	Team	Time
1	Philippe Gilbert (BEL)	Silence–Lotto	4h 30' 07"
2	Thomas Voeckler (FRA)	Bbox Bouygues Telecom	+ 2"
3	Stefano Garzelli (ITA)	Acqua & Sapone–Caffè Mokambo	+ 7"
4	Allan Davis (AUS)	Quick-Step	s.t.
5	Sébastien Hinault (FRA)	Ag2r–La Mondiale	s.t.
DSQ	~~Franco Pellizotti (ITA)~~	~~Liquigas~~	s.t.
7	Edvald Boasson Hagen (NOR)	Team Columbia–High Road	s.t.
8	Giovanni Visconti (ITA)	ISD	s.t.
9	Simon Gerrans (AUS)	Cervélo TestTeam	s.t.
10	Serge Pauwels (BEL)	Cervélo TestTeam	s.t.

General classification after stage 20

	Rider	Team	Time
1	Denis Menchov (RUS)	Rabobank	85h 44' 05"
DSQ	~~Danilo Di Luca (ITA)~~	~~LPR Brakes–Farnese Vini~~	+ 20"
DSQ	~~Franco Pellizotti (ITA)~~	~~Liquigas~~	+ 1' 43"
4	Carlos Sastre (ESP)	Cervélo TestTeam	+ 2' 44"
5	Ivan Basso (ITA)	Liquigas	+ 3' 37"
6	Levi Leipheimer (USA)	Astana	+ 4' 59"
7	Stefano Garzelli (ITA)	Acqua & Sapone–Caffè Mokambo	+ 8' 44"
8	Michael Rogers (AUS)	Team Columbia–High Road	+ 9' 36"
DSQ	~~Tadej Valjavec (SLO)~~	~~Ag2r–La Mondiale~~	+ 10' 46"
10	Marzio Bruseghin (ITA)	Lampre–NGC	+ 11' 36"

== Stage 21 ==
31 May 2009 — Rome, 14.4 km (8.9 mi) (individual time trial)

The 2009 Giro ended, as it had the previous year, with an individual time trial. The course was flat, though the road did twist in several places.

The winning time was set early on in the stage, by Cervélo TestTeam rider and reigning Lithuanian national time trial champion Ignatas Konovalovas. Konovalovas, the 79th man to leave the starthouse, was one of the last riders to take the course before it started to rain. Garmin's Bradley Wiggins started his ride not long after, and though he had the best time at the second and third intermediate time checks, he was slowed by the rain he encountered on the last part of the course as well as a stopped Bbox Bouygues Telecom team car attending to Matthieu Sprick, who had crashed.

The rainfall lightened almost as soon as it began, but the top riders in the general classification still faced a course made more difficult by the rain. Most of them rode conservatively, to keep their positions intact rather than aim for the stage win, but Danilo Di Luca did not. Di Luca attacked the course, riding with a high cadence from the outset. He had the best time at the first intermediate time check, but he lost energy and faded away as the course went on, finishing 45 seconds slower than the stage winner.

Giro champion Denis Menchov was the last man to take the course. The rain started again as he and Di Luca were the last ones on course. He was on pace to win the stage, but he dramatically crashed in the final kilometer, with his bike skidding well out in front of him on the wet cobbles. Support staff from his team car gave him a very quick bike change and he was back up in moments, finishing 24 seconds back on the stage to preserve his overall victory in the Giro.

Stage 21 result

	Rider	Team	Time
1	Ignatas Konovalovas (LTU)	Cervélo TestTeam	18' 42"
2	Bradley Wiggins (GBR)	Garmin–Slipstream	+ 1"
3	Edvald Boasson Hagen (NOR)	Team Columbia–High Road	+ 7"
4	Yaroslav Popovych (UKR)	Astana	+ 11"
5	Marzio Bruseghin (ITA)	Lampre–NGC	+ 16"
6	Giovanni Visconti (ITA)	ISD	+ 18"
7	Dries Devenyns (BEL)	Quick-Step	+ 20"
8	Maarten Tjallingii (NED)	Rabobank	+ 21"
9	Stefano Garzelli (ITA)	Acqua & Sapone–Caffè Mokambo	+ 23"
10	Denis Menchov (RUS)	Rabobank	+ 24"

Final General Classification

	Rider	Team	Time
1	Denis Menchov (RUS)	Rabobank	86h 03' 11"
DSQ	~~Danilo Di Luca (ITA)~~	~~LPR Brakes–Farnese Vini~~	+ 41"
DSQ	~~Franco Pellizotti (ITA)~~	~~Liquigas~~	+ 1' 59"
4	Carlos Sastre (ESP)	Cervélo TestTeam	+ 3' 46"
5	Ivan Basso (ITA)	Liquigas	+ 3' 59"
6	Levi Leipheimer (USA)	Astana	+ 5' 28"
7	Stefano Garzelli (ITA)	Acqua & Sapone–Caffè Mokambo	+ 8' 43"
8	Michael Rogers (AUS)	Team Columbia–High Road	+ 10' 01"
DSQ	~~Tadej Valjavec (SLO)~~	~~Ag2r–La Mondiale~~	+ 11' 13"
10	Marzio Bruseghin (ITA)	Lampre–NGC	+ 11' 28"
