= 2009 Giro d'Italia =

2009 UCI World Ranking, race 13 of 24
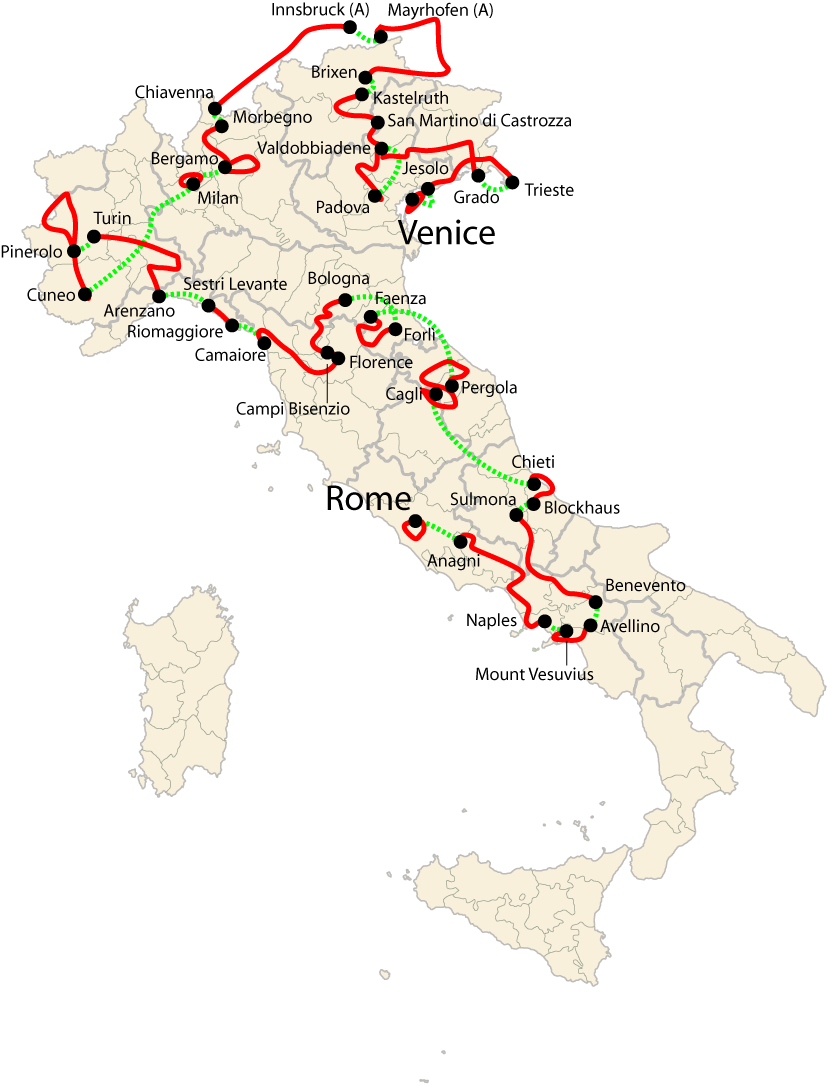
- Overview of the stages: route from Venice to Rome covered by the riders on the bicycle (red) and distances between stages (green).

Race details
- Dates: 9–31 May 2009
- Stages: 21
- Distance: 3,456.5 km (2,147.8 mi)
- Winning time: 86h 03' 11"

Results
Jersey awarded to the overall winner	Winner	Denis Menchov (RUS)	(Rabobank)
	Second	~~Danilo Di Luca~~; ~~Franco Pellizotti~~ Carlos Sastre (ESP)	(Cervélo TestTeam)
	Third	Ivan Basso (ITA)	(Liquigas)
Jersey awarded to the points classification winner	Points	~~Danilo Di Luca~~ Denis Menchov (RUS)	(Rabobank)
Jersey awarded to the mountains classification winner	Mountains	Stefano Garzelli (ITA)	(Acqua & Sapone–Caffè Mokambo)
Jersey awarded to the young rider classification winner	Young rider	Kevin Seeldraeyers (BEL)	(Quick-Step)
	Sprints	Giovanni Visconti (ITA)	(ISD)
Jersey awarded to the combativity classification winner	Combativity	Stefano Garzelli (ITA)	(Acqua & Sapone–Caffè Mokambo)
	Team	Astana	
	Team points	Team Columbia–High Road	

The 2009 Giro d'Italia was the 92nd running of the Giro d'Italia, one of cycling's Grand Tours. It was held from 9 to 31 May 2009, and marked the 100th year since the first edition of the race. Starting in Venice and finishing in Rome, 22 teams competed over 21 stages. Four of the top ten finishers in this edition later had their results voided.

The Giro was raced on a unique path through Italy, taking the peloton to some historic cities and towns in Italian cycling. Though the route lacked any well-known, storied climbs, the many intermediate and mountain stages in the second and third weeks of the race proved deceptively difficult. The 10th and the 16th stages were both called the race's queen stage, as both contained multiple difficult mountain climbs.

Riders protested during the ninth stage, a criterium in Milan. This protest was nominally about the overall safety conditions of the stage, and was sparked by life-threatening injuries sustained by Pedro Horrillo the day before. In the protest, riders declined to contest the stage except for a final sprint finish, a decision that proved controversial with race organizers and fans.

Denis Menchov won the race, having taken the lead in a long time trial in stage 12, and defended vigorously against attacks by his closest challenger, Danilo Di Luca, during the mountain stages of the final week. Di Luca came in second, 41 seconds behind the winner, and won the mauve jersey as points classification winner. Subsequent to the Giro, both he and third-place finisher Franco Pellizotti became embroiled in doping scandals, were given bans, and had their results stripped.

== Teams ==
Twenty-two teams were announced for the Giro. These included fifteen ProTour teams, and seven Professional Continental teams. Three ProTour teams did not wish to participate, and were thus not invited: Cofidis, Euskaltel–Euskadi, and Française des Jeux. Conversely, the organizers of the race originally declined to invite Fuji–Servetto, but changed this decision on 23 April, inviting them as the Giro's 22nd and final team. Each team sent a squad of nine riders, so the Giro began with a peloton of 198 cyclists.

The 22 teams that took part in the race were:

- Acqua & Sapone–Caffè Mokambo
- Ag2r–La Mondiale
- Astana
- Barloworld
- Bbox Bouygues Telecom
- Caisse d'Epargne
- Cervélo TestTeam
- Diquigiovanni–Androni
- Fuji–Servetto
- Garmin–Slipstream
- ISD
- Lampre–NGC
- Liquigas
- LPR Brakes–Farnese Vini
- Quick-Step
- Rabobank
- Silence–Lotto
- Team Columbia–High Road
- Team Katusha
- Team Milram
- Team Saxo Bank
- Xacobeo–Galicia

== Pre-race favorites ==
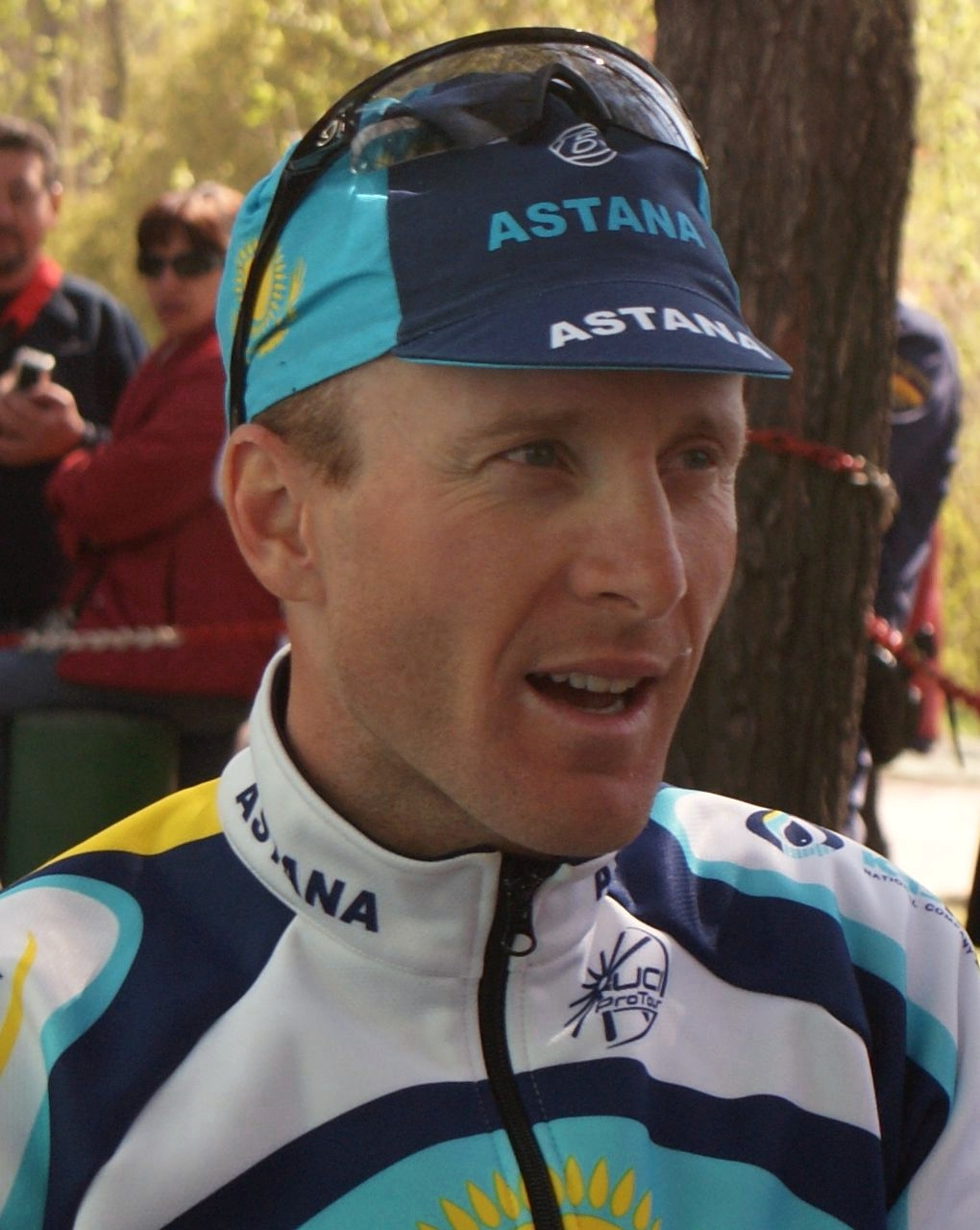
Levi Leipheimer was considered an overall favorite by writers and fellow cyclists alike.

The Astana team did not include 2008 race champion Alberto Contador, who chose not to defend his championship, but did include Lance Armstrong, who had recently returned from retirement. Though his appearance was put in doubt after he crashed out of stage 1 of the Vuelta a Castilla y León and broke his collarbone, Armstrong announced on 16 April that he would start the Giro despite undergoing surgery for his injury. Silence–Lotto star Cadel Evans was originally announced to be taking part in the Giro, but he publicly announced shortly afterward that he would not ride it, and accused RCS Sport (the organizers of the race) of using his name to promote the event. Contador and Evans both chose to focus on the Tour de France later in the season.

Many riders were named as contenders, including Ivan Basso, Levi Leipheimer, Armstrong, Damiano Cunego, Carlos Sastre, Gilberto Simoni, Danilo Di Luca, Marzio Bruseghin, and Denis Menchov. Before his collarbone injury, Armstrong was considered an overall favorite, and it was also noted that three time trials, including the insertion of an unusually long time trial mid-race, might favor him. Pre-race analysis noted that Armstrong, when on his best form, would be a rider very likely to gain from having such a long race against the clock included in the Giro.

Former winner Stefano Garzelli named Leipheimer as the favorite, as did some American media outlets. Armstrong considered Basso to be the favorite when speaking about the Giro in December 2008. Other news outlets also referred to Basso as the pre-race favorite.

Only a small number of stages were expected to end in a sprint, barring a successful breakaway. Sprinters in the event included Mark Cavendish, Alessandro Petacchi, Allan Davis, Filippo Pozzato, Robert Hunter, Robert Förster, Tyler Farrar, Juan José Haedo, and Oscar Gatto.

== Route and stages ==
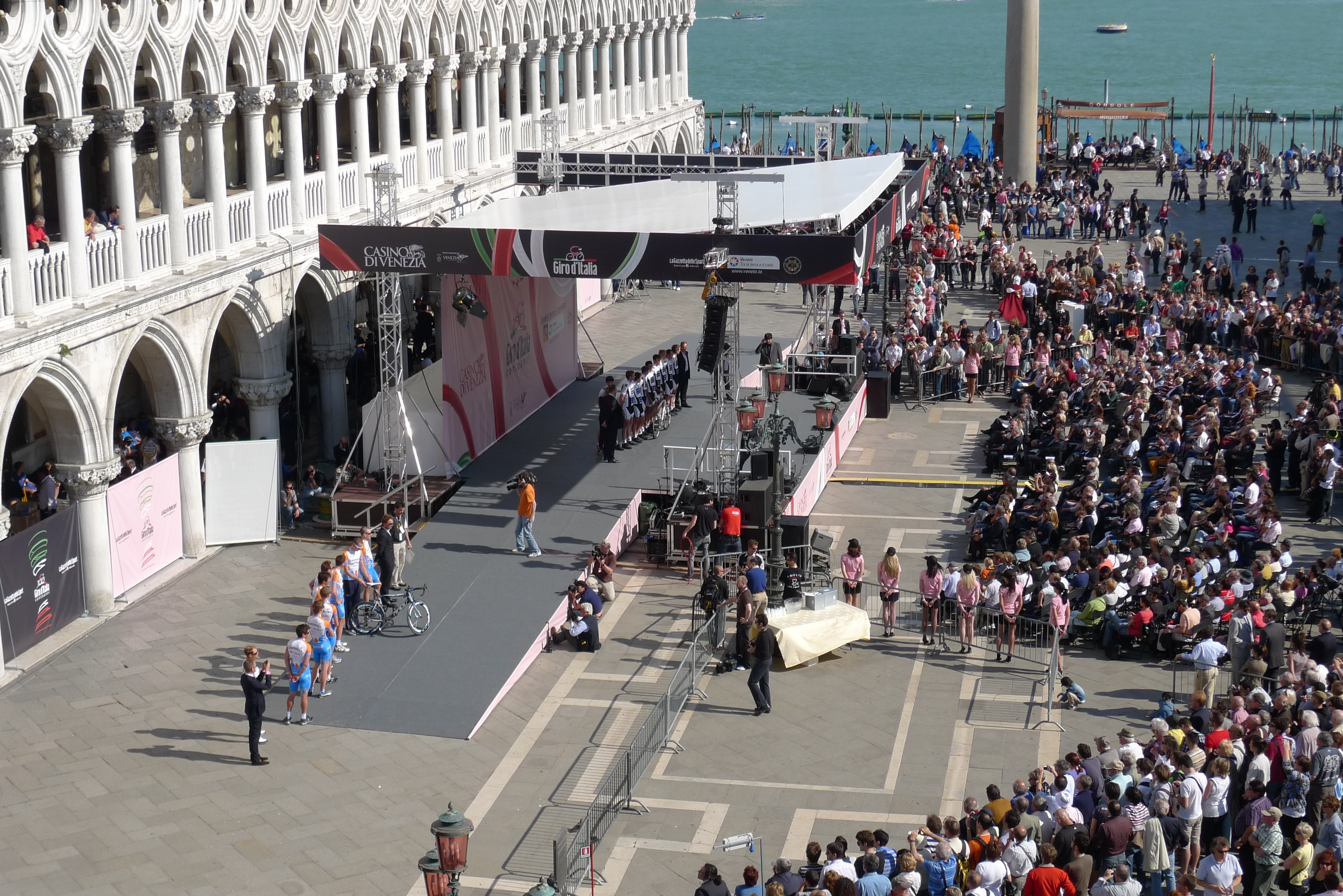
2009 Giro d'Italia teams presentation in Venice

The first Giro d'Italia was held in 1909, and the 2009 route was designed to commemorate the 100th anniversary, though interruptions due to World War I and World War II meant this was only the 92nd race. Milan, which had for years been the city in which the Giro concluded, was the site of a ten-lap criterium on the same circuit that began the first Giro d'Italia. Every city that hosted a stage start or finish in the first Giro was visited in 2009 with the exception of Genoa, although Arenzano (in the province of Genoa) hosted the finish to stage 11. The 11th stage also went over the Passo del Turchino, a climb used every year in the classic cycling race Milan–San Remo.

The tenth stage was planned to mimic stage 17 of the 1949 Giro d'Italia, which was won by Italian cycling legend Fausto Coppi en route to the overall victory. That route originally included the Col d'Izoard, a climb in France which has been featured in the Tour de France numerous times. Race organizers were forced to alter this stage to cover only the Italian side of the Alps rather than also visit France, as there were concerns over radio communication in the area, and the roads stood the risk of landslides. It was subsequently made longer than first planned, with an additional, shorter climb added. Stages 10 and 16, the latter of which went over Monte Petrano and two other first-category climbs, were both called the race's queen stage.

The route received a small amount of criticism for failing to include any well-known and especially difficult climbs such as the Passo del Mortirolo or Monte Zoncolan, instead including stages featuring multiple climbs with lesser ascents. Race director Angelo Zomegnan responded to the criticism by saying, "I won't follow the philosophy that the selection of climbs has to be determined by their names."

The 21 stages of the 2009 Giro d'Italia were divided into five categories: one team time trial, seven flat stages, four intermediate stages, seven mountain stages and two individual time trials. The type of stage together with the average speed of the winner decided how much time each cyclist would be allowed to finish that stage before being eliminated from the race.

Stage characteristics and winners
Stage	Date	Course	Distance	Type	Winner
1	9 May	Lido (Venice)	20.5 km (13 mi)	Team time trial	Team Columbia–High Road
2	10 May	Jesolo to Trieste	156 km (97 mi)	Flat stage	Alessandro Petacchi (ITA)
3	11 May	Grado to Valdobbiadene	198 km (123 mi)	Flat stage	Alessandro Petacchi (ITA)
4	12 May	Padua to San Martino di Castrozza	162 km (101 mi)	Mountain stage	Stefano Garzelli (ITA)
5	13 May	San Martino di Castrozza to Alpe di Siusi	125 km (78 mi)	Mountain stage	Denis Menchov (RUS)
6	14 May	Brixen to Mayrhofen, Austria	248 km (154 mi)	Intermediate stage	Michele Scarponi (ITA)
7	15 May	Innsbruck, Austria, to Chiavenna	244 km (152 mi)	Intermediate stage	Edvald Boasson Hagen (NOR)
8	16 May	Morbegno to Bergamo	209 km (130 mi)	Intermediate stage	Kanstantsin Sivtsov (BLR)
9	17 May	Milano Show 100; Milan - Milan	165 km (103 mi)	Flat stage	Mark Cavendish (GBR)
	18 May	Rest day			
10	19 May	Cuneo to Pinerolo	262 km (163 mi)	Mountain stage	~~Danilo Di Luca (ITA)~~
11	20 May	Turin to Arenzano	214 km (133 mi)	Flat stage	Mark Cavendish (GBR)
12	21 May	Sestri Levante to Riomaggiore	60.6 km (38 mi)	Individual time trial	Denis Menchov (RUS)
13	22 May	Lido di Camaiore to Florence	176 km (109 mi)	Flat stage	Mark Cavendish (GBR)
14	23 May	Campi Bisenzio to Bologna	172 km (107 mi)	Mountain stage	Simon Gerrans (AUS)
15	24 May	Forlì to Faenza	161 km (100 mi)	Intermediate stage	Leonardo Bertagnolli (ITA)
16	25 May	Pergola to Monte Petrano	237 km (147 mi)	Mountain stage	Carlos Sastre (ESP)
	26 May	Rest day			
17	27 May	Chieti to Blockhaus	83 km (52 mi)	Mountain stage	~~Franco Pellizotti (ITA)~~
18	28 May	Sulmona to Benevento	182 km (113 mi)	Flat stage	Michele Scarponi (ITA)
19	29 May	Avellino to Mount Vesuvius	164 km (102 mi)	Mountain stage	Carlos Sastre (ESP)
20	30 May	Naples to Anagni	203 km (126 mi)	Flat stage	Philippe Gilbert (BEL)
21	31 May	Rome	14.4 km (9 mi)	Individual time trial	Ignatas Konovalovas (LTU)
	Total		3,456.5 km (2,148 mi)		

== Race overview ==
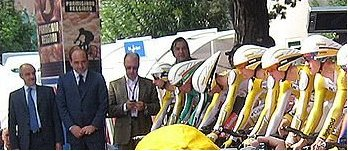
Team Columbia–High Road in the starthouse in Lido

The Giro began with a team time trial in Lido, a barrier island in the city of Venice. The starting order of the teams was decided by a random draw. Team Columbia–High Road, the first team to take the course, won the stage, giving their star sprinter Mark Cavendish the first pink jersey as leader of the race. Cavendish was defeated in a sprint finish the following day by Italian Alessandro Petacchi, who was riding for the LPR Brakes–Farnese Vini team. Petacchi became the next wearer of the pink jersey, after he won the Stage 3 sprint into Valdobbiadene. Cavendish went on to win three mass-start stages, but Team Columbia–High Road's success was not limited to Cavendish's victories nor the team time trial, as Edvald Boasson Hagen and Kanstantsin Sivtsov also took stage wins.

The first two high mountain stages of the Giro revealed the men who would battle for the overall race title. Danilo Di Luca of LPR Brakes–Farnese Vini took the win in Stage 4, and put himself just 2 seconds off the pink jersey. The next day, he claimed the jersey, when he was second to stage winner Denis Menchov at Alpe di Siusi as an elite group of favorites emerged including Menchov, Di Luca, and others who had performed well on the climb and were in high places in the overall standings.

Menchov was fifth after Alpe di Siusi, but rose to second before stage 12, the very long and hilly individual time trial in Cinque Terre. There, he claimed a convincing victory; only Levi Leipheimer finished within a minute of Menchov's winning time. Di Luca was nearly two minutes slower than him, finished sixth on the stage, and fell to second overall, with Menchov assuming the race lead. Di Luca tried repeatedly to shed Menchov during the remaining mountain stages to make up the time difference, which was never more than a minute. The two riders were involved in sprints for time bonuses at the finish line in stages 16 and 17, as well as an intermediate sprint in stage 20. Menchov was consistently quicker than Di Luca in these sprints. With his superior time-trial skills providing the difference in the final stage, the Russian was able to emerge as Giro champion, despite a dramatic fall in the final kilometre before the finish line.

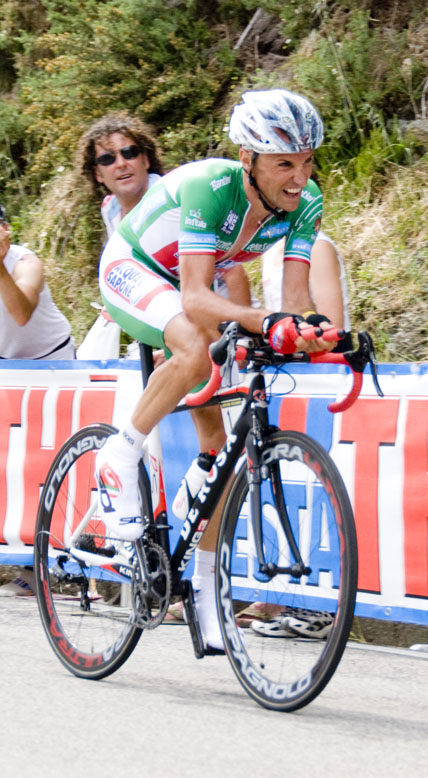
Stefano Garzelli wearing the green jersey as mountains classification leader

Stefano Garzelli was the winner of the mountains classification, gaining points for consistent high placings on the summit stage finishes, as well as a brief breakaway on the mountainous stage 10. The points classification was won by Di Luca, after he finished in the top ten in eight of the road stages. The youth classification was won by Kevin Seeldraeyers, who remained consistent after Thomas Lövkvist lost nearly 25 minutes on stage 16. Lövkvist had, for one day earlier in the race, led not just the youth but also the general classification.

Controversy arose during the ten-lap Milan criterium of the ninth stage, when the riders staged a protest over what they viewed as unsafe riding conditions in that stage and those that preceded it. The most visible cause for the protest was Rabobank rider Pedro Horrillo's accident during the eighth stage; Horrillo sustained numerous fractures and head injuries after tumbling over a barricade on the roadside while descending the Culmine di San Pietro. Horrillo fell more than 60 m (200 ft), and nearly died as a result of his injuries. After spending five weeks in hospitals in both Italy and his native Spain, Horrillo eventually recovered, though the day on the Culmine di San Pietro was his last as a professional cyclist, as he retired before the 2010 season began.

The protest at first only involved the criterium being neutralized – that is, the race director agreed that each rider would receive the same finishing time as the stage winner regardless of when they actually crossed the line. After the riders rode a lap of the course, they decided instead not to contest the stage at all, riding the first six circuits 20 km/h (12 mph) slower than previous stages. After four laps, they stopped altogether as race leader Di Luca addressed the unhappy crowd to explain their actions. The times for the stage did not count, and there was no aggressive riding until a final sprint finish. Along with Di Luca, Lance Armstrong was considered the principal voice speaking for the peloton on this day. Although the protest was referred to by some as "unanimous," cyclists such as Filippo Pozzato, who was himself bearing injuries sustained in a crash that would later force him to leave the race, said the riders had been too hasty in their decision, and that it should have been made conclusively before the stage began. Armstrong apologized to the fans for the effect the protest had on what was supposed to be a grand spectacle, but also contended that it was the correct decision for the peloton to make.

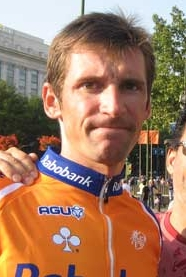
2009 Giro d'Italia champion Denis Menchov

Success in stages was limited to a few teams. Though there were nearly as many stages (21) as teams in the event (22), only eight teams ultimately came away with stage victories. Six different riders won multiple stages – Cavendish, Petacchi, Menchov, Di Luca, Carlos Sastre, and Michele Scarponi. Teammates of Sastre, Scarponi and Cavendish were also stage winners; Sastre's Cervélo TestTeam provided the winners to stages 14 (Simon Gerrans) and 21 (Ignatas Konovalovas), and Scarponi's teammate Leonardo Bertagnolli was the winner of stage 15. The only teams to be single stage winners were Liquigas with Franco Pellizotti in stage 17, and Silence–Lotto with classics specialist Philippe Gilbert three days later in a stage thought to resemble a classic. Pellizotti was also the third-place overall finisher. With wins for Quick Step's Seeldraeyers in the youth classification, Garzelli of Acqua & Sapone in the climbers' competition, and Astana in the Trofeo Fast Team ranking, 11 teams – half of the total entries – won significant prizes during the race.

=== Aftermath ===
About two months after the event concluded, on 22 July, it was announced that second place overall finisher and points classification winner Di Luca had given two positive tests for continuous erythropoietin receptor activator (CERA, an erythropoietin derivative) on 20 and 28 May, before the Cinque Terre time trial and the Mount Vesuvius stage in the race's final week. He was provisionally suspended with immediate effect by the Union Cycliste Internationale (UCI), cycling's governing body. It was announced on 8 August that the analyses of the B-samples from those controls confirmed the initial results, making it likely that Di Luca will be stripped of some or all of his results from the race. LPR Brakes–Farnese Vini fired him on 13 August. Di Luca at first maintained his innocence and claimed a conspiracy against him by the labs handling the tests. A period of legal maneuvering between Di Luca and the Italian National Olympic Committee (CONI) followed. CONI officials asked their anti-doping tribunal (TNA) to suspend Di Luca for three years – while two years is a customary ban for a doping positive, CONI prosecutors sought a third year for recidivism, stemming from Di Luca's previous doping incident two years earlier. He was given a two-year suspension, retroactive to July 2009, and indicated that he would appeal it to the Court of Arbitration for Sport. In October 2010, Di Luca was reinstated to active status by CONI, due to his cooperation with several ongoing doping investigations, though his results were indeed stricken from the record. On 10 January 2011, he signed with Team Katusha and indicated that he would return to the Giro in 2011 to support Katusha team leader Joaquim Rodríguez.

Five days before the start of the 2010 Giro d'Italia, 2009 podium finisher Pellizotti was identified as a rider of interest to the UCI's biological passport program due to irregular blood values. He was removed from his team's start list for the Giro and provisionally suspended. The UCI asked that CONI open disciplinary proceedings against him, which had no resolution until after the 2010 season finished. TNA cleared him on 21 October and declared him free to race, at which time the Liquigas team intended to re-sign him. The UCI decided in January 2011 to appeal his case to the CAS. The hearing was held in March, and Pellizotti asked for a quick resolution, with plans to return with Movistar Team in the 2011 Tirreno–Adriatico if he were cleared. The court reached its decision after five days, upholding the UCI's appeal, handing Pellizotti a two-year ban, and stripping all his results from this Giro and the 2009 Tour de France. Consequently, Pellizotti has said he is quitting the sport.

== Classification leadership ==
In the 2009 Giro d'Italia, four different jerseys were awarded. For the general classification, calculated by adding each cyclist's finishing times on each stage, and allowing time bonuses for the first three finishers on mass-start stages, the leader received a pink jersey. This classification is considered the most important of the Giro d'Italia, and the winner is considered the winner of the Giro.

Additionally, there was a points classification, which awarded a mauve jersey. In the points classification, cyclists got points for finishing in the top 15 in a stage. The stage win awarded 25 points, second place awarded 20 points, third 16, fourth 14, fifth 12, sixth 10, and one point fewer per place down the line, to a single point for 15th. In addition, points could be won in intermediate sprints.

There was also a mountains classification, which awarded a green jersey. In the mountains classifications, points were won by reaching the top of a mountain before other cyclists. Each climb was categorized as either first, second, or third category, with more points available for the higher-categorized climbs. The highest point in the Giro (called the Cima Coppi), which in 2009 was Sestrière in stage 10, afforded more points than the other first-category climbs.

The fourth jersey represented the young rider classification, which awarded a white jersey. This was decided the same way as the general classification, but only riders born after 1 January 1984 were eligible.

There were also two classifications for teams. The first was the Trofeo Fast Team. In this classification, the times of the best three cyclists per team on each stage were added; the leading team was the team with the lowest total time. The Trofeo Super Team was a team points classification, with the top 20 placed riders on each stage earning points (20 for first place, 19 for second place and so on, down to a single point for 20th) for their team.

The rows in the following table correspond to the jerseys awarded after that stage was run.

Stage	Winner	General classification	Points classification	Mountains classification	Young rider classification
1	Team Columbia–High Road	Mark Cavendish	no award	no award	Mark Cavendish
2	Alessandro Petacchi	Mark Cavendish	Alessandro Petacchi	David García	Mark Cavendish
3	Alessandro Petacchi	Alessandro Petacchi	Alessandro Petacchi	Mauro Facci	Tyler Farrar
4	~~Danilo Di Luca~~ Stefano Garzelli	Thomas Löfkvist	Alessandro Petacchi	~~Danilo Di Luca~~	Thomas Löfkvist
5	Denis Menchov	~~Danilo Di Luca~~	Alessandro Petacchi	~~Danilo Di Luca~~	Thomas Löfkvist
6	Michele Scarponi	~~Danilo Di Luca~~	~~Danilo Di Luca~~	~~Danilo Di Luca~~	Thomas Löfkvist
7	Edvald Boasson Hagen	~~Danilo Di Luca~~	~~Danilo Di Luca~~	~~Danilo Di Luca~~	Thomas Löfkvist
8	Kanstantsin Sivtsov	~~Danilo Di Luca~~	~~Danilo Di Luca~~	~~Danilo Di Luca~~	Thomas Löfkvist
9	Mark Cavendish	~~Danilo Di Luca~~	~~Danilo Di Luca~~	~~Danilo Di Luca~~	Thomas Löfkvist
10	~~Danilo Di Luca~~ Denis Menchov	~~Danilo Di Luca~~	~~Danilo Di Luca~~	Stefano Garzelli	Thomas Löfkvist
11	Mark Cavendish	~~Danilo Di Luca~~	~~Danilo Di Luca~~	Stefano Garzelli	Thomas Löfkvist
12	Denis Menchov	Denis Menchov	~~Danilo Di Luca~~	Stefano Garzelli	Thomas Löfkvist
13	Mark Cavendish	Denis Menchov	~~Danilo Di Luca~~	Stefano Garzelli	Thomas Löfkvist
14	Simon Gerrans	Denis Menchov	~~Danilo Di Luca~~	Stefano Garzelli	Thomas Löfkvist
15	~~Leonardo Bertagnolli~~	Denis Menchov	~~Danilo Di Luca~~	Stefano Garzelli	Thomas Löfkvist
16	Carlos Sastre	Denis Menchov	~~Danilo Di Luca~~	Stefano Garzelli	Kevin Seeldraeyers
17	~~Franco Pellizotti~~ Stefano Garzelli	Denis Menchov	~~Danilo Di Luca~~	Stefano Garzelli	Kevin Seeldraeyers
18	Michele Scarponi	Denis Menchov	~~Danilo Di Luca~~	Stefano Garzelli	Kevin Seeldraeyers
19	Carlos Sastre	Denis Menchov	~~Danilo Di Luca~~	Stefano Garzelli	Kevin Seeldraeyers
20	Philippe Gilbert	Denis Menchov	~~Danilo Di Luca~~	Stefano Garzelli	Kevin Seeldraeyers
21	Ignatas Konovalovas	Denis Menchov	~~Danilo Di Luca~~	Stefano Garzelli	Kevin Seeldraeyers
Final		Denis Menchov	~~Danilo Di Luca~~ Denis Menchov	Stefano Garzelli	Kevin Seeldraeyers

== Final standings ==
Legend
A pink jersey	Denotes the winner of the General classification	A green jersey	Denotes the winner of the Mountains classification
A violet jersey	Denotes the winner of the Points classification	A white jersey	Denotes the winner of the Young rider classification

=== General classification ===
	Rider	Team	Time
1	Denis Menchov (RUS)	Rabobank	86h 03' 11"
DSQ	~~Danilo Di Luca (ITA)~~	LPR Brakes–Farnese Vini	+ 0' 41"
DSQ	~~Franco Pellizotti (ITA)~~	Liquigas	+ 1' 59"
2	Carlos Sastre (ESP)	Cervélo TestTeam	+ 3' 46"
3	Ivan Basso (ITA)	Liquigas	+ 3' 59"
4	Levi Leipheimer (USA)	Astana	+ 5' 28"
5	Stefano Garzelli (ITA)	Acqua & Sapone–Caffè Mokambo	+ 8' 43"
6	Michael Rogers (AUS)	Team Columbia–High Road	+ 10' 01"
DSQ	~~Tadej Valjavec (SLO)~~	Ag2r–La Mondiale	+11' 13"
7	Marzio Bruseghin (ITA)	Lampre–NGC	+ 11' 28"
8	David Arroyo (ESP)	Caisse d'Epargne	+ 12' 50"
DSQ	~~Lance Armstrong (USA)~~	Astana	+ 15' 59"

=== Mountains classification ===
	Rider	Team	Points
1	Stefano Garzelli (ITA)	Acqua & Sapone–Caffè Mokambo	61
DSQ	~~Danilo Di Luca (ITA)~~	LPR Brakes–Farnese Vini	45
3	Denis Menchov (RUS)	Rabobank	41
4	Andriy Hryvko (UKR)	ISD	40
DSQ	~~Franco Pellizotti (ITA)~~	Liquigas	38
6	Carlos Sastre (ESP)	Cervélo TestTeam	30
7	Michele Scarponi (ITA)	Diquigiovanni–Androni	24
8	Giovanni Visconti (ITA)	ISD	24
9	Simon Gerrans (AUS)	Cervélo TestTeam	15
10	Damiano Cunego (ITA)	Lampre–NGC	14

=== Points classification ===
	Rider	Team	Points
DSQ	~~Danilo Di Luca (ITA)~~	LPR Brakes–Farnese Vini	170
1	Denis Menchov (RUS)	Rabobank	144
DSQ	~~Franco Pellizotti (ITA)~~	Liquigas	133
4	Stefano Garzelli (ITA)	Acqua & Sapone–Caffè Mokambo	133
5	Alessandro Petacchi (ITA)	LPR Brakes–Farnese Vini	104
6	Edvald Boasson Hagen (NOR)	Team Columbia–High Road	103
7	Carlos Sastre (ESP)	Cervélo TestTeam	86
8	Allan Davis (AUS)	Quick-Step	82
9	Ivan Basso (ITA)	Liquigas	74
10	Levi Leipheimer (USA)	Astana	70

=== Young rider classification ===
	Rider	Team	Time
1	Kevin Seeldraeyers (BEL)	Quick-Step	86h 19' 26"
2	Francesco Masciarelli (ITA)	Acqua & Sapone–Caffè Mokambo	+ 2' 55"
3	Francis De Greef (BEL)	Silence–Lotto	+ 17' 03"
4	Thomas Löfkvist (SWE)	Team Columbia–High Road	+ 31' 45"
5	Jackson Rodríguez (VEN)	Diquigiovanni–Androni	+ 34' 37"
6	Andrey Zeits (KAZ)	Astana	+ 58' 41"
7	Chris Froome (GBR)	Barloworld	+ 59' 06"
8	Marcos García (ESP)	Xacobeo–Galicia	+ 1h 26' 10"
9	Arnold Jeannesson (FRA)	Caisse d'Epargne	+ 1h 41' 55"
10	Dario Cataldo (ITA)	Quick-Step	+ 1h 44' 09"

=== Trofeo Fast Team classification ===
	Team	Time
1	Astana	257h 48' 40"
2	Team Columbia–High Road	+ 24' 15"
3	Diquigiovanni–Androni	+ 27' 17"
4	Liquigas	+ 32' 21"
5	Lampre–NGC	+ 58' 58"
6	Caisse d'Epargne	+ 1h 10' 52"
7	Cervélo TestTeam	+ 1h 16' 23"
8	Acqua & Sapone–Caffè Mokambo	+ 1h 18' 52"
9	Rabobank	+ 1h 51' 45"
10	LPR Brakes–Farnese Vini	+ 1h 53' 34"

=== Trofeo Super Team classification ===
	Team	Points
1	Team Columbia–High Road	400
2	LPR Brakes–Farnese Vini	314
3	Liquigas	302
4	Diquigiovanni–Androni	273
5	Astana	269
6	Lampre–NGC	262
7	Cervélo TestTeam	228
8	Acqua & Sapone–Caffè Mokambo	228
9	Quick-Step	220
10	Rabobank	199

=== Minor classifications ===
Other less well-known classifications, whose leaders did not receive a special jersey, were awarded during the Giro. These awards were based on points earned throughout the three weeks of the tour.

Each mass-start stage had one intermediate sprint, the Traguardo Volante, or TV. The TV gave bonus seconds towards the general classification, points towards the regular points classification, and also points towards the TV classification. This award was known in previous years as the "Intergiro" and the "Expo Milano 2015" classification. It was won by Italian Giovanni Visconti, of ISD.

Other awards included the Combativity classification, which was a compilation of points gained for position on crossing intermediate sprints, mountain passes and stage finishes. Mountains classification winner Stefano Garzelli won this award.

The Azzurri d'Italia classification was based on finishing order, but points were awarded only to the top three finishers in each stage. It was won, like the closely associated points classification, by Danilo Di Luca.

Additionally, the Trofeo Fuga Cervelo rewarded riders who took part in a breakaway at the head of the field, each rider in an escape of ten or fewer riders getting one point for each kilometre that the group stayed clear. Quick-Step's Mauro Facci was first in this competition.

Teams were given penalty points for minor technical infringements. Silence–Lotto and Quick-Step were most successful in avoiding penalties, and so shared leadership of the Fair Play classification.

=== World Rankings points ===
The Giro was one of 24 events throughout the season that contributed points towards the 2009 UCI World Ranking. Points were awarded to the top 20 finishers overall, and to the top five finishers in each stage.

Points earned in the Giro d'Italia
Name	Team	Points
Denis Menchov (RUS)	Rabobank	218
~~Danilo Di Luca (ITA)~~	~~LPR Brakes–Farnese Vini~~	~~186~~
~~Franco Pellizotti (ITA)~~	~~Liquigas~~	~~138~~
Carlos Sastre (ESP)	Cervélo TestTeam	124
Ivan Basso (ITA)	Liquigas	86
Stefano Garzelli (ITA)	Acqua & Sapone–Caffè Mokambo	85
Levi Leipheimer (USA)	Astana	79
Mark Cavendish (GBR)	Team Columbia–High Road	56
Michael Rogers (AUS)	Team Columbia–High Road	54

Alessandro Petacchi (ITA)	LPR Brakes–Farnese Vini	45
~~Tadej Valjavec (SLO)~~	~~Ag2r–La Mondiale~~	~~44~~
Marzio Bruseghin (ITA)	Lampre–NGC	39
Edvald Boasson Hagen (NOR)	Team Columbia–High Road	36
David Arroyo (ESP)	Caisse d'Epargne	33
Michele Scarponi (ITA)	Diquigiovanni–Androni	32
Kanstantsin Siutsou (BLR)	Team Columbia–High Road	26
Lance Armstrong (USA)	Astana	26
Allan Davis (AUS)	Quick-Step	22
Tyler Farrar (USA)	Garmin–Slipstream	22
José Serpa (COL)	Diquigiovanni–Androni	22
Kevin Seeldraeyers (BEL)	Quick-Step	18
Philippe Gilbert (BEL)	Silence–Lotto	16
Simon Gerrans (AUS)	Cervélo TestTeam	16
Leonardo Bertagnolli (ITA)	Diquigiovanni–Androni	16
Ignatas Konovalovas (LTU)	Cervélo TestTeam	16
Yaroslav Popovych (UKR)	Astana	16
Robert Hunter (RSA)	Barloworld	10
Thomas Voeckler (FRA)	Bbox Bouygues Telecom	8
Bradley Wiggins (GBR)	Garmin–Slipstream	8
Francesco Gavazzi (ITA)	Lampre–NGC	8
Rubens Bertogliati (SUI)	Diquigiovanni–Androni	8
Janez Brajkovič (SLO)	Astana	8
Félix Cárdenas (COL)	Barloworld	8
Francesco Masciarelli (ITA)	Acqua & Sapone–Caffè Mokambo	8
Serge Pauwels (BEL)	Cervélo TestTeam	8
Lars Bak (DEN)	Team Saxo Bank	6
Damiano Cunego (ITA)	Lampre–NGC	5
Thomas Lövkvist (SWE)	Team Columbia–High Road	4
Ben Swift (GBR)	Team Katusha	4
Marco Pinotti (ITA)	Team Columbia–High Road	4
Pavel Brutt (RUS)	Team Katusha	4
Danny Pate (USA)	Garmin–Slipstream	4
Matthew Goss (AUS)	Team Saxo Bank	3
Filippo Pozzato (ITA)	Team Katusha	2
Dario Cataldo (ITA)	Quick-Step	2
Sébastien Hinault (FRA)	Ag2r–La Mondiale	2
Evgeni Petrov (RUS)	Team Katusha	2
Mauricio Soler (COL)	Barloworld	2
Davide Viganò (ITA)	Fuji–Servetto	2
Alessandro Bertolini (ITA)	Diquigiovanni–Androni	1
Philip Deignan (IRE)	Cervélo TestTeam	1
Dmytro Grabovskyy (UKR)	ISD	1
Marco Marzano (ITA)	Lampre–NGC	1
Gilberto Simoni (ITA)	Diquigiovanni–Androni	1

Top ten of the individual standings after the Giro d'Italia
Rank	Prev.	Name	Team	Points
1	—	Denis Menchov (RUS)	Rabobank	218
2	5	Allan Davis (AUS)	Quick-Step	205
3	1	Heinrich Haussler (GER)	Cervélo TestTeam	197
4	2	Davide Rebellin (ITA)	Diquigiovanni–Androni	194
5	3	Alejandro Valverde (ESP)	Caisse d'Epargne	188
6	4	Alberto Contador (ESP)	Astana	188
7	127	~~Danilo Di Luca (ITA)~~	~~LPR Brakes–Farnese Vini~~	~~188~~
8	6	Philippe Gilbert (BEL)	Silence–Lotto	187
9	27	Stefano Garzelli (ITA)	Acqua & Sapone–Caffè Mokambo	170
10	7	Luis León Sánchez (ESP)	Caisse d'Epargne	169
