= Tour de Savoie Mont-Blanc =

French multi-day road cycling race

Race details
- Date: June
- Region: Savoie and Haute-Savoie
- Discipline: Road race
- Competition: UCI Europe Tour
- Type: Stage race (until 2022); One-day race (2022)
- Organiser: Chambery Cycling Organization (to 2020); PMC Consultant (from 2020)
- Web site: tourdespaysdesavoie.com

History
- First edition: 1999
- Editions: 24 (as of 2022)
- First winner: Christian Milesi (FRA)
- Most wins: Matthieu Sprick (FRA) (2 wins)
- Most recent: Matthew Dinham (AUS)

The Tour de Savoie Mont-Blanc was a multi-day cycling race held annually in the departments of Savoie and Haute-Savoie in France between 1999 and 2021. It was held as part of the UCI Europe Tour, as a category 2.2 race.

After its 2021 edition, the Tour de Savoie Mont-Blanc was superseded by the La Maurienne Classic one-day race, to be held for the first time in August 2022.

== Winners ==
Year	Country	Rider	Team
1999	France	Christian Milesi	
2000	France	Christophe Edaleine	
2001	France	Florian Germain	
2002	France	Matthieu Sprick	SC Sarreguemines
2003	France	Matthieu Sprick	Vendée U-Pays de la Loire
2004	France	Rémi Pauriol	Vélo-Club La Pomme Marseille
2005	France	Blaise Sonnery	Chambéry Cyclisme Formation
2006	France	Jean-Charles Sénac	Chambéry Cyclisme Formation
2007	Ireland	Dan Martin	Vélo-Club La Pomme Marseille
2008	France	Guillaume Bonnafond	Ag2r–La Mondiale
2009	Luxembourg	Ben Gastauer	Chambéry Cyclisme Formation
2010	Switzerland	Nicolas Schnyder	Price Your Bike
2011	Russia	Nikita Novikov	Itera–Katusha
2012	France	Stéphane Rossetto	Cyclo-club de Nogent-sur-Oise
2013	France	Yoann Barbas	Armée de Terre
2014	Belgium	Louis Vervaeke	Lotto–Belisol U23
2015	Spain	David Belda	Burgos BH
2016	Spain	Enric Mas	Klein Constantia
2017	Colombia	Egan Bernal	Androni–Sidermec–Bottecchia
2018	Austria	Riccardo Zoidl	Team Felbermayr–Simplon Wels
2019	Australia	Chris Harper	Team BridgeLane
2020	France	Pierre Rolland	B&B Hotels–Vital Concept
2021	Ecuador	Jefferson Alexander Cepeda	Androni Giocattoli–Sidermec

=== La Maurienne ===
Year	Country	Rider	Team
2022	Australia	Matthew Dinham	Team BridgeLane
