= Jean-Charles Sénac =

French cyclist

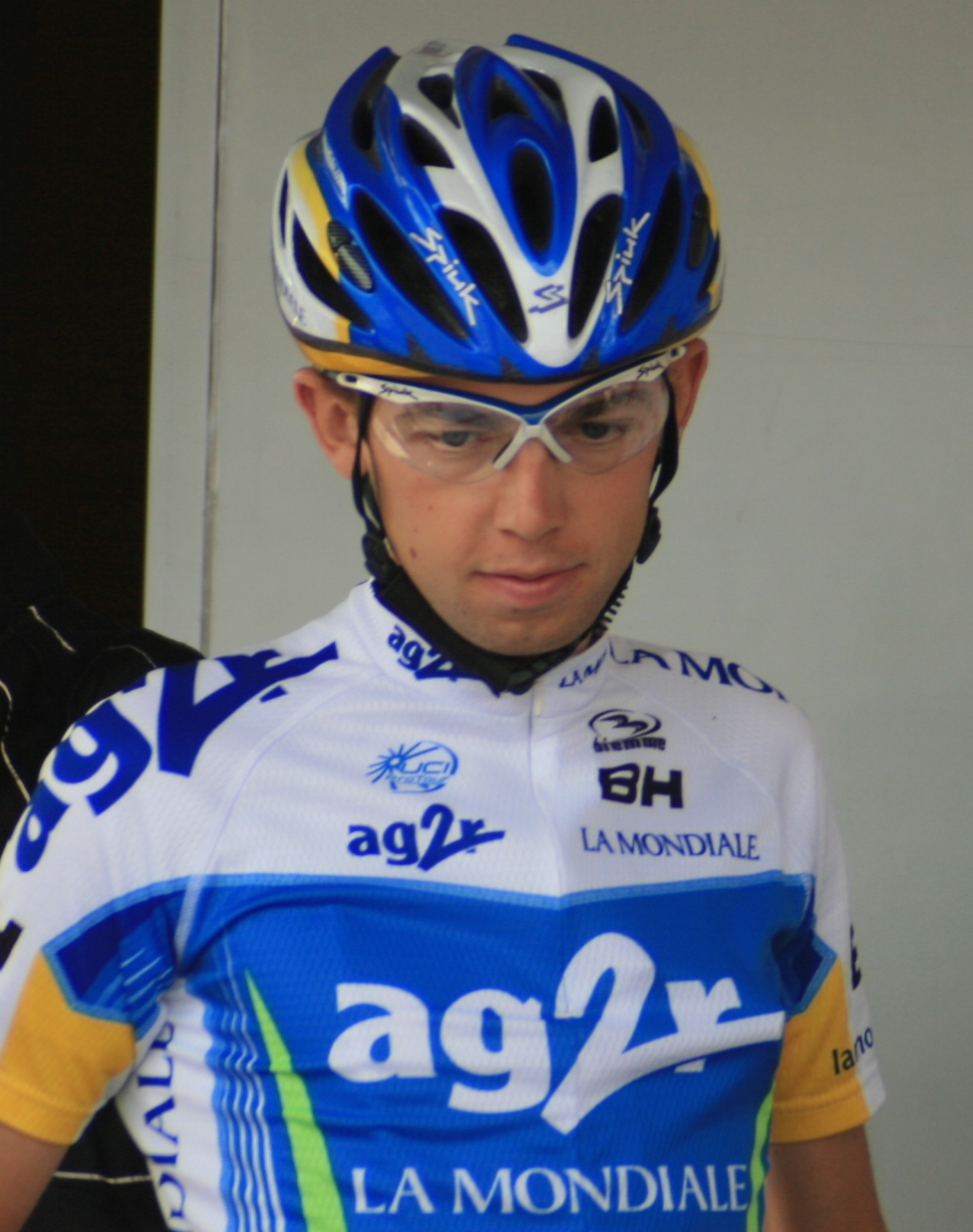

Personal information
- Full name: Jean-Charles Sénac
- Born: 23 May 1985 (age 41) Chambéry, France

Cycling career
- Sport: Cycling
- Discipline: Road
- Role: Rider

Professional team
- 2008–2009: Ag2r–La Mondiale

Jean-Charles Sénac (born 23 May 1985 in Chambéry) is a French road bicycle racer.

== Professional Team ==
He rode for UCI ProTour team Ag2r–La Mondiale.

== Palmares ==
2006
1st, Overall, Tour des Pays de Savoie

Winner Stage 4

2007
2nd, National Amateur Road Race Championship
