= Andrea Masciarelli =

Italian cyclist

Personal information
- Born: 2 September 1982 (age 44) Pescara, Italy

Cycling career
- Sport: Cycling
- Discipline: Road
- Role: Rider

Professional teams
- 2003-2004: Vini Caldirola
- 2005-2012: Acqua & Sapone
- 2013: Utensilnord

Andrea Masciarelli (born 2 September 1982) is an Italian cyclist. He rode in the 2009 Giro d'Italia and 2010 Giro d'Italia.

== Palmares ==
2008
3rd Giro del Veneto
