= Evgeny Sokolov =

Russian road bicycle racer (born 1984)

Personal information
- Full name: Evgeny Sokolov
- Born: 11 June 1984 (age 42) Moscow, Soviet Union

Cycling career
- Sport: Cycling
- Discipline: Road
- Role: Rider

Amateur team
- 2005: Omnibike Dynamo Moscow

Professional team
- 2008–2009: Bouygues Télécom

Evgeny Sokolov (born 11 June 1984) is a Russian road bicycle racer who last rode for UCI ProTour team Bbox Bouygues Telecom.

== Palmares ==
2005
3rd, Overall, Five Rings of Moscow
3rd, Overall, Tour de Gironde
2006
Russia U23 Road Race Champion
3rd, Overall, La Tropicale Amissa Bongo
3rd, Overall, Circuit de Saône-et-Loire

Winner Stage 4

3rd, Overall, Bidasoa Itzulia

Winner Stage 1

2007
1st, Overall, Bordeaux-Saintes

Winner Stage 1

1st, Les Boucles du Sud Ardèche
