= Héctor González Baeza =

Spanish cyclist

Héctor González
Personal information
- Full name: Héctor González Baeza
- Born: 16 March 1986 (age 40) Barakaldo, Spain

Cycling career
- Sport: Cycling
- Discipline: Road
- Role: Rider

Amateur teams
- 2006: Saunier Duval–Prodir (under-23)
- 2007: Saunier Duval–Prodir (stagiaire)
- 2010–2011: Heraklion Kastro-Murcia

Professional team
- 2008–2009: Saunier Duval–Scott

Héctor González Baeza (born 16 March 1986 in Barakaldo, Spain) is a Spanish professional road racing cyclist.

== Palmarès ==
2004
2nd, National U19 Time Trial Championship
3rd, National U19 Road Race Championship
2006
1st, Stage 2, Bidasoa Itzulia
1st, Stage 4, Bizkaiko Bira
2007
3rd, National U23 Time Trial Championship
