= Blaise Sonnery =

French cyclist

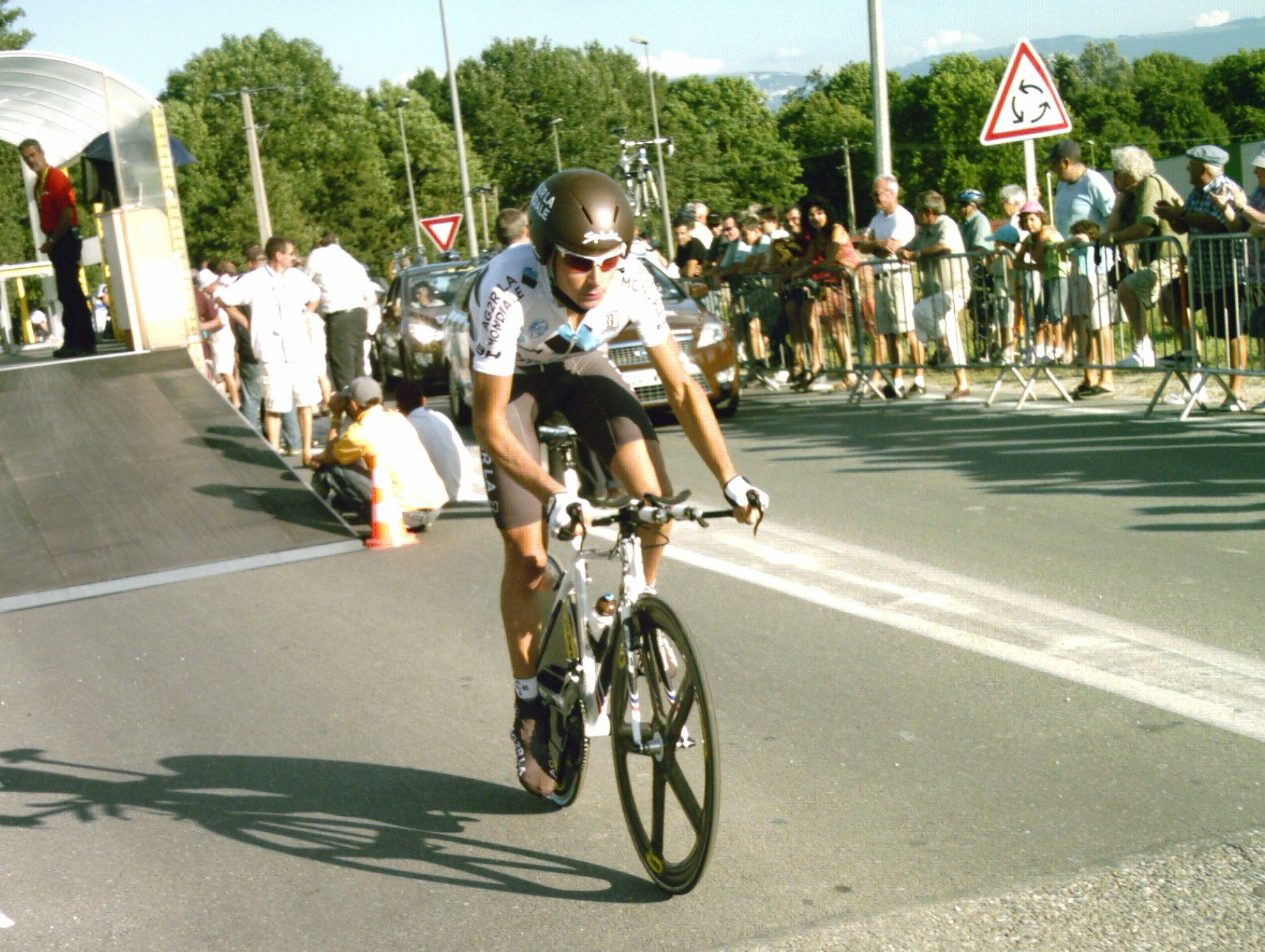

Personal information
- Full name: Blaise Sonnery
- Born: 21 March 1985 (age 41) L'Arbresle, France
- Height: 1.75 m (5 ft 9 in)
- Weight: 60 kg (130 lb)

Cycling career
- Sport: Cycling
- Discipline: Road
- Role: Rider

Amateur teams
- 2005–2006: Chambéry CF
- 2005: AG2R Prévoyance (stagiaire)
- 2010: Creusot Cyclisme
- 2011: VC Caladois
- 2013: VC Caladois
- 2014–2015: Bourg-en-Bresse Ain

Professional teams
- 2007–2009: AG2R Prévoyance
- 2012: Bridgestone–Anchor

Blaise Sonnery (born 21 March 1985 in L'Arbresle, Rhône) is a French former professional road bicycle racer who previously rode for UCI ProTour team Ag2r–La Mondiale.

== Major results ==
2003
1st Overall Tour des Pays de Savoie

1st Stage 3

2005
3rd Overall Ronde de l'Isard
2006
3rd Road race, National Under-23 Road Championships
3rd Overall Ronde de l'Isard

1st Stage 5

3rd Overall Tour des Pays de Savoie
2009
8th Tour du Doubs
2012
8th Overall Tour of Japan
