= Leonardo Scarselli =

Italian cyclist

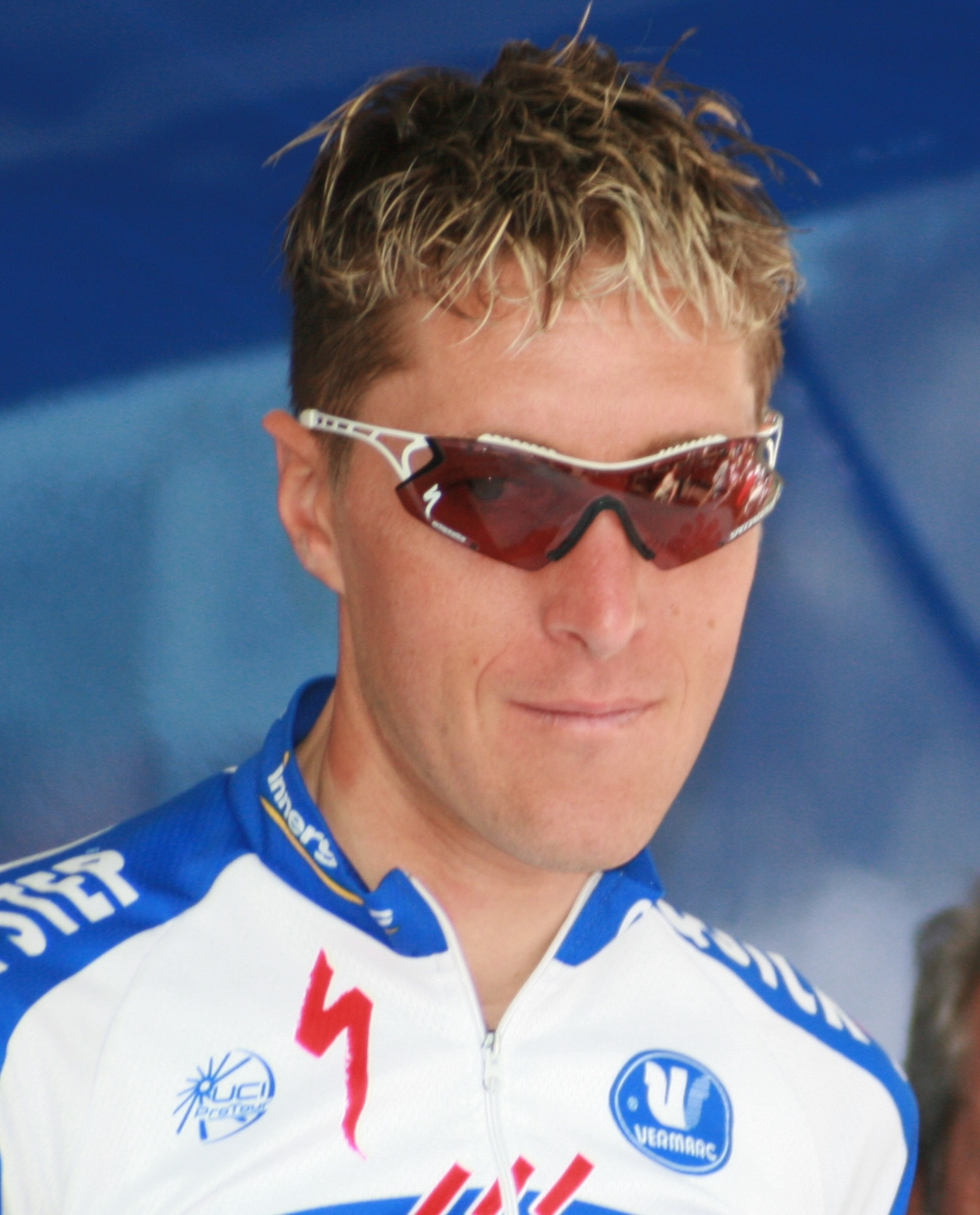

Personal information
- Full name: Leonardo Scarselli
- Born: 29 April 1975 (age 51) Florence, Italy

Cycling career
- Sport: Cycling
- Current team: Vini Zabù
- Discipline: Road
- Role: Rider

Professional teams
- 2000: Aguardiente Néctar-Selle Italia
- 2001: Selle Italia - Pacific
- 2002–2005: Colombia - Selle Italia
- 2006–2008: Quick-Step–Innergetic
- 2009–: ISD

Leonardo Scarselli (born 29 April 1975 in Florence) is an Italian professional road bicycle racer for UCI Professional Continental cycling team Vini Zabù.

== Palmares ==
- Tour du Sénégal - Overall (2003)
  - 2 stages (2002)
