= Francesco Masciarelli =

Italian cyclist

Personal information
- Full name: Francesco Masciarelli
- Born: 5 May 1986 (age 40) Pescara, Italy

Cycling career
- Sport: Cycling
- Discipline: Road
- Role: Rider

Professional teams
- 2005: →Acqua & Sapone–Adria Mobil (stagiaire)
- 2006: →Acqua & Sapone (stagiaire)
- 2007–2010: Acqua & Sapone–Caffè Mokambo
- 2011–2012: Astana

Francesco Masciarelli (born 5 May 1986 in Pescara) is an Italian professional road bicycle racer, who last rode for the Astana team. He is the son of former racing cyclist Palmiro Masciarelli and brother of fellow racing cyclists Simone Masciarelli and Andrea Masciarelli.

== Major results ==
2007
1st, Overall, Tour of Japan

1st, Stage 3
1st, Stage 5

2008
1st, Giro del Lazio

2010
Tour Méditerranéen

1st, Stage 5
