= Mauro Facci =

Italian cyclist

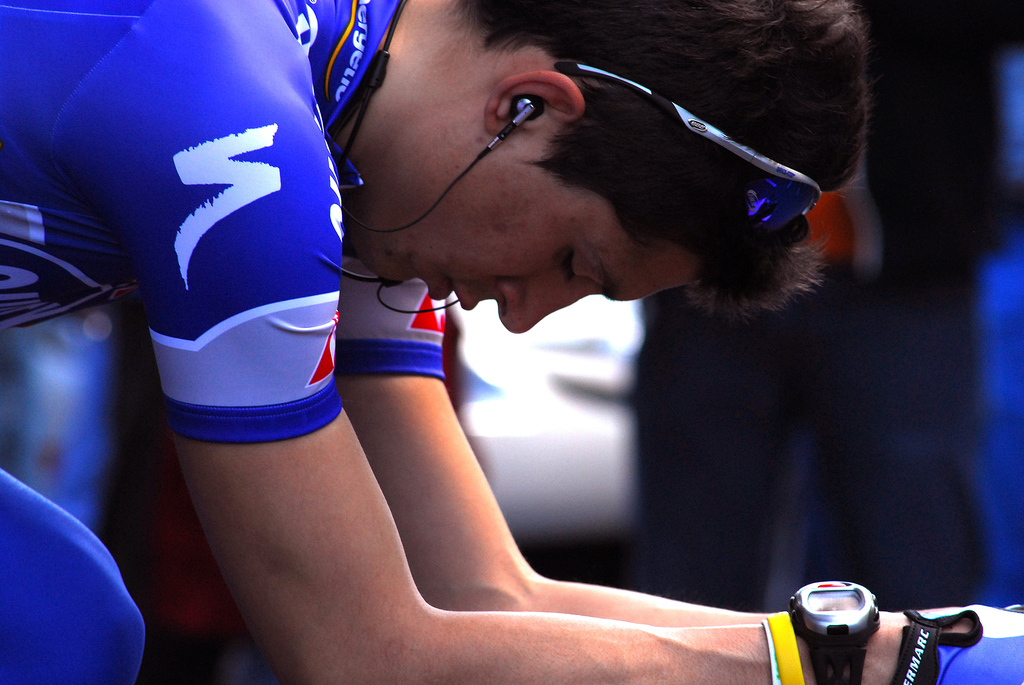

Personal information
- Full name: Mauro Facci
- Born: 11 May 1982 (age 44) Vicenza, Italy
- Height: 1.82 m (6 ft 0 in)
- Weight: 68 kg (150 lb)

Cycling career
- Sport: Cycling
- Discipline: Road
- Role: Rider

Professional teams
- 2002–2005: Fassa Bortolo
- 2006: Barloworld
- 2007–2010: Quick-Step–Innergetic

Mauro Facci (born 11 May 1982 in Vicenza) is a former Italian professional road bicycle racer, who competed between 2002 and 2010.

== Major results ==
2004
Coppi e Bartali – Team Time Trial
2005
Coppi e Bartali – Team Time Trial

== Tour de France results ==
- 2005 – 144th

== Notes and references ==
- Mauro Facci at Cycling Archives (archive)
