= 2010 Française des Jeux season =

2010 Française des Jeux season
Manager	Marc Madiot
One-day victories	2
Stage race overall victories	1
Stage race stage victories	13
Previous season • Next season

The 2010 season for the Française des Jeux cycling team began in January with the Tour Down Under and ended in October at the Chrono des Nations. As a UCI ProTour team, they were automatically invited and obligated to send a squad to every ProTour event.

Personnel-wise, the team was mostly unchanged from the 2009 season. Its manager, as it has been since its inception in 1997, was former cyclist Marc Madiot.

On 2 July, the eve of the Tour de France, the team announced that the French national lottery would extend its sponsorship of the team for four years, and the team would immediately change its name to FDJ. For the 2011 season, the team will ride as a UCI Professional Continental team. Only the top 20 teams from 2010 in the UCI's points system were eligible for ProTeam status, and FDJ finished 21st in that ranking.

== 2010 roster ==
Ages as of January 1, 2010.

Rider	Date of birth
Olivier Bonnaire (FRA)	March 2, 1983 (aged 26)
Sandy Casar (FRA)	February 2, 1979 (aged 30)
Pierre Cazaux (FRA)	June 7, 1984 (aged 25)
Sébastien Chavanel (FRA)	March 21, 1981 (aged 28)
Mikaël Cherel (FRA)	March 17, 1986 (aged 23)
Rémy Di Gregorio (FRA)	July 31, 1985 (aged 24)
Arnaud Gérard (FRA)	October 6, 1984 (aged 25)
Anthony Geslin (FRA)	June 9, 1980 (aged 29)
Timothy Gudsell (NZL)	February 17, 1984 (aged 25)
Frédéric Guesdon (FRA)	October 14, 1971 (aged 38)
Yauheni Hutarovich (BLR)	November 29, 1983 (aged 26)
Mathieu Ladagnous (FRA)	December 12, 1984 (aged 25)

Rider	Date of birth
Christophe Le Mével (FRA)	September 11, 1980 (aged 29)
Gianni Meersman (BEL)	December 5, 1985 (aged 24)
Francis Mourey (FRA)	December 8, 1980 (aged 29)
Yoann Offredo (FRA)	November 12, 1986 (aged 23)
Thibaut Pinot (FRA)	May 29, 1990 (aged 19)
Anthony Roux (FRA)	April 18, 1987 (aged 22)
Jérémy Roy (FRA)	June 22, 1983 (aged 26)
Wesley Sulzberger (AUS)	October 20, 1986 (aged 23)
Benoît Vaugrenard (FRA)	January 5, 1982 (aged 27)
Jussi Veikkanen (FIN)	March 29, 1981 (aged 28)
Arthur Vichot (FRA)	November 26, 1988 (aged 21)

Riders who joined the team for the 2010 season

Rider	2009 team
Olivier Bonnaire	Bbox Bouygues Telecom
Pierre Cazaux	Roubaix Lille Métropole
Thibaut Pinot	neo-pro
Arthur Vichot	neo-pro

Riders who left the team during or after the 2009 season

Rider	2010 team
Jérôme Coppel	Saur–Sojasun
Sébastien Joly	Saur–Sojasun
Guillaume Levarlet	Saur–Sojasun

== Stage races ==
The team scored three victories at the Tour Méditerranéen, with Hutarovich in stages 1 and 3 and Veikkanen in stage 2. Veikkanen's stage win gave him the overall race lead, but he was unable to hold it through the conclusion of the race, losing it on the final day to Alejandro Valverde. Française des Jeux' early season successes continued at the Tour du Haut Var, when Le Mével won the second stage of the two-day event, and with it the overall.

== Grand Tours ==
As they did in 2009, Française des Jeux declined to participate in the Giro d'Italia.

=== Tour de France ===
FDJ, as they became known shortly before the Tour de France began, entered the race with a squad led by Le Mével, tenth-place finisher and best French rider in 2009. In stage 1, the first road race stage after the prologue time trial, several crashes took place in the final few kilometers, meaning only five riders were at the front of the race to contest the sprint finish. Ladagnous avoided crashing and made this little selection, though he was last of the five riders in the kick to the finish. Ladagnous took a meaningless ninth place the next day, as the peloton decided not to race to the finish, neutralizing the results for all but stage winner Sylvain Chavanel. In stage 9, Casar made a breakaway of 10 riders, including such big names as Luis León Sánchez, Damiano Cunego, and Jens Voigt. All of them figured into the day's results. Race favorites Alberto Contador and Andy Schleck broke away from the other top riders in the race on this day. Voigt dropped back and paced them so long and so strenuously that they joined the leaders on the road, now a five-rider group including Casar, Sánchez, and Cunego. Contador and Schleck finished sixth and seventh on the day, not seeking the stage win. For their parts, Sánchez, Cunego, and Casar finished 2 seconds ahead as the three of them did aggressively seek the win. Cunego started his sprint early and had a gap for a moment, but Casar perhaps knew the course better, taking an aggressive line on the course's final left-hand turn. The finish line was just after that turn, so Casar made it across first and won the stage.

In stage 13, Geslin finished seventh on the stage, sixth in the sprint behind solo winner Alexander Vinokourov. Three days later in stage 16, Casar came close to a second victory. He was part of a day-long breakaway, that included Lance Armstrong, and finished second behind Pierrick Fédrigo in the sprint finish. Casar finished the race in 25th place, the team's best finisher, just under 46 minutes behind Tour champion Alberto Contador. Le Mével was 42nd, more than an hour and 22 minutes back. The squad finished 15th in the teams classification.

== Season victories ==
Date	Race	Competition	Rider	Country	Location
February 10	Tour Méditerranéen, Stage 1	UCI Europe Tour	Yauheni Hutarovich (BLR)	France	Souvain
February 11	Tour Méditerranéen, Stage 2	UCI Europe Tour	Jussi Veikkanen (FIN)	France	Trets
February 12	Tour Méditerranéen, Stage 3	UCI Europe Tour	Yauheni Hutarovich (BLR)	France	Six-Fours-les-Plages
February 17	Volta ao Algarve, Stage 1	UCI Europe Tour	Benoît Vaugrenard (FRA)	Portugal	Albufeira
February 21	Tour du Haut Var, Stage 2	UCI Europe Tour	Christophe Le Mével (FRA)	France	Montauroux
February 21	Tour du Haut Var, Overall	UCI Europe Tour	Christophe Le Mével (FRA)	France	
April 9	Circuit Cycliste Sarthe, Youth classification	UCI Europe Tour	Anthony Roux (FRA)	France	
April 9	Circuit Cycliste Sarthe, Teams classification	UCI Europe Tour	(Note: The riders on the squad were Sébastien Chavanel, Anthony Roux, Arthur Vichot, Thibaut Pinot, and Jérémy Roy)	France	
April 19	Tro-Bro Léon	UCI Europe Tour	Jérémy Roy (FRA)	France	Brittany
May 2	Tour de Romandie, Mountains classification	UCI ProTour	Thibaut Pinot (FRA)	Switzerland	
May 9	Four Days of Dunkirk, Stage 5	UCI Europe Tour	Benoît Vaugrenard (FRA)	France	Dunkirk
May 19	Circuit de Lorraine, Stage 1	UCI Europe Tour	Yauheni Hutarovich (BLR)	France	Jarny
May 23	Circuit de Lorraine, Stage 5	UCI Europe Tour	Anthony Roux (FRA)	France	Hayange
May 29	Grand Prix de Plumelec-Morbihan	UCI Europe Tour	Wesley Sulzberger (AUS)	France	Brittany
June 20	Route du Sud, Points classification	UCI Europe Tour	Gianni Meersman (BEL)	France	
July 13	Tour de France, Stage 9	UCI World Ranking	Sandy Casar (FRA)	France	Saint-Jean-de-Maurienne
August 3	Tour de Pologne, Stage 3	UCI World Ranking	Yauheni Hutarovich (BLR)	Poland	Katowice
August 5	Paris–Corrèze, Stage 2	UCI Europe Tour	Arthur Vichot (FRA)	France	Chaumeil
August 5	Paris–Corrèze, Points classification	UCI Europe Tour	Gianni Meersman (BEL)	France	
August 5	Paris–Corrèze, Mountains classification	UCI Europe Tour	Thibault Pinot (FRA)	France	
August 5	Paris–Corrèze, Teams classification	UCI Europe Tour	(Note: The riders on the squad were Pierre Cazaux, Olivier Bonnaire, Mikaël Cherel, Gianni Meersman, Thibaut Pinot, Arthur Vichot, and trainee riders Nacer Bouhanni and Nicolas Capdepuy)	France	
August 24	Tour du Poitou-Charentes, Stage 1	UCI Europe Tour	Anthony Roux (FRA)	France	Royan
August 29	Vuelta a España, Stage 2	UCI World Ranking	Yauheni Hutarovich (BLR)	Spain	Marbella
