= Marion Rousse =

French cyclist (born 1991)

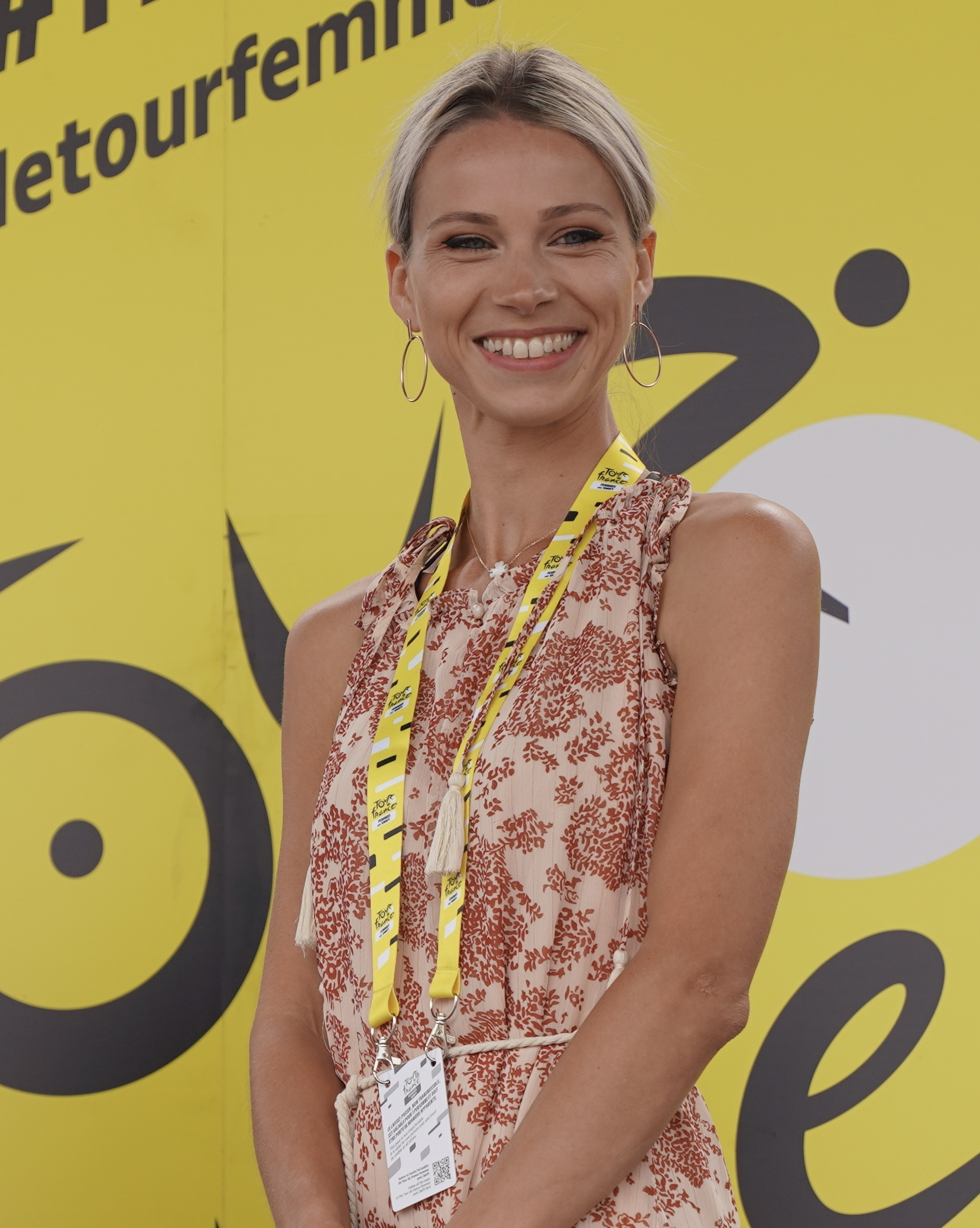
- Marion Rousse, 2022 Tour de France Femmes

Personal information
- Born: 17 August 1991 (age 35) Saint-Saulve, France

Cycling career
- Sport: Cycling
- Current team: Retired
- Role: Rider
- Rider type: Puncheur

Professional teams
- 2010: GSD Gestion
- 2011–2012: Vienne Futuroscope
- 2013–2015: Lotto Belisol Ladies

Major wins
- 2012 French National Road Race

Marion Rousse (born 17 August 1991) is a French former racing cyclist, who is best known for having won the French national road race title in 2012. She announced her retirement from racing in October 2015. Rousse is the cousin of racing cyclists David Lefèvre, Laurent Lefèvre and Olivier Bonnaire. Outside racing, Rousse has also worked as a pundit for Eurosport and France Télévisions. Since 2019, she has also served as deputy director of the Tour de la Provence. In 2021, she became race director of the Tour de France Femmes.

== Personal life ==
Rousse married fellow racing cyclist and Tour de France stage winner Tony Gallopin in October 2014. In February 2020 she announced via an Instagram post that the couple had separated. Two months later Julian Alaphilippe announced in an interview with L'Équipe that he and Rousse were in a relationship. In January 2021 Alaphilippe announced via social media that the couple were expecting a child. Their son was born 14 June 2021.
