= 2011 FDJ season =

FDJ
- 2011 season
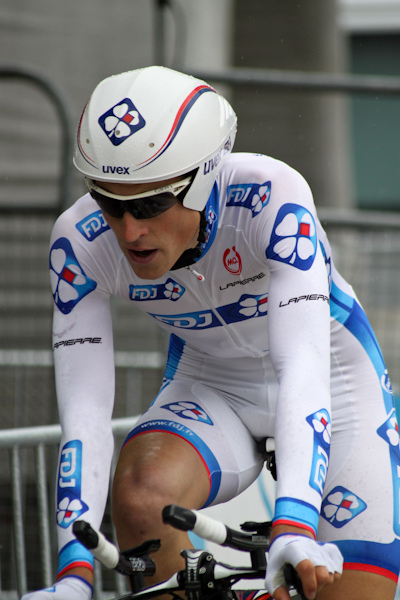
- Arnold Jeannesson at the 2011 Critérium du Dauphiné
- UCI code: FDJ
- Status: UCI Professional Continental
- Europe Tour ranking: 1st (2551.1 points)
- Manager: Marc Madiot
- Main sponsor(s): Française des Jeux
- Based: France
- Bicycles: Lapierre
- Groupset: Shimano

Season victories
- One-day races: 7
- Stage race overall: 5
- Stage race stages: 16
- National Championships: 0

The 2011 season for the FDJ cycling team began in January at La Tropicale Amissa Bongo and ended in October at the Chrono des Nations. The season was their first as a UCI Professional Continental team, having been denied UCI ProTeam status for 2011 in the preceding offseason, due to a paperwork error. Thus, the team had to be selected by organizers of UCI World Tour events, including each of the season's Grand Tours, if they were to compete. Only the Tour de France extended a wildcard invitation to FDJ.

While the team was not particularly competitive in the World Tour level races to which they received invites, they dominated the UCI Europe Tour. As their Professional Continental status meant they were scored for Europe Tour performances, they handily won the Europe Tour teams competition, finishing with more than a thousand more points than second-placed Skil–Shimano. Of the team's 28 victories, all but two were in Europe Tour races. Jérémy Roy won the overall combativity award at the Tour de France, the team's most notable performance in a World Tour race on the year. The team had no one star rider in 2011, as seven different riders won multiple races.

== 2011 roster ==
Ages as of January 1, 2011.

Rider	Date of birth
Olivier Bonnaire (FRA)	March 2, 1983 (aged 27)
William Bonnet (FRA)	June 25, 1982 (aged 28)
Nacer Bouhanni (FRA)	July 25, 1990 (aged 20)
Sandy Casar (FRA)	February 2, 1979 (aged 31)
Steve Chainel (FRA)	September 6, 1983 (aged 27)
Arnaud Courteille (FRA)	March 13, 1989 (aged 21)
Mickaël Delage (FRA)	August 6, 1985 (aged 25)
Arnaud Démare (Note: Rider joined the team on August 1 as a stagiaire.) (FRA)	August 26, 1991 (aged 19)
Kenny Elissonde (FRA)	July 22, 1991 (aged 19)
Pierrick Fédrigo (FRA)	November 30, 1978 (aged 32)
Arnaud Gérard (FRA)	October 6, 1984 (aged 26)
Anthony Geslin (FRA)	June 9, 1980 (aged 30)
Frédéric Guesdon (FRA)	October 14, 1971 (aged 39)
Yauheni Hutarovich (BLR)	November 29, 1983 (aged 27)
Arnold Jeannesson (FRA)	January 15, 1986 (aged 24)

Rider	Date of birth
Mathieu Ladagnous (FRA)	December 12, 1984 (aged 26)
Gianni Meersman (BEL)	December 5, 1985 (aged 25)
Francis Mourey (FRA)	December 8, 1980 (aged 30)
Yoann Offredo (FRA)	November 12, 1986 (aged 24)
Rémi Pauriol (FRA)	April 4, 1982 (aged 28)
Cédric Pineau (FRA)	May 8, 1985 (aged 25)
Thibaut Pinot (FRA)	May 29, 1990 (aged 20)
Dominique Rollin (CAN)	October 29, 1982 (aged 28)
Anthony Roux (FRA)	April 18, 1987 (aged 23)
Jérémy Roy (FRA)	June 22, 1983 (aged 27)
Fabien Schmidt (FRA)	March 23, 1989 (aged 21)
Geoffrey Soupe (FRA)	March 22, 1988 (aged 22)
Wesley Sulzberger (AUS)	October 20, 1986 (aged 24)
Benoît Vaugrenard (FRA)	January 5, 1982 (aged 28)
Arthur Vichot (FRA)	November 26, 1988 (aged 22)

Riders who joined the team for the 2011 season

Rider	2010 team
William Bonnet	Bbox Bouygues Telecom
Nacer Bouhanni	stagiaire (FDJ)
Steve Chainel	Bbox Bouygues Telecom
Arnaud Courteille	neo-pro
Mickaël Delage	Omega Pharma–Lotto
Pierrick Fédrigo	Bbox Bouygues Telecom
Arnold Jeannesson	Caisse d'Epargne
Rémi Pauriol	Cofidis
Cédric Pineau	Roubaix–Lille Métropole
Dominique Rollin	Cervélo TestTeam
Geoffrey Soupe	neo-pro

Riders who left the team during or after the 2010 season

Rider	2011 team
Pierre Cazaux	Euskaltel–Euskadi
Sébastien Chavanel	Team Europcar
Mikaël Cherel	Ag2r–La Mondiale
Rémy Di Gregorio	Astana
Timothy Gudsell	Team PureBlack Racing
Christophe Le Mével	Garmin–Cervélo
Jussi Veikkanen	Omega Pharma–Lotto

== One-day races ==
Before the spring season and the races known as classics, Roy won the first race of the season held in France, the Grand Prix d'Ouverture La Marseillaise. He was part of the morning breakaway with two others, and rode away from them to victory after starting his solo move with 15 km (9.3 mi) left to race. In the first large group on the road, which finished 2'43" down on Roy, FDJ had Vichot in fifth and Pineau in eighth, giving them three of the top ten riders on the day.

=== Spring classics ===
Vichot won Les Boucles du Sud Ardèche, taking place on the traditional opening weekend for the spring classics, at the front of a 12-rider sprint finish. On the same weekend, Offredo finished fourth at Omloop Het Nieuwsblad, and Hutarovich finished second to Team Sky rider Christopher Sutton in Kuurne–Brussels–Kuurne; falling short by around a bike length, while Ladagnous featured in the main breakaways of both races. In March, Hutarovich finished fifth in Le Samyn, nine seconds down on race-winner, Dominic Klemme of Leopard Trek. Chainel finished sixth in the Grand Prix de la Ville de Lillers, before Meersman placed second in Paris–Troyes, losing out to Saur–Sojasun rider Jonathan Hivert in a four-man sprint to the line. Chainel and Bouhanni also placed in the top ten, finishing fifth and eighth respectively. After another breakaway in which Ladagnous was involved in, Hutarovich finished fifth in a mass sprint at the conclusion of Nokere Koerse. At Classic Loire Atlantique in France, after creating a four-man breakaway with Lieuwe Westra of Vacansoleil–DCM, Saur–Sojasun's Jean-Marc Marino and Landbouwkrediet rider Frédéric Amorison, they were joined by five other riders within the last 5 km (3.1 mi), and Geslin ultimately could not hold onto the leaders' pace, and eventually finished sixth, 22 seconds down.

The team showed strongly at the first monument race of the season, Milan–San Remo. Chainel and Offredo were two of the 44 riders in the leading group on the road after a crash on the Le Manie climb 90 km (56 mi) from the finish effectively split the race in to. Both of them attacked and got free on the Cipressa, the course's penultimate climb, drawing Stuart O'Grady and Greg Van Avermaet with them. Chainel drove the group, sacrificing himself for Offredo. Vincenzo Nibali caught and surpassed them on the Poggio, the last climb on the course, but Offredo stayed with the group chasing Nibali, driven by world time trial champion Fabian Cancellara, and finished at the front of the race. He, Nibali, and Philippe Gilbert opened up the sprint for victory, made somewhat unusual by the fact that it was contested by eight riders representing eight different teams. Most of the leading group passed up Offredo, but he finished with a strong seventh place on the day. Madiot was impressed by Offredo's ride, his second attacking performance in Milan–San Remo in as many participations, and stated that he believed Offredo had a strong future as a classics rider ahead of him. While seventh place would have awarded 30 UCI World Tour points, Offredo's performance was not scored due to FDJ's relegation to Professional Continental status in the offseason. It had no bearing on the number of riders France were afforded at the world championships, unlike the nations of the other top performers in the race.

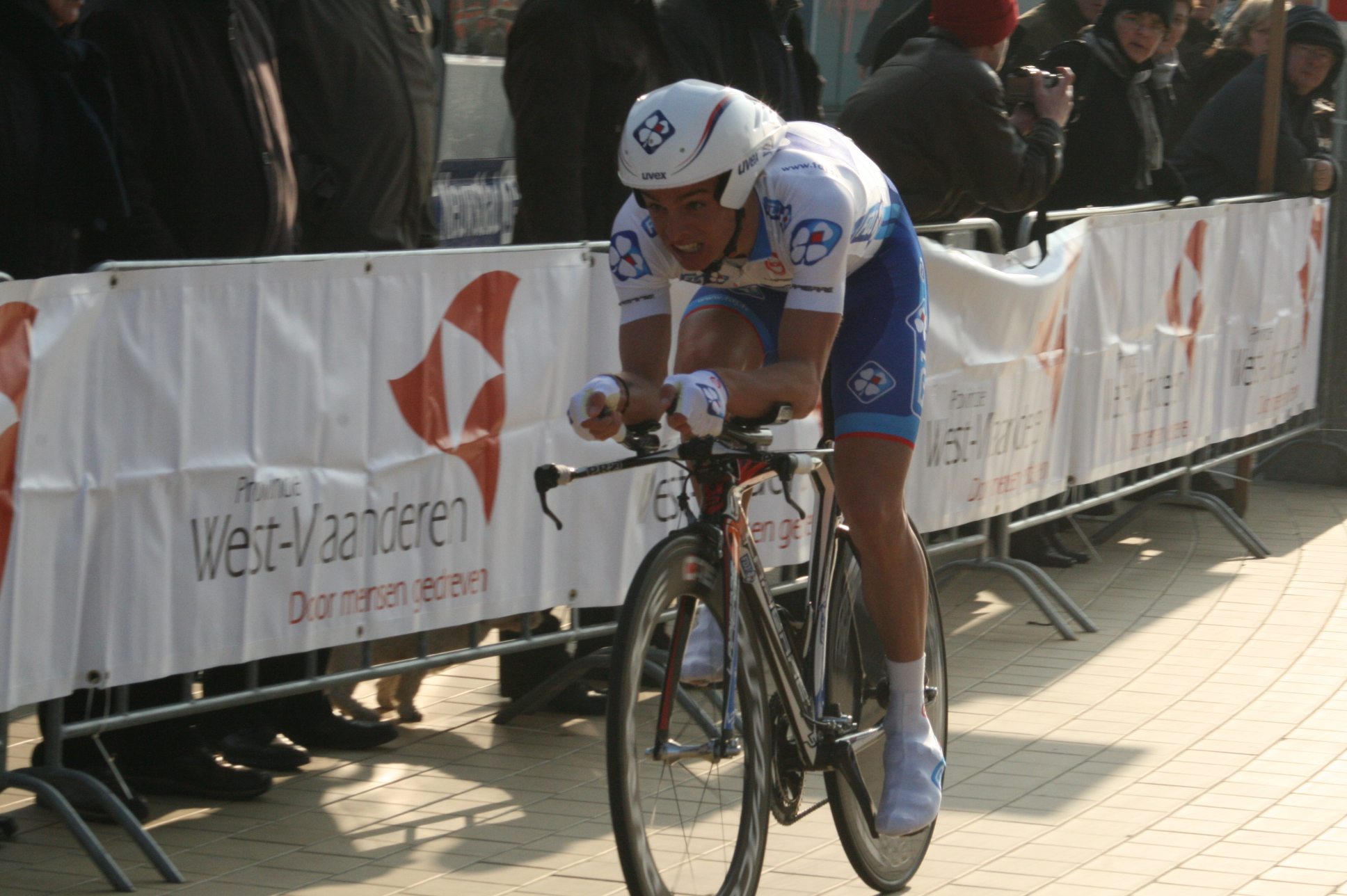
Gianni Meersman, pictured at Driedaagse van West-Vlaanderen, finished in the top five of four single-day races in the first half of the season, including second places in Paris–Troyes and Route Adélie.

Three days later, Rollin finished tenth in Dwars door Vlaanderen. Bonnet finished sixth in the succeeding E3 Prijs Vlaanderen – Harelbeke three days later, after making his way into the breakaway, with Chainel also making it into a secondary breakaway from the main field after pressure from the Garmin–Cervélo squad. He eventually finished the race 15th. At the beginning of April, Meersman earned his second runner-up placing in the space of three weeks, finishing behind Renaud Dion (Bretagne–Schuller) in Route Adélie; Meersman had been one of seven riders in contention for victory in a breakaway in the closing stages. Meersman followed up that performance two days later, in the inaugural Flèche d'Emeraude, by finishing fourth in the final mass sprint. Hutarovich finished third in the Scheldeprijs three days later, having avoided a crash in the finishing straight which eliminated several riders from contention for the top placings. Casar won Paris–Camembert later in April, by making a late ten-rider selection which included teammate Fédrigo, who worked to set Casar up for a sprint on the uphill finish. Casar was easily the strongest, ahead of Romain Hardy and Julien Antomarchi.

The following day, Geslin finished third in Brabantse Pijl, having been a part of a seven-man lead group, before Omega Pharma–Lotto's Philippe Gilbert and Vacansoleil–DCM rider Björn Leukemans attacked off the front and stayed away until the end. Meersman also finished within the top ten – in eighth place – after a counter-attack from the main field. Bouhanni finished eighth at the Grand Prix de Denain, before Casar finished third in the next day's Tour du Finistère, after Vacansoleil–DCM's Romain Feillu gapped the field in an uphill sprint to the line. Jeannesson and Chainel were part of a quartet of riders that were in the running for victory in Tro-Bro Léon, but both riders faded in the closing stages, and eventually finished third and fourth, 20 seconds down on race-winner Vincent Jérôme of Team Europcar. In May, Fédrigo finished second, behind BigMat–Auber 93 rider Sylvain Georges, in the Grand Prix de Plumelec-Morbihan, while Pauriol finished tenth in the next day's Boucles de l'Aulne. Meersman completed the team's first-half single-day schedule, with third place in Halle–Ingooigem.

The team also sent squads to the Trofeo Laigueglia, Cholet-Pays de Loire, Gent–Wevelgem, the GP Miguel Induráin, the Tour of Flanders, Paris–Roubaix, La Flèche Wallonne and Liège–Bastogne–Liège, but placed no higher than 11th in any of these races.

=== Fall races ===
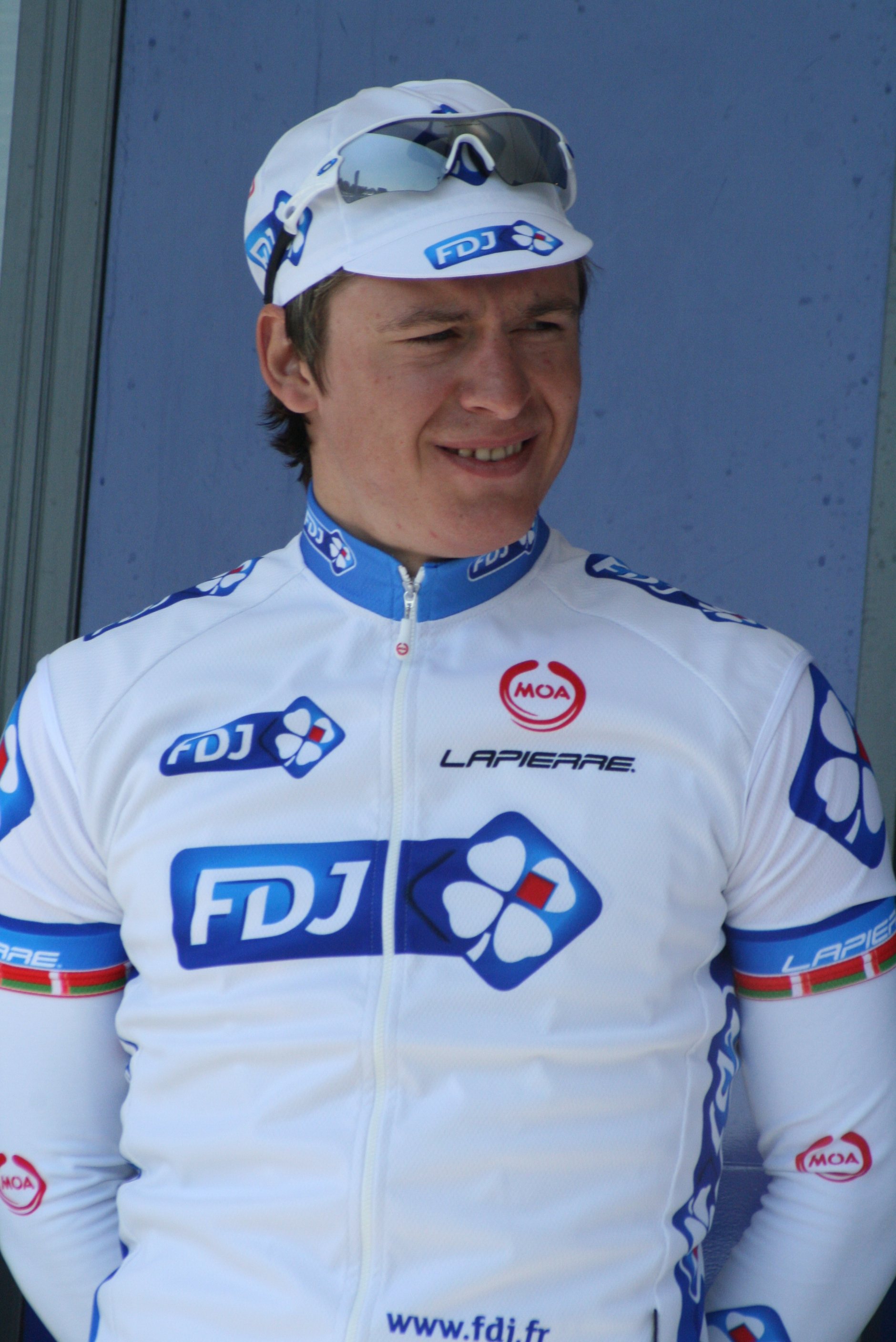
Yauheni Hutarovich, pictured at the Four Days of Dunkirk, triumphed in two single-day races in the second half of 2011; winning the Coppa Bernocchi in August and the Nationale Sluitingsprijs in October, as well as three runner-up placings.

The second half of the 2011 season for FDJ began with La Ronde Pévèloise, held concurrently with the Tour de France, in which the team also competed in. Hutarovich finished second to Arnaud Démare – who joined the squad in August as a stagiaire – in a sprint finish, with Soupe also finishing in fifth place. The following week, Ladagnous placed second in the Grand Prix José Dubois, just behind Landbouwkrediet rider Sébastien Delfosse. Courteille finished fifth in the race, 13 seconds behind Delfosse. In late July, the team took two of the top eight placings at the Polynormande, with Gérard in third and Ladagnous in eighth. Gérard had been part of a breakaway, and Ladagnous third from the peloton just over four and a half minutes behind race-winner Anthony Delaplace (Saur–Sojasun). Pinot earned another third place for the team in August's Tre Valli Varesine; he accelerated clear of Astana's Enrico Gasparotto, who had tried to break the peloton and chase after Davide Rebellin (Miche–Guerciotti) and Domenico Pozzovivo of Colnago–CSF Inox, after they broke clear with under 1 km (0.62 mi) remaining.

The squad's fourth one-day win of the season came two days later, in the final race of Trittico Lombardo, at the Coppa Bernocchi. Hutarovich was one of a select group of sprinters to maintain a position within the main field in the prospect of a potential sprint finish, in which he would be one of the favourites for. With support from Casar, Jeannesson and Vaugrenard, Hutarovich was led towards the front of the main field just before the race entered its closing stages. A late-race crash reduced the number of riders in contention, and left Hutarovich, Colnago–CSF Inox rider Manuel Belletti, Giovanni Visconti of Farnese Vini–Neri Sottoli and Liquigas–Cannondale duo Kristijan Koren and Maciej Paterski clear of the field. Hutarovich out-sprinted his rivals to take the team's first victory in Italy, since Bradley McGee won the prologue stage of the 2004 Giro d'Italia in Genoa. Three days later, Hutarovich finished second to Anthony Ravard of Ag2r–La Mondiale at the Châteauroux Classic in a large field sprint.

The team earned another respectable result on the World Tour stage, at the following weekend's GP Ouest-France in Plouay. Gérard finished in sixth place, while Offredo also managed to finish in the top ten, in tenth place. Vichot took his second French Road Cycling Cup victory of the season, in September's Tour du Doubs, taking a solo victory by 16 seconds over the main field. Ladagnous and Geslin also finished well for the team, placing fourth and fifth respectively. The victory also allowed the squad to take the lead in the teams points standings; a lead that the team would not lose. The same day, stagiaire Schmidt finished inside the top ten of the Grote Prijs Jef Scherens. Soupe made it into the breakaway of the Memorial Rik Van Steenbergen event, but it failed to survive until the end of the race, falling some 10 km (6.2 mi) shy of the finish. Hutarovich contended in the sprint, but could finish no higher than sixth place.

Hutarovich later finished second in Paris–Brussels behind Team Katusha's Denis Galimzyanov, before a sixth place the day after, in the Grand Prix de Fourmies. On the same day as the Grand Prix de Fourmies, the squad recorded their best result in a World Tour single-day race, at the Grand Prix Cycliste de Montréal in Canada. Geslin was part of a four-man move that established a lead of almost five minutes on the road, after 40 km (25 mi). The breakaway did not materialise until the end; instead the quartet were caught on the fifteenth of the race's seventeen laps. From the descent of Mont Royal on the final lap, Fédrigo attacked along with Movistar Team rider Rui Costa and Stefan Denifl of Leopard Trek and the trio managed to break clear of the field, holding a lead of over fifteen seconds within the closing stages. Denifl faded with 150 metres (490 ft) left, and Costa out-sprinted Fédrigo to take victory on the line. Four seconds behind, Vichot finished in eighth place in a sprint of over 20 riders. Another victory occurred in the middle of September with Roux taking the honours in the Tour de la Somme, prior to leaving for the UCI Road World Championships in Denmark. Bouhanni finished fifth, after being helped towards the front by Roux, before he attacked in the closing stages of the race. The same day, Hutarovich earned another top-five placing, by finishing fifth in the Kampioenschap van Vlaanderen.

Roux and Roy finished second in Duo Normand behind Garmin–Cervélo duo Thomas Dekker and Johan Vansummeren, while on the same day, Delage finished ninth in the Grand Prix d'Isbergues. In October, Pinot finished ninth in the Gran Premio Bruno Beghelli. On the same day at Paris–Tours, after a previous breakaway had been caught with 60 km (37 mi) remaining, a group of fourteen riders including Gérard and Delage managed to create a gap to the peloton. The first move from the leaders came from Gérard, 14 km (8.7 mi) out, and he stayed away on his own for a time, before being caught on the final climb of the Côte de l'Epan. Delage's efforts to bring teammate Gérard back into contact with Greg Van Avermaet and Vacansoleil–DCM's Marco Marcato failed, and they eventually finished sixth and tenth respectively. Hutarovich earned the team's final victory of the season in the Nationale Sluitingsprijs two days later, beating Landbouwkrediet neo-pro Joeri Stallaert by around 10 centimetres (3.9 in), and also left Skil–Shimano rider Kenny van Hummel unhappy in relation to a possible impeding in the closing stages.

The team also sent squads to the Coppa Ugo Agostoni, the Gran Premio Industria e Commercio Artigianato Carnaghese, the Grand Prix Cycliste de Québec, the Grand Prix de Wallonie, Omloop van het Houtland, the Tour de Vendée, Binche–Tournai–Binche, Paris–Bourges, the Giro dell'Emilia, the Giro di Lombardia and the Chrono des Nations, but placed no higher than 11th in any of these races.

== Stage races ==
The team was successful in two early-season stage races. Two of their neo-pros took stage wins at La Tropicale Amissa Bongo in the nation of Gabon – Soupe in the opening stage and Bouhanni in stage 3. Bouhanni also won the points classification in the race, with three other top-five stage placings.Their next stage race was the Étoile de Bessèges, which also yielded a victory. This victory belonged to Hutarovich, besting the field in a mass sprint. Their best-placed rider at the end of the race was Fédrigo in fourth place, but Vichot in ninth was the best young rider. Later in February, the team won a minor award at the Tour Méditerranéen, as Pauriol won the climber's prize. Later Roy did likewise at the Tour du Haut Var, with the squad also picking up the teams classification prize. Rollin followed with the points and sprint classifications at the Driedaagse van West-Vlaanderen race. Pauriol won another climber's prize at Paris–Nice. Roux won the only hilly stage and, by extension, the overall and young rider classifications, at the Circuit de la Sarthe. FDJ was easily the strongest team present at the Circuit des Ardennes. Meersman won stage 2, and in so doing took a race lead that he did not relinquish, also taking the points classification prize.

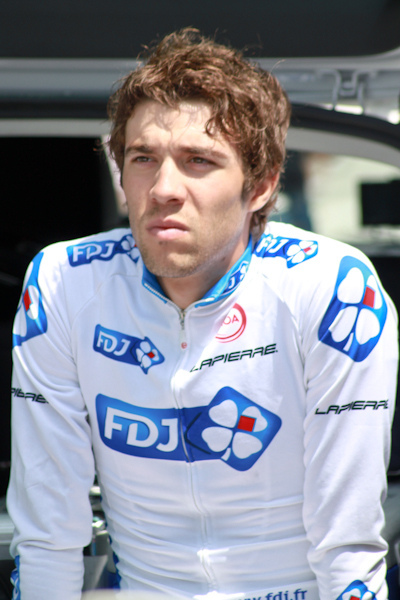
Thibaut Pinot, pictured during one of the team's World Tour wildcard appearances at the Critérium du Dauphiné, achieved overall victories in two races in the second half of the season, as well as five minor-classification triumphs.

Though the team did not win any stage at the Rhône-Alpes Isère Tour, they were ubiquitous in the final standings. Pinot finished second overall, and he also won the mountains and youth classifications. Roy won the combativity classification. At the Circuit de Lorraine, Roux won the opening stage of the race, taking an uphill sprint to the line in Longwy. After losing the overall lead to Romain Feillu on stage 2, Roux remained in the top five, and eventually achieved his second victory of the race during the fourth stage, which moved him back into third place in the race, six seconds behind Feillu's teammate Thomas De Gendt with one stage remaining. Roux overhauled De Gendt through bonus seconds earned on the final stage, and claimed his second overall win in a month and a half; he also finished clear at the top of the points classification. The team failed to win another stage until July's Tour de Wallonie, where Ladagnous won the opening stage into Banneux. He surrendered the race lead the following day, but still finished as the team's best-placed rider in the race, in eleventh place. At the Tour Alsace, Soupe and Bouhanni gave the team a 1–2 finish on the opening stage into Huningue. Both riders severely struggled the following day; Bouhanni lost over 19 minutes on the stage winner, while Soupe failed to finish the stage. In the race's final stage, Pinot soloed to victory and an eventual overall victory – also taking the young rider classification in the process – by 54 seconds over closest rival Stian Remme of Joker–Merida.

Pinot continued his good form in August's Tour de l'Ain, winning two stages including the final stage summit finish to Le Grand Colombier, and also held the overall lead after his stage 2 victory. At the Tour du Limousin, after a seventh place and a second place in the opening two stages, Ladagnous won stage three by out-sprinting Cofidis rider Samuel Dumoulin to the line, enabling him to move into third place in the general classification. Ladagnous repeated his victory the next day, to take second place overall, behind Vacansoleil–DCM's Björn Leukemans. The squad took two minor classification victories at the race, with Roux winning the sprints classification and Geslin winning the mountains classification. Later in August, at the Tour du Poitou-Charentes, the squad took their fifth stage victory of the month as Hutarovich earned another victory in a sprint finish, by taking the spoils in the second stage, and later took the overall lead after a second-place finish in the following morning's third stage. Hutarovich lost almost four minutes in the afternoon time trial, but a fifth-place finish in the final stage secured Hutarovich in the points classification. Pinot scored his fourth stage win of the year by soloing to victory in the opening stage of the Settimana Ciclistica Lombarda. Pinot maintained his overall lead to the end of the race, and also won the young rider classification, as he did in the Alsace.

The team also won lesser classifications at the Tour of Turkey, and the Bayern-Rundfahrt. The team also sent squads to the Tour of Qatar, the Tour of Oman, Settimana internazionale di Coppi e Bartali, the Critérium International, the Three Days of De Panne, the Four Days of Dunkirk, the Tour de Picardie, the Tour de Luxembourg, the Critérium du Dauphiné, Delta Tour Zeeland, the Ster ZLM Toer, the Route du Sud, Paris–Corrèze, Vuelta a Burgos and the Tour de Wallonie-Picarde, but did not achieve a stage win, classification win, or podium finish in any of them.

== Grand Tours ==
As a Professional Continental team, FDJ needed to be selected by the organizers of any of the Grand Tours in order to participate. They were selected to ride the Tour de France, but not the Giro d'Italia nor the Vuelta a España.

=== Tour de France ===
Casar was the team's de facto leader for the race, with Bonnet, Delage, Jeannesson, Meersman, Pauriol, Roux, Roy and Vichot making up the nine-man outfit. Casar's position came at the non-inclusion of Fédrigo, who elected to skip the race – as did Hutarovich – due to fatigue and poor form. Roy made the first breakaway of the Tour along with two other riders, and took the honours in the first intermediate sprint of the race, earning 20 points to the revised-for-2011 points classification. The team's showing in the stage 2 team time trial was average, as they came home ninth of the 22 teams, 46 seconds off the winning pace set by Garmin–Cervélo. Delage was in the day's breakaway on the third stage, with an advantage of eight minutes during one point of the stage; he also repeated the feat of Roy by taking maximum intermediate sprint points on the stage, and after being caught with 9 km (5.6 mi) remaining, he was awarded the most combative rider of the day.

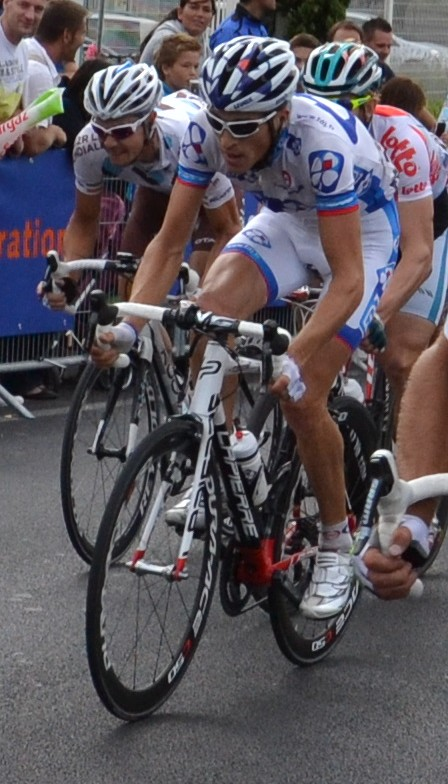
In his first Tour appearance, Arnold Jeannesson held the lead of the young rider classification for two days, and finished as the team's highest-placed rider, in 15th place overall.

Roy kept the award with the team for his performance on stage four; after 9 km (5.6 mi), he established the breakaway with four other riders but they could not muster a big enough advantage for a stage victory, and were caught in the closing stages. Roy made another move on the road in stage 5, linking up with Team Europcar's Thomas Voeckler for an attack with 32 km (19.9 mi) remaining. After establishing a lead of around a minute, the main field brought them back to within sight, where Voeckler attacked with 3 km (1.9 mi) left, but he like Roy, fell short of winning the stage. Bonnet took the team's first top-ten placing of the race, by finishing eighth. FDJ continued their trend of having a rider in each day's breakaway; Roux was the rider in question on stage 6, but was dropped by two other riders and was caught by the main field with 38 km (23.6 mi) remaining. In the sprint finish, Vichot and Jeannesson both made it into the top ten placings, in sixth and tenth respectively.

On stage 7, Delage made it into his second breakaway of the Tour, and was joined by Meersman, and two other riders, who enjoyed an advantage of up to eight minutes on the road, but were swept up by the field with 14 km (8.7 mi) remaining. Bonnet finished in fifth place in the mass sprint to the line, but the squad finished a man down on the stage, as Pauriol abandoned the race with a broken collarbone, after a large crash in the field which also eliminated several other riders. Casar's breakaway on stage 9 was successful as he joined several other riders in making it to the finish before the main pack had caught them; despite not offering a challenge to Voeckler or Luis León Sánchez (Rabobank), he still finished the stage third, but was not enough for him to break into the top 30 in the general classification. A third breakaway for Delage on stage 11 provided him with a second combativity award of the race, having been out front for around 150 km (93.2 mi). Bonnet again cracked the top ten placings on a stage, just ahead of Jeannesson, with Meersman also finishing inside the top 15.

As the race moved into its second half, the squad continued their attacking mentality, as Roy made the breakaway on stage 12, and was out front for the entire day until part-way up the final climb to Luz Ardiden, when he and companion Geraint Thomas (Team Sky) were caught with 8 km (5.0 mi) remaining by Jelle Vanendert (Omega Pharma–Lotto) and Euskaltel–Euskadi's Samuel Sánchez; the latter pair eventually went on to finish in first and second on the stage. Jeannesson, with a twelfth place stage finish, assumed the lead of the young rider classification from Rabobank's Robert Gesink. Roy attacked again the next day, on the hors catégorie Col d'Aubisque climb, and held a lead of two minutes with 30 km (18.6 mi) left on the stage, but was caught by Garmin–Cervélo's Thor Hushovd – a rider who had been dropped by Roy on the Aubisque – and was also passed by Cofidis rider David Moncoutié before the finish. Roy did however receive his second combative rider award of the race, and also assumed the lead of the mountains classification.

A trio of FDJ riders – Casar, Delage and Vichot – were in the breakaway on stage 14; Casar at one point held the lead of the race overall on the stage, but ultimately was not to last until the end. Casar remained at the head of the field for most of the stage, and indeed made a solo attack with 25 km (15.5 mi) to go on the stage. He held the lead onto the slopes of the Plateau de Beille, but was eventually caught with around 7 km (4.3 mi) left. His efforts rewarded the team with yet another most combative rider of the day award. Roy and Jeannesson both lost their respective classification leads to Vanendert and Rigoberto Urán (Team Sky). Delage and Roy were part of breakaways either side of the race's second race day, with Roy achieving a better result; he finished seventh on stage 16, into Gap. Casar took another third-place finish on stage 17, as the race ventured into Italy and the stage finish in Pinerolo. Delage launched the team's final breakaway of the race on stage 18, but as was the case with his other attempts, he failed to profit in the end results. Jeannesson finished the Tour as the team's best placed rider, 21 minutes down in 15th place. Roy was given the honour of being the most combative rider of the Tour.

== Season victories ==
Date	Race	Competition	Rider	Country	Location
January 25	La Tropicale Amissa Bongo, Stage 1	UCI Africa Tour	Geoffrey Soupe (FRA)	Gabon	Bitam
January 27	La Tropicale Amissa Bongo, Stage 3	UCI Africa Tour	Nacer Bouhanni (FRA)	Gabon	Oyem
January 30	La Tropicale Amissa Bongo, Points classification	UCI Africa Tour	Nacer Bouhanni (FRA)	Gabon	
January 30	Grand Prix d'Ouverture La Marseillaise	UCI Europe Tour	Jérémy Roy (FRA)	France	Marseille
February 2	Étoile de Bessèges, Stage 1	UCI Europe Tour	Yauheni Hutarovich (BLR)	France	Bellegarde
February 6	Étoile de Bessèges, Young rider classification	UCI Europe Tour	Arthur Vichot (FRA)	France	
February 13	Tour Méditerranéen, Mountains classification	UCI Europe Tour	Rémi Pauriol (FRA)	France	
February 20	Tour du Haut Var, Mountains classification	UCI Europe Tour	Jérémy Roy (FRA)	France	
February 20	Tour du Haut Var, Teams classification	UCI Europe Tour	(Note: The riders on the squad were Pierrick Fédrigo, Rémi Pauriol, Cédric Pineau, Benoît Vaugrenard, Thibaut Pinot, Anthony Roux, Arthur Vichot, and Jérémy Roy)	France	
February 27	Les Boucles du Sud Ardèche	UCI Europe Tour	Arthur Vichot (FRA)	France	Ruoms
March 6	Driedaagse van West-Vlaanderen, Points classification	UCI Europe Tour	Dominique Rollin (CAN)	Belgium	
March 6	Driedaagse van West-Vlaanderen, Sprints classification	UCI Europe Tour	Dominique Rollin (CAN)	Belgium	
March 13	Paris–Nice, Mountains classification	UCI World Tour	Rémi Pauriol (FRA)	France	
April 7	Circuit de la Sarthe, Stage 4	UCI Europe Tour	Anthony Roux (FRA)	France	Pré-en-Pail
April 8	Circuit de la Sarthe, Overall	UCI Europe Tour	Anthony Roux (FRA)	France	
April 8	Circuit de la Sarthe, Young rider classification	UCI Europe Tour	Anthony Roux (FRA)	France	
April 9	Circuit des Ardennes, Stage 2	UCI Europe Tour	Gianni Meersman (BEL)	France	Vireux-Wallerand
April 10	Circuit des Ardennes, Overall	UCI Europe Tour	Gianni Meersman (BEL)	France	
April 10	Circuit des Ardennes, Points classification	UCI Europe Tour	Gianni Meersman (BEL)	France	
April 12	Paris–Camembert	UCI Europe Tour	Sandy Casar (FRA)	France	Vimoutiers
May 1	Tour of Turkey, Teams classification	UCI Europe Tour	(Note: The riders on the squad were Sandy Casar, Nacer Bouhanni, Francis Mourey, Rémi Pauriol, Thibaut Pinot, Anthony Roux, Wesley Sulzberger, and Arthur Vichot)	Turkey	
May 15	Rhône-Alpes Isère Tour, Mountains classification	UCI Europe Tour	Thibaut Pinot (FRA)	France	
May 15	Rhône-Alpes Isère Tour, Young rider classification	UCI Europe Tour	Thibaut Pinot (FRA)	France	
May 15	Rhône-Alpes Isère Tour, Most combative classification	UCI Europe Tour	Jérémy Roy (FRA)	France	
May 18	Circuit de Lorraine, Stage 1	UCI Europe Tour	Anthony Roux (FRA)	France	Longwy
May 21	Circuit de Lorraine, Stage 4	UCI Europe Tour	Anthony Roux (FRA)	Germany	Rehlingen
May 22	Circuit de Lorraine, Overall	UCI Europe Tour	Anthony Roux (FRA)	France	
May 22	Circuit de Lorraine, Points classification	UCI Europe Tour	Anthony Roux (FRA)	France	
May 29	Bayern-Rundfahrt, Young rider classification	UCI Europe Tour	Thibaut Pinot (FRA)	Germany	
July 23	Tour de Wallonie, Stage 1	UCI Europe Tour	Mathieu Ladagnous (FRA)	Belgium	Banneux
July 24	Tour de France, Overall combativity award	UCI World Tour	Jérémy Roy (FRA)	France	
July 27	Tour Alsace, Stage 1	UCI Europe Tour	Geoffrey Soupe (FRA)	France	Huningue
July 31	Tour Alsace, Stage 5	UCI Europe Tour	Thibaut Pinot (FRA)	France	Ballon d'Alsace
July 31	Tour Alsace, Overall	UCI Europe Tour	Thibaut Pinot (FRA)	France	
August 11	Tour de l'Ain, Stage 2	UCI Europe Tour	Thibaut Pinot (FRA)	France	Bellignat
August 13	Tour de l'Ain, Stage 4	UCI Europe Tour	Thibaut Pinot (FRA)	France	Le Grand Colombier
August 18	Tour du Limousin, Stage 3	UCI Europe Tour	Mathieu Ladagnous (FRA)	France	St. Yrieix
August 18	Coppa Bernocchi	UCI Europe Tour	Yauheni Hutarovich (BLR)	Italy	Legnano
August 19	Tour du Limousin, Stage 4	UCI Europe Tour	Mathieu Ladagnous (FRA)	France	Limoges
August 24	Tour du Poitou Charentes, Stage 2	UCI Europe Tour	Yauheni Hutarovich (BLR)	France	Bressuire
August 26	Tour du Poitou Charentes, Points classification	UCI Europe Tour	Yauheni Hutarovich (BLR)	France	
August 31	Settimana Ciclistica Lombarda, Stage 1	UCI Europe Tour	Thibaut Pinot (FRA)	Italy	Castione della Presolana
September 3	Settimana Ciclistica Lombarda, Overall	UCI Europe Tour	Thibaut Pinot (FRA)	Italy	
September 3	Settimana Ciclistica Lombarda, Youth classification	UCI Europe Tour	Thibaut Pinot (FRA)	Italy	
September 4	Tour du Doubs	UCI Europe Tour	Arthur Vichot (FRA)	France	Pontarlier
September 16	Tour de la Somme	UCI Europe Tour	Anthony Roux (FRA)	France	Somme
October 2	French Road Cycling Cup, Teams classification	French Road Cycling Cup		France	
October 11	Nationale Sluitingsprijs	UCI Europe Tour	Yauheni Hutarovich (BLR)	Belgium	Kapellen
October 16	UCI Europe Tour, Teams classification	UCI Europe Tour			
