= Stortoni =

Stortoni is an Italian surname. Notable people with the surname include:

- Bernardo Stortoni (born 1976), Argentine rugby union player
- Simone Stortoni (born 1985), Italian cyclist
