= 2010 Giro d'Italia =

2010 UCI World Ranking, race 14 of 26
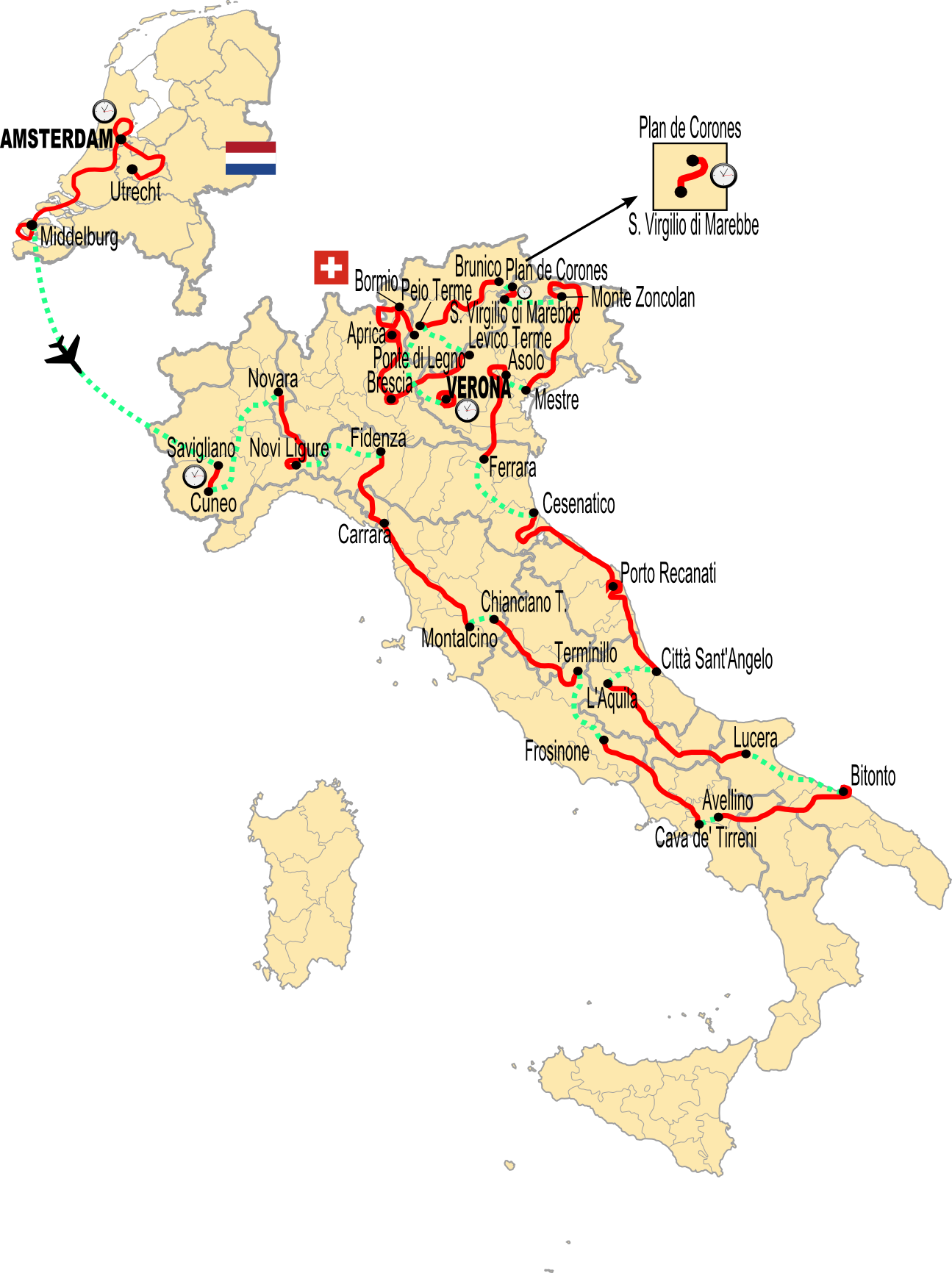
- Overview of the stages: route from Amsterdam to Venice covered by the riders on the bicycle (red) and transfers between stages (green).

Race details
- Dates: 8 – 30 May 2010
- Stages: 21
- Distance: 3,485 km (2,165 mi)
- Winning time: 87h 44' 01"

Results
Jersey awarded to the overall winner	Winner	Ivan Basso (ITA)	(Liquigas–Doimo)
	Second	David Arroyo (ESP)	(Caisse d'Epargne)
	Third	Vincenzo Nibali (ITA)	(Liquigas–Doimo)
Jersey awarded to the points classification winner	Points	Cadel Evans (AUS)	(BMC Racing Team)
Jersey awarded to the mountains classification winner	Mountains	Matthew Lloyd (AUS)	(Omega Pharma–Lotto)
Jersey awarded to the young rider classification winner	Young rider	Richie Porte (AUS)	(Team Saxo Bank)
	Sprints	Tom Stamsnijder (NED)	(Rabobank)
Jersey awarded to the combativity classification winner	Combativity	Matthew Lloyd (AUS)	(Omega Pharma–Lotto)
	Team	Liquigas–Doimo	
	Team points	Liquigas–Doimo	

The 2010 Giro d'Italia was the 93rd edition of the Giro d'Italia, one of cycling's Grand Tours. The race started off in Amsterdam on 8 May and stayed in the Netherlands for three stages, before leaving the country. The route included climbs such as Monte Zoncolan, Plan de Corones, the Passo del Mortirolo and the Passo di Gavia before ending in Verona with an individual time trial.

Principal favorites for overall success in the Giro included Ivan Basso of the Liquigas–Doimo team, Cadel Evans for BMC Racing Team, and Cervélo TestTeam's Carlos Sastre. After three weeks of racing, it was Basso who claimed his second Giro d'Italia title, after also winning in 2006. David Arroyo from Caisse d'Epargne and Basso's teammate Vincenzo Nibali rounded out the podium. Australian riders won all the lesser jersey awards, with Evans taking the points classification, Omega Pharma–Lotto's Matthew Lloyd the winner of the mountains classification, and Richie Porte of Team Saxo Bank the Giro's best young rider.

The road race stages in the Netherlands were both marred by repeated crashes, which led to some unexpected big time gaps before the transfer to Italy. The overall standings were very turbulent in the first week, with four different riders holding the race leader's pink jersey. The 11th stage greatly re-shaped the overall standings, when several riders, including Sastre, gained almost 13 minutes against the remainder of the field. Porte took the pink jersey after this stage. Two days later, Arroyo took the jersey, and kept it for five days. He eventually lost it to Basso on the first of two very difficult mountain stages to close out the Giro. Success was fairly widespread among the Giro's 22 teams, as 17 of them came away with either a stage win, classification win, or stint in the pink jersey.

== Teams ==
The 22 teams in the race were announced on 22 March. Sixteen teams were guaranteed a place in the race by virtue of a September 2008 agreement between the UCI and the organizers of the season's three Grand Tours. Those guaranteed a place are those who were members of the UCI ProTour at the time of the agreement. Two from this group, Euskaltel–Euskadi and Française des Jeux, declined to participate in the race, instead focusing on the Tour de France and the Vuelta a España. Two new teams joined the ProTour for 2010. One, Team Sky, participated in the race, but the other, Team RadioShack, did not wish to participate, since they planned to send their best riders to the partially concurrent Tour of California. Seven UCI Professional Continental teams, two of which (Bbox Bouygues Telecom and Cofidis) were part of the September 2008 agreement as they were members of the ProTour at that time, joined the 15 ProTour teams to round out the teams list. Each team entered a squad of nine riders, giving the event a 198-rider peloton at its outset.

The race's 22 teams were:

- Acqua & Sapone
- Ag2r–La Mondiale
- Androni Giocattoli
- Astana
- Bbox Bouygues Telecom
- BMC Racing Team
- Caisse d'Epargne
- Cervélo TestTeam
- Cofidis
- Colnago–CSF Inox
- Footon–Servetto–Fuji
- Garmin–Transitions
- Lampre–Farnese Vini
- Liquigas–Doimo
- Omega Pharma–Lotto
- Quick-Step
- Rabobank
- Team HTC–Columbia
- Team Katusha
- Team Milram
- Team Saxo Bank
- Team Sky

=== Non-invitation of Dutch teams ===
The Giro, like the 2009 Vuelta a España before it and the forthcoming Tour de France, began in the Netherlands. The two Dutch Professional Continental teams, Skil–Shimano and Vacansoleil, had both ridden Grand Tours in 2009. Throughout the season, the two teams tried to prove their combativeness in the hopes of securing Grand Tour invites, trying especially to outdo one another. Since the openings to the Giro and the Tour were partly financed by Dutch tax money, Vacansoleil's team manager called for political help to get invites for his team, but neither Dutch team made it into either the Giro or the Tour. Consequently, neither made the Vuelta a España teams selection, either. The teams' disappointment at their non-invitation led to communications with UCI President Pat McQuaid, which may result in reforms to how teams are selected for the Grand Tours.

== Pre-race favorites ==
The Giro was often described as being wide open in terms of who had the best chance to win it. This is because many notable riders, including the past three champions, did not enter. 2007 Giro d'Italia champion Danilo Di Luca, who originally finished second in the 2009 Giro d'Italia, was suspended by his national federation in February for a doping incident in the 2009 Giro. 2008 Giro d'Italia champion Alberto Contador skipped the Giro to better focus on the Tour de France, as he also had in the previous season. After first indicating that he might defend his championship, 2009 champion Denis Menchov also announced that he would not ride the Giro, instead focusing on the Tour de France, in order to complete the career sweep of the Grand Tours. Lance Armstrong and Levi Leipheimer, leaders of the Astana squad in the 2009 Giro, announced in October 2009 that they would ride the partially concurrent Tour of California instead of the Giro, which is why Team RadioShack was not selected for the Giro.

Just five days before the race began, the UCI announced several riders were under suspicion of doping by virtue of irregular values in their biological passports. Among them was Franco Pellizotti, who had been set to be one of the leaders for the Liquigas–Doimo team and had been described as a pre-race favorite. While team firmly stood behind Pellizotti in the case and expressed anger that the UCI unveiled their findings so close to the start of the Giro, they obligingly pulled him from their squad. He was replaced by Vincenzo Nibali, who had been planning to ride the Tour of California as a squad leader. While not an overall favorite, Alessandro Ballan intended to participate in the race, stating in October that it was a certainty he would start, after missing out on the Giro in 2009 when he was world champion. This was an indication well in advance that the BMC Racing Team was in line for an invite to the race. Ballan was later suspended by his team as a result of an internal doping investigation, meaning he had to miss the Giro. He was later cleared of any wrongdoing.

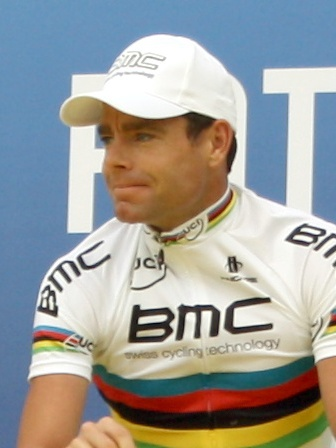
World champion Cadel Evans was one of the strongest pre-race favorites.

Most pre-race analyses identified Ivan Basso, Cadel Evans, and Carlos Sastre as the major favorites to win the overall classification, with Evans perhaps the consensus pick. Basso and Sastre had both ridden the Giro in 2009 and come away finishing in the top five. Sastre also won two difficult mountain stages in the race's final week, and was noted as a rider who gets stronger as a race goes along, making the Giro's very climbing-intensive third week possibly sit in his favor. Evans had finished on a Grand Tour podium in each of the past three seasons, including in the most recent three-week event, the 2009 Vuelta a España. He also entered the race as the reigning world cycling champion and had had a successful 2010 season to date, with a win in La Flèche Wallonne and a podium finish in the Tirreno–Adriatico. Neither Basso nor Sastre had raced much in the 2010 season prior to the Giro. Other riders named as contenders included Bradley Wiggins, former Giro winners Damiano Cunego and Stefano Garzelli, Alexander Vinokourov, Marzio Bruseghin, Christian Vande Velde, Domenico Pozzovivo, David Moncoutié, and Michele Scarponi. Race director Angelo Zomegnan also named Basso, Evans, and Sastre as his three favorites, and included Wiggins and Linus Gerdemann as possible darkhorses.

Mark Cavendish and Daniele Bennati, stage winners in the past two editions of the Giro, were absent from this race, but several top sprinters took the start in Amsterdam. These included Tyler Farrar, André Greipel, and Alessandro Petacchi, all of whom had themselves won Grand Tour stages in 2009 and figured to be top favorites for the Giro's flat stages. Former Tour de France points classification winner Óscar Freire intended to make his Giro debut in this race, but he pulled out due to sinusitis shortly before the race started. Other sprinters in the Giro peloton included Robbie McEwen, Freire's teammate Graeme Brown, Baden Cooke, Leonardo Duque, Sebastian Haedo, Wouter Weylandt, and Greg Henderson.

== Route and stages ==
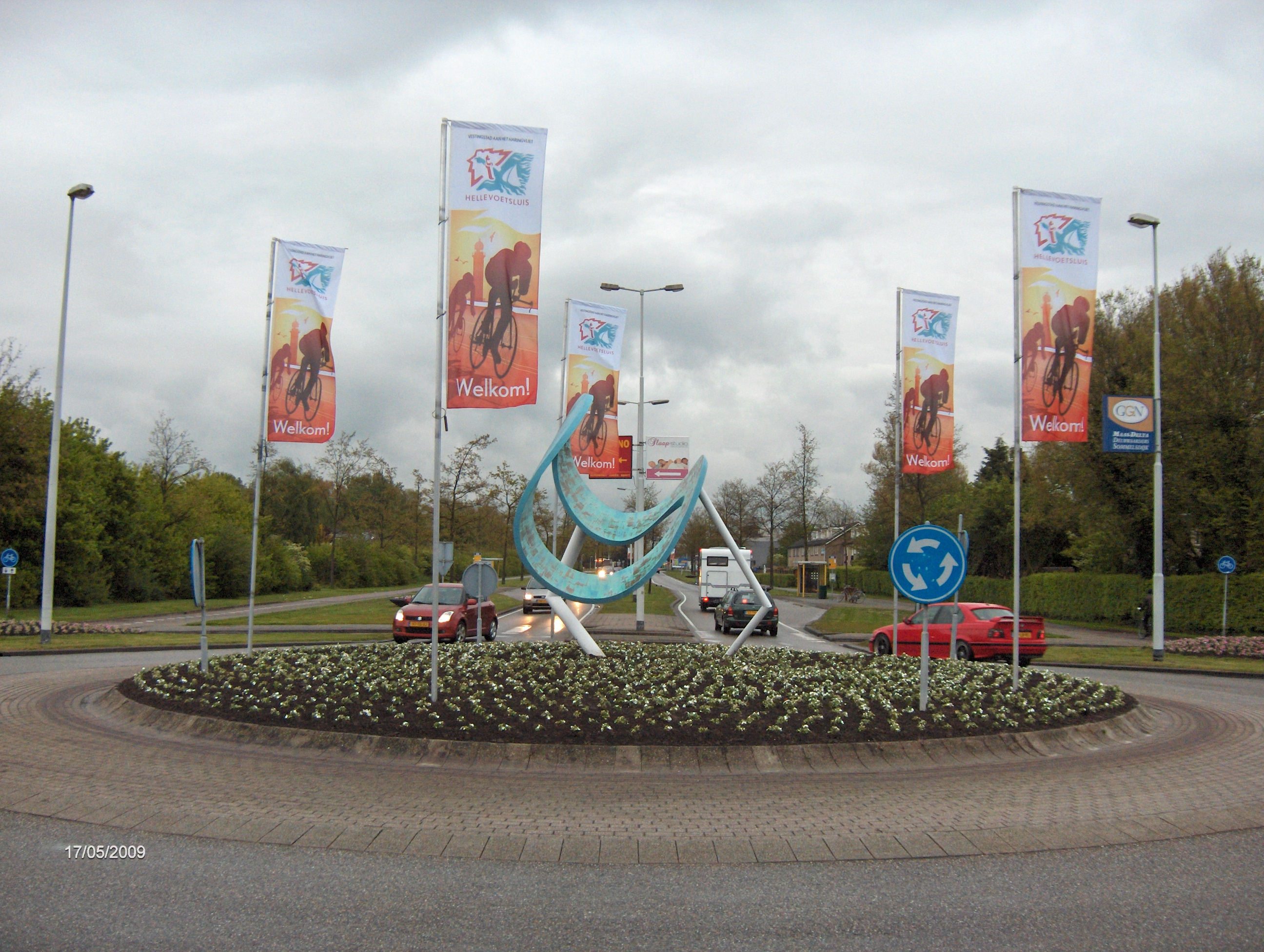
Hellevoetsluis, one of the Dutch cities the peloton rode through on its way to Middelburg in stage 3. The text on the flag says Welkom!, meaning welcome!

The Giro's 21 stages were divided into the following classifications by race organizers Gazzetta dello Sport: four time trials (three individual and one team), seven flat stages, five mixed stages, and six mountain stages. The race began in the Netherlands, the ninth time in the Giro's history that the race began outside Italy, and the first since 2006's start in Belgium. A short individual time trial and two flat stages were held there. Starting the race away from Italy meant that an early rest day, coming just three days into the 23-day race, was necessary to transfer to Italy. The first stage upon entering Italy was a team time trial, the fifth consecutive year that discipline had featured in the Giro. Stage 7 visited Tuscany and was raced partly on unpaved roads used yearly in the Italian semi-classic Montepaschi Strade Bianche. The course honored Italian cycling legends Gino Bartali, Fausto Coppi, and Costante Girardengo by passing through their hometowns in the first road race stages in Italy.

Five stages ended with climbs, with most coming in the race's last week. The first was stage 8 to Monte Terminillo, a 16.1 km (10.0 mi) long climb gaining 1,672 m (5,486 ft) of vertical elevation for an average gradient of 7.3 percent, one of the most difficult climbs in the Apennine Mountains in the region of Abruzzo. The next was Monte Zoncolan in the Carnic Alps, which at 10.5 km (6.5 mi) in length was shorter than some of the other climbs in the race, but with 1,210 m (3,970 ft) of vertical gain in that time, its 20 percent maximum gradient made it one of the most difficult. The Stage 16 individual time trial went to Plan de Corones, on a course identical to the one used in the 2008 Giro d'Italia. In 12.9 km (8.0 mi), this stage gained over 1,000 m (3,300 ft) and featured a section with 24 percent gradients in the final kilometer. The Giro's last two road race stages were especially climbing-intensive, including the Passo del Mortirolo, rising 1,250 m (4,100 ft) in 12.8 km (8.0 mi) for an average gradient of 10 percent, and the Passo di Gavia, known for being climbed during the 1988 Giro d'Italia in the middle of a driving blizzard. The Gavia was also the Cima Coppi, the race's highest point, and Stage 20, in which it featured, was considered the queen stage. Other climbs during the race included the Passo del Bratello, Monte Grappa, the Passo delle Palade, the Passo di Santa Cristina, the Forcola di Livigno, and the last climb of the race, the Passo del Tonale. Most of these climbs also featured difficult descents.

The route was noted to appeal to many types of riders, be they climbers, sprinters, or time trialists. The race had seven flat stages which figured into end in mass sprints, and the hilly mixed stages were inviting for breakaways. Sastre, one of the first riders to announce he would ride the Giro, commented that the route was much harder than that of the 2009 Giro, and would demand a very strong climber to be its champion. Zomegnan concurred that the route favored climbers, noting that the distance spent time trialing was not great and that it would take errors from climbing specialists to allow a rider better suited for time trialing to be Giro champion.

Stage characteristics and winners
Stage	Date	Course	Distance	Type	Winner
1	8 May	Amsterdam (Netherlands)	8.4 km (5.2 mi)	Individual time trial	Bradley Wiggins (GBR)
2	9 May	Amsterdam to Utrecht (Netherlands)	209 km (130 mi)	Flat stage	Tyler Farrar (USA)
3	10 May	Amsterdam to Middelburg (Netherlands)	224 km (139 mi)	Flat stage	Wouter Weylandt (BEL)
	11 May	Rest day (Savigliano)			
4	12 May	Savigliano to Cuneo	32.5 km (20.2 mi)	Team time trial	Liquigas–Doimo
5	13 May	Novara to Novi Ligure	168 km (104 mi)	Flat stage	Jérôme Pineau (FRA)
6	14 May	Fidenza to Marina di Carrara	166 km (103 mi)	Mixed stage	Matthew Lloyd (AUS)
7	15 May	Carrara to Montalcino	215 km (134 mi)	Mixed stage	Cadel Evans (AUS)
8	16 May	Chianciano to Monte Terminillo	189 km (117 mi)	Mountain stage	Chris Anker Sørensen (DEN)
9	17 May	Frosinone to Cava de' Tirreni	188 km (117 mi)	Flat stage	Matthew Goss (AUS)
10	18 May	Avellino to Bitonto	220 km (137 mi)	Flat stage	Tyler Farrar (USA)
11	19 May	Lucera to L'Aquila	256 km (159 mi)	Mixed stage	Evgeni Petrov (RUS)
12	20 May	Città Sant'Angelo to Porto Recanati	191 km (119 mi)	Flat stage	Filippo Pozzato (ITA)
13	21 May	Porto Recanati to Cesenatico	222 km (138 mi)	Mixed stage	Manuel Belletti (ITA)
14	22 May	Ferrara to Asolo (Monte Grappa)	201 km (125 mi)	Mountain stage	Vincenzo Nibali (ITA)
15	23 May	Mestre to Zoncolan	161 km (100 mi)	Mountain stage	Ivan Basso (ITA)
	24 May	Rest day (Mareo)			
16	25 May	Mareo to Plan de Corones	12.9 km (8.0 mi)	Individual time trial	Stefano Garzelli (ITA)
17	26 May	Bruneck to Peio Terme	173 km (107 mi)	Mixed stage	Damien Monier (FRA)
18	27 May	Levico Terme to Brescia	151 km (94 mi)	Flat stage	André Greipel (GER)
19	28 May	Brescia to Aprica	195 km (121 mi)	Mountain stage	Michele Scarponi (ITA)
20	29 May	Bormio to Passo del Tonale	178 km (111 mi)	Mountain stage	Johann Tschopp (SUI)
21	30 May	Verona	15.3 km (9.5 mi)	Individual time trial	Gustav Larsson (SWE)
	TOTAL		3,418 km (2,124 mi)		

== Race overview ==
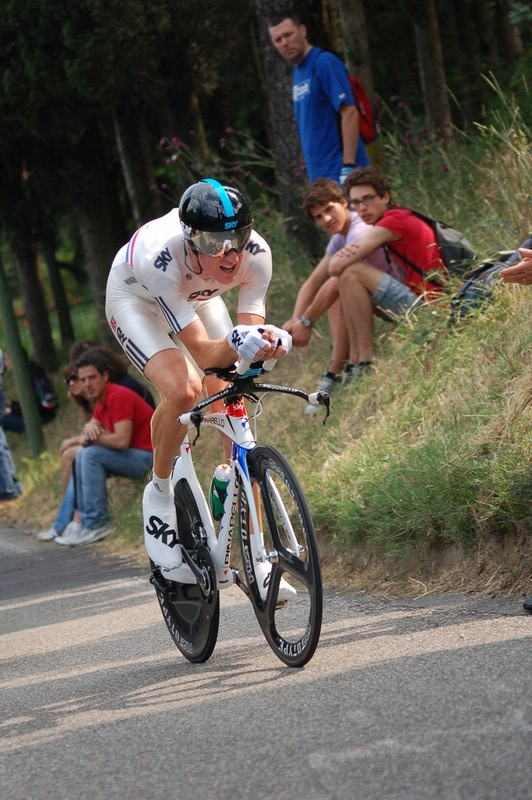
Bradley Wiggins of Team Sky won the stage 1 time trial. Pictured on stage 21.

The Giro began in Amsterdam with an individual time trial. Favorites for the stage included two British riders, Team Sky captain Bradley Wiggins and Garmin–Transitions' David Millar. Several riders in the Giro peloton considered Wiggins the prohibitive favorite. Wiggins won the stage, securing the first pink jersey. A major surprise on the stage was Grand Tour rookie Brent Bookwalter from BMC Racing Team coming in second, just 2 seconds off Wiggins' winning time. Millar was seventh, 6 seconds back. This set the stage for a turbulent opening to the Giro, as both of the road race stages in the Netherlands featured several crashes. The courses for the road stages in the Netherlands were noted to have a lot of street furniture on them, which combined with the riders' nerves on the first day of a three-week Grand Tour as well as crosswinds from the North Sea to make the first mass-start stages very perilous. Tyler Farrar, Carlos Sastre, Christian Vande Velde, Greg Henderson, Wiggins, Alessandro Petacchi, Domenico Pozzovivo, Marzio Bruseghin, Filippo Pozzato, and Gilberto Simoni all fell from their bikes at some point while the Giro was in the Netherlands. There were also many other crashes that took down so many riders it was difficult to keep track of exactly who was effected. Crashing and, consequently, falling away from the leading group on the road, meant different things for different riders. For sprinters like Farrar and Petacchi, crashing meant they were unlikely to be able to contest the finishes for stage wins, while overall contenders like Wiggins and Sastre lost time in the general classification. For the second year in a row, Vandevelde suffered a broken collarbone as a result of his crash, consequently abandoning the race. Despite crashing during stage 2, Farrar got up and was able to win the stage from a depleted field sprint. The state of the roads in the Netherlands and the sheer quantity of crashes that took place there incurred much criticism and questions over whether they should be included in a Grand Tour. Cadel Evans and Alexander Vinokourov both took the pink jersey while the Giro was in the Netherlands. Vinokourov held it prior to the transfer to Italy, with six riders from three teams within 10 seconds of him, meaning the pink jersey still remained very much in flux.

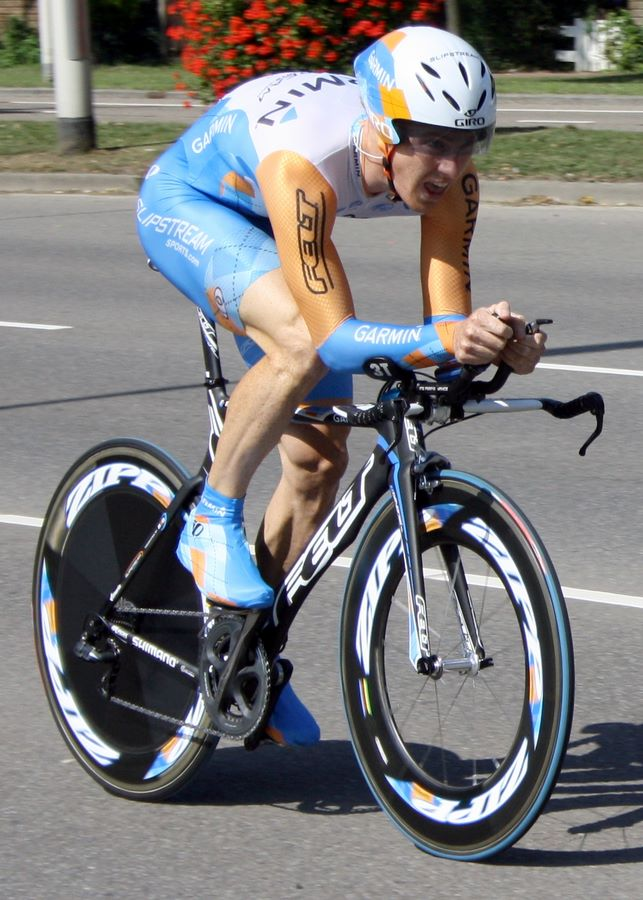
Garmin–Transitions sprinter Tyler Farrar was the Giro's only double stage winner.

After the transfer, the first stage in Italy was a team time trial, a race where each member of the squad races against the clock together, and the team's time is taken for the fifth rider to cross the finish line. Liquigas–Doimo was the winning squad, and had a time gap over Vinokourov's Astana team that was sufficiently large enough for Vincenzo Nibali to become the fourth race leader in as many stages. At last, there was stability in the race leadership, as Nibali comfortably retained over the next two stages, both of which featured breakaways taking the day's honors while the peloton finished together. Stage 7 was a major one, incorporating stretches of gravel roads near the finish. The day on which this stage was run also happened to have very heavy rainfall, making the course muddy and dangerous. Much like had happened in the Netherlands, a great many riders crashed in this stage, perhaps chief among them Wiggins and Sastre, who both lost more than four minutes. Nibali also crashed, and upon seeing this, Alexander Vinokourov, Damiano Cunego, and Cadel Evans broke free of the leading group. Evans won the stage, one of many riders to cross the finish line covered in mud, and Vinokourov took back the race leadership. Through the first mountain stage and two flat stages that followed, the overall standings did not change much, and Vinokourov retained the jersey.

Stage 11 into L'Aquila provided for major changes to the overall standings. More than 50 riders formed the day's escape group, and they quickly took 20 minutes advantage. Among them were Sastre, Wiggins, and Team Saxo Bank's Richie Porte, who was holding the white jersey as best young rider and, at sixth overall, was the best-placed man in the group. Sastre, Wiggins, and Porte all had multiple support riders with them in the breakaway who set strenuous paces to keep the group away. The main field, containing the Giro's top favorites, pulled back a little time but was still nearly 13 minutes behind stage winner Evgeni Petrov at the finish. The day's result massively shuffled the overall classification. Porte was the only rider who had been in the top ten before the stage who remained there afterward, and took the pink jersey. Sastre and Wiggins, who entered the Giro as contenders but had fallen well back in the overall standings before this stage, both moved back into the top ten.

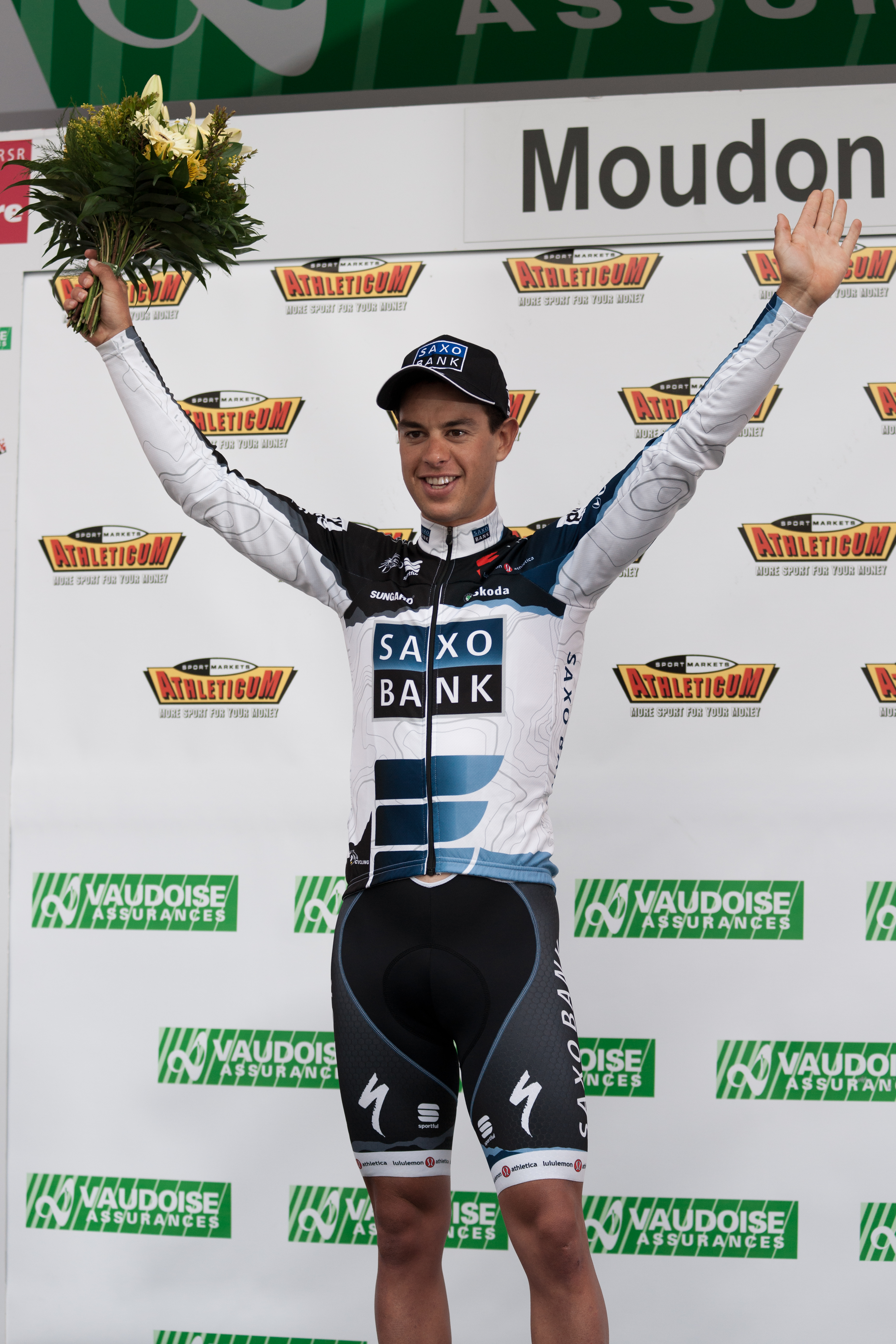
Grand Tour rookie Richie Porte from Team Saxo Bank held the race leadership for a time, and won the young rider classification.

Porte kept the pink jersey for two days, conceding it to David Arroyo, a fellow member of the L'Aquila breakaway, on stage 14 when he could not climb Monte Grappa with the leaders on the day. On this stage, the race's overall favorites began to creep back into the top of the overall classification, as previous race leaders Nibali, Vinokourov, and Evans assumed 8th through 10th in the standings. There were again great changes to the overall classification in stage 15, by way of the climb up Monte Zoncolan. Ivan Basso won the stage and greatly reduced his deficit to Arroyo, though the Spaniard still held the pink jersey after this stage. Evans, Scarponi, Vinokourov, and Nibali also finished well-placed and moved up. Wiggins again fell out of contention, this time conclusively so, by losing 25 minutes on the climb. Evans turned in the best ride of the pre-race favorites in the Plan de Corones time trial, closing his deficit to Basso and moving past Sastre in the overall. After this stage, the only riders left in the top ten from the L'Aquila breakaway were Arroyo, Porte, Sastre, and Robert Kišerlovski, who all finished the Giro in the top ten.

After a stage each for the breakaway and the sprinters, during which there were no major changes to the overall standings, the riders were faced with the very climbing-intensive final two road stages. The Liquigas–Doimo team rode a very hard tempo in stage 19 over the Passo del Mortirolo, which eventually whittled that group down to just Basso, Nibali, and Scarponi. They crossed the Mortirolo more than two minutes ahead of Arroyo, which was nearly enough time to make Basso the virtual race leader. Arroyo, noted as a far better descender than Basso, took very aggressive lines coming down the Mortirolo and caught up with Vinokourov, Sastre, Evans, and John Gadret, who had been between him and the leading trio. Basso's group had only 30 seconds on Arroyo's at the start of the stage-concluding Aprica climb, but they took more and more time as the climb went on and finished three minutes ahead, giving Basso the pink jersey with two days left to race. Arroyo elected not to try to aggressively descend any of the four large climbs on course in the final road race stage, settling for second place by riding with Basso and the other top riders in the peloton most of the day. There were a few changes in time gaps, but the same riders remained in the top ten from the previous day, as Johan Tschopp won the stage from a breakaway. The individual time trial in Verona which closed out the Giro also provided for small changes to the overall, but Basso's 15th place on the stage was easily enough to make him Giro champion. Arroyo and Nibali rounded out the podium.

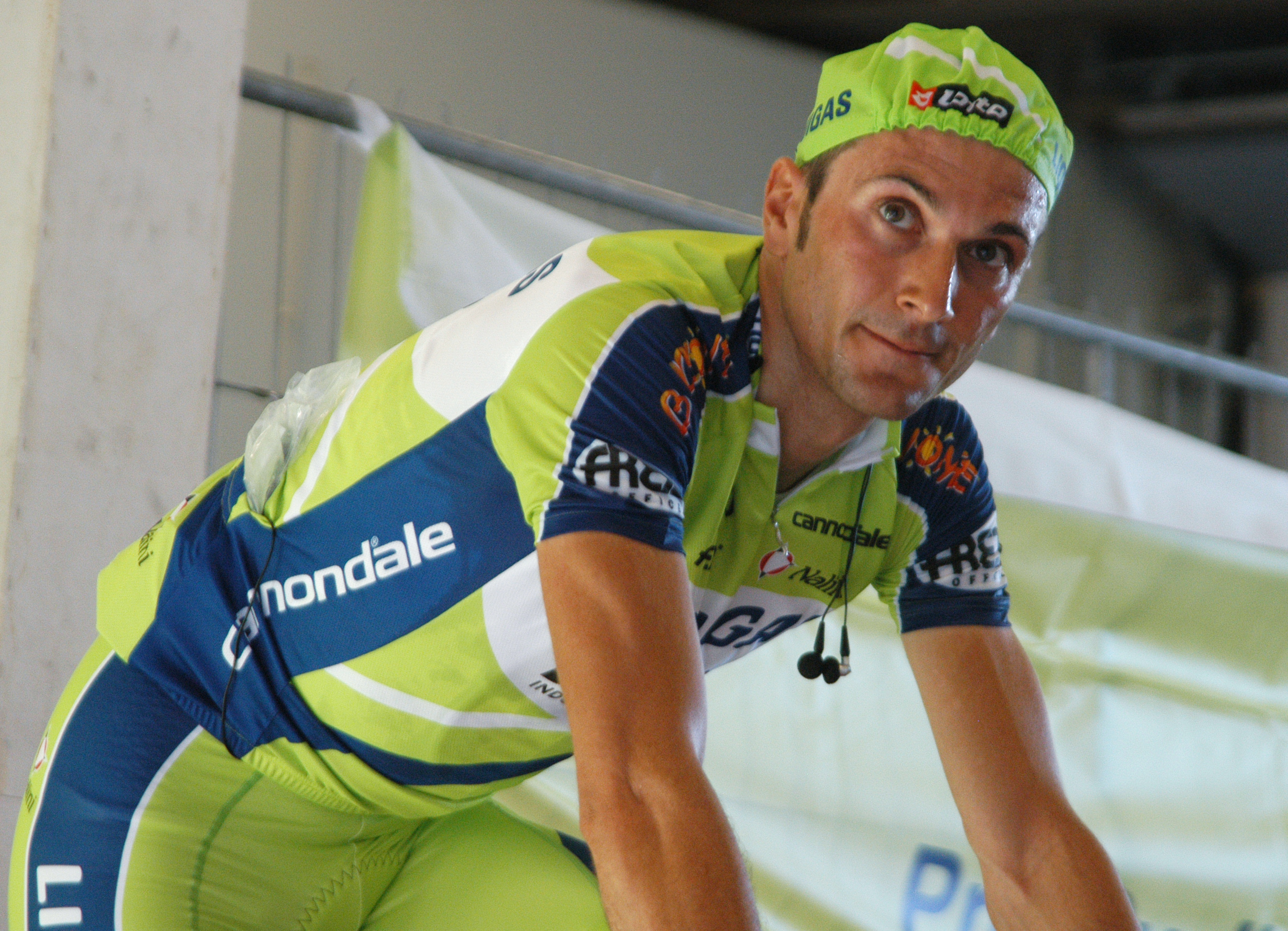
Ivan Basso won the Giro for the second time in his career.

Australian riders won each of the lesser jersey awards. Evans won the points classification, represented in 2010 with a red jersey in a return to the original colour scheme for the three minor classifications that reflected the colours of the Italian flag. Evans's victory came about by way of nine top-ten finishes, including a stage win, over the course of the race. This classification was tightly contested throughout the race; six different riders held the jersey, and it changed hands nine times. Matthew Lloyd of Omega Pharma–Lotto won the green jersey for the mountains classification, taking maximum mountains points during his stage-winning breakaway in stage 6. He made morning breakaways later on in mountain stages to take points on other climbs and consolidate his lead. Porte won the white jersey as best young rider, holding it for all but three stages. Success was widespread among the 22 teams in the race. In sharp contrast to the 2009 Giro, the only rider to win multiple stages in this year's race was Farrar, who took the sprint finishes to stages 2 and 10. Team Sky, Omega Pharma–Lotto, BMC Racing Team, Colnago–CSF Inox, Acqua & Sapone, Cofidis, Androni Giocattoli, and Bbox Bouygues Telecom each won one stage. Quick-Step had two stage wins, first with Wouter Weylandt in a depleted sprint finish to stage 3 in the Netherlands, and two stages later Jérôme Pineau led a winning breakaway across the finish line. Team Saxo Bank's Chris Anker Sørensen won stage 8 on Monte Terminillo after figuring into a morning breakaway, and their time trial specialist Gustav Larsson won the final race against the clock in Verona. Team HTC–Columbia won multiple sprint stages, first with leadout man Matthew Goss when ace sprinter André Greipel missed out on the opportunity, and later Greipel himself took a win. Team Katusha took back-to-back stage wins, first with Petrov in L'Aquila and then with Filippo Pozzato, who won a 10-man sprint after a late breakaway in stage 12. After there had been no Italian stage winners for the first 11 days of racing, Pozzato's stage win was the first of five in a row and six overall for Italian riders. Nibali and Basso were among those stage winners; as they also won the stage 4 team time trial, theirs was the only squad with more than two stage wins. They also won both teams classifications, the time-based Trofeo Fast Team and the points-based Trofeo Super Team. Astana, Caisse d'Epargne, and Rabobank did not win any stages, but Vinokourov's and Arroyo's stints in the pink jersey and Tom Stamsnijder's win in the Traguardo Volante classification meant that they did not come away from the Giro empty-handed. Only Ag2r–La Mondiale, Cervélo TestTeam, Footon–Servetto–Fuji, Lampre–Farnese Vini, and Team Milram came away from the Giro with nothing, even though Milram had one of their riders (Paul Voss) wearing the Mountains jersey at some point.

== Classification leadership ==
In the 2010 Giro d'Italia, four different jerseys were awarded. For the general classification, calculated by adding each cyclist's finishing times on each stage, and allowing time bonuses for the first three finishers on mass-start stages, the leader received a pink jersey. This classification was considered the most important of the Giro d'Italia, and the winner was considered the winner of the Giro.

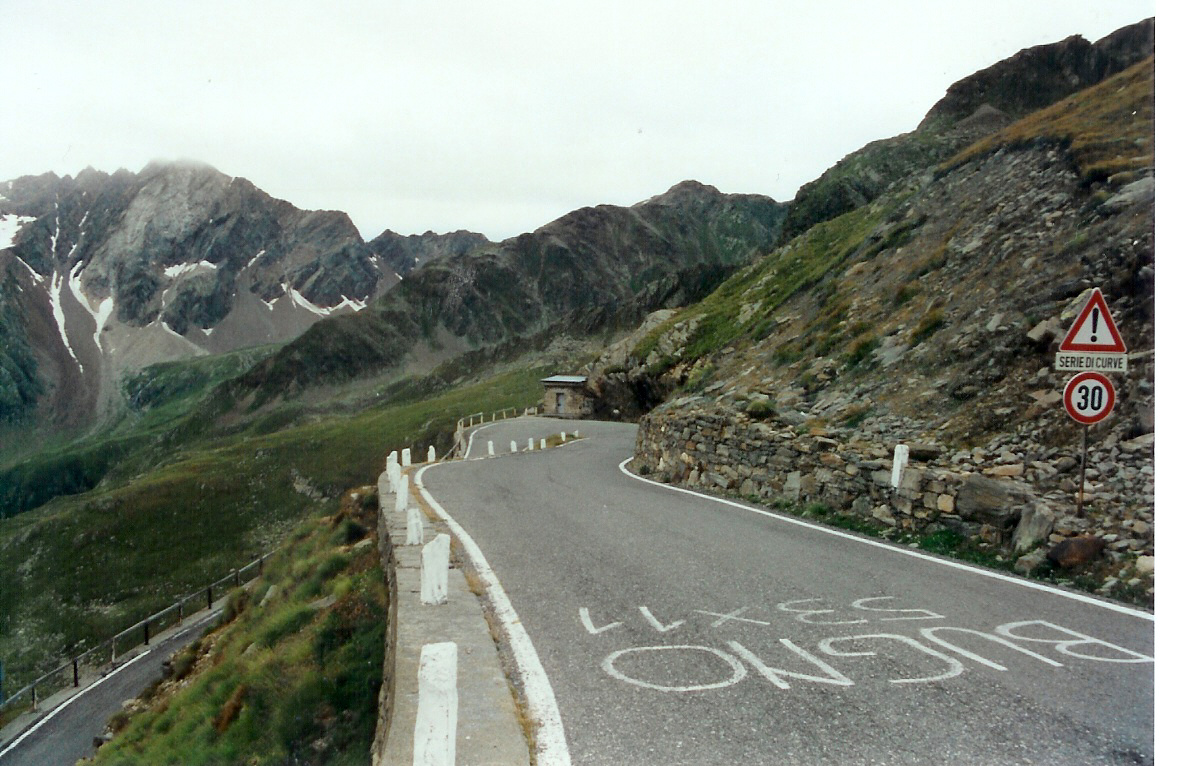
The Passo di Gavia, the highest point reached in the 2010 Giro d'Italia

Additionally, there was a points classification, which awarded a red jersey. In the points classification, cyclists got points for finishing in the top 15 in a stage. Unlike in the better known points classification in the Tour de France, the type of stage had no effect on what points were on offer – each stage had the same points available on the same scale. The win earned 25 points, second place earned 20 points, third 16, fourth 14, fifth 12, sixth 10, and one point fewer per place down to a single point for 15th. In addition, points could be won in intermediate sprints.

There was also a mountains classification, the leadership of which was marked by a green jersey. In the mountains classifications, points were won by reaching the top of a climb before other cyclists. Each climb was categorized as either first, second, or third category, with more points available for the higher-categorized climbs. The Cima Coppi, the race's highest point of elevation, awarded still more points than the other first-category climbs.

The fourth jersey represented the young rider classification, marked by a white jersey. This was decided the same way as the general classification, but only riders born after 1 January 1985 were eligible.

There were also three classifications for teams. In the Trofeo Fast Team classification, the times of the best three cyclists per team on each stage were added; the leading team was the team with the lowest total time; the Trofeo Super Team was a team points classification, with the top 20 placed riders on each stage earning points (20 for first place, 19 for second place and so on, down to a single point for 20th) for their team; and the Fair Play classification rewarded those teams that best avoided penalty points for minor technical infringements.

The rows in the following table correspond to the jerseys awarded after that stage was run.

Classification leadership by stage
Stage	Winner	General classification	Points classification	Mountains classification	Young rider classification
1	Bradley Wiggins	Bradley Wiggins	Bradley Wiggins	not awarded	Richie Porte
2	Tyler Farrar	Cadel Evans	Tyler Farrar	Paul Voss	Richie Porte
3	Wouter Weylandt	Alexander Vinokourov	Graeme Brown	Paul Voss	Richie Porte
4	Liquigas–Doimo	Vincenzo Nibali	Graeme Brown	Paul Voss	Valerio Agnoli
5	Jérôme Pineau	Vincenzo Nibali	Jérôme Pineau	Paul Voss	Valerio Agnoli
6	Matthew Lloyd	Vincenzo Nibali	Tyler Farrar	Matthew Lloyd	Valerio Agnoli
7	Cadel Evans	Alexander Vinokourov	Tyler Farrar	Matthew Lloyd	Richie Porte
8	Chris Anker Sørensen	Alexander Vinokourov	Cadel Evans	Matthew Lloyd	Richie Porte
9	Matthew Goss	Alexander Vinokourov	Tyler Farrar	Matthew Lloyd	Richie Porte
10	Tyler Farrar	Alexander Vinokourov	Tyler Farrar	Matthew Lloyd	Richie Porte
11	Evgeni Petrov	Richie Porte	Tyler Farrar	Matthew Lloyd	Richie Porte
12	Filippo Pozzato	Richie Porte	Jérôme Pineau	Matthew Lloyd	Richie Porte
13	Manuel Belletti	Richie Porte	Jérôme Pineau	Matthew Lloyd	Richie Porte
14	Vincenzo Nibali	David Arroyo	Alexander Vinokourov	Matthew Lloyd	Richie Porte
15	Ivan Basso	David Arroyo	Cadel Evans	Matthew Lloyd	Richie Porte
16	Stefano Garzelli	David Arroyo	Cadel Evans	Matthew Lloyd	Richie Porte
17	Damien Monier	David Arroyo	Cadel Evans	Matthew Lloyd	Richie Porte
18	André Greipel	David Arroyo	Cadel Evans	Matthew Lloyd	Richie Porte
19	Michele Scarponi	Ivan Basso	Cadel Evans	Ivan Basso	Richie Porte
20	Johann Tschopp	Ivan Basso	Cadel Evans	Matthew Lloyd	Richie Porte
21	Gustav Larsson	Ivan Basso	Cadel Evans	Matthew Lloyd	Richie Porte
Final		Ivan Basso	Cadel Evans	Matthew Lloyd	Richie Porte

== Final standings ==
Legend
A pink jersey	Denotes the winner of the General classification	A green jersey	Denotes the winner of the Mountains classification
A red jersey	Denotes the winner of the Points classification	A white jersey	Denotes the winner of the Young rider classification

=== General classification ===
	Rider	Team	Time
1	Ivan Basso (ITA)	Liquigas–Doimo	87h 44' 01"
2	David Arroyo (ESP)	Caisse d'Epargne	+ 1' 51"
3	Vincenzo Nibali (ITA)	Liquigas–Doimo	+ 2' 37"
4	Michele Scarponi (ITA)	Androni Giocattoli	+ 2' 50"
5	Cadel Evans (AUS)	BMC Racing Team	+ 3' 27"
6	Alexander Vinokourov (KAZ)	Astana	+ 7' 06"
7	Richie Porte (AUS)	Team Saxo Bank	+ 7' 22"
8	Carlos Sastre (ESP)	Cervélo TestTeam	+ 9' 39"
9	Marco Pinotti (ITA)	Team HTC–Columbia	+ 14' 20"
10	Robert Kišerlovski (CRO)	Liquigas–Doimo	+ 14' 51"

=== Points classification ===
	Rider	Team	Points
1	Cadel Evans (AUS)	BMC Racing Team	150
2	Alexander Vinokourov (KAZ)	Astana	128
3	Vincenzo Nibali (ITA)	Liquigas–Doimo	116
4	Michele Scarponi (ITA)	Androni Giocattoli	110
5	Ivan Basso (ITA)	Liquigas–Doimo	105
6	Marco Pinotti (ITA)	Team HTC–Columbia	74
7	Jérôme Pineau (FRA)	Quick-Step	69
8	Filippo Pozzato (ITA)	Team Katusha	67
9	Damiano Cunego (ITA)	Lampre–Farnese Vini	64
10	John Gadret (FRA)	Ag2r–La Mondiale	64

=== Mountains classification ===
	Rider	Team	Points
1	Matthew Lloyd (AUS)	Omega Pharma–Lotto	56
2	Ivan Basso (ITA)	Liquigas–Doimo	41
3	Johann Tschopp (SUI)	Bbox Bouygues Telecom	38
4	Cadel Evans (AUS)	BMC Racing Team	35
5	Michele Scarponi (ITA)	Androni Giocattoli	25
6	Ludovic Turpin (FRA)	Ag2r–La Mondiale	20
7	Rubens Bertogliati (SUI)	Androni Giocattoli	16
8	Simone Stortoni (ITA)	Colnago–CSF Inox	16
9	Alexander Vinokourov (KAZ)	Astana	15
10	Vincenzo Nibali (ITA)	Liquigas–Doimo	15

=== Young rider classification ===
	Rider	Team	Time
1	Richie Porte (AUS)	Team Saxo Bank	87h 51' 23"
2	Robert Kišerlovski (CRO)	Liquigas–Doimo	+ 7' 29"
3	Bauke Mollema (NED)	Rabobank	+ 12' 19"
4	Steven Kruijswijk (NED)	Rabobank	+ 30' 05"
5	Francis De Greef (BEL)	Omega Pharma–Lotto	+ 42' 46"
6	Valerio Agnoli (ITA)	Liquigas–Doimo	+ 1h 20' 30"
7	Rigoberto Urán (COL)	Caisse d'Epargne	+ 1h 29' 44"
8	Jan Bakelants (BEL)	Omega Pharma–Lotto	+ 1h 30' 18"
9	Marcel Wyss (SUI)	Cervélo TestTeam	+ 1h 37' 33"
10	Branislau Samoilau (BLR)	Quick-Step	+ 1h 38' 40"

=== Trofeo Fast Team classification ===
	Team	Time
1	Liquigas–Doimo	262h 04' 40"
2	Rabobank	+ 24' 21"
3	Caisse d'Epargne	+ 1h 05' 55"
4	Ag2r–La Mondiale	+ 1h 10' 16"
5	Omega Pharma–Lotto	+ 1h 10' 45"
6	Team Saxo Bank	+ 1h 42' 45"
7	Cervélo TestTeam	+ 2h 06' 16"
8	Androni Giocattoli	+ 2h 22' 33"
9	Team Katusha	+ 2h 23' 30"
10	Bbox Bouygues Telecom	+ 2h 31' 15"

=== Trofeo Super Team classification ===
	Team	Points
1	Liquigas–Doimo	412
2	Team HTC–Columbia	281
3	Rabobank	263
4	Lampre–Farnese Vini	251
5	Team Sky	235
6	Ag2r–La Mondiale	221
7	BMC Racing Team	217
8	Team Saxo Bank	217
9	Astana	216
10	Garmin–Transitions	214

=== Minor classifications ===
Other less well-known classifications, whose leaders did not receive a special jersey, were awarded during the Giro. These awards were based on points earned throughout the three weeks of the tour. Each mass-start stage had one intermediate sprint, the Traguardo Volante, or T.V. The T.V. gave bonus seconds towards the general classification, points towards the regular points classification, and also points towards the T.V. classification. This award was known in previous years as the "Intergiro" and the "Expo Milano 2015" classification. It was won by Tom Stamsnijder of the Rabobank team.

Other awards included the Combativity classification, which was a compilation of points gained for position on crossing intermediate sprints, mountain passes and stage finishes. Mountains classification winner Matthew Lloyd won this award. The Azzurri d'Italia classification was based on finishing order, but points were awarded only to the top three finishers in each stage. It was won, like the closely associated points classification, by Cadel Evans. Additionally, the Premio della Fuga rewarded riders who took part in a breakaway at the head of the field, each rider in an escape of ten or fewer riders getting one point for each kilometre that the group stayed clear. Quick-Step's Jérôme Pineau was first in this competition. Teams were given penalty points for minor technical infringements. Liquigas–Doimo was most successful in avoiding penalties, and so won the Fair Play classification.

=== World Rankings points ===
The Giro was one of 26 events throughout the season that contributed points towards the 2010 UCI World Ranking. Points were awarded to the top 20 finishers overall, and to the top five finishers in each stage.

Points earned in the Giro d'Italia
Name	Team	Points
Ivan Basso (ITA)	Liquigas–Doimo	206
David Arroyo (ESP)	Caisse d'Epargne	132
Cadel Evans (AUS)	BMC Racing Team	128
Vincenzo Nibali (ITA)	Liquigas–Doimo	123
Michele Scarponi (ITA)	Androni Giocattoli	117
Alexander Vinokourov (KAZ)	Astana	85
Richie Porte (AUS)	Team Saxo Bank	60
Carlos Sastre (ESP)	Cervélo TestTeam	56
Marco Pinotti (ITA)	Team HTC–Columbia	54

Damiano Cunego (ITA)	Lampre–Farnese Vini	42
Tyler Farrar (USA)	Garmin–Transitions	38
Robert Kišerlovski (CRO)	Liquigas–Doimo	38
John Gadret (FRA)	Ag2r–La Mondiale	28
Bauke Mollema (NED)	Rabobank	26
Filippo Pozzato (ITA)	Team Katusha	25
Matthew Goss (AUS)	Team HTC–Columbia	24
Jérome Pineau (FRA)	Quick-Step	20
André Greipel (GER)	Team HTC–Columbia	18
Stefano Garzelli (ITA)	Acqua & Sapone	18
Vladimir Karpets (RUS)	Team Katusha	18
Evgeni Petrov (RUS)	Team Katusha	18
Bradley Wiggins (GBR)	Team Sky	18
Manuel Belletti (ITA)	Colnago–CSF Inox	18
Gustav Larsson (SWE)	Team Saxo Bank	16
Chris Anker Sørensen (DEN)	Team Saxo Bank	16
Johann Tschopp (SUI)	Bbox Bouygues Telecom	16
Matthew Lloyd (AUS)	Omega Pharma–Lotto	16
Damien Monier (FRA)	Cofidis	16
Danilo Hondo (GER)	Lampre–Farnese Vini	15
Wouter Weylandt (BEL)	Quick-Step	14
Mauricio Ardila (COL)	Rabobank	14
Greg Henderson (NZ)	Team Sky	12
Fabio Sabatini (ITA)	Liquigas–Doimo	12
Julian Dean (NZ)	Garmin–Transitions	12
Linus Gerdemann (GER)	Team Milram	10
Steven Kruijswijk (NED)	Rabobank	10
Thomas Voeckler (FRA)	Bbox Bouygues Telecom	8
Graeme Brown (AUS)	Rabobank	8
Dario Cataldo (ITA)	Quick-Step	8
Dario Cioni (ITA)	Team Sky	8
Rubens Bertogliati (SUI)	Androni Giocattoli	8
Simone Stortoni (ITA)	Colnago–CSF Inox	8
Brent Bookwalter (USA)	BMC Racing Team	8
Julien Fouchard (FRA)	Cofidis	8
Robert Förster (GER)	Team Milram	7
Alexander Efimkin (RUS)	Ag2r–La Mondiale	5
Xavier Tondó (ESP)	Cervélo TestTeam	4
Iban Mayoz (ESP)	Footon–Servetto–Fuji	4
Tiziano Dall'Antonia (ITA)	Liquigas–Doimo	4
Yukiya Arashiro (JPN)	Bbox Bouygues Telecom	4
Robbie McEwen (AUS)	Team Katusha	2
Hubert Dupont (FRA)	Ag2r–La Mondiale	2
Daniel Moreno (ESP)	Omega Pharma–Lotto	2
Steve Cummings (GBR)	Team Sky	1
Sebastian Lang (GER)	Omega Pharma–Lotto	1
Adam Blythe (GBR)	Omega Pharma–Lotto	1
Federico Canuti (ITA)	Colnago–CSF Inox	1

Top ten of the individual standings after the Giro d'Italia (Note: Alejandro Valverde was originally first on this list, but shortly after the Giro all his results from 2010 were vacated due to his suspension.)
Rank	Prev.	Name	Team	Points
1	3	Cadel Evans (AUS)	BMC Racing Team	384
2	1	Philippe Gilbert (BEL)	Omega Pharma–Lotto	304
3	2	Joaquim Rodríguez (ESP)	Team Katusha	288
4	4	Luis León Sánchez (ESP)	Caisse d'Epargne	232
5	5	Tom Boonen (BEL)	Quick-Step	216
6	—	Ivan Basso (ITA)	Liquigas–Doimo	206
7	25	Michele Scarponi (ITA)	Androni Giocattoli	203
8	6	Fabian Cancellara (SUI)	Team Saxo Bank	200
9	20	Alexander Vinokourov (KAZ)	Astana	185
10	7	Alberto Contador (ESP)	Astana	167
