= Matthew Lloyd (cyclist) =

Australian road bicycle racer

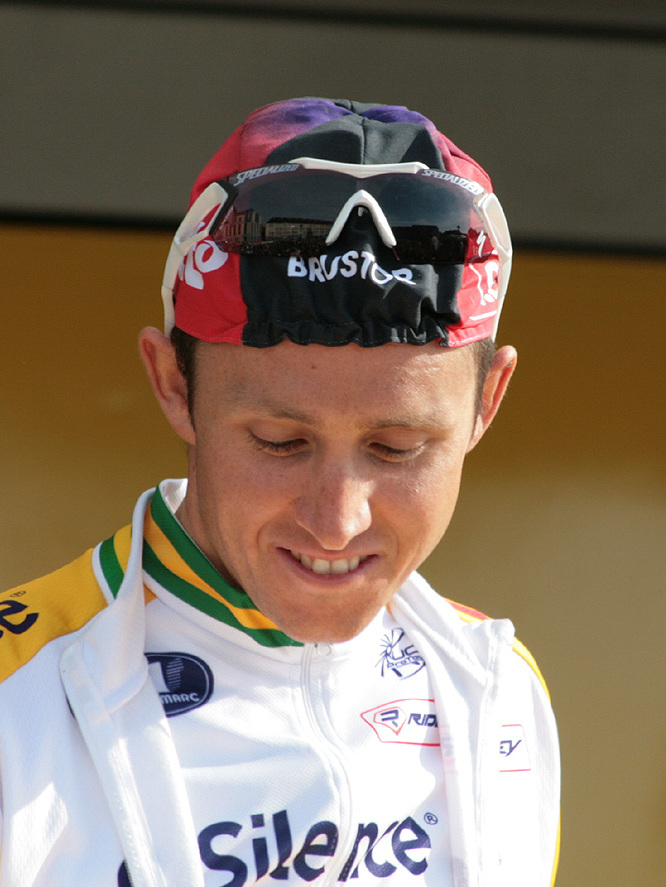
- Lloyd at the 2008 Liège–Bastogne–Liège

Personal information
- Full name: Matthew Lloyd
- Born: 24 May 1983 (age 43) Melbourne, Australia
- Height: 1.71 m (5 ft 7 in)
- Weight: 62 kg (137 lb)

Cycling career
- Sport: Cycling
- Discipline: Road
- Role: Rider
- Rider type: Climbing specialist

Professional teams
- 2007–2011: Predictor–Lotto
- 2012–2013: Lampre–ISD
- 2014: Jelly Belly–Maxxis

Major wins
- Grand Tours Giro d'Italia Mountains classification (2010) 1 individual stage (2010) One day races and Classics National Road Race Championships (2008)

Matthew Lloyd (born 24 May 1983) is an Australian former professional road bicycle racer, who rode professionally between 2007 and 2014. Lloyd is the first Australian cyclist to win a King of the Mountains competition in a grand tour.

== Career ==
He turned professional in 2007 with the Predictor–Lotto team, after riding for the SouthAustralia.com–AIS team. He was an Australian Institute of Sport scholarship holder.

Lloyd was released by Omega Pharma–Lotto in April 2011 for "behavioural reasons" rather than a drug problem. Lloyd signed a two-year deal with Lampre–ISD in November 2011.

== Major results ==
2004
9th Overall Herald Sun Tour

1st Stage 12

2005
1st National Under-23 Criterium Championships
1st Overall Tour of Wellington

1st Stage 5

3rd Grafton–Inverell
7th Overall Herald Sun Tour
2006
1st Trofeo Alcide Degasperi
1st Stage 5 Tour of Japan
Herald Sun Tour

1st Mountains classification
1st Stage 5

1st Stage 5 Tour of Wellington
3rd Overall Girobio
5th GP Capodarco
2007
4th Overall Tour Down Under
2008
1st Road race, National Road Championships
4th Giro dell'Emilia
7th Overall Settimana Internazionale di Coppi e Bartali
2010
Giro d'Italia

1st Mountains classification
1st Stage 6

2012
2nd Road race, National Road Championships

=== Grand Tour general classification results timeline ===
Grand Tour	2007	2008	2009	2010	2011	2012
Giro d'Italia	61	30	—	50	70	—
Tour de France	—	—	46	47	—	DNF
Vuelta a España	—	DNF	50	—	—	—

Legend
—	Did not compete
DNF	Did not finish
