= Laurent Lefèvre =

French cyclist (born 1976)

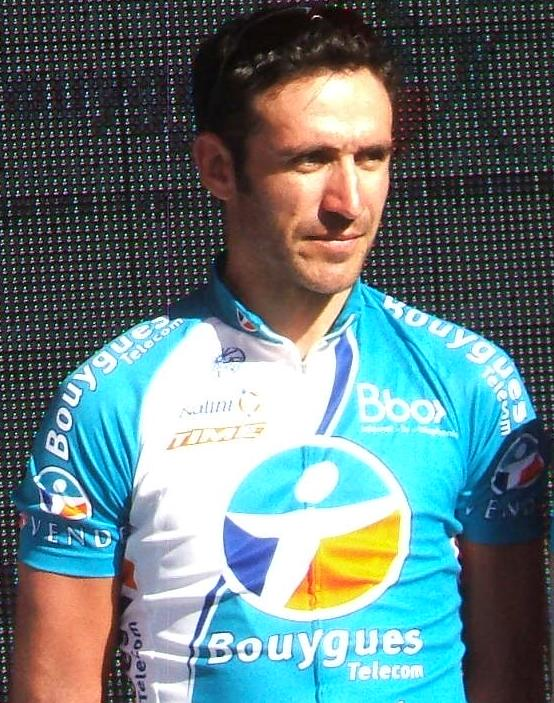

Personal information
- Full name: Laurent Lefèvre
- Born: 2 July 1976 (age 50) Maubeuge, France
- Height: 1.80 m (5 ft 11 in)
- Weight: 67 kg (148 lb)

Cycling career
- Sport: Cycling
- Current team: Retired
- Discipline: Road
- Role: Rider

Professional teams
- 1997–1999: Festina–Lotus
- 2000–2001: Cofidis
- 2002–2003: Jean Delatour
- 2004–2010: Brioches La Boulangère

Laurent Lefèvre (born 2 July 1976) is a French former professional road bicycle racer, last for UCI Professional Continental team Bbox Bouygues Telecom. He is one of only three Festina team riders who was named as being clean in the Festina doping affair in the 1998 Tour de France. He is the brother of racing cyclist David Lefèvre and the cousin of racing cyclists Olivier Bonnaire and Marion Rousse.

== Major results ==
- Combative rider for Stage 8, 2008 Tour de France
- Critérium du Dauphiné Libéré - 1 stage (2003)
- Bayern-Rundfahrt - 1 stage (2003)
- A Travers le Morbihan (2002)
- GP de Villers Cotterêts (2002)
- Prueba Villafranca de Ordizia (1997)
- Vuelta Ciclista de Chile - 1 stage (1997)
- World U19 Road Race Championship - 2nd (1994)
- World U19 Time Trial Championship - 3rd (1994)
