= David Lefèvre (cyclist) =

French cyclist

Personal information
- Full name: David Lefèvre
- Born: 29 April 1972 (age 54) Maubeuge, France

Cycling career
- Sport: Cycling
- Discipline: Road
- Role: Rider

Professional teams
- 1996-1999: Casino
- 2000-2001: Cofidis
- 2003: Jean Delatour
- 2004: R.A.G.T. Semences-MG Rover

Major wins
- Étoile de Bessèges (1999)

David Lefèvre (born 29 April 1972 in Maubeuge, Nord) is a French former professional road bicycle racer.

Lefèvre is the older brother of professional cyclist Laurent Lefèvre and a cousin of Olivier Bonnaire.

== Palmarès ==
1993
1st, Stage 3, Tour de Liège
1996
1st, Stage 3, Tour of Japan
1999
1st, Overall, Étoile de Bessèges

1st, Stage 3
