= 2011 Tre Valli Varesine =

2010-2011 UCI Europe Tour, race 18 of 27

Race details
- Dates: 16 August 2011
- Stages: 1
- Distance: 199.1 km (123.7 mi)
- Winning time: 4h 41' 30"

Results
	Winner	Davide Rebellin (Italy)	(Miche-Guerciotti)
	Second	Domenico Pozzovivo (Italy)	(Colnago–CSF Inox)
	Third	Thibaut Pinot (France)	(FDJ)

The 2011 Tre Valli Varesine was the 91st edition of the Tre Valli Varesine, a single-day cycling race. It was held on 16 August 2011, over a distance of 199.1 km (123.7 mi). The race started in Besozzo and finished in Campione d'Italia, in Varese, Lombardy. Davide Rebellin won the race (his first win since his 2008 suspension), beating Domenico Pozzovivo by four seconds.

== Teams and riders ==
Five ProTour teams and Eleven Professional Continental teams were invited. Two Italian Continental teams completed the startlist.

The 18 teams invited to the race were:

ProTour Teams

- Liquigas–Cannondale
- Garmin–Cervélo
- Team Katusha
- Lampre–ISD
- Astana

Professional Continental Teams

- Farnese Vini–Neri Sottoli
- Geox–TMC
- Androni Giocattoli
- FDJ
- Topsport Vlaanderen–Mercator
- Landbouwkrediet
- Acqua & Sapone
- Colnago–CSF Inox
- De Rosa–Ceramica Flaminia
- CCC–Polsat–Polkowice
- UnitedHealthcare

Continental Teams

- D'Angelo & Antenucci-Nippo
- Miche-Guerciotti

Teams consisted of up to eight riders, and 178 riders started the event. The event took place two days after the conclusion of the 2011 Eneco Tour.

== Results ==
	Cyclist	Team	Time	UCI Europe Tour Points
1	Davide Rebellin (ITA)	Miche-Guerciotti	4h 41' 30"	100
2	Domenico Pozzovivo (ITA)	Colnago–CSF Inox	+ 4"	70
3	Thibaut Pinot (FRA)	FDJ	+ 7"	40
4	Enrico Gasparotto (ITA)	Astana	s.t.	0*
5	Simon Clarke (AUS)	Astana	s.t.	0*
6	Egor Silin (RUS)	Team Katusha	s.t.	0*
7	Federico Canuti (ITA)	Colnago–CSF Inox	s.t.	15
8	Simone Stortoni (ITA)	Colnago–CSF Inox	s.t.	10
9	Miguel Ángel Rubiano (COL)	D'Angelo & Antenucci-Nippo	s.t.	9
10	Danilo Di Luca (ITA)	Team Katusha	+ 17"	0*

- No points were received by ProTour teams
