= Simone Stortoni =

Italian cyclist (born 1985)

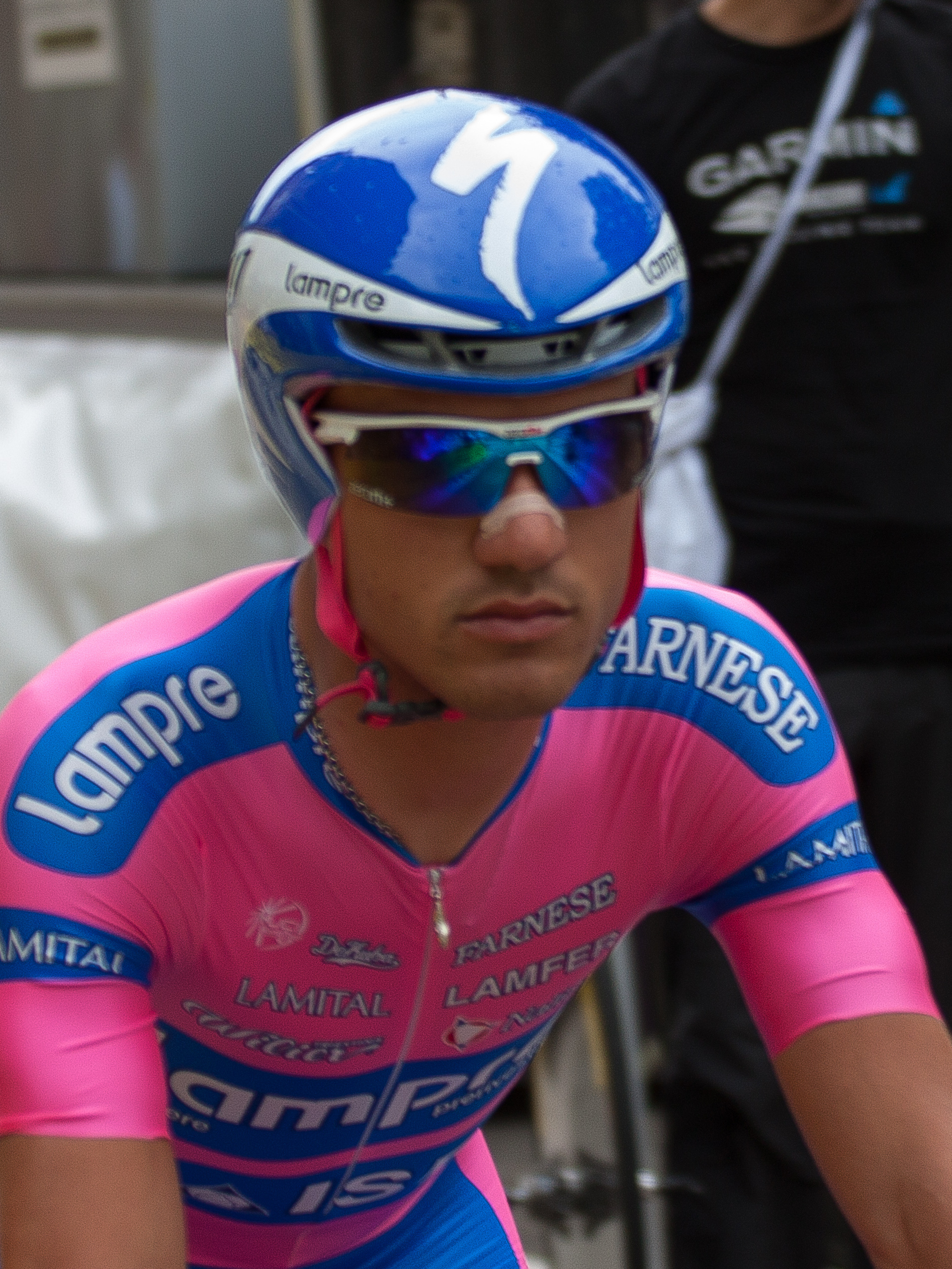
- Stortoni at the 2012 Critérium du Dauphiné

Personal information
- Full name: Simone Stortoni
- Born: 7 July 1985 (age 41) Chiaravalle, Italy
- Height: 1.69 m (5 ft 7 in)
- Weight: 59 kg (130 lb)

Cycling career
- Sport: Cycling
- Discipline: Road
- Role: Rider

Professional teams
- 2009–2011: CSF Group–Navigare
- 2012–2013: Lampre–ISD
- 2014: Amore & Vita–Selle SMP
- 2015: Androni Giocattoli

Simone Stortoni (born 7 July 1985) is an Italian former professional road bicycle racer, who rode professionally between 2009 and 2015 for the Colnago–CSF Inox, Lampre–Merida, Amore & Vita–Selle SMP and Androni Giocattoli–Sidermec teams.

== Career ==
Born in Chiaravalle, Stortoni competed as a professional from the start of the 2009 season, competing for the CSF Group–Navigare team until the end of 2011, when he joined the Lampre–ISD squad for the 2012 season. After his contract with Lampre–Merida was not renewed in 2013, Amore & Vita–Selle SMP announced that they had signed Stortoni in May 2014. Subsequently, he signed a one-year contract with Androni Giocattoli for the 2015 season.

Stortoni competed in six Grand Tour events during his career, contesting the Giro d'Italia four times, the Tour de France in 2012 and the Vuelta a España in 2013. At his first Giro in 2010, Stortoni finished second during stage eight, after being the closest challenger to Chris Anker Sørensen on the climb to Monte Terminillo.

== Major results ==
2005
3rd GP Città di Felino
4th Trofeo Città di Brescia
4th GP Capodarco
2006
1st Cronoscalata Gardone Valtrompia
3rd Parma–La Spezia
3rd Memorial Danilo Furlan
3rd Caduti di Soprazocco
6th Trofeo Alcide Degasperi
8th Giro del Canavese
9th GP Capodarco
9th Coppa Colli Briantei
2007
1st Giro del Belvedere
1st GP Comune di Cerreto Guidi
1st La Bolghera
2nd Firenze–Modena
3rd Overall Giro del Friuli-Venezia Giulia
3rd Coppa 29 Martiri di Figline di Prato
3rd Gran Premio Industria Commercio Artigianato – Casini
3rd G.P. Chianti Castello Guicciardini di Poppiano
5th Trofeo FPT Tapparo
6th Overall Giro della Toscana
2008
1st Gran Premio Industrie del Marmo
1st Memorial Pigoni & Coli
1st Gran Premio Industria Commercio Artigianato – Botticino
1st Trofeo FPT Tapparo
2nd Caduti di Soprazocco
2nd Trofeo Alta Valle Del Tevere
3rd GP Enel Monte Amiata
5th Gran Premio Industria Commercio Artigianato – Casini
5th Gran Premio Città di Empoli
2010
6th Gran Premio di Lugano
9th Coppa Sabatini
2011
2nd Overall Settimana Ciclistica Lombarda
2nd Gran Premio Città di Camaiore
7th Overall Giro di Padania
8th Tre Valli Varesine
2012
6th Giro del Veneto
8th Overall Tour of Norway
2013
7th Grand Prix of Aargau Canton
2015
8th Overall Settimana Internazionale di Coppi e Bartali
9th Overall Tour of Slovenia

=== Grand Tour general classification results timeline ===
| Grand Tour | 2010 | 2011 | 2012 | 2013 | 2014 | 2015 |
|---|---|---|---|---|---|---|
| Giro d'Italia | 73 | 80 | — | 56 | — | 50 |
| Tour de France | — | — | 69 | — | — | — |
| Vuelta a España | — | — | — | DNF | — | — |

Legend
| — | Did not compete |
| DNF | Did not finish |
