= Olivier Bonnaire =

French cyclist

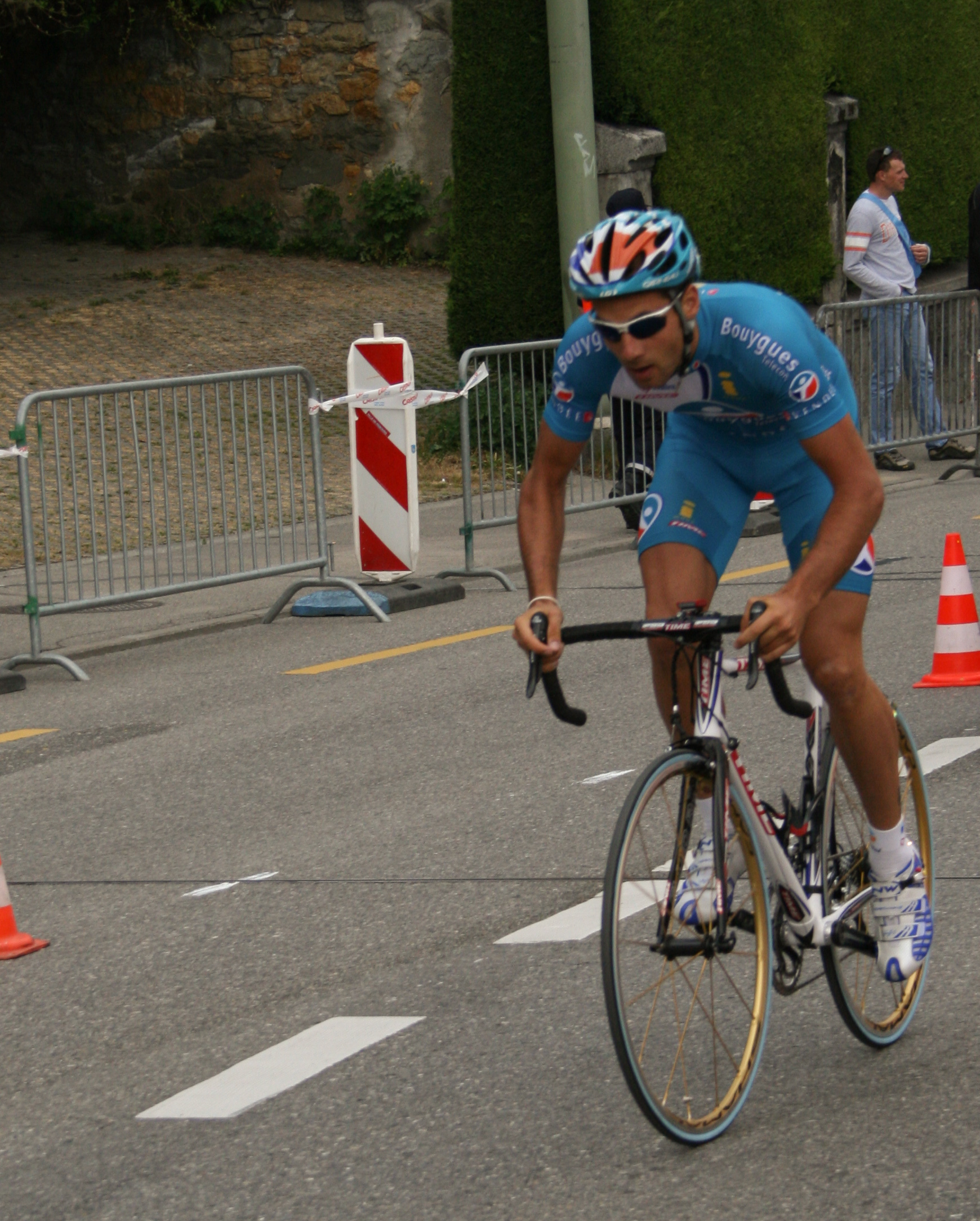
- Bonnaire at the 2007 Tour de Romandie

Personal information
- Full name: Olivier Bonnaire
- Born: 2 March 1983 (age 43) Le Quesnoy, France
- Height: 1.78 m (5 ft 10 in)
- Weight: 67 kg (148 lb)

Cycling career
- Sport: Cycling
- Discipline: Road
- Role: Rider

Professional teams
- 2005–2009: Bouygues Télécom
- 2010–2011: Française des Jeux

Olivier Bonnaire (born 2 March 1983 in Le Quesnoy) is a French former road bicycle racer, who rode professionally from 2005 to 2011 with the Bbox Bouygues Telecom and FDJ teams. He returned to cycling as an amateur in 2013 when he rode for the Entente Cycliste Vieux Condé-Péruwelz-Bury team. He is a cousin of racing cyclists David Lefèvre, Laurent Lefèvre and Marion Rousse.

== Major results ==
- 2007 Giro d'Italia – 45th
- 2006 Giro d'Italia – 115th
- 2005 Giro d'Italia – 82nd
- Volta del Llangosti (2003)
