= List of teams and cyclists in the 2008 Vuelta a España =

The list of teams and cyclists in the 2008 Vuelta a España contains the professional road bicycle racers who compete at the 2008 Vuelta a España from August 30 to September 21, 2008.

CSC–Saxo Bank (Denmark) CSC
No.	Rider	Pos.
1	(Spain) Carlos Sastre	3
2	(Russia) Alexandr Kolobnev	40
3	(Spain) Íñigo Cuesta	37
4	(Belgium) Jurgen Van Goolen	16
5	(Argentina) Juan José Haedo	DNF-15
6	(Netherlands) Karsten Kroon	72
7	(Denmark) Matti Breschel	48
8	(Denmark) Michael Blaudzun	82
9	(Ukraine) Volodymyr Gustov	44

Ag2r–La Mondiale (France) ALM
No.	Rider	Pos.
11	(Italy) Rinaldo Nocentini	23
12	(Spain) José Luis Arrieta	55
13	(France) Renaud Dion	113
14	(France) Hubert Dupont	32
15	(France) John Gadret	18
16	(France) Julien Loubet	70
17	(France) Lloyd Mondory	120
18	(France) Stéphane Poulhies	128
19	(Belarus) Alexandre Usov	123

Andalucía–CajaSur (Spain) ACA
No.	Rider	Pos.
21	(Spain) José Luis Carrasco	68
22	(Spain) José Antonio Carrasco	65
23	(Spain) José Antonio López	DSQ-13
24	(Spain) Francisco José Martínez	122
25	(Spain) Javier Moreno	21
26	(Spain) Manuel Ortega	83
27	(Spain) Juan Javier Estrada	114
28	(Spain) Jesús Rosendo	116
29	(Spain) José Ruiz Sánchez	53

Astana (Luxembourg) AST
No.	Rider	Pos.
31	(Spain) Alberto Contador	1
32	(Germany) Andreas Klöden	20
33	(United States) Levi Leipheimer	2
34	(Kazakhstan) Dmitriy Muravyev	131
35	(Kazakhstan) Assan Bazayev	130
36	(Spain) Benjamín Noval	62
37	(Portugal) Sérgio Paulinho	26
38	(Spain) José Luis Rubiera	22
39	(Lithuania) Tomas Vaitkus	95

Bouygues Télécom (France) BTL
No.	Rider	Pos.
41	(France) Dimitri Champion	106
42	(Netherlands) Stef Clement	DNF-7
43	(Switzerland) Aurélien Clerc	DNS-5
44	(Spain) Xavier Florencio	36
45	(France) Anthony Geslin	DNF-10
46	(France) Vincent Jerome	76
47	(France) Arnaud Labbe	108
48	(France) Alexandre Pichot	DNF-10
49	(France) Olivier Bonnaire	61

Caisse d'Epargne (Spain) GCE
No.	Rider	Pos.
51	(Spain) Alejandro Valverde	5
52	(Spain) David Arroyo	17
53	(Spain) José Vicente García	119
54	(Spain) Imanol Erviti	99
55	(Spain) Daniel Moreno	12
56	(Spain) Alberto Losada	24
57	(Spain) Luis Pasamontes	35
58	(Spain) Joaquim Rodríguez	6
59	(Spain) Xabier Zandio	50

Cofidis (France) COF
No.	Rider	Pos.
61	(France) Sylvain Chavanel	DNS-17
62	(Belgium) Kevin De Weert	59
63	(Colombia) Leonardo Duque	67
64	(Spain) Bingen Fernandez Bustinza	87
65	(France) Maryan Hary	DNS-5
66	(France) David Moncoutié	8
67	(France) Sébastien Minard	71
68	(Belgium) Nick Nuyens	78
69	(Belgium) Staf Scheirlinckx	DNS-1

Crédit Agricole (France) C.A
No.	Rider	Pos.
71	(France) Patrice Halgand	DNS-15
72	(France) Sébastien Hinault	64
73	(United Kingdom) Jeremy Hunt	107
74	(France) Christophe Kern	112
75	(France) Cyril Lemoine	100
76	(France) Jean Marc Marino	DNF-8
77	(Norway) Gabriel Rasch	86
78	(Republic of Ireland) Nicolas Roche	13
79	(France) Yannick Talabardon	31

Euskaltel–Euskadi (Spain) EUS
No.	Rider	Pos.
81	(Spain) Igor Antón	DNF-13
82	(Spain) Mikel Astarloza	28
83	(Spain) Koldo Fernández	94
84	(Spain) Iñigo Landaluze	63
85	(Spain) Egoi Martínez	9
86	(Spain) Alan Pérez	69
87	(Spain) Rubén Pérez	41
88	(Spain) Amets Txurruka	45
89	(Spain) Iván Velasco	51

Française des Jeux (France) FDJ
No.	Rider	Pos.
91	(France) Sandy Casar	19
92	(France) Mickaël Delage	103
93	(France) Rémy Di Gregorio	80
94	(Belgium) Philippe Gilbert	DNS-18
95	(France) Sébastien Joly	DNF-17
96	(France) Mathieu Ladagnous	89
97	(Belgium) Gianni Meersman	DNS-12
98	(Belgium) Jelle Vanendert	101
99	(France) Francis Mourey	96

Team Gerolsteiner (Germany) GST
No.	Rider	Pos.
101	(Italy) Davide Rebellin	DNS-14
102	(Switzerland) Mathias Frank	DNF-13
103	(Italy) Oscar Gatto	127
104	(Germany) Sebastian Lang	79
105	(Netherlands) Tom Stamsnijder	88
106	(Germany) Stephan Schreck	DNS-12
107	(Germany) Stefan Schumacher	DNS-19
108	(Germany) Heinrich Haussler	DNF-19
109	(Switzerland) Oliver Zaugg	11

Xacobeo–Galicia (Spain) XAG
No.	Rider	Pos.
111	(Spain) Ezequiel Mosquera	4
112	(Spain) Carlos Castaño	38
113	(Spain) Gustavo César	29
114	(Spain) Gustavo Dominguez	84
115	(Spain) David García	14
116	(Spain) David Herrero	47
117	(Spain) Serafín Martínez	90
118	(Spain) Iban Mayoz	39
119	(Russia) Eduard Vorganov	60

Lampre (Italy) LAM
No.	Rider	Pos.
121	(Italy) Damiano Cunego	DNS-16
122	(Italy) Alessandro Ballan	DNS-15
123	(Italy) Emanuele Bindi	129
124	(Italy) Marzio Bruseghin	10
125	(Italy) Marco Marzano	25
126	(Italy) Massimiliano Mori	124
127	(Italy) Danilo Napolitano	DNS-12
128	(Italy) Mauro Santambrogio	121
129	(Italy) Paolo Tiralongo	27

Liquigas (Italy) LIQ
No.	Rider	Pos.
131	(Italy) Daniele Bennati	DNS-10
132	(Italy) Valerio Agnoli	110
133	(Italy) Claudio Corioni	97
134	(Italy) Enrico Franzoi	98
135	(Italy) Filippo Pozzato	DNS-19
136	(Italy) Manuel Quinziato	DNF-18
137	(Italy) Ivan Santaromita	125
138	(Slovenia) Gorazd Štangelj	109
139	(Italy) Alessandro Vanotti	75

Quick-Step (Belgium) QST
No.	Rider	Pos.
141	(Italy) Paolo Bettini	DNS-19
142	(Spain) Carlos Barredo	DNS-7
143	(Belgium) Tom Boonen	DNS-18
144	(Spain) Juan Manuel Gárate	15
145	(Belgium) Wouter Weylandt	118
146	(Italy) Davide Viganò	93
147	(Italy) Andrea Tonti	DNF-18
148	(Italy) Matteo Tosatto	DNF-18
149	(Belgium) Kevin van Impe	126

Rabobank (Netherlands) RAB
No.	Rider	Pos.
151	(Spain) Óscar Freire	DNS-13
152	(Colombia) Mauricio Ardila	DNF-15
153	(Spain) Juan Antonio Flecha	74
154	(Russia) Dmitri Kozontchuk	54
155	(Netherlands) Robert Gesink	7
156	(Spain) Pedro Horrillo	117
157	(Netherlands) Marc de Maar	56
158	(Germany) Grischa Niermann	30
159	(Netherlands) Theo Eltink	77

Silence–Lotto (Belgium) SIL
No.	Rider	Pos.
161	(Ukraine) Yaroslav Popovych	52
162	(Belgium) Dominique Cornu	46
163	(Belgium) Bart Dockx	111
164	(Belgium) Pieter Jacobs	91
165	(Belgium) Olivier Kaisen	92
166	(Australia) Matthew Lloyd	DNS-9
167	(Belgium) Roy Sentjens	33
168	(Netherlands) Maarten Tjallingii	58
169	(Belgium) Greg Van Avermaet	66

Team Milram (Germany) MRM
No.	Rider	Pos.
171	(Germany) Erik Zabel	49
172	(Ukraine) Volodymyr Dyudya	DNF-7
173	(Germany) Artur Gajek	DSQ-15
174	(Ukraine) Andriy Hryvko	42
175	(Slovakia) Matej Jurčo	81
176	(Germany) Christian Kux	DNF-19
177	(Italy) Fabio Sabatini	102
178	(Germany) Sebastian Schwager	115
179	(Slovakia) Martin Velits	73

Tinkoff Credit Systems (Italy) TCS
No.	Rider	Pos.
181	(Russia) Mikhail Ignatiev	104
182	(Russia) Ivan Rovny	DNF-16
183	(Russia) Nikita Eskov	57
184	(Russia) Evgeni Petrov	43
185	(Belarus) Vasil Kiryienka	34
186	(Russia) Pavel Brutt	105
187	(Colombia) Walter Pedraza	85
188	(Spain) Ricardo Serrano	DNS-4
189	(Russia) Nikolay Trusov	DNS-7

== See also ==
- 2008 Vuelta a España
- 2008 Vuelta a España, Stage 1 to Stage 11
- 2008 Vuelta a España, Stage 12 to Stage 21
