= 2008 Vuelta a España, Stage 12 to Stage 21 =

Cycling race stages

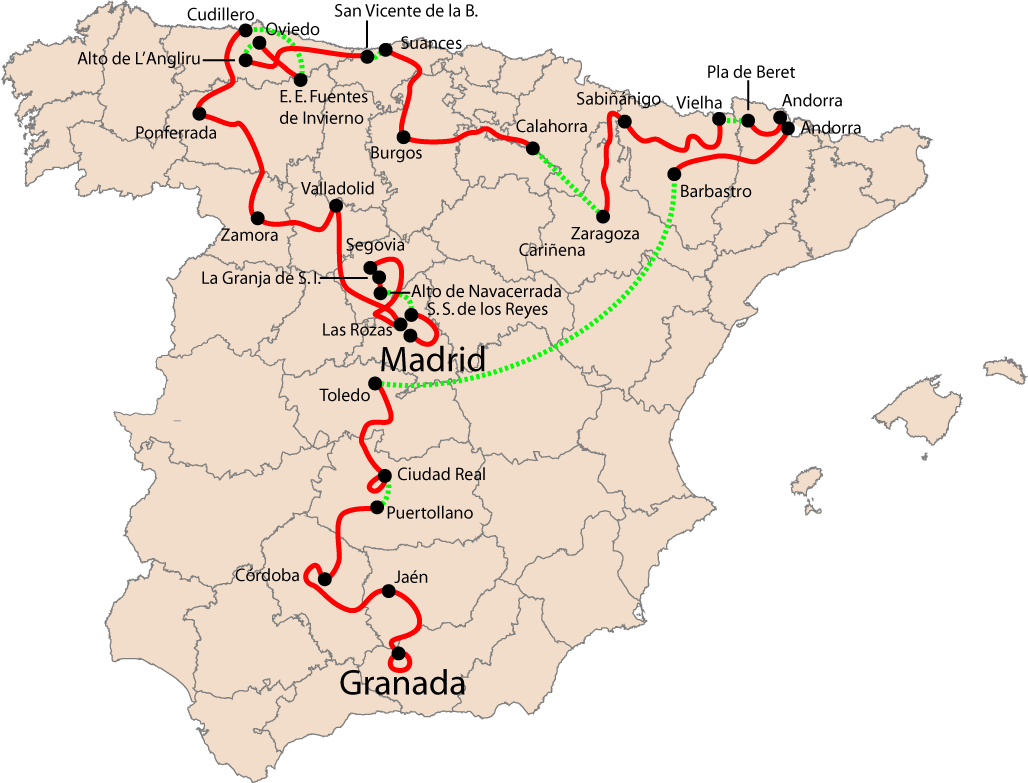
Overview of the stages

These are the individual stages of the 2008 Vuelta a España, with Stage 12 on 11 September and Stage 21 on September 21.

== Stages ==
=== Stage 12 ===
11 September 2008 – Burgos to Suances, 186 km

Going into the second rest day, the field faced a hilly stage, with two second and one third-category climb along the course and lots of descending. The final 40 kilometers, after the second-category Alto del Carracol, undulated very gently, so any type of finish was seen as possible.

The escaping breakaway formed after 10 kilometers, involving Sébastien Hinault, Sandy Casar, and Manuel Quinziato. As the breakaway formed, Tinkoff tried to place a rider in it, but was unsuccessful. The main field was paced alternately by Caisse d'Epargne, Quick Step, and Lampre, and their pace combined with the cold and rainy weather of the day proved a tough test for many riders, dropping back from the field. An unexpected rider to crack, toward the end of the stage, was Alejandro Valverde, who finished more than 3 minutes behind the stage winner and fell out of the top ten in the GC. The rest of his Caisse d'Epargne team went back with him to try to pace him back into the front group, but they were not successful. Ezequiel Mosquera also fell out of the front group briefly, but his Xacobeo–Galicia teammates were able to get him back in there.

The pace that Quick Step and Lampre set kept it so that the breakaway never attained more than 4 minutes of advantage. They were caught well before the line, with some 30 kilometers to race. A 28-man group was together with a sizeable advantage over the rest of the field in the stage's final minutes. The group had several members of the top teams in the GC, Astana and Euskaltel–Euskadi, who took the pace. Alberto Contador was the first of this group to attack for the stage win, but the victory went to Paolo Bettini, who had ironically given interviews earlier in the day describing his dissatisfaction over his team Quick Step signing Stefan Schumacher from the dissolving Gerolsteiner and vowed to ride for someone else in 2009. Contador took back three seconds on Egoi Martínez in the final sprint to the line.

Stage 12 results

	Rider	Team	Time
1	Paolo Bettini (ITA)	Quick-Step	4h 42' 44"
2	Davide Rebellin (ITA)	Gerolsteiner	+ 1"
3	Damiano Cunego (ITA)	Lampre	+ 1"
4	Alessandro Ballan (ITA)	Lampre	+ 1"
5	Alberto Contador (ESP)	Astana	+ 1"
6	Egoi Martínez (ESP)	Euskaltel–Euskadi	+ 4"
7	Oliver Zaugg (SUI)	Gerolsteiner	+ 4"
8	Carlos Sastre (ESP)	CSC–Saxo Bank	+ 4"
9	Levi Leipheimer (USA)	Astana	+ 4"
10	Igor Antón (ESP)	Euskaltel–Euskadi	+ 4"

General classification after stage 12

	Rider	Team	Time
1	Egoi Martínez (ESP)	Euskaltel–Euskadi	45h 48' 33"
2	Levi Leipheimer (USA)	Astana	+ 11"
3	Alberto Contador (ESP)	Astana	+ 29"
4	Carlos Sastre (ESP)	CSC–Saxo Bank	+ 1' 38"
5	Ezequiel Mosquera (ESP)	Xacobeo–Galicia	+ 2' 10"
6	Igor Antón (ESP)	Euskaltel–Euskadi	+ 2' 23"
7	Robert Gesink (NED)	Rabobank	+ 3' 22"
8	Davide Rebellin (ITA)	Gerolsteiner	+ 3' 40"
9	Marzio Bruseghin (ITA)	Lampre	+ 4' 09"
10	Joaquim Rodríguez (ESP)	Caisse d'Epargne	+ 4' 10"

=== Rest day ===
12 September 2008

=== Stage 13 ===
13 September 2008 – San Vicente de la Barquera to Alto de L'Angliru, 209 km

There were five categorized climbs on this course, including three first-category hills, but the main attraction was the special-category Alto de El Angliru at the finish, which made its fourth appearance in the Vuelta and first since 2002. This brutal climb featured gradients as high as 23% near the summit.

The Euskaltel team kept several attempted breakaways in the first hour from going clear. This was not to protect the overall lead of Egoi Martínez, which was all but assured to be lost on such a stage (as Martínez was not seen as a strong enough climber in comparison with others high in the GC), but to protect the chances of victory in the Vuelta's queen stage for Igor Antón. Ironically, Antón would fail to even finish the stage, abandoning after sustaining a broken collarbone in a crash climbing Angliru.

The rider that succeeded at coming clear was Christophe Kern, allowed to leave after 37 kilometers and an hour in the saddle. Shortly afterward, a two-man chase was formed, comprising Maarten Tjallingii and Matej Jurčo. With so much more looming at the finish, the main field was more than content to let these three top the third-category Alto de Ortigueiro well ahead of them. After the descent, Kern pulled up and literally waited at the side of the road for about two minutes for the other two to join him, so they could all work together.

The Astana Team came forward to take the pace at the bottom of the first first-category climb of the day, the Puerto de Arnicio. The breakaway's lead at this point was 11 minutes, but it slowly and steadily fell until a 20-man group who were able to take Astana's pace caught them just after the summit of the third first-category hill, the Alto del Cordal. Domestiques from Astana and Caisse d'Epargne traded shots setting the pace up the Alto de El Angliru, going up to the finish line. As the climb neared its hardest part, 7 kilometers from the end, it was Levi Leipheimer who came forward to sacrifice himself for Alberto Contador, setting a pace that cracked everyone in the group (and caused Leipheimer himself to bonk), but left Contador free to attack for the stage win. The golden jersey came with it.

Stage 13 results

	Rider	Team	Time
1	Alberto Contador (ESP)	Astana	5h 52' 35"
2	Alejandro Valverde (ESP)	Caisse d'Epargne	+ 42"
3	Joaquim Rodríguez (ESP)	Caisse d'Epargne	+ 58"
4	Levi Leipheimer (USA)	Astana	+ 1' 05"
5	Carlos Sastre (ESP)	CSC–Saxo Bank	+ 1' 32"
6	Robert Gesink (NED)	Rabobank	+ 1' 56"
7	Ezequiel Mosquera (ESP)	Xacobeo–Galicia	+ 2' 18"
8	Oliver Zaugg (SUI)	Gerolsteiner	+ 2' 28"
9	Damiano Cunego (ITA)	Lampre	+ 2' 43"
10	Daniel Moreno (ESP)	Caisse d'Epargne	+ 3' 01"

General classification after stage 13

	Rider	Team	Time
1	Alberto Contador (ESP)	Astana	51h 41' 17"
2	Levi Leipheimer (USA)	Astana	+ 1' 07"
3	Carlos Sastre (ESP)	CSC–Saxo Bank	+ 3' 01"
4	Ezequiel Mosquera (ESP)	Xacobeo–Galicia	+ 4' 19"
5	Alejandro Valverde (ESP)	Caisse d'Epargne	+ 4' 40"
6	Joaquim Rodríguez (ESP)	Caisse d'Epargne	+ 4' 51"
7	Robert Gesink (NED)	Rabobank	+ 5' 09"
8	Egoi Martínez (ESP)	Euskaltel–Euskadi	+ 6' 56"
9	Davide Rebellin (ITA)	Gerolsteiner	+ 7' 39"
10	Oliver Zaugg (SUI)	Gerolsteiner	+ 8' 41"

=== Stage 14 ===
14 September 2008 – Oviedo to Fuentes de Invierno, 158 km

This stage went from hilly to mountainous. There were six categorized climbs on this course, three first-category and three third-category. The three third-category hills were all in the first 35 kilometers, leaving the riders to tackle three first-category climbs over the remainder of the stage, ending nearly as high in elevation as they did the previous day at Angliru when they headed up to the ski resort Fuentes de Invierno.

An eight-man group broke free of the main field after 25 kilometers, just before the third-category climb of San Tirso. A three-man chase joined them on the descent, and the eleven were away as a sustained group for much of the stage. Their maximum advantage grew to five minutes before the main field, paced mostly by Caisse d'Epargne rather than the race leader's Astana Team, started to reel them in. Their sporting director Eusebio Unzué explained that the breakaway had unexpectedly contained some high-profile riders and they needed to keep the time gap as low as possible to try to work for a stage win for Alejandro Valverde at Fuentes de Invierno.

Ezequiel Mosquera made attack after attack on the way up to the summit, and only Valverde and the Astana duo of race leader Alberto Contador and teammate Levi Leipheimer were able to answer. Eventually, Valverde also fell, and the stage was contested among the other three. Contador attacked within a kilometer of the finish and Mosquera couldn't answer, giving Contador a second straight stage win. This time, he had three leader's jerseys awaiting him on the podium – the golden, the white, and the points classification blue jersey.

It was later revealed that Contador and Valverde had struck a deal that they would stick together on the stage and Valverde would take the stage win while Contador retained the overall lead in the Vuelta. However, when Mosquera's attacks cracked Valverde, Contador took the opportunity for the stage win.

Stage 14 results

	Rider	Team	Time
1	Alberto Contador (ESP)	Astana	4h 16' 01"
2	Levi Leipheimer (USA)	Astana	+ 2"
3	Ezequiel Mosquera (ESP)	Xacobeo–Galicia	+ 4"
4	Robert Gesink (NED)	Rabobank	+ 20"
5	David Moncoutié (FRA)	Cofidis	+ 20"
6	Carlos Sastre (ESP)	CSC–Saxo Bank	+ 20"
7	Marzio Bruseghin (ITA)	Lampre	+ 1' 00"
8	Oliver Zaugg (SUI)	Gerolsteiner	+ 1' 00"
9	Joaquim Rodríguez (ESP)	Caisse d'Epargne	+ 1' 00"
10	John Gadret (FRA)	Ag2r–La Mondiale	+ 1' 00"

General classification after stage 14

	Rider	Team	Time
1	Alberto Contador (ESP)	Astana	55h 56' 58"
2	Levi Leipheimer (USA)	Astana	+ 1' 17"
3	Carlos Sastre (ESP)	CSC–Saxo Bank	+ 3' 41"
4	Ezequiel Mosquera (ESP)	Xacobeo–Galicia	+ 4' 35"
5	Robert Gesink (NED)	Rabobank	+ 5' 49"
6	Alejandro Valverde (ESP)	Caisse d'Epargne	+ 6' 00"
7	Joaquim Rodríguez (ESP)	Caisse d'Epargne	+ 6' 11"
8	Egoi Martínez (ESP)	Euskaltel–Euskadi	+ 8' 56"
9	David Moncoutié (FRA)	Cofidis	+ 9' 32"
10	Oliver Zaugg (SUI)	Gerolsteiner	+ 10' 01"

=== Stage 15 ===
15 September 2008 – Cudillero to Ponferrada, 202 km

This stage had a first, a second, and a third-category climb on it, in succession. There was as well an uncategorized hill about 10 kilometers before the finish that was thought to keep any sprinters that survived that far honest.

The day's breakaway formed after a little over 50 kilometers, as several escape attempts consolidated into one 17-man breakaway. Their lead grew to a maximum of nearly 17 minutes, as the Astana-paced main field was more than content to let them go, seeing no threats in the group. José Luis Arrieta, Juan Manuel Gárate, and David Arroyo traded attacks on the way into Ponferrada, that cracked some of their breakaway mates who finished as much as seven minutes behind them, but it was Xacobeo–Galicia rider David García who won the stage, launching the decisive attack 3 kilometers from the line. The main field finished 14'23" behind the stage winner, but there were no changes to the top ten in the GC.

Stage 15 results

	Rider	Team	Time
1	David García (ESP)	Xacobeo–Galicia	5h 02' 27"
2	Nick Nuyens (BEL)	Cofidis	+ 17"
3	Juan Manuel Gárate (ESP)	Quick-Step	+ 17"
4	Paolo Tiralongo (ITA)	Lampre	+ 33"
5	Mikel Astarloza (ESP)	Euskaltel–Euskadi	+ 36"
6	David Arroyo (ESP)	Caisse d'Epargne	+ 39"
7	Matti Breschel (DEN)	CSC–Saxo Bank	+ 1' 38"
8	Xabier Zandio (ESP)	Caisse d'Epargne	+ 1' 38"
9	Philippe Gilbert (BEL)	Française des Jeux	+ 1' 39"
10	Sébastien Minard (FRA)	Cofidis	+ 2' 38"

General classification after stage 15

	Rider	Team	Time
1	Alberto Contador (ESP)	Astana	61h 13' 48"
2	Levi Leipheimer (USA)	Astana	+ 1' 17"
3	Carlos Sastre (ESP)	CSC–Saxo Bank	+ 3' 41"
4	Ezequiel Mosquera (ESP)	Xacobeo–Galicia	+ 4' 35"
5	Robert Gesink (NED)	Rabobank	+ 5' 49"
6	Alejandro Valverde (ESP)	Caisse d'Epargne	+ 6' 00"
7	Joaquim Rodríguez (ESP)	Caisse d'Epargne	+ 6' 11"
8	Egoi Martínez (ESP)	Euskaltel–Euskadi	+ 8' 56"
9	David Moncoutié (FRA)	Cofidis	+ 9' 32"
10	Oliver Zaugg (SUI)	Gerolsteiner	+ 10' 01"

=== Stage 16 ===
16 September 2008 – Ponferrada to Zamora, 186 km

After the first-category Alto del Acebo at the 15 kilometer mark, the riders escaped the mountains for the time being – there were no further categorized climbs in this stage or the next one. After the descent, the course didn't so much as undulate, so a bunched sprint finish was expected.

The field took it very easy for the first hour. There were no breakaway attempts, and that first hour in the saddle covered just the 15 kilometers to the Alto de Acebo. On the descent, the attacks began. Jesús Rosendo, who had earlier in the Vuelta been the first leader of the King of the Mountains, and Walter Fernando Pedraza were the ones that got away, and attained a maximum advantage of 8 minutes on the main field. The field was pulled along not by the race leader's team Astana, but by Quick Step, and in particular Paolo Bettini, working to get Tom Boonen a second stage victory in this Vuelta. The teams of other prominent sprinters came forward to take the pace over from Bettini when he later needed medical attention. The catch occurred 7 kilometers from the line, and Boonen indeed won his second bunched sprint, after an early leadout headed by Bettini.

Stage 16 results

	Rider	Team	Time
1	Tom Boonen (BEL)	Quick-Step	5h 21' 16"
2	Filippo Pozzato (ITA)	Liquigas	s.t.
3	Heinrich Haussler (GER)	Gerolsteiner	s.t.
4	Mickaël Delage (FRA)	Française des Jeux	s.t.
5	Thomas Vaitkus (LTU)	Astana	s.t.
6	Koldo Fernández (ESP)	Euskaltel–Euskadi	s.t.
7	Alexandre Usov (BLR)	Ag2r–La Mondiale	s.t.
8	Mauro Santambrogio (ITA)	Lampre	s.t.
9	Oscar Gatto (ITA)	Gerolsteiner	s.t.
10	Sébastien Hinault (FRA)	Crédit Agricole	s.t.

General classification after stage 16

	Rider	Team	Time
1	Alberto Contador (ESP)	Astana	66h 35' 04"
2	Levi Leipheimer (USA)	Astana	+ 1' 17"
3	Carlos Sastre (ESP)	CSC–Saxo Bank	+ 3' 41"
4	Ezequiel Mosquera (ESP)	Xacobeo–Galicia	+ 4' 35"
5	Robert Gesink (NED)	Rabobank	+ 5' 49"
6	Alejandro Valverde (ESP)	Caisse d'Epargne	+ 6' 00"
7	Joaquim Rodríguez (ESP)	Caisse d'Epargne	+ 6' 11"
8	Egoi Martínez (ESP)	Euskaltel–Euskadi	+ 8' 56"
9	David Moncoutié (FRA)	Cofidis	+ 9' 32"
10	Oliver Zaugg (SUI)	Gerolsteiner	+ 10' 01"

=== Stage 17 ===
17 September 2008 – Zamora to Valladolid, 148 km

An almost totally flat stage 17 was the reward for the sprinters who made it this far. There were no categorized climbs at all on this course. While there were not any hills, it was thought that crosswinds would present a bother to the sprinters in the field.

Pedro Horrillo and José Ruiz broke free of the main field after 13 kilometers. The main field kept them well within reach, and kept several other escape attempts from going clear. Horrillo and Ruiz attained a maximum advantage of over 8 minutes, but the bunch, behind the pace of Silence–Lotto and Euskaltel–Euskadi, caught them 7 kilometers from the line. Imanol Erviti tried to attack 3 kilometers from the finish, but the field caught him. The vast majority of the field finished together, and there was no significant change in the GC for the fourth day in a row.

Stage 17 results

	Rider	Team	Time
1	Wouter Weylandt (BEL)	Quick-Step	3h 18' 48"
2	Matti Breschel (DEN)	CSC–Saxo Bank	s.t.
3	Alexandre Usov (BLR)	Ag2r–La Mondiale	s.t.
4	Koldo Fernández (ESP)	Euskaltel–Euskadi	s.t.
5	Heinrich Haussler (GER)	Gerolsteiner	s.t.
6	Greg Van Avermaet (BEL)	Silence–Lotto	s.t.
7	Oscar Gatto (ITA)	Gerolsteiner	s.t.
8	Sébastien Hinault (FRA)	Crédit Agricole	s.t.
9	Mauro Santambrogio (ITA)	Lampre	s.t.
10	Claudio Corioni (ITA)	Liquigas	s.t.

General classification after stage 17

	Rider	Team	Time
1	Alberto Contador (ESP)	Astana	69h 53' 32"
2	Levi Leipheimer (USA)	Astana	+ 1' 17"
3	Carlos Sastre (ESP)	CSC–Saxo Bank	+ 3' 41"
4	Ezequiel Mosquera (ESP)	Xacobeo–Galicia	+ 4' 35"
5	Robert Gesink (NED)	Rabobank	+ 5' 49"
6	Alejandro Valverde (ESP)	Caisse d'Epargne	+ 6' 00"
7	Joaquim Rodríguez (ESP)	Caisse d'Epargne	+ 6' 11"
8	Egoi Martínez (ESP)	Euskaltel–Euskadi	+ 8' 56"
9	David Moncoutié (FRA)	Cofidis	+ 9' 32"
10	Oliver Zaugg (SUI)	Gerolsteiner	+ 10' 01"

=== Stage 18 ===
18 September 2008– Valladolid to Las Rozas, 167 km

Branded as flat, this stage gradually increased in elevation to its one categorized climb, the third-category Alto de los Leones at the 39 kilometers to go mark, and then gradually decreased to the finishing town of Las Rozas. Another mass sprint finish was expected, but it did not occur.

After a blisteringly fast first hour that covered nearly 50 kilometers and kept several breakaway attempts from going free, an 18-man break formed at the 56 kilometer mark. The best-placed rider in the break was Nicolas Roche, 17th overall and 19'31" behind race leader Alberto Contador. The second hour in the saddle saw the pace ease up, as Contador's Astana Team was content to let the breakaway go, since they did not figure to gain nineteen and a half minutes in such a course. The advantage grew to a maximum of 8'15" before the riders in the breakaway began attacking each other and fragmenting. The field didn't take much advantage, as they finished 7'29" behind the stage winner. Roche appeared to launch the decisive attack into Las Rozas and to be in line for the stage win, but it was Imanol Erviti, who had attacked too early and paid the price the previous day, who timed the finishing kick just right and overtook Roche in the final meters to win the stage. There was again no significant change in the GC after this stage.

Stage 18 results

	Rider	Team	Time
1	Imanol Erviti (ESP)	Caisse d'Epargne	3h 53' 17"
2	Nicolas Roche (IRL)	Crédit Agricole	s.t.
3	David Herrero (ESP)	Xacobeo–Galicia	+ 1"
4	Vasil Kiryienka (BLR)	Tinkoff Credit Systems	+ 5"
5	Karsten Kroon (NED)	CSC–Saxo Bank	+ 10"
6	Greg Van Avermaet (BEL)	Silence–Lotto	+ 13"
7	Enrico Franzoi (ITA)	Liquigas	+ 13"
8	Paolo Bettini (ITA)	Quick-Step	+ 13"
9	Andriy Hryvko (UKR)	Team Milram	+ 13"
10	José Ruiz (ESP)	Andalucía–CajaSur	+ 20"

General classification after stage 18

	Rider	Team	Time
1	Alberto Contador (ESP)	Astana	73h 54' 38"
2	Levi Leipheimer (USA)	Astana	+ 1' 17"
3	Carlos Sastre (ESP)	CSC–Saxo Bank	+ 3' 41"
4	Ezequiel Mosquera (ESP)	Xacobeo–Galicia	+ 4' 35"
5	Robert Gesink (NED)	Rabobank	+ 5' 49"
6	Alejandro Valverde (ESP)	Caisse d'Epargne	+ 6' 00"
7	Joaquim Rodríguez (ESP)	Caisse d'Epargne	+ 6' 11"
8	Egoi Martínez (ESP)	Euskaltel–Euskadi	+ 8' 56"
9	David Moncoutié (FRA)	Cofidis	+ 9' 32"
10	Oliver Zaugg (SUI)	Gerolsteiner	+ 10' 01"

=== Stage 19 ===
19 September 2008– Las Rozas to Segovia, 145 km

This stage offered one last taste of the mountains for the 2008 Vuelta before the time trial and the traditional finish in Madrid. There was a short circuit, of which the riders took 2 laps, in the finishing town of Segovia, thought to leave the type of finish up in the air.

The day's breakaway formed slowly, over the course of almost ten kilometers after nearly an hour and a half in the saddle. It numbered fourteen riders, including four from Caisse d'Epargne, which boded well for Alejandro Valverde. The elite group of favorites, another thirteen strong, never let them get more than two minutes' advantage, and caught them with a third of the stage left to race. Numerous riders launched further attacks on the way into Segovia, with none coming more than ten seconds clear. Perhaps the most aggressive among them was Vasil Kiryienka, who was narrowly defeated in his spring to the line by David Arroyo. The group of GC favorites finished 11 seconds behind the stage winner, and only the bonus seconds won by Joaquim Rodríguez in intermediate sprints caused the GC to change in any way.

Stage 19 results

	Rider	Team	Time
1	David Arroyo (ESP)	Caisse d'Epargne	3h 27' 03"
2	Vasil Kiryienka (BLR)	Tinkoff Credit Systems	+ 3"
3	Nick Nuyens (BEL)	Cofidis	+ 11"
4	Alejandro Valverde (ESP)	Caisse d'Epargne	+ 11"
5	Greg Van Avermaet (BEL)	Silence–Lotto	+ 11"
6	Marzio Bruseghin (ITA)	Lampre	+ 11"
7	Robert Gesink (NED)	Rabobank	+ 11"
8	Rubén Pérez (ESP)	Euskaltel–Euskadi	+ 11"
9	Alberto Contador (ESP)	Astana	+ 11"
10	David Moncoutié (FRA)	Cofidis	+ 11"

General classification after stage 19

	Rider	Team	Time
1	Alberto Contador (ESP)	Astana	77h 21' 52"
2	Levi Leipheimer (USA)	Astana	+ 1' 17"
3	Carlos Sastre (ESP)	CSC–Saxo Bank	+ 3' 41"
4	Ezequiel Mosquera (ESP)	Xacobeo–Galicia	+ 4' 35"
5	Robert Gesink (NED)	Rabobank	+ 5' 49"
6	Alejandro Valverde (ESP)	Caisse d'Epargne	+ 6' 00"
7	Joaquim Rodríguez (ESP)	Caisse d'Epargne	+ 6' 05"
8	Egoi Martínez (ESP)	Euskaltel–Euskadi	+ 8' 56"
9	David Moncoutié (FRA)	Cofidis	+ 9' 32"
10	Oliver Zaugg (SUI)	Gerolsteiner	+ 10' 01"

=== Stage 20 ===
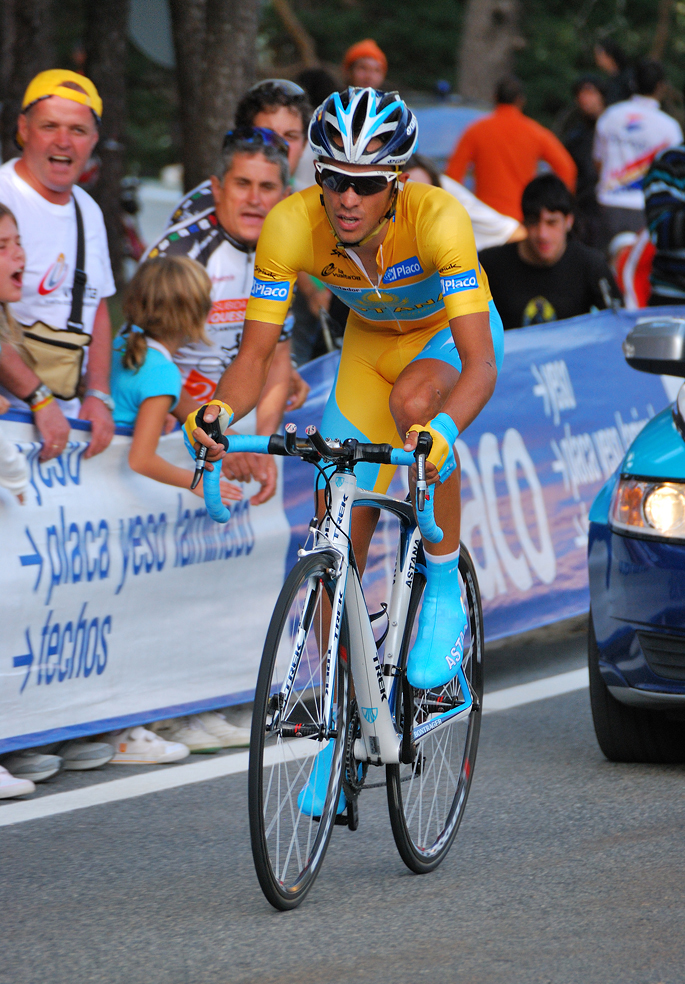
Race leader Contador climbing the Alto de Navacerrada at the end of the time trial.

20 September 2008 – La Granja de San Ildefonso to Alto de Navacerrada, 17 km (ITT)

This time trial was short, but was thought to still live up to the billing the race against the clock gets as the "race of truth" – it ended at the first-category Alto de Navacerrada. The last 7 kilometers of the course were all uphill.

The early time to beat was set by Rubén Pérez, but, true to form, the GC contenders all solidly defeated Pérez's time. Carlos Sastre rode with consistent force, to hold off the charge of Ezequiel Mosquera and keep his podium position. Young Rabobank rider Robert Gesink slipped two spots in the GC at the end of the day, but was still in the top ten for the time trial,. Levi Leipheimer had the best time at each intermediate time check and went on to win the stage by more than 30 seconds over his teammate and team leader Alberto Contador. Contador later took some offense to Leipheimer seemingly riding with winning the Vuelta in mind, after it had been established earlier that he (Contador) was Astana's team leader. Contador nonetheless rode a very strong time trial as well, enough to retain his golden jersey and put him on the cusp of being the youngest ever to win all three cycling Grand Tours in his career and just the third ever, and first in 27 years, to win the Vuelta and the Giro d'Italia in the same year.

Stage 20 results

	Rider	Team	Time
1	Levi Leipheimer (USA)	Astana	33' 06"
2	Alberto Contador (ESP)	Astana	+ 31"
3	Alejandro Valverde (ESP)	Caisse d'Epargne	+ 31"
4	Carlos Sastre (ESP)	CSC–Saxo Bank	+ 1' 02"
5	David Moncoutié (FRA)	Cofidis	+ 1' 09"
6	Ezequiel Mosquera (ESP)	Xacobeo–Galicia	+ 1' 15"
7	Joaquim Rodríguez (ESP)	Caisse d'Epargne	+ 1' 16"
8	Marzio Bruseghin (ITA)	Lampre	+ 1' 31"
9	Robert Gesink (NED)	Rabobank	+ 1' 37"
10	Andreas Klöden (GER)	Astana	+ 1' 57"

General classification after stage 20

	Rider	Team	Time
1	Alberto Contador (ESP)	Astana	77h 55' 29"
2	Levi Leipheimer (USA)	Astana	+ 46"
3	Carlos Sastre (ESP)	CSC–Saxo Bank	+ 4' 12"
4	Ezequiel Mosquera (ESP)	Xacobeo–Galicia	+ 5' 19"
5	Alejandro Valverde (ESP)	Caisse d'Epargne	+ 6' 00"
6	Joaquim Rodríguez (ESP)	Caisse d'Epargne	+ 6' 50"
7	Robert Gesink (NED)	Rabobank	+ 6' 55"
8	David Moncoutié (FRA)	Cofidis	+ 10' 10"
9	Egoi Martínez (ESP)	Euskaltel–Euskadi	+ 10' 57"
10	Marzio Bruseghin (ITA)	Lampre	+ 11' 56"

=== Stage 21 ===
21 September 2008 – San Sebastián de los Reyes to Madrid, 102 km

The sprinters got the final say in one last mad dash for the line in the traditional closing city.

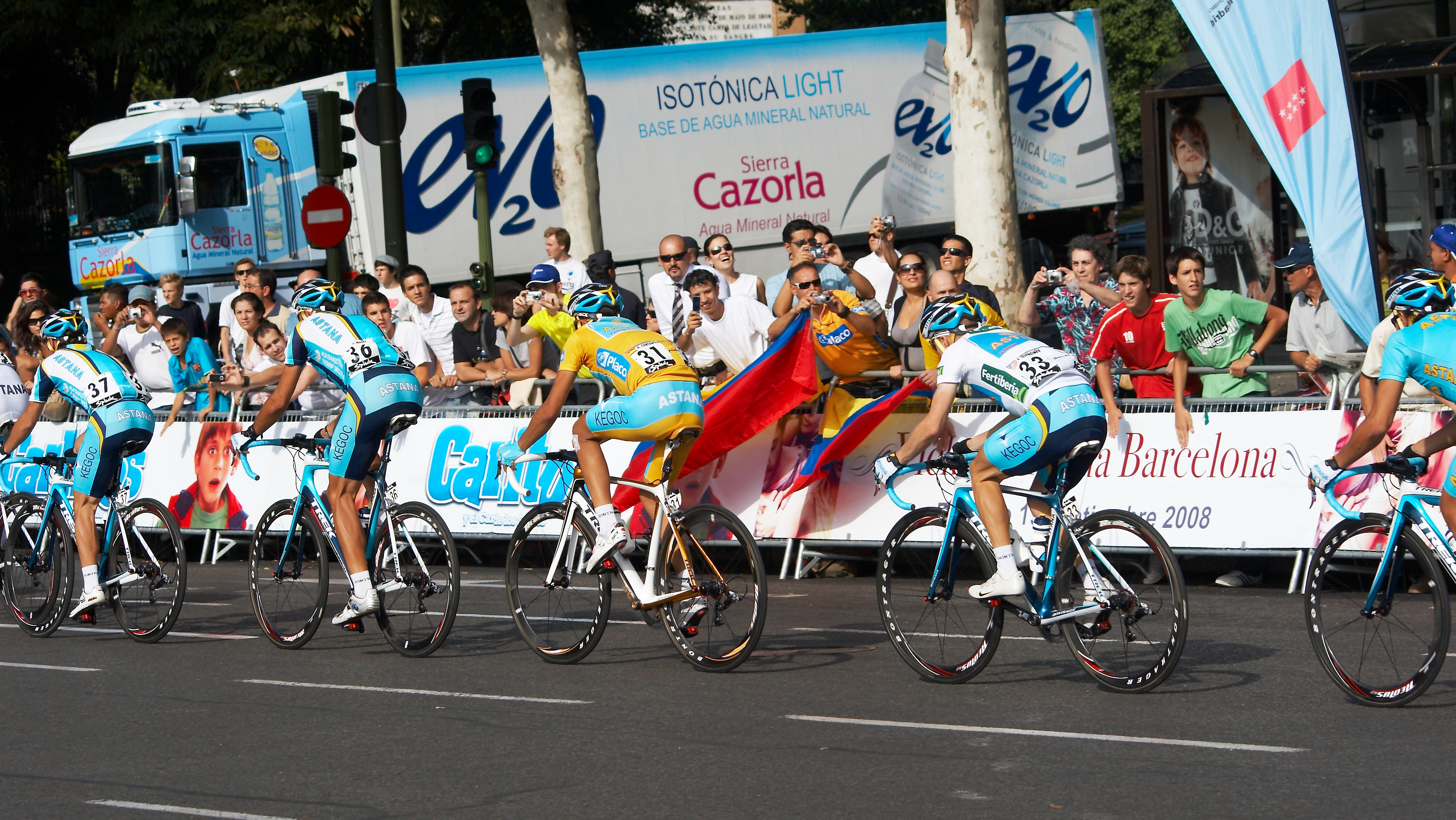
The Astana team leading Vuelta champion Contador into Madrid.

As is tradition when the last day of a Grand Tour is a road stage, this was a straightforward day of racing with no attacking before reaching the closing city. Once on the Madrid circuit, many riders tried to break free of the pack, but none ultimately succeeded – the group was all one in the eighth and final lap. During that eighth lap, two huge crashes thinned the field considerably and limited who could challenge for the stage win. Among the riders to fall was Vuelta champion Alberto Contador. They took place inside 3 kilometers to the finish line, and since this was a flat stage, everyone who fell was given the same finishing time as the group they were in upon falling, which meant the entire field got the same finishing time. The stage was won by CSC's Matti Breschel.

Stage 21 results

	Rider	Team	Time
1	Matti Breschel (DEN)	CSC–Saxo Bank	2h 44' 39"
2	Alexandre Usov (BLR)	Ag2r–La Mondiale	s.t.
3	Davide Viganò (ITA)	Quick-Step	s.t.
4	Koldo Fernández (ESP)	Euskaltel–Euskadi	s.t.
5	Greg Van Avermaet (BEL)	Silence–Lotto	s.t.
6	Mauro Santambrogio (ITA)	Lampre	s.t.
7	Sebastian Lang (GER)	Gerolsteiner	s.t.
8	Sébastien Hinault (FRA)	Crédit Agricole	s.t.
9	Lloyd Mondory (FRA)	Ag2r–La Mondiale	s.t.
10	Xavier Florencio (ESP)	Bouygues Télécom	s.t.

Final General Classification

	Rider	Team	Time
1	Alberto Contador (ESP)	Astana	80h 40' 08"
2	Levi Leipheimer (USA)	Astana	+ 46"
3	Carlos Sastre (ESP)	CSC–Saxo Bank	+ 4' 12"
4	Ezequiel Mosquera (ESP)	Xacobeo–Galicia	+ 5' 19"
5	Alejandro Valverde (ESP)	Caisse d'Epargne	+ 6' 00"
6	Joaquim Rodríguez (ESP)	Caisse d'Epargne	+ 6' 50"
7	Robert Gesink (NED)	Rabobank	+ 6' 55"
8	David Moncoutié (FRA)	Cofidis	+ 10' 10"
9	Egoi Martínez (ESP)	Euskaltel–Euskadi	+ 10' 57"
10	Marzio Bruseghin (ITA)	Lampre	+ 11' 56"
