= 2008 Vuelta a España, Stage 1 to Stage 11 =

Cycling race stages

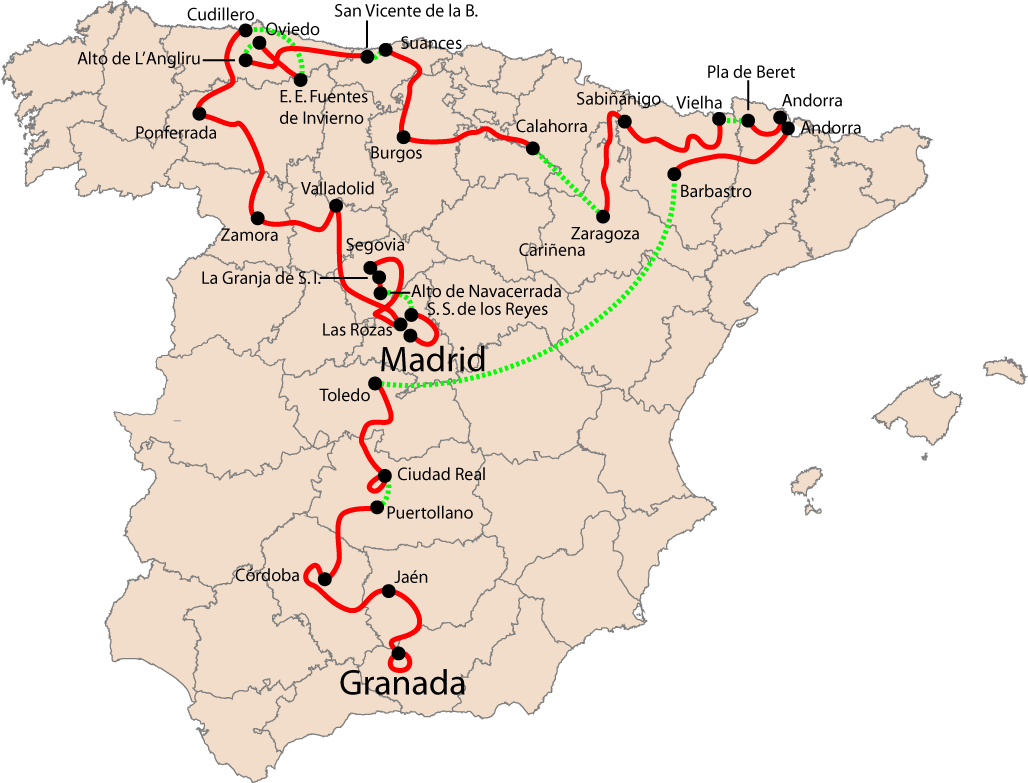
Overview of the stages

These are the individual stages of the 2008 Vuelta a España, with Stage 1 on 30 August and Stage 11 on 10 September.

== Stages ==
=== Stage 1 ===
30 August 2008 – Granada, 7 km (TTT)

The 2008 Vuelta began with a short team time trial over a perfectly flat course in the city of Granada.

The Italian Liquigas team was the unexpected winner of the team time trial. They finished in 8' 21", more than ten seconds clear of the supposed favorites Astana and CSC–Saxo Bank. Euskaltel–Euskadi also finished well; the Basques were eight seconds back of Liquigas at the end, for second place, despite having the best time at the intermediate time check. Filippo Pozzato donned the first golden jersey at the head of the General classification.

Stage 1 result

	Team	Time
1	(Italy) Liquigas	8' 21"
2	(Spain) Euskaltel–Euskadi	+ 8"
3	(Spain) Caisse d'Epargne	+ 9"
4	(Belgium) Quick-Step	+ 10"
5	(Denmark) CSC–Saxo Bank	+ 11"
6	(Italy) Tinkoff Credit Systems	+ 12"
7	(Netherlands) Rabobank	+ 13"
8	(Luxembourg) Astana	+ 14"
9	(Germany) Team Milram	+ 15"
10	(Germany) Gerolsteiner	+ 18"

General classification after Stage 1

	Rider	Team	Time
1	Filippo Pozzato (ITA)	Liquigas	8' 21"
2	Valerio Agnoli (ITA)	Liquigas	+ 0"
3	Manuel Quinziato (ITA)	Liquigas	+ 0"
4	Daniele Bennati (ITA)	Liquigas	+ 0"
5	Alessandro Vanotti (ITA)	Liquigas	+ 0"
6	Enrico Franzoi (ITA)	Liquigas	+ 0"
7	Gorazd Štangelj (SLO)	Liquigas	+ 0"
8	Igor Antón (ESP)	Euskaltel–Euskadi	+ 8"
9	Koldo Fernández (ESP)	Euskaltel–Euskadi	+ 8"
10	Mikel Astarloza (ESP)	Euskaltel–Euskadi	+ 8"

=== Stage 2 ===
31 August 2008 – Granada to Jaén, 167 km

The first regular stage of the Vuelta included its first climb, the third category hill at Las Encebras, and featured a 25 kilometer circuit in the city of Jaén before the finish. The cyclists took two laps of this circuit before the final finishing line. It was thought that it would ensure a sprint finish.

Just as he had in the Tour de France earlier in the season, Alejandro Valverde won the first regular stage of the Vuelta. The successful breakaway of the day involved Jesús Rosendo, Egoi Martínez, Cyril Lemoine, and Mikhail Ignatiev. They held a maximum advantage of 4' 30" on the main field, but were caught 20 kilometers before the finish. Valverde's Caisse d'Epargne teammates successfully cracked the main field on the way into Jaén, launching attacks that kept anyone but Valverde going clear, as he did, with a 2-second advantage on the field. Thanks to that and time bonuses at the line, Valverde took the overall lead in the race.

Stage 2 results

	Rider	Team	Time
1	Alejandro Valverde (ESP)	Caisse d'Epargne	4h 23' 00"
2	Davide Rebellin (ITA)	Gerolsteiner	+ 2"
3	Alessandro Ballan (ITA)	Lampre	s.t.
4	Greg Van Avermaet (BEL)	Silence–Lotto	s.t.
5	Filippo Pozzato (ITA)	Liquigas	s.t.
6	Rinaldo Nocentini (ITA)	Ag2r–La Mondiale	s.t.
7	Erik Zabel (GER)	Team Milram	s.t.
8	Paolo Bettini (ITA)	Quick-Step	s.t.
9	Philippe Gilbert (BEL)	Française des Jeux	s.t.
10	Xavier Florencio (ESP)	Bouygues Télécom	s.t.

General classification after Stage 2

	Rider	Team	Time
1	Alejandro Valverde (ESP)	Caisse d'Epargne	4h 31' 10"
2	Filippo Pozzato (ITA)	Liquigas	+ 13"
3	Daniele Bennati (ITA)	Liquigas	+ 13"
4	Egoi Martínez (ESP)	Euskaltel–Euskadi	+ 15"
5	Iñigo Landaluze (ESP)	Euskaltel–Euskadi	+ 19"
6	Davide Rebellin (ITA)	Gerolsteiner	+ 19"
7	Mauricio Ardila (COL)	Rabobank	+ 20"
8	Igor Antón (ESP)	Euskaltel–Euskadi	+ 21"
9	Rubén Pérez (ESP)	Euskaltel–Euskadi	+ 21"
10	Mikel Astarloza (ESP)	Euskaltel–Euskadi	+ 21"

=== Stage 3 ===
1 September 2008 – Jaén to Córdoba, 168 km

This stage was gently undulating until the third category climb up San Jerónimo, which began 26 kilometers from the finish line. It was thought that this might break up the field and keep a mass sprint from happening, which partially came true.

Andalucía-Cajasur rider Manuel Ortega broke away from the main field almost immediately after the official start of the stage. Alone, he held a maximum advantage of over 15 minutes before the pack, paced by the race leader's team Caisse d'Epargne, began to draw him back. Their pace was extremely lax, slower than the slowest predicted team by the Vuelta's organizers, but eventually they did begin to reel Ortega in. Liquigas later came forward to set a faster pace, one that cracked about a third of the field on the way up the Alto de San Jerónimo climb. A breakaway led by Paolo Bettini caught Ortega with 17 kilometers to go, but Bettini's breakaway itself was caught 4 kilometers in front of the line. A bunched sprint saw Tom Boonen win the stage. With bonus seconds won for second place at the line and in intermediate sprints, Daniele Bennati became the third golden jersey wearer in as many days.

Stage 3 results

	Rider	Team	Time
1	Tom Boonen (BEL)	Quick-Step	4h 25' 24"
2	Daniele Bennati (ITA)	Liquigas	s.t.
3	Erik Zabel (GER)	Team Milram	s.t.
4	Koldo Fernández (ESP)	Euskaltel–Euskadi	s.t.
5	Nicolas Roche (IRL)	Crédit Agricole	s.t.
6	Greg Van Avermaet (BEL)	Silence–Lotto	s.t.
7	Leonardo Duque (COL)	Cofidis	s.t.
8	Sébastien Hinault (FRA)	Crédit Agricole	s.t.
9	Tom Stamsnijder (NED)	Gerolsteiner	s.t.
10	Lloyd Mondory (FRA)	Ag2r–La Mondiale	s.t.

General classification after Stage 3

	Rider	Team	Time
1	Daniele Bennati (ITA)	Liquigas	8h 56' 21"
2	Alejandro Valverde (ESP)	Caisse d'Epargne	+ 7"
3	Tom Boonen (BEL)	Quick-Step	+ 10"
4	Filippo Pozzato (ITA)	Liquigas	+ 20"
5	Egoi Martínez (ESP)	Euskaltel–Euskadi	+ 22"
6	Davide Rebellin (ITA)	Gerolsteiner	+ 26"
7	Iñigo Landaluze (ESP)	Euskaltel–Euskadi	+ 26"
8	Erik Zabel (GER)	Team Milram	+ 27"
9	Mauricio Ardila (COL)	Rabobank	+ 27"
10	Igor Antón (ESP)	Euskaltel–Euskadi	+ 28"

=== Stage 4 ===
2 September 2008 – Córdoba to Puertollano, 170 km

This stage saw the riders leave the autonomous community of Andalusia and enter Castile-La Mancha. There were two third-category climbs along the way, but the final 60 kilometers were almost perfectly flat, and a bunched sprint finish was expected.

An Andalucía-Cajasur rider again launched a solo attack that kept him out in front of the field for most of the day. For this stage, that rider was José Antonio López, who broke away at the 9 kilometer mark and attained a maximum advantage of 8' 06" as the bunch took it easy for the first two and a half hours before finally increasing their speed. The field was paced by the race leader's team Liquigas as well as the team of the man who won the stage the previous day and poised to do so again, Tom Boonen's Quick Step mates. López held on as long as he could, and was caught at the 8 kilometers to go mark. Another classic sprint finish saw the stage victory go to race leader Daniele Bennati. A crash at the 3 kilometers to go mark fractured the field and limited the riders who could contest the finish to those already at the front of the pack. While a crash within the final 3 kilometers normally affords everyone involved the same finishing time as the one attained by the group they were in upon crashing, race officials later declared that this crash took place just outside 3 kilometers from the line, and all time lost by those involved would stand as time lost.

Stage 4 results

	Rider	Team	Time
1	Daniele Bennati (ITA)	Liquigas	4h 27' 54"
2	Tom Boonen (BEL)	Quick-Step	s.t.
3	Koldo Fernández (ESP)	Euskaltel–Euskadi	s.t.
4	Danilo Napolitano (ITA)	Lampre	s.t.
5	Erik Zabel (GER)	Team Milram	s.t.
6	Greg Van Avermaet (BEL)	Silence–Lotto	s.t.
7	Wouter Weylandt (BEL)	Quick-Step	s.t.
8	Davide Viganò (ITA)	Quick-Step	s.t.
9	Nicolas Roche (IRL)	Crédit Agricole	+ 3"
10	Sylvain Chavanel (FRA)	Cofidis	s.t.

General classification after Stage 4

	Rider	Team	Time
1	Daniele Bennati (ITA)	Liquigas	13h 23' 57"
2	Tom Boonen (BEL)	Quick-Step	+ 22"
3	Alejandro Valverde (ESP)	Caisse d'Epargne	+ 48"
4	Erik Zabel (GER)	Team Milram	+ 51"
5	Igor Antón (ESP)	Euskaltel–Euskadi	+ 59"
6	Juan Manuel Gárate (ESP)	Quick-Step	+ 1' 01"
7	Alessandro Ballan (ITA)	Lampre	+ 1' 02"
8	Greg Van Avermaet (BEL)	Silence–Lotto	+ 1' 04"
9	Juan Antonio Flecha (ESP)	Rabobank	+ 1' 04"
10	Egoi Martínez (ESP)	Euskaltel–Euskadi	+ 1' 05"

=== Stage 5 ===
3 September 2008 – Ciudad Real, 42 km (ITT)

The first individual time trial of the Vuelta took place on a completely flat course in Ciudad Real. It was predicted that the winner would have an average of speed of over 50 km/h.

The early time to beat was set by Manuel Quinziato of Liquigas, blowing away the times that had come before him by more than a minute. Around an hour after Quinziato's ride, a pack of General classification favorites took the course, and the first of them, Astana's Levi Leipheimer, clocked in 33 seconds better than Quinziato, and held on to win the stage as well as the next golden jersey. The only other man to beat Quinziato on the day was something of a surprise, Sylvain Chavanel of Cofidis, who is not normally known, in international competition, for his time trialling skills. The other contenders all turned in strong rides, leaving the GC tightly bunched with the Pyrenees looming.

Stage 5 results

	Rider	Team	Time
1	Levi Leipheimer (USA)	Astana	50'57"
2	Sylvain Chavanel (FRA)	Cofidis	+ 12"
3	Manuel Quinziato (ITA)	Liquigas	+ 33"
4	Alberto Contador (ESP)	Astana	+ 49"
5	Alejandro Valverde (ESP)	Caisse d'Epargne	+ 59"
6	Jurgen Van Goolen (BEL)	CSC–Saxo Bank	+1' 06"
7	Michael Blaudzun (DEN)	CSC–Saxo Bank	+1' 07"
8	Martin Velits (SVK)	Team Milram	+1' 15"
9	Dominique Cornu (BEL)	Silence–Lotto	+1' 19"
10	Sebastian Lang (GER)	Gerolsteiner	+1' 19"

General classification after Stage 5

	Rider	Team	Time
1	Levi Leipheimer (USA)	Astana	14h16'11"
2	Sylvain Chavanel (FRA)	Cofidis	+ 2"
3	Alejandro Valverde (ESP)	Caisse d'Epargne	+ 30"
4	Tom Boonen (BEL)	Quick-Step	+ 32"
5	Alberto Contador (ESP)	Astana	+ 47"
6	Jurgen Van Goolen (BEL)	CSC–Saxo Bank	+ 1' 26"
7	Carlos Sastre (ESP)	CSC–Saxo Bank	+ 1' 27"
8	Daniele Bennati (ITA)	Liquigas	+ 1' 38"
9	Dominique Cornu (BEL)	Silence–Lotto	+ 1' 48"
10	Juan Antonio Flecha (ESP)	Rabobank	+ 1' 51"

=== Stage 6 ===
4 September 2008 – Ciudad Real to Toledo, 150 km

In what was the last stage branded as flat before the Vuelta entered the mountains, there was one third-category climb 50 kilometers before the finish. After that peak, there was a sharp descent and a flat section with two intermediate sprints before the altitude dropped again in the city of Toledo. The finish was on a slight uphill, which was thought to test the sprinters' limits in what was expected nonetheless to be a mass finish.

The day's successful breakaway formed after about 7 kilometers, involving Iban Mayoz, Mikhail Ignatiev, and Volodymyr Dyudya. The team that paced the pack in efforts to bring them back was Cofidis, looking to have one solid group at the intermediate sprints later in the course so Sylvain Chavanel could make up the 2 second gap he had to race leader Levi Leipheimer. There was a big crash in the pack at the 68 kilometer mark, mostly involving riders from Silence-Lotto, Quick Step, Xacobeo-Galicia, and Bouygues Télécom, as well as Alejandro Valverde and Tom Boonen, who later called on the race doctor for some medical attention. The Cofidis-paced main field caught the break at the 108 kilometer mark, just after the one categorized climb of the day and just before the intermediate sprints. Shortly afterward, the blistering pace set by Cofidis, along with some crosswinds, led to another crash, at the 112 kilometer mark. Chavanel won the two intermediate sprints and became the new overall leader of the Vuelta on the road, thanks to the twelve bonus seconds he won with them. Numerous riders attacked on the way into Toledo and a pack led by Paolo Bettini, who won the sprint to the line, was the successful one. The field in fact fractured quite a bit - there were six large groups separated, collectively, by less than a minute at the end of the stage.

Stage 6 results

	Rider	Team	Time
1	Paolo Bettini (ITA)	Quick-Step	3h 19' 28"
2	Philippe Gilbert (BEL)	Française des Jeux	s.t.
3	Alejandro Valverde (ESP)	Caisse d'Epargne	s.t.
4	Óscar Freire (ESP)	Rabobank	s.t.
5	Daniele Bennati (ITA)	Liquigas	s.t.
6	Davide Rebellin (ITA)	Quick-Step	s.t.
7	Sébastien Hinault (FRA)	Crédit Agricole	s.t.
8	Greg Van Avermaet (BEL)	Silence–Lotto	s.t.
9	Karsten Kroon (NED)	CSC–Saxo Bank	s.t.
10	Matti Breschel (DEN)	CSC–Saxo Bank	s.t.

General classification after Stage 6

	Rider	Team	Time
1	Sylvain Chavanel (FRA)	Cofidis	17h 35' 35"
2	Levi Leipheimer (USA)	Astana	+ 10"
3	Alejandro Valverde (ESP)	Caisse d'Epargne	+ 26"
4	Alberto Contador (ESP)	Astana	+ 57"
5	Carlos Sastre (ESP)	CSC–Saxo Bank	+ 1' 37"
6	Daniele Bennati (ITA)	Liquigas	+ 1' 42"
7	Jurgen Van Goolen (BEL)	CSC–Saxo Bank	+ 1' 44"
8	Juan Antonio Flecha (ESP)	Rabobank	+ 2' 01"
9	Dominique Cornu (BEL)	Silence–Lotto	+ 2' 06"
10	Daniel Moreno (ESP)	Caisse d'Epargne	+ 2' 20"

=== Rest day ===
5 September 2008

=== Stage 7 ===
6 September 2008 – Barbastro to Naturlandia-La Rabassa (Andorra), 223 km

The longest stage of the 2008 Vuelta, as well as one of the most mountainous, the first action after the rest day was a stern test for the riders. There were four categorized climbs along the way, one each in the first, second, and third categories with a special category climb at the finish in Andorra making this stage a playground for riders who like to battle gravity.

This day belonged to Alessandro Ballan. He was part of a five-man group, along with Marc de Maar, Iñigo Landaluze, Gianni Meersman, and Xabier Zandio, that broke away at the 18 kilometer mark, and stayed out in front of the field all day to claim the stage win. He had other prizes awaiting him at the podium in Andorra, namely the golden jersey (giving the Vuelta its sixth different overall leader in seven stages), the red jersey, and the white jersey. He was also only 7 points shy of claiming the blue jersey. The route was marked by terrible weather, in particular rain and cold temperatures, which Ballan would later say helped him win, in that he is accustomed to such weather living in northern Italy.

The lead Ballan's breakaway had over the pack grew to a maximum of just under eleven minutes before Astana, the team of GC hopefuls Levi Leipheimer and Alberto Contador, took the pace of the main field to try to reel them in. Their pace was so blisteringly fast that it cracked more than two-thirds of the field, members of which dropped as much as thirty minutes behind them. When Astana ratcheted up its speed, the breakaway did as well, as Zandio was dropped, falling minutes behind them. Ballan attacked from his group and got free at the 14 kilometers to go mark and quickly attained a lead of two minutes over the other three, staying out front to win the stage. The elite main group led by Astana caught the other members of the day's breakaway, and attacked and jockeyed for position at the finish some three minutes behind Ballan.

Stage 7 results

	Rider	Team	Time
1	Alessandro Ballan (ITA)	Lampre	6h 15' 51"
2	Ezequiel Mosquera (ESP)	Xacobeo–Galicia	+ 2' 42"
3	Alberto Contador (ESP)	Astana	+ 2' 45"
4	Joaquim Rodríguez (ESP)	Caisse d'Epargne	+ 2' 50"
5	Levi Leipheimer (USA)	Astana	s.t.
6	Igor Antón (ESP)	Euskaltel–Euskadi	s.t.
7	Carlos Sastre (ESP)	CSC–Saxo Bank	s.t.
8	Daniel Moreno (ESP)	Caisse d'Epargne	+ 3' 03"
9	Marzio Bruseghin (ITA)	Lampre	+ 3' 11"
10	Davide Rebellin (ITA)	Gerolsteiner	s.t.

General classification after Stage 7

	Rider	Team	Time
1	Alessandro Ballan (ITA)	Lampre	25h 53' 26"
2	Levi Leipheimer (USA)	Astana	+ 1' 00"
3	Sylvain Chavanel (FRA)	Cofidis	+ 1' 21"
4	Alberto Contador (ESP)	Astana	+ 1' 34"
5	Alejandro Valverde (ESP)	Caisse d'Epargne	+ 2' 06"
6	Carlos Sastre (ESP)	CSC–Saxo Bank	+ 2' 27"
7	Jurgen Van Goolen (BEL)	CSC–Saxo Bank	+ 2' 59"
8	Ezequiel Mosquera (ESP)	Xacobeo–Galicia	+ 2' 59"
9	Igor Antón (ESP)	Euskaltel–Euskadi	+ 3' 17"
10	Daniel Moreno (ESP)	Caisse d'Epargne	+ 3' 23"

=== Stage 8 ===
7 September 2008 – Escaldes-Engordany (Andorra) to Plá de Beret, 151 km

This short, yet extremely mountainous, stage was thought to invite many early attacks, as the race re-entered Spain. There were three first category climbs on the course, and the finish was on a slight downhill after the Alto de Plá de Beret. This stage also featured the highest point in the 2008 Vuelta, the first-category Port de la Bonaigua, at 2,070 meters in elevation.

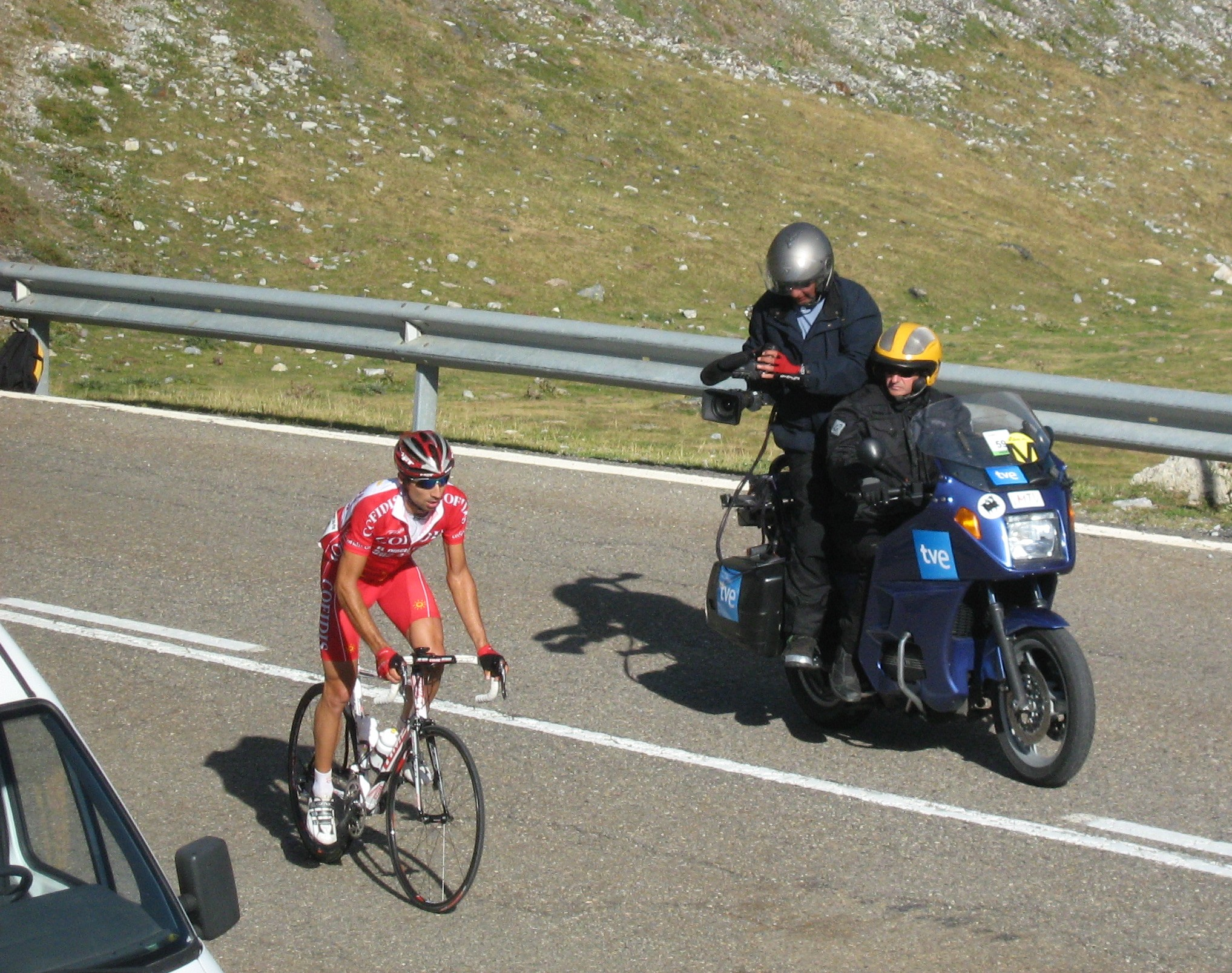
Moncoutié climbing the Puerto de la Bonaigua on his way to the stage win.

Many riders attempted to break away from the pack from the outset, but no one was successful until an hour had been spent in the saddle and 38 kilometers covered. The five that broke free were Christophe Kern, Nikita Eskov, Juan Manuel Gárate, Sébastien Joly, and David Moncoutié. Their lead quickly rose to three minutes as Garate was the first over the first-category climb El Cantó. It held steady until the category two climb up Eviny 27 kilometers later, and then grew to a maximum of 5' 30" before Astana, again, was the team to come forward to pace the main field. Astana's sporting director Johan Bruyneel explained that this was more to keep things steady, after the race leader's team Lampre dropped off the pace, than to bring the breakaway back, since no one in it was a GC threat.

The autobus formed going up the Puerto de la Bonaigua as Andreas Klöden set an extremely fast pace. Among the many riders to fall into the autobus was race leader Alessandro Ballan. In short order, Levi Leipheimer effectively became the new race leader on the road, as Ballan dropped well back of the main field, which caught every breakaway rider except Moncoutié before the summit of the Bonaigua. Though his advantage continued to shrink, Moncoutié managed to stay out front just long enough to win the stage, with the main chase group, an elite bunch of a dozen or so riders who were able to take Klöden's pace, 34 seconds back. Alejandro Valverde and Alberto Contador traded repeated attacks on the way up to Plá de Beret, gaining themselves as well as Igor Antón five potentially valuable seconds over other contenders such as Leipheimer, Carlos Sastre, and Ezequiel Mosquera. Valverde and Contador went on to don leader's jerseys after the stage, Valverde the blue points jersey and Contador the white combined classification jersey.

Stage 8 results

	Rider	Team	Time
1	David Moncoutié (FRA)	Cofidis	4h 24' 58"
2	Alejandro Valverde (ESP)	Caisse d'Epargne	+ 34"
3	Alberto Contador (ESP)	Astana	s.t.
4	Igor Antón (ESP)	Euskaltel–Euskadi	s.t.
5	Joaquim Rodríguez (ESP)	Caisse d'Epargne	+ 39"
6	Daniel Moreno (ESP)	Caisse d'Epargne	s.t.
7	Oliver Zaugg (SUI)	Gerolsteiner	s.t.
8	Levi Leipheimer (USA)	Astana	s.t.
9	David Arroyo (ESP)	Caisse d'Epargne	s.t.
10	Carlos Sastre (ESP)	CSC–Saxo Bank	s.t.

General classification after Stage 8

	Rider	Team	Time
1	Levi Leipheimer (USA)	Astana	28h 20' 03"
2	Alberto Contador (ESP)	Astana	+ 21"
3	Alejandro Valverde (ESP)	Caisse d'Epargne	+ 49"
4	Carlos Sastre (ESP)	CSC–Saxo Bank	+ 1' 27"
5	Ezequiel Mosquera (ESP)	Xacobeo–Galicia	+ 1' 59"
6	Igor Antón (ESP)	Euskaltel–Euskadi	+ 2' 12"
7	Daniel Moreno (ESP)	Caisse d'Epargne	+ 2' 23"
8	Jurgen Van Goolen (BEL)	CSC–Saxo Bank	+ 2' 43"
9	Robert Gesink (NED)	Rabobank	+ 3' 11"
10	Marzio Bruseghin (ITA)	Lampre	+ 3' 35"

=== Stage 9 ===
8 September 2008 – Vielha e Mijaran to Sabiñánigo, 200 km

This stage was thought to see a winning breakaway, and did. There were four categorized climbs along the way, including the first-category Puerto de Serrablo 66 kilometers before the finish, to keep the teams of the sprinters from taking control of the race.

Being faced almost immediately with the second-category Alto del Túnel and, not long after, the second-category Coll de l'Espina, no breakaway came successfully clear of the bunch for over an hour. When David Moncoutié topped l'Espina in first position, he took over the King of the Mountains lead from Alessandro Ballan. He later cemented this by topping the Puerto de Serrablo in first place as well.

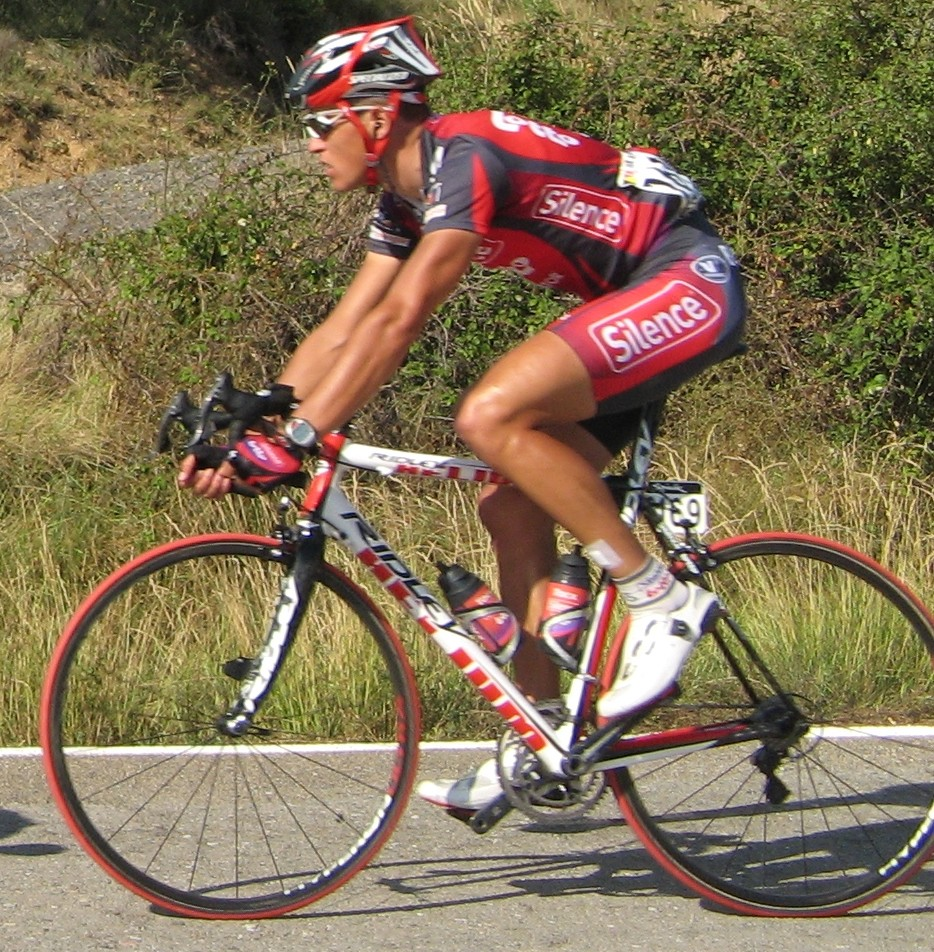
Stage 9 winner Greg Van Avermaet.

The race leader's team Astana again set a very fast pace at the head of the main field, such that it fractured into three large groups, with all the major GC contenders in the first group. Finally, after 60 kilometers and close to two hours in the saddle, a 12-man group broke free, attaining an advantage of close to seven minutes. The best-placed man in the breakaway, Euskaltel-Euskadi rider Egoi Martínez, threatened the overall lead of Levi Leipheimer as he was 6' 41" back at the beginning of the day. Team CSC Saxo Bank and Caisse d'Epargne tried to pull the main field along fast enough so that the time gap to the breakaway would be small enough that Leipheimer's Astana Team would have to work to keep him in gold, but the strategy didn't work. Astana eventually retook the pace and willfully let the time gap go low enough so that when all was done at the day's end, Martínez had taken enough time back to become the new holder of the golden jersey. This move was criticized the next day by several local newspapers.

Eleven of the riders in the breakaway finished in Sabiñánigo together, and the sprint to the line was won by Silence-Lotto rider Greg Van Avermaet. The main field, which had consolidated to almost all other riders in the race, finished 6' 42" back (Martínez also gained bonus seconds in intermediate sprints, leading to his 11-second lead in the GC after this stage).

Stage 9 results

	Rider	Team	Time
1	Greg Van Avermaet (BEL)	Silence–Lotto	4h 57' 22"
2	Davide Rebellin (ITA)	Gerolsteiner	s.t.
3	Juan Antonio Flecha (ESP)	Rabobank	s.t.
4	Rinaldo Nocentini (ITA)	Ag2r–La Mondiale	s.t.
5	Damiano Cunego (ITA)	Lampre	s.t.
6	Xabier Zandio (ESP)	Caisse d'Epargne	s.t.
7	Patrice Halgand (FRA)	Crédit Agricole	s.t.
8	Andrea Tonti (ITA)	Quick-Step	s.t.
9	Christophe Kern (FRA)	Crédit Agricole	s.t.
10	Egoi Martínez (ESP)	Euskaltel–Euskadi	s.t.

General classification after Stage 9

	Rider	Team	Time
1	Egoi Martínez (ESP)	Euskaltel–Euskadi	33h 23' 56"
2	Levi Leipheimer (USA)	Astana	+ 11"
3	Alberto Contador (ESP)	Astana	+ 32"
4	Alejandro Valverde (ESP)	Caisse d'Epargne	+ 1' 00"
5	Carlos Sastre (ESP)	CSC–Saxo Bank	+ 1' 38"
6	Ezequiel Mosquera (ESP)	Xacobeo–Galicia	+ 2' 10"
7	Igor Antón (ESP)	Euskaltel–Euskadi	+ 2' 23"
8	Daniel Moreno (ESP)	Caisse d'Epargne	+ 2' 34"
9	Jurgen Van Goolen (BEL)	CSC–Saxo Bank	+ 2' 54"
10	Robert Gesink (NED)	Rabobank	+ 3' 22"

=== Stage 10 ===
9 September 2008 – Sabiñánigo to Zaragoza, 151 km

After the climb up and descent from the second-category Puerto de Monrepós after just 34 kilometers, this stage was almost completely flat and saw a mass sprint finish. The finishing city of Zaragoza is a traditional one in the Vuelta, having hosted stage finishes on 47 occasions. The wind that the city is known for was thought to wreak some havoc on the sprinters.

This was a rather straightforward day of racing. There were a few breakaway attempts in the first hour, but none succeeded. The breakaway that did succeed involved a single rider, Milram's Matej Jurčo, who the Euskaltel team let free after 37 kilometers. His maximum advantage grew to 7' 20" before Quick Step and Rabobank, working for Tom Boonen and Óscar Freire, respectively, pulled the bunch ahead to bring him back and ensure a mass sprint finish. Jurčo took both intermediate sprints, and was briefly joined in his effort by José Antonio López as the main field neared him, but the pack became one again with 8 kilometers to the line. The bunched sprint was won by Sébastien Hinault, and the GC was unchanged by the day's results.

Stage 10 results

	Rider	Team	Time
1	Sébastien Hinault (FRA)	Crédit Agricole	3h 22' 21"
2	Lloyd Mondory (FRA)	Ag2r–La Mondiale	s.t.
3	Greg Van Avermaet (BEL)	Silence–Lotto	s.t.
4	Óscar Freire (ESP)	Rabobank	s.t.
5	Tom Boonen (BEL)	Quick-Step	s.t.
6	Koldo Fernández (ESP)	Euskaltel–Euskadi	s.t.
7	Alexandre Usov (BLR)	Ag2r–La Mondiale	s.t.
8	Xavier Florencio (ESP)	Bouygues Télécom	s.t.
9	Juan José Haedo (ARG)	CSC–Saxo Bank	s.t.
10	Nikita Eskov (RUS)	Tinkoff Credit Systems	s.t.

General classification after Stage 10

	Rider	Team	Time
1	Egoi Martínez (ESP)	Euskaltel–Euskadi	36h 46' 17"
2	Levi Leipheimer (USA)	Astana	+ 11"
3	Alberto Contador (ESP)	Astana	+ 32"
4	Alejandro Valverde (ESP)	Caisse d'Epargne	+ 1' 00"
5	Carlos Sastre (ESP)	CSC–Saxo Bank	+ 1' 38"
6	Ezequiel Mosquera (ESP)	Xacobeo–Galicia	+ 2' 10"
7	Igor Antón (ESP)	Euskaltel–Euskadi	+ 2' 23"
8	Daniel Moreno (ESP)	Caisse d'Epargne	+ 2' 34"
9	Jurgen Van Goolen (BEL)	CSC–Saxo Bank	+ 2' 54"
10	Robert Gesink (NED)	Rabobank	+ 3' 22"

=== Stage 11 ===
10 September 2008 – Calahorra to Burgos, 178 km

This was branded as a transitional stage, undulating for the 78 kilometers before a gradual increase in elevation that became more steep at the 138 kilometer mark at the third-category Alto de Valmala. After a plateau there, the finish into Burgos was on a lengthy, but slight, downhill.

This, again, was a very normal day of racing. Three riders, Serafín Martínez, Jose Antonio López, and Andriy Hryvko escaped the bunch after 35 kilometers and precisely one hour in the saddle. Their maximum advantage was 7 minutes, but the main field didn't have much trouble reeling them in, which they did 7 kilometers from the line. The majority of the field was together for a bunched sprint finish, which was won by Óscar Freire. The GC was again unchanged by the day's results.

Stage 11 results

	Rider	Team	Time
1	Óscar Freire (ESP)	Rabobank	4h 19' 28"
2	Tom Boonen (BEL)	Quick-Step	s.t.
3	Juan José Haedo (ARG)	CSC–Saxo Bank	s.t.
4	Erik Zabel (GER)	Team Milram	s.t.
5	Lloyd Mondory (FRA)	Ag2r–La Mondiale	s.t.
6	Koldo Fernández (ESP)	Euskaltel–Euskadi	s.t.
7	Xavier Florencio (ESP)	Bouygues Télécom	s.t.
8	Greg Van Avermaet (BEL)	Silence–Lotto	s.t.
9	Danilo Napolitano (ITA)	Lampre	s.t.
10	Heinrich Haussler (GER)	Gerolsteiner	s.t.

General classification after Stage 11

	Rider	Team	Time
1	Egoi Martínez (ESP)	Euskaltel–Euskadi	41h 05' 45"
2	Levi Leipheimer (USA)	Astana	+ 11"
3	Alberto Contador (ESP)	Astana	+ 32"
4	Alejandro Valverde (ESP)	Caisse d'Epargne	+ 1' 00"
5	Carlos Sastre (ESP)	CSC–Saxo Bank	+ 1' 38"
6	Ezequiel Mosquera (ESP)	Xacobeo–Galicia	+ 2' 10"
7	Igor Antón (ESP)	Euskaltel–Euskadi	+ 2' 23"
8	Daniel Moreno (ESP)	Caisse d'Epargne	+ 2' 34"
9	Jurgen Van Goolen (BEL)	CSC–Saxo Bank	+ 2' 54"
10	Robert Gesink (NED)	Rabobank	+ 3' 22"
