= 2005 Volta a la Comunitat Valenciana =

Race details
- Dates: 22–26 February 2005
- Stages: 5
- Distance: 787.4 km (489.3 mi)
- Winning time: 19h 07' 31"

Results
	Winner	Alessandro Petacchi (ITA)	(Fassa Bortolo)
	Second	Aitor Pérez (ESP)	(Spiuk)
	Third	Antonio Colom (ESP)	(Illes Balears–Caisse d'Epargne)

The 2005 Volta a la Comunitat Valenciana was the 63rd edition of the Volta a la Comunitat Valenciana road cycling stage race, which was held from 22 February to 26 February 2005. The race started in Calpe and finished in Valencia. The race was won by Alessandro Petacchi of the Fassa Bortolo team.

== General classification ==
Final general classification

Rank	Rider	Team	Time
1	Alessandro Petacchi (ITA)	Fassa Bortolo	19h 07' 31"
2	Aitor Pérez (ESP)	Spiuk	+ 34"
3	Antonio Colom (ESP)	Illes Balears–Caisse d'Epargne	+ 38"
4	Franco Pellizotti (ITA)	Liquigas–Bianchi	s.t.
5	Javier Cherro (ESP)	Comunidad Valenciana–Elche	+ 39"
6	Xabier Zandio (ESP)	Illes Balears–Caisse d'Epargne	+ 43"
7	David Muñoz (ESP)	Comunidad Valenciana–Elche	+ 45"
8	David Etxebarria (ESP)	Liberty Seguros–Würth	+ 46"
9	José Ruiz Sánchez (ESP)	Andalucía–Paul Versan	s.t.
10	Matthias Kessler (GER)	T-Mobile Team	s.t.
