= Lloyd Mondory =

French road bicycle racer

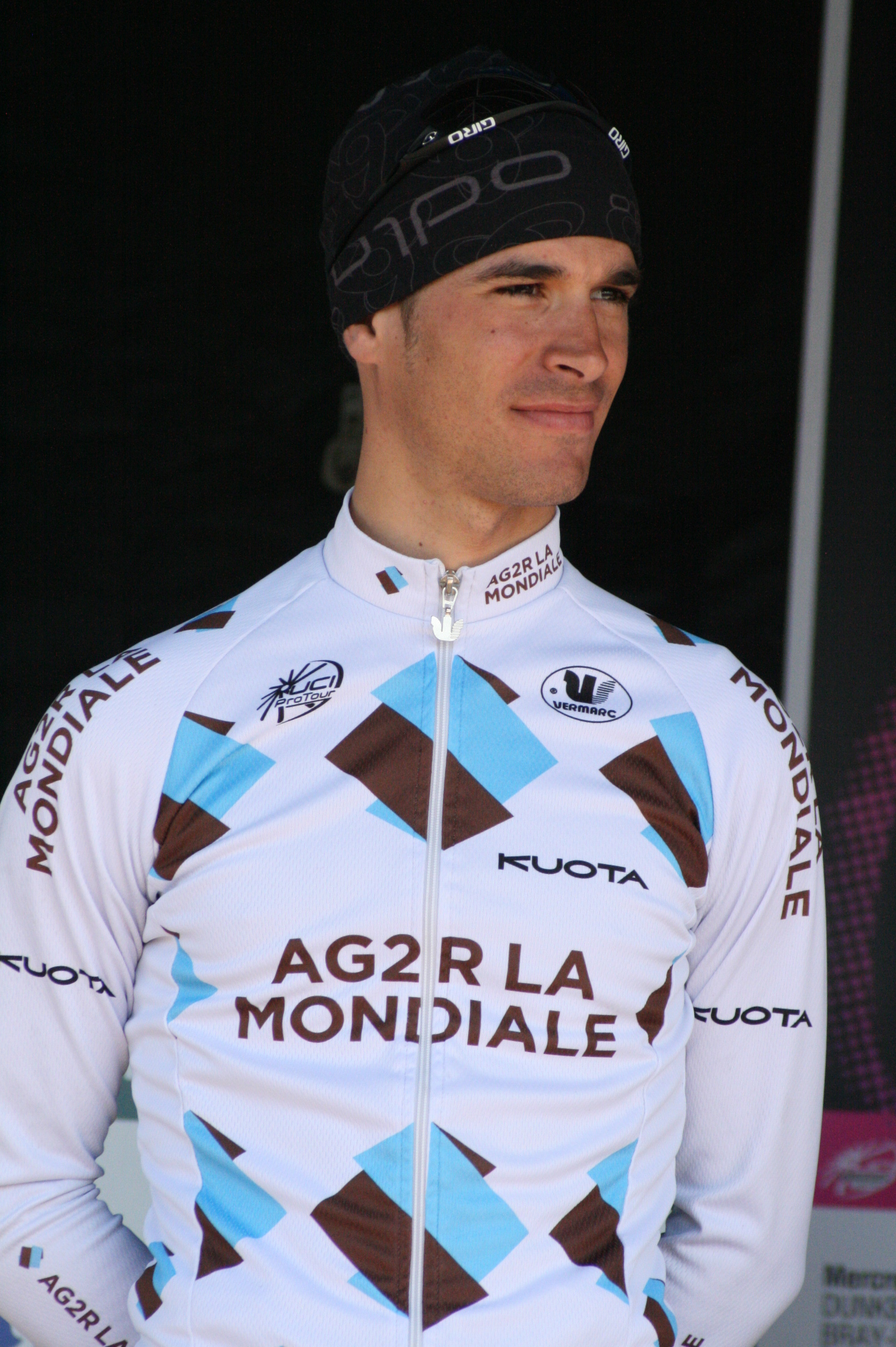
- Mondory at the 2010 Four Days of Dunkirk

Personal information
- Full name: Lloyd Mondory
- Born: 26 April 1982 (age 44) Cognac, France
- Height: 1.75 m (5 ft 9 in)
- Weight: 64 kg (141 lb)

Cycling career
- Sport: Cycling
- Current team: Retired
- Discipline: Road
- Role: Rider

Amateur team
- 2001–2002: Jean Floc'h

Professional team
- 2004–2015: AG2R Prévoyance

Major wins
- Tirreno–Adriatico (2008) Mountains classification

Lloyd Mondory (born 26 April 1982) is a French restaurateur and former professional road bicycle racer. He competed from 2004 to 2015 for the AG2R La Mondiale team, before he was suspended for four years for the use of erythropoietin (EPO). His major career achievements included a victory at the 2008 Grand Prix of Aargau Canton, stage wins in the Étoile de Bessèges, the Vuelta a Burgos and the Paris–Corrèze and second place finish in a stage of the 2008 Vuelta a España.

In March 2015, it was announced that Mondory had tested positive for erythropoietin (EPO) in an out-of-competition test taken on 17 February. On 30 October 2015, the UCI announced that Mondory was suspended until 9 March 2019. Mondory did not return to cycling after his ban ended, instead choosing to focus on his restaurant, Oncle Scott's, in Carentan, which opened in 2016.

== Major results ==
2000
8th Road race, UCI Junior Road World Championships
2002
3rd Classic Loire Atlantique
4th Overall Tour du Loir-et-Cher

1st Stage 2

2003
1st Overall Kreiz Breizh Elites
1st Stage 1 Tour du Loir-et-Cher
3rd Road race, National Under-23 Road Championships
2005
1st Stage 3 Vuelta a Castilla y León
3rd Grand Prix de Denain
5th Overall Tour de Picardie
6th Overall Boucles de la Mayenne
6th Tour de Vendée
8th Ronde van Midden-Zeeland
10th Tartu GP
2006
1st French Road Cycling Cup
3rd Dwars door Vlaanderen
4th Cholet-Pays de Loire
4th Tro-Bro Léon
4th Tour de Vendée
5th Grand Prix de Denain
7th Grand Prix de Villers-Cotterêts
7th Grand Prix de la ville de Rennes
8th Trofeo Alcudia
10th Polynormande
2007
5th Tro-Bro Léon
7th Châteauroux Classic
8th Le Samyn
2008
1st GP Kantons Aargau
1st Mountains classification Tirreno–Adriatico
1st Stage 2 Paris–Corrèze
6th Polynormande
2009
5th Route Adélie
6th Overall Circuit Franco-Belge
9th Polynormande
2010
3rd Tro-Bro Léon
4th Route Adélie
4th Polynormande
6th Memorial Rik Van Steenbergen
9th Le Samyn
9th Scheldeprijs
2011
1st Stage 2 Étoile de Bessèges
2nd Grand Prix de la Somme
5th Gent–Wevelgem
6th Memorial Samyn
7th Overall Paris–Corrèze
8th GP Kanton Aargau Gippingen
2012
5th Overall Tour de Wallonie
5th Tour du Finistère
6th Tro-Bro Léon
6th Boucles de l'Aulne
7th Omloop Het Nieuwsblad
9th Dwars door Vlaanderen
2013
8th Paris–Bourges
2014
1st Stage 4 Vuelta a Burgos
8th Overall Tour de Wallonie
2015
7th Clásica de Almería

=== Grand Tour general classification results timeline ===
Grand Tour	2007	2008	2009	2010	2011	2012	2013	2014
Giro d'Italia	108	—	—	—	—	—	—	—
Tour de France	—	—	133	118	—	—	—	—
Vuelta a España	—	120	—	—	84	104	114	DNF

Legend
—	Did not compete
DNF	Did not finish
