= José Ruiz Sánchez =

Spanish cyclist (born 1980)

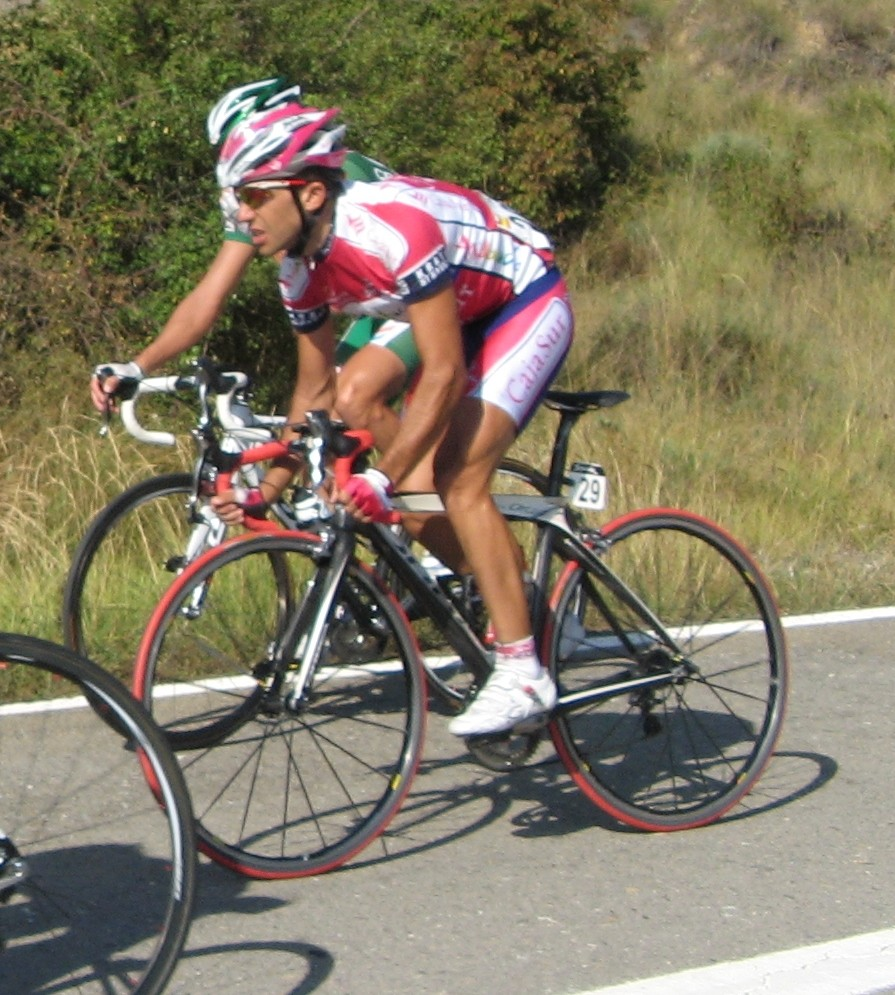

Personal information
- Born: 19 October 1980 (age 45) Villafranca de Córdoba, Spain

Cycling career
- Sport: Cycling
- Current team: Retired
- Discipline: Road
- Role: Rider

Professional team
- 2005–2009: Andalucía–Paul Versan

José Ruiz Sánchez (born 19 October 1980 in Villafranca de Córdoba) is a Spanish former professional road cyclist. During his early career, he was commonly referred to as "El Tarzan" because he would often bike without shoes.

== Major results ==
2005
9th Overall Volta a la Comunitat Valenciana
2008
10th Overall Clásica Internacional de Alcobendas

=== Grand Tour general classification results timeline ===
Grand Tour	2007	2008	2009
Giro d'Italia	—	—	—
Tour de France	—	—	—
Vuelta a España	56	53	118
