= 2008 Vuelta a España =

63rd edition of the Vuelta a España

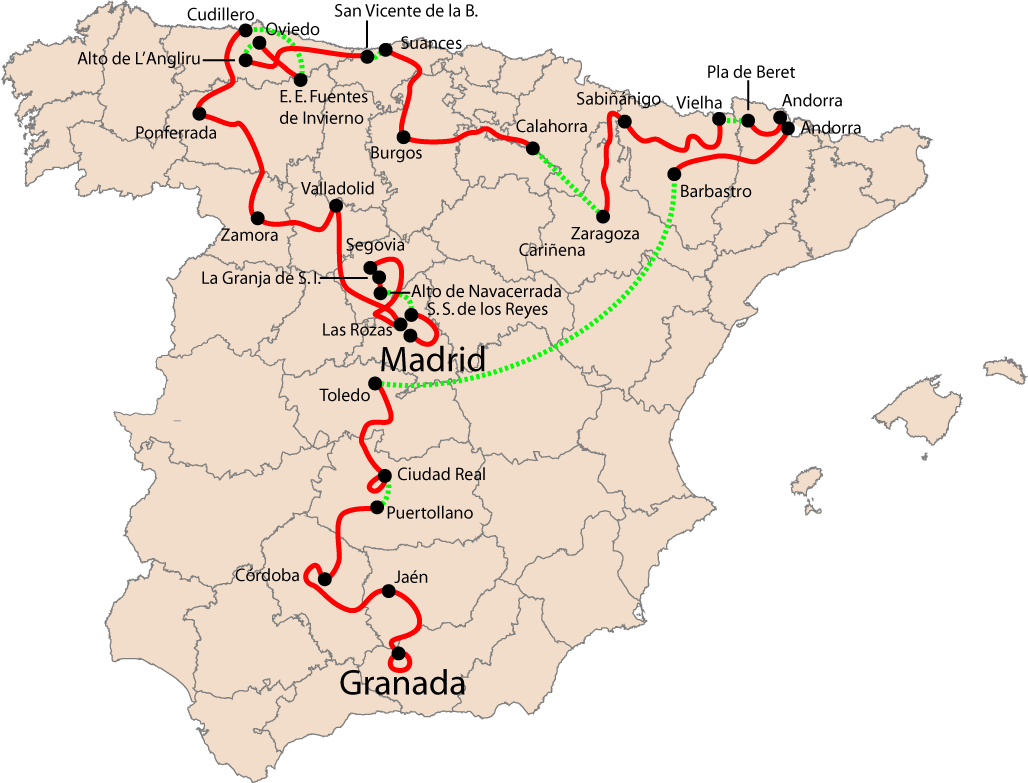
- Overview of the stages

Race details
- Dates: 30 August – 21 September
- Stages: 21
- Distance: 3,133.8 km (1,947 mi)
- Winning time: 80h 40' 23"

Results
Jersey awarded to the overall winner	Winner	Alberto Contador (ESP)	(Astana)
	Second	Levi Leipheimer (USA)	(Astana)
	Third	Carlos Sastre (ESP)	(CSC–Saxo Bank)
Jersey awarded to the points classification winner	Points	Greg Van Avermaet (BEL)	(Silence–Lotto)
Jersey awarded to the mountains classification winner	Mountains	David Moncoutié (FRA)	(Cofidis)
Jersey awarded to the combination classification winner	Combination	Alberto Contador (ESP)	(Astana)
	Team	Caisse d'Epargne	

The 2008 Vuelta a España was the 63rd edition of the Vuelta a España, one of cycling's Grand Tours. The race began with a 7 km (4.3 mi) team time trial on 30 August in Granada. The Vuelta came to a close twenty-three days later with a 102.2 km (63.5 mi) flat stage, which brought the peloton into the streets of Madrid. Nineteen teams entered the race, which was won by the Spaniard Alberto Contador of Astana. Second and third respectively were the American Levi Leipheimer of Astana and the Spanish Carlos Sastre of CSC–Saxo Bank.

Alberto Contador first gained the race lead after the race's thirteenth stage, which contained a summit finish on the Alto de El Angliru. Contador took the lead from Euskaltel–Euskadi's Egoi Martínez, who had held the race lead for four stages. Through the first nine days of racing the race leader's golden jersey had been worn by eight different riders. The day after Contador gained the lead of the race, he attacked again and won the stage, while also expanding his lead over his competitors. Contador lost about thirty seconds to his teammate Levi Leipheimer in the stage 20 individual time trial, but together he and Levi further distanced themselves from the other general classification contenders.

Contador's win at the Vuelta allowed him to become the first Spaniard – and the fifth person in the history of cycling – to win all three Grand Tours in a career. At the age of 25, Contador became the youngest person to ever win all three Grand Tours. Contador was also the third cyclist to ever win the Giro d'Italia and the Vuelta in the same calendar year. In addition to the general classification, Contador also won the combination classification. In the race's other classifications, Silence–Lotto's Greg Van Avermaet won the points classification and David Moncoutié of the Cofidis team won the mountains classification. Finally, Caisse d'Epargne won the team classification, which ranked each of the nineteen teams contesting the race by lowest cumulative time.

== Teams ==
A total of 19 teams were invited to participate in the 2008 Vuelta a España. Sixteen of the competing squads were UCI ProTour teams, while the other three teams were UCI Professional Continental teams. Each team sent a squad of nine riders, so the Vuelta began with a peloton of 171 cyclists. Out of the 171 riders that started this edition of the Vuelta, a total of 131 riders made it to the finish in Madrid. Team Columbia chose not participate in the race, as they withdrew their application to compete in the Vuelta in order to race the Tours of Ireland, Britain, and Missouri. While Scott–American Beef – formerly known as Saunier Duval–Scott – was excluded from the event as a result of the doping cases of Riccardo Riccò and Leonardo Piepoli in the 2008 Tour de France.

The 19 teams invited to the race were:

- Ag2r–La Mondiale
- Andalucía–CajaSur†
- Astana
- Bouygues Télécom
- Caisse d'Epargne
- Cofidis
- Crédit Agricole
- Euskaltel–Euskadi
- Française des Jeux
- Gerolsteiner
- Lampre
- Liquigas
- Team Milram
- Quick-Step
- Rabobank
- CSC–Saxo Bank
- Silence–Lotto
- Tinkoff Credit Systems†
- Xacobeo–Galicia†

†: Invited Pro-continental teams

== Route ==
This edition of the Vuelta contained three time trial events, two of which were individual and one a team event. Six stages were classified as mountain stages, while two stages were deemed intermediate stages. Ten of the stages were designated as flat stages, which meant that they were primarily flat but could contain a climb or two of a lesser category.

Stage	Date	Course	Distance	Type		Winner
1	30 August	Granada	7.7 km (5 mi)		Team time trial	Liquigas
2	31 August	Granada to Jaén	167.3 km (104 mi)	Plain stage	Flat stage	Alejandro Valverde (ESP)
3	1 September	Jaén to Córdoba	168.6 km (105 mi)	Plain stage	Flat stage	Tom Boonen (BEL)
4	2 September	Córdoba to Puertollano	170.3 km (106 mi)	Plain stage	Flat stage	Daniele Bennati (ITA)
5	3 September	Ciudad Real	42.5 km (26 mi)		Individual time trial	Levi Leipheimer (USA)
6	4 September	Ciudad Real to Toledo	150.1 km (93 mi)	Plain stage	Flat stage	Paolo Bettini (ITA)
	5 September	Rest day				
7	6 September	Barbastro to Naturlandia-La Rabassa (Andorra)	223.2 km (139 mi)	Mountain stage	Mountain stage	Alessandro Ballan (ITA)
8	7 September	Escaldes-Engordany (Andorra) to Plá de Beret	151 km (94 mi)	Mountain stage	Mountain stage	David Moncoutié (FRA)
9	8 September	Vielha e Mijaran to Sabiñánigo	200.8 km (125 mi)	Intermediate stage	Intermediate stage	Greg Van Avermaet (BEL)
10	9 September	Sabiñánigo to Zaragoza	151.3 km (94 mi)	Plain stage	Flat stage	Sébastien Hinault (FRA)
11	10 September	Calahorra to Burgos	178 km (111 mi)	Plain stage	Flat stage	Óscar Freire (ESP)
12	11 September	Burgos to Suances	186.4 km (116 mi)	Intermediate stage	Intermediate stage	Paolo Bettini (ITA)
	12 September	Rest day				
13	13 September	San Vicente de la Barquera to Alto de El Angliru	209.5 km (130 mi)	Mountain stage	Mountain stage	Alberto Contador (ESP)
14	14 September	Oviedo to Fuentes de Invierno	158.4 km (98 mi)	Mountain stage	Mountain stage	Alberto Contador (ESP)
15	15 September	Cudillero to Ponferrada	202 km (126 mi)	Mountain stage	Mountain stage	David García (ESP)
16	16 September	Ponferrada to Zamora	186.3 km (116 mi)	Plain stage	Flat stage	Tom Boonen (BEL)
17	17 September	Zamora to Valladolid	148.2 km (92 mi)	Plain stage	Flat stage	Wouter Weylandt (BEL)
18	18 September	Valladolid to Las Rozas	167.4 km (104 mi)	Plain stage	Flat stage	Imanol Erviti (ESP)
19	19 September	Las Rozas to Segovia	145.5 km (90 mi)	Mountain stage	Mountain stage	David Arroyo (ESP)
20	20 September	La Granja de San Ildefonso to Puerto de Navacerrada	17.1 km (11 mi)		Individual time trial	Levi Leipheimer (USA)
21	21 September	San Sebastián de los Reyes to Madrid	102.2 km (64 mi)	Plain stage	Flat stage	Matti Breschel (DEN)
	Total		3,133.8 km (1,947 mi)			

== Race overview ==
For details, see 2008 Vuelta a España, Stage 1 to Stage 11 and 2008 Vuelta a España, Stage 12 to Stage 21.

The 2008 Vuelta a España began with a short team time trial in Granada, a traditional city in the history of the Vuelta, having hosted a stage start or finish 39 previous times. Though Astana and Team CSC Saxo Bank were thought to be favorites to win this stage, the top team was Liquigas, which put their team leader Filippo Pozzato in the first golden jersey. This set the stage for an extremely turbulent first week in terms of race leadership, as Alejandro Valverde, Daniele Bennati, Levi Leipheimer, Sylvain Chavanel, and Alessandro Ballan would all don the maillot oro between the race's beginning and Stage 7. All but Chavanel did this by virtue of stage wins – Chavanel, for his part, had been 2 seconds behind Leipheimer for the race lead after the Vuelta's first individual time trial (ITT), and took it the next day thanks to time bonuses in intermediate sprints.

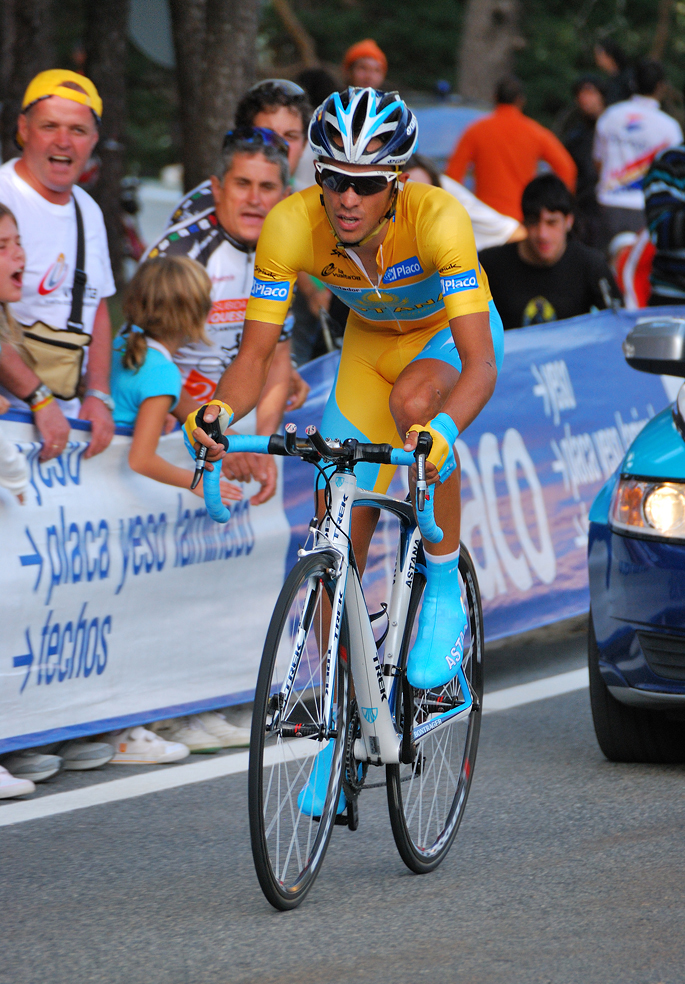
Alberto Contador wearing the golden jersey during the 20th stage (time trial).

After the first rest day came the Vuelta's longest stage, said to be the queen stage, as it had many high mountain climbs and an extremely difficult climb to the finish in Andorra. As it happened, the day the stage was run was marked by consistent rain and cold temperatures, making the stage harder still. Ballan won this stage from a breakaway and took the overall lead, but he was unable to remain in contention the next day. Leipheimer, who had been in second overall, re-assumed the overall lead. In Stage 9, Leipheimer's Astana team afforded a breakaway including Egoi Martínez sufficient time that Martínez took the overall lead, meaning that through nine stages the race lead had only been retained from one day to the next one time.

The next several stages were flat, and won by sprinters and breakaways, meaning Martínez was able to retain the overall lead for a time. Stage 13, which ended at the storied Alto de El Angliru, revealed the race's overall contenders. Alberto Contador won the stage and in so doing gained a lead over Leipheimer, Carlos Sastre, Ezequiel Mosquera, and Valverde which he would never relinquish. Contador padded this lead by winning the stage the next day, and kept it in the race's second and final ITT, where his strongest challenger was ironically his teammate Leipheimer.

The points classification was won by Belgian Silence–Lotto rider Greg Van Avermaet, who had won Stage 9 and finished in the top ten of nine other stages. The King of the Mountains went to Cofidis' David Moncoutié, also a stage winner. The summit stage finish won by Moncoutié as well as points gained by topping climbs at the head of the peloton in the Angliru stage proved to propel Moncoutié into the granate jersey. The combination classification, an award unique to the Vuelta among the Grand Tours, was won by Contador, as his first in the General Classification, second in the points classification, and third in the King of the Mountains Classification was by far the strongest combined showing by any rider. With the overall victory, Contador became the first Spaniard and fifth rider ever to complete the career sweep of the Grand Tours.

== Classification Leadership ==
In the 2008 Vuelta a España, four different jerseys were awarded. For the general classification, calculated by adding the finishing times of the stages per cyclist, the leader received a golden jersey. This classification is considered the most important of the Vuelta a España, and the winner of the general classification is considered the winner of the Vuelta.

Additionally, there was also a points classification, which awarded a blue jersey. In the points classification, cyclists received points for finishing in the top 15 in a stage. The winner got 25 points, second place 20, third 16, fourth 14, fifth 12, sixth 10, and one point per place less down the line, to a single point for fifteenth. In addition, some points could be won in intermediate sprints.

There was also a mountains classification, which awarded a granate jersey. In the mountains classifications, points were won by reaching the top of a mountain before other cyclists. Each climb was categorized, with most of the climbs being either first, second, third, or fourth category. There were also two "special category" climbs (equivalent to hors catégorie in the Tour de France), the stage finishes into Andorra and the Alto de El Angliru. "Special category" climbs paid 30 points for the first rider over the summit, then 25, 20, 16, 12, 10, 8, 6, 4, 3, 2 and 1. First category climbs paid 16 points for the leader, then 12, 10, 8, 6, 4, 3, 2 and 1, second category climbs 10, 7, 5, 3, 2 and 1, and third category climbs 6, 4, 2 and 1.

Finally, there was the combination classification. This was calculated by adding the rankings in the general, points and mountains classifications; the cyclist with the lowest combined ranking was the leader in the combination classification, and received a white jersey.

There was also a classification for teams. In this classification, the times of the best three cyclists per stage were added, and the team with the lowest time was leader.

The rows in the following table correspond to the jerseys awarded after that stage was run.

Classification leadership by stage
Stage	Winner	General classification	Points classification	Mountains classification	Combination classification	Team classification
1	Liquigas	Filippo Pozzato	not awarded	not awarded	not awarded	Liquigas
2	Alejandro Valverde	Alejandro Valverde	Alejandro Valverde	Jesús Rosendo	Egoi Martínez	Caisse d'Epargne
3	Tom Boonen	Daniele Bennati	Alejandro Valverde	Jesús Rosendo	Egoi Martínez	Caisse d'Epargne
4	Daniele Bennati	Daniele Bennati	Daniele Bennati	Jesús Rosendo	Paolo Bettini	Quick-Step
5	Levi Leipheimer	Levi Leipheimer	Daniele Bennati	Jesús Rosendo	Egoi Martínez	Astana
6	Paolo Bettini	Sylvain Chavanel	Daniele Bennati	Jesús Rosendo	Paolo Bettini	Astana
7	Alessandro Ballan	Alessandro Ballan	Daniele Bennati	Alessandro Ballan	Alessandro Ballan	Astana
8	David Moncoutié	Levi Leipheimer	Alejandro Valverde	Alessandro Ballan	Alberto Contador	Astana
9	Greg Van Avermaet	Egoi Martínez	Alejandro Valverde	David Moncoutié	Alberto Contador	Caisse d'Epargne
10	Sébastien Hinault	Egoi Martínez	Greg Van Avermaet	David Moncoutié	Alberto Contador	Caisse d'Epargne
11	Óscar Freire	Egoi Martínez	Greg Van Avermaet	David Moncoutié	Alberto Contador	Caisse d'Epargne
12	Paolo Bettini	Egoi Martínez	Greg Van Avermaet	David Moncoutié	Alberto Contador	Astana
13	Alberto Contador	Alberto Contador	Greg Van Avermaet	David Moncoutié	Alberto Contador	Caisse d'Epargne
14	Alberto Contador	Alberto Contador	Alberto Contador	David Moncoutié	Alberto Contador	Caisse d'Epargne
15	David García	Alberto Contador	Alberto Contador	David Moncoutié	Alberto Contador	Caisse d'Epargne
16	Tom Boonen	Alberto Contador	Alberto Contador	David Moncoutié	Alberto Contador	Caisse d'Epargne
17	Wouter Weylandt	Alberto Contador	Greg Van Avermaet	David Moncoutié	Alberto Contador	Caisse d'Epargne
18	Imanol Erviti	Alberto Contador	Greg Van Avermaet	David Moncoutié	Alberto Contador	Caisse d'Epargne
19	David Arroyo	Alberto Contador	Greg Van Avermaet	David Moncoutié	Alberto Contador	Caisse d'Epargne
20	Levi Leipheimer	Alberto Contador	Greg Van Avermaet	David Moncoutié	Alberto Contador	Caisse d'Epargne
21	Matti Breschel	Alberto Contador	Greg Van Avermaet	David Moncoutié	Alberto Contador	Caisse d'Epargne
Final		Alberto Contador	Greg Van Avermaet	David Moncoutié	Alberto Contador	Caisse d'Epargne

Jersey wearers when one rider is leading two or more competitions

If a cyclist leads two or more competitions at the end of a stage, he receives all those jerseys. In the next stage, he can only wear one jersey, and he wears the jersey representing leadership in the most important competition (golden first, then blue, then granate, then white). The other jerseys that the cyclists owns are worn in the next stage by the second-place (or, if needed, third or fourth-place) rider in that classification.

- In stage 3, Davide Rebellin, who was in second in the points classification, wore the blue jersey, because Alejandro Valverde (in first place) wore the golden jersey as leader of the general classification during that stage.
- In stage 5, Tom Boonen, who was in second in the points classification, wore the blue jersey, because Daniele Bennati (in first place) wore the golden jersey as leader of the general classification during that stage.
- In stage 8, Marc de Maar, who was in second in the mountains classification, wore the granate jersey, because Alessandro Ballan (in first place) wore the golden jersey as leader of the general classification during that stage.
- In stages 8, Levi Leipheimer, who was in second in the combination classification, wore the white jersey, because Alessandro Ballan (in first place) wore the golden jersey as leader of the general classification during that stage.
- In stages 14 through 21, Levi Leipheimer, who was in second in the combination classification, wore the white jersey, because Alberto Contador (in first place) wore the golden jersey as leader of the general classification during those stages.
- In stages 15 and 16, Greg Van Avermaet, who was in second in the points classification, wore the blue jersey, because Alberto Contador (in first place) wore the golden jersey as leader of the general classification during those stages.
- In stage 17, Tom Boonen, who was in second in the points classification, wore the blue jersey, because Alberto Contador (in first place) wore the golden jersey as leader of the general classification during that stage.

== Final standings ==
Legend
A pink jersey	Denotes the winner of the General classification	A green jersey	Denotes the winner of the Mountains classification
A granate jersey	Denotes the winner of the Points classification	A white jersey	Denotes the winner of the Combination classification

=== General classification ===
Final general classification (1–10)
	Rider	Team	Time
1	Alberto Contador (ESP)	Astana	80h 40' 08"
2	Levi Leipheimer (USA)	Astana	+ 46"
3	Carlos Sastre (ESP)	CSC–Saxo Bank	+ 4' 12"
4	Ezequiel Mosquera (ESP)	Xacobeo–Galicia	+ 5' 19"
5	Alejandro Valverde (ESP)	Caisse d'Epargne	+ 6' 00"
6	Joaquim Rodríguez (ESP)	Caisse d'Epargne	+ 6' 50"
7	Robert Gesink (NED)	Rabobank	+ 6' 55"
8	David Moncoutié (FRA)	Cofidis	+ 10' 10"
9	Egoi Martínez (ESP)	Euskaltel–Euskadi	+ 10' 57"
10	Marzio Bruseghin (ITA)	Lampre	+ 11' 56"

=== Points classification ===
	Rider	Team	Points
1	Greg Van Avermaet (BEL)	Silence–Lotto	158
2	Alberto Contador (ESP)	Astana	137
3	Alejandro Valverde (ESP)	Caisse d'Epargne	129
4	Levi Leipheimer (USA)	Astana	116
5	Koldo Fernández (ESP)	Euskaltel–Euskadi	88
6	Matti Breschel (DEN)	CSC–Saxo Bank	69
7	Joaquim Rodríguez (ESP)	Caisse d'Epargne	69
8	Sébastien Hinault (FRA)	Crédit Agricole	68
9	Ezequiel Mosquera (ESP)	Xacobeo–Galicia	67
10	David Moncoutié (FRA)	Cofidis	65

=== King of the Mountains classification ===
	Rider	Team	Points
1	David Moncoutié (FRA)	Cofidis	149
2	Christophe Kern (FRA)	Crédit Agricole	106
3	Alberto Contador (ESP)	Astana	99
4	Juan Manuel Gárate (ESP)	Quick-Step	89
5	Levi Leipheimer (USA)	Astana	65
6	Ezequiel Mosquera (ESP)	Xacobeo–Galicia	56
7	Joaquim Rodríguez (ESP)	Caisse d'Epargne	51
8	Alejandro Valverde (ESP)	Caisse d'Epargne	48
9	Iñigo Landaluze (ESP)	Euskaltel–Euskadi	46
10	Maarten Tjallingii (NED)	Silence–Lotto	43

=== Combination classification ===
	Rider	Team	Points
1	Alberto Contador (ESP)	Astana	6
2	Levi Leipheimer (USA)	Astana	11
3	Alejandro Valverde (ESP)	Caisse d'Epargne	16
4	Ezequiel Mosquera (ESP)	Xacobeo–Galicia	19
5	David Moncoutié (FRA)	Cofidis	19
6	Joaquim Rodríguez (ESP)	Caisse d'Epargne	20
7	Carlos Sastre (ESP)	CSC–Saxo Bank	26
8	Robert Gesink (NED)	Rabobank	41
9	David Arroyo (ESP)	Caisse d'Epargne	50
10	Juan Manuel Gárate (ESP)	Quick-Step	58

=== Teams classification ===
	Team	Time
1	Caisse d'Epargne	241h 20' 38"
2	Euskaltel–Euskadi	+ 39' 22"
3	CSC–Saxo Bank	+ 39' 35"
4	Astana	+ 42' 01"
5	Xacobeo–Galicia	+ 51' 31"
6	Lampre	+ 1h 14' 51"
7	Rabobank	+ 1h 17' 22"
8	Ag2r–La Mondiale	+ 1h 27' 42"
9	Crédit Agricole	+ 1h 28' 56"
10	Silence–Lotto	+ 1h 42' 42"
