= Egoi Martínez =

Spanish cyclist

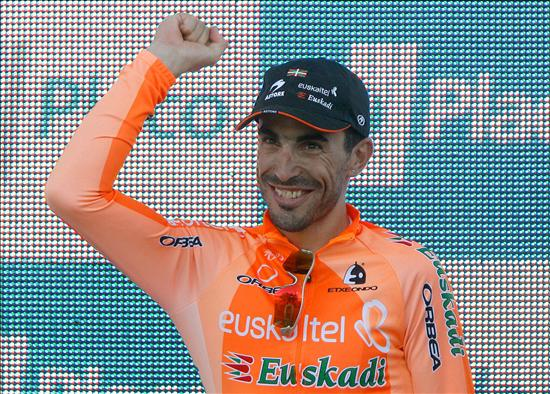
- Martínez at the 2008 Vuelta a España.

Personal information
- Full name: Egoi Martínez de Esteban
- Born: 15 May 1978 (age 48) Etxarri-Aranatz, Spain
- Height: 1.83 m (6 ft 0 in)
- Weight: 71 kg (157 lb)

Cycling career
- Sport: Cycling
- Current team: Retired
- Discipline: Road
- Role: Rider

Amateur team
- 1999–2000: Caja Rural

Professional teams
- 2001–2005: Euskaltel–Euskadi
- 2006–2007: Discovery Channel
- 2008–2013: Euskaltel–Euskadi

Major wins
- Grand Tours Tour de France Mountains classification (2009) Vuelta a España Mountains classification (2006) 1 individual stage (2006)

Egoi Martínez de Esteban (born 15 May 1978 in Etxarri-Aranatz, Navarre) is a Spanish former professional road bicycle racer, who competed as a professional between 2001 and 2013. In his first Tour de France, Martínez finished 41st overall at the 2004 Tour de France.

Martínez retired at the end of the 2013 season.

== Career achievements ==
=== Major results ===
2001
1st Overall Vuelta Ciclista a León
2nd Overall Vuelta a Navarra
2002
10th Overall Tour de l'Avenir
2003
1st Overall Tour de l'Avenir
2004
4th Overall Tour du Gévaudan Languedoc-Roussillon
2005
4th GP Miguel Induráin
2006
Vuelta a España

1st Mountains classification
1st Stage 11

4th Overall Vuelta a Castilla y León
Combativity Award Stage 4 Tour de France
2008
1st Mountains classification, Tour of the Basque Country
9th Overall Vuelta a España

Held after Stages 9–12
Held after Stages 2–3 & 5

10th Klasika Primavera
Combativity Award Stage 15 Tour de France
2009
1st Mountains classification, Tour de France
1st Mountains classification, Tirreno–Adriatico
1st Sprints classification, Tour of the Basque Country
2nd Klasika Primavera
2010
1st Mountains classification, Criterium du Dauphiné
9th Klasika Primavera

=== Grand Tour general classification results timeline ===
Grand Tour	2004	2005	2006	2007	2008	2009	2010	2011	2012	2013
Giro d'Italia	—	—	—	—	—	—	—	—	—	22
Tour de France	41	48	41	61	50	44	39	33	17	—
/ Vuelta a España	—	45	12	DNF	9	52	DNF	55	—	30

Legend
—	Did not compete
DNF	Did not finish
