= Sébastien Hinault =

French cyclist

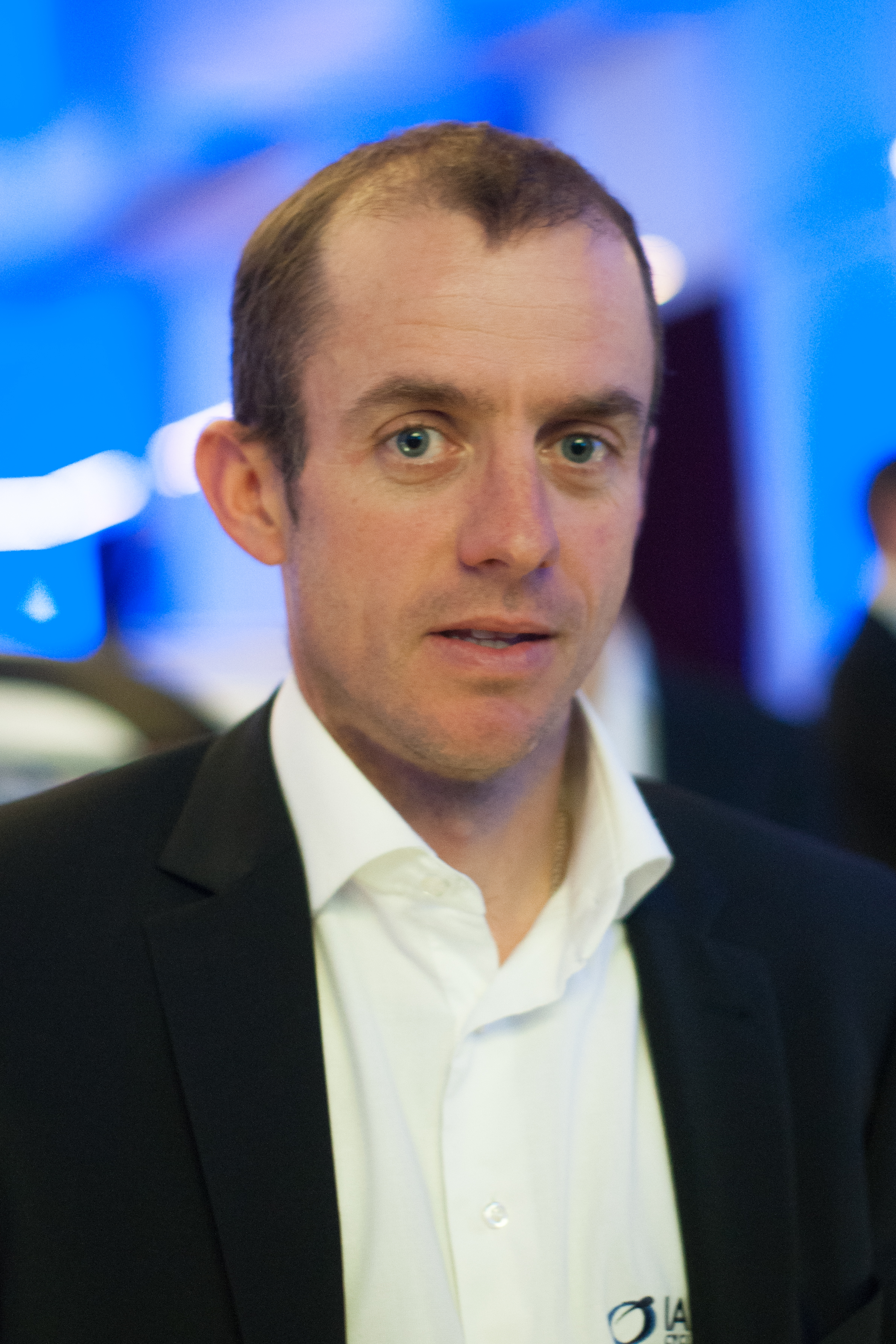
- Hinault in 2014

Personal information
- Full name: Sébastien Hinault
- Born: 11 February 1974 (age 52) Saint-Brieuc, France

Cycling career
- Sport: Cycling
- Current team: Arkéa–B&B Hotels
- Discipline: Road
- Role: Rider (retired); Directeur sportif

Professional teams
- 1997–2008: GAN
- 2009–2012: Ag2r–La Mondiale
- 2013–2014: IAM Cycling

Managerial team
- 2015–: Bretagne–Séché Environnement

Major wins
- Grand Tours Vuelta a España 1 individual stage (2008) One-day races and Classics Boucles de l'Aulne (2012)

Sébastien Hinault (born 11 February 1974) is a French former professional road racing cyclist, who competed professionally between 1997 and 2014, competing in seventeen Grand Tours. He now works as a directeur sportif for UCI ProTeam Arkéa–B&B Hotels.

== Career ==
Born in Saint-Brieuc, Hinault debuted in 1997 with the French team GAN, which later became Crédit Agricole, and has competed in the Tour de France five times. After Crédit Agricole disbanded in 2008, Hinault joined Ag2r–La Mondiale. Hinault left Ag2r–La Mondiale at the end of the 2012 season, and joined the new IAM Cycling team for the 2013 season. Hinault retired from competition at the end of the 2014 season and in October 2014 was announced as a directeur sportif for the Bretagne–Séché Environnement team for 2015.

Although they share the same birthplace and surname, he is not related to former champion cyclist Bernard Hinault.

== Major results ==
1999
4th Tro-Bro Léon
8th Grand Prix de Denain
9th Overall Tour du Limousin
2000
1st Tour du Finistère
4th Trofeo Pantalica
6th Overall Tour du Limousin
6th Grand Prix d'Ouverture La Marseillaise
6th Tour de Vendée
7th Cholet-Pays de Loire
7th À Travers le Morbihan
10th Paris–Camembert
2001
1st Stage 5 (TTT) Tour de France
2002
3rd Tro-Bro Léon
10th Tour du Finistère
2003
1st Stage 4 Tour de Pologne
2nd Grand Prix de la Ville de Lillers
3rd Classic Loire Atlantique
6th Grand Prix de Rennes
8th Classic Haribo
10th Cholet-Pays de Loire
2004
1st Stage 4 Deutschland Tour
3rd Classic Haribo
3rd Tour de Vendée
2005
3rd Overall Circuit Franco-Belge

1st Stage 2

5th Grand Prix de Villers-Cotterêts
9th Tro-Bro Léon
2006
1st Stage 8 Tour de Langkawi
1st Stage 4 Tour de Picardie
1st Stage 4 Tour du Limousin
3rd Tour de Vendée
4th Overall Four Days of Dunkirk
10th Brabantse Pijl
2007
1st Stage 3 La Tropicale Amissa Bongo
4th Boucles de l'Aulne
9th Grand Prix d'Isbergues
2008
1st Overall Tour du Limousin

1st Stage 3

1st Stage 10 Vuelta a España
2009
4th Overall Tour du Limousin
6th Paris–Bourges
2010
9th Overall Paris–Roubaix
9th Overall Vattenfall Cyclassics
2011
8th E3 Prijs Vlaanderen
2012
1st Boucles de l'Aulne
3rd Tour de Vendée
4th Overall Circuit de Lorraine

1st Stage 3

2013
7th Overall Four Days of Dunkirk
9th Tour du Jura

=== Grand Tour general classification results timeline ===
Grand Tour	1999	2000	2001	2002	2003	2004	2005	2006	2007	2008	2009	2010	2011	2012	2013	2014
Giro d'Italia	—	—	—	—	—	—	—	—	—	—	135	100	—	—	—	—
Tour de France	123	125	137	147	138	DNF	115	113	132	—	—	—	111	122	—	—
Vuelta a España	—	—	—	—	—	—	—	—	—	64	69	117	—	—	—	106

Legend
—	Did not compete
DNF	Did not finish
