= David Arroyo =

Spanish road bicycle racer (born 1980)

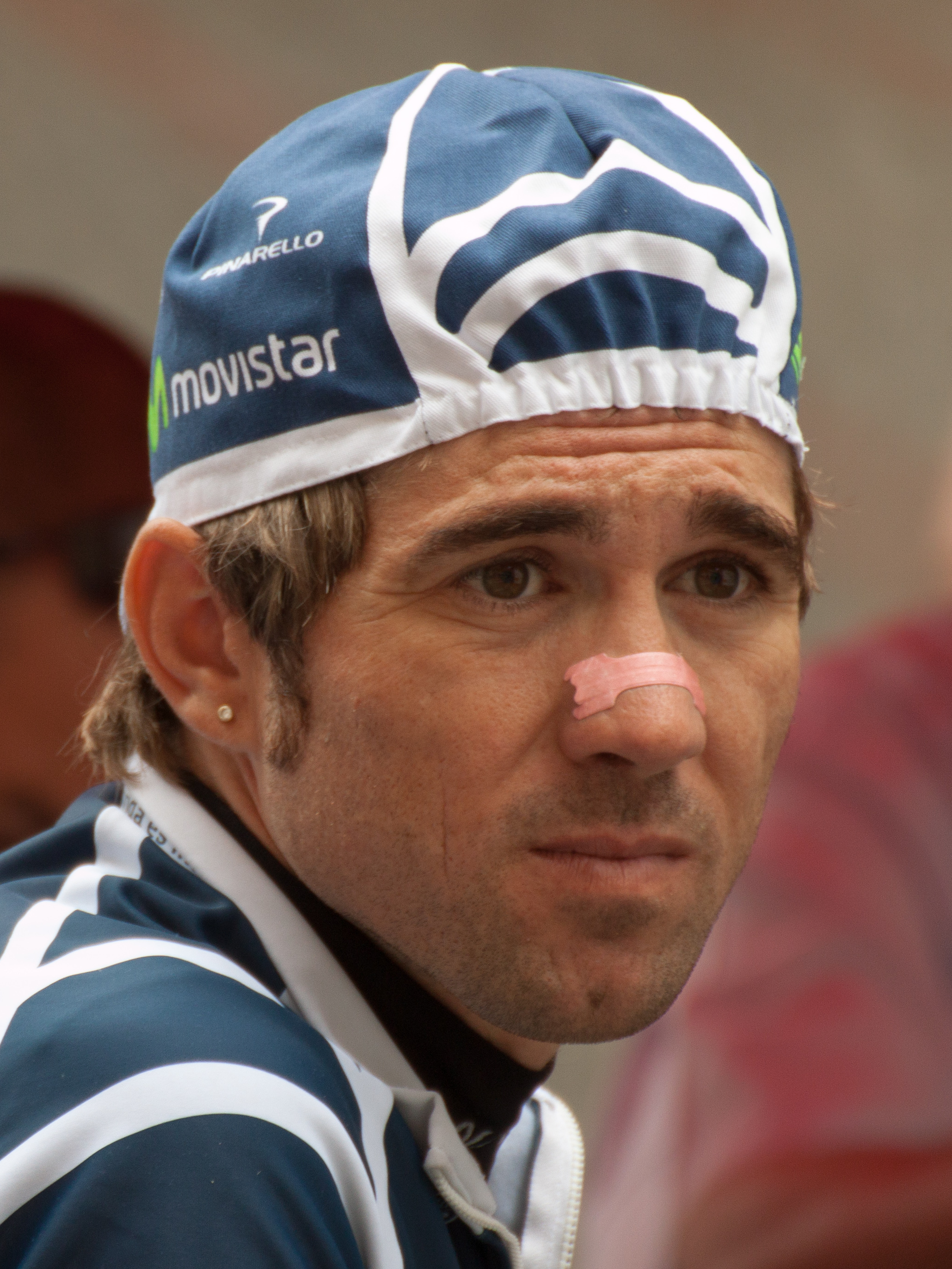
- Arroyo at the 2012 Critérium du Dauphiné

Personal information
- Full name: David Arroyo Durán
- Born: 7 January 1980 (age 46) Talavera de la Reina, Spain
- Height: 1.70 m (5 ft 7 in)
- Weight: 60 kg (132 lb)

Cycling career
- Sport: Cycling
- Current team: Primaflor–Mondraker–XSauce
- Disciplines: Road (retired); Mountain biking
- Role: Rider
- Rider type: All-rounder

Professional teams
- 2001–2003: ONCE–Eroski
- 2004: LA Alumínios–Pecol
- 2005–2012: Illes Balears–Banesto
- 2013–2017: Caja Rural
- 2018: Efapel
- 2019–: Primaflor–Mondraker–Rotor (MTB)

Major wins
- Grand Tours Vuelta a España 1 individual stage (2008)

David Arroyo Durán (born 7 January 1980) is a Spanish cyclist, who currently competes in mountain biking for the Primaflor–Mondraker–XSauce team. He is also a former professional road bicycle racer, who rode between 2001 and 2018 for the ONCE–Eroski, LA Alumínios–Pecol, Movistar Team, Caja Rural–Seguros RGA and Efapel teams.

== Career ==
Arroyo was born in Talavera de la Reina, Province of Toledo.

=== Illes Balears–Banesto, later Movistar Team (2005–2012) ===
He was also one of the best climbers on the Movistar Team, Arroyo's team from 2005 to 2012, along with the team leader Alejandro Valverde. After Valverde crashed in the first week of the 2006 Tour de France, Arroyo was made team leader, until Óscar Pereiro claimed the leader's yellow jersey. Arroyo then helped to protect Pereiro in the mountain climbs and ensure his overall victory.

Arroyo's biggest win to that point was Stage 19 of the 2008 Vuelta a España. Prior to that, his only victories came at the 2004 Volta a Portugal, where he won two stages, the mountains classification and the young rider classification.

In the 2010 Giro d'Italia, Arroyo wore the pink jersey as race leader for five days. He was part of a fortunate breakaway in stage 11 of that race that took over 13 minutes from the race's overall favourites, and claimed the jersey three days later on a mountain stage. He kept it through two mountain stages and the climbing time trial to Kronplatz, but lost it to eventual Giro champion Ivan Basso in stage 19. He finished the race second overall, in the process proving himself to be one of the best descenders in the peloton.

== Major results ==
2000
1st Road race, National Under-23 Road Championships
2003
1st Stage 1 (TTT) Volta a Catalunya
2004
2nd Overall Volta a Portugal

1st Mountains classification
1st Young rider classification
1st Stages 4 & 8

5th Subida al Naranco
8th Overall Vuelta a Asturias
10th Overall Vuelta a Castilla y León
2006
5th Klasika Primavera
9th Clásica a los Puertos de Guadarrama
10th Overall Volta a Catalunya
2007
10th Overall Giro d'Italia
2008
1st Subida a Urkiola
1st Stage 19 Vuelta a España
2009
2nd Overall Tour du Limousin

1st Stage 3

4th Subida a Urkiola
5th Vuelta a La Rioja
6th Subida al Naranco
8th Overall Giro d'Italia
2010
2nd Overall Giro d'Italia

Held after Stages 14–18

5th Vuelta a La Rioja
2011
1st Stage 3 (TTT) Vuelta a Burgos
2013
2nd Overall Vuelta a Burgos
3rd Prueba Villafranca de Ordizia
2014
8th Overall Route du Sud
8th Vuelta a Murcia
9th GP Miguel Induráin
10th Overall Vuelta a Castilla y León
10th Overall Vuelta a Burgos
2015
9th Overall Vuelta a la Comunidad de Madrid
2016
2nd Overall Tour of Turkey
4th Overall Vuelta a Castilla y León
8th Overall Vuelta a la Comunidad de Madrid
2017
5th Overall Route du Sud

=== Grand Tour general classification results timeline ===
Grand Tour	2005	2006	2007	2008	2009	2010	2011	2012	2013	2014	2015	2016	2017
Giro d'Italia	—	—	10	—	8	2	13	—	—	—	—	—	—
Tour de France	53	19	12	29	66	—	34	—	—	—	—	—	—
Vuelta a España	—	19	—	17	—	24	—	—	13	20	12	122	89
