= Koldo Fernández =

Spanish cyclist

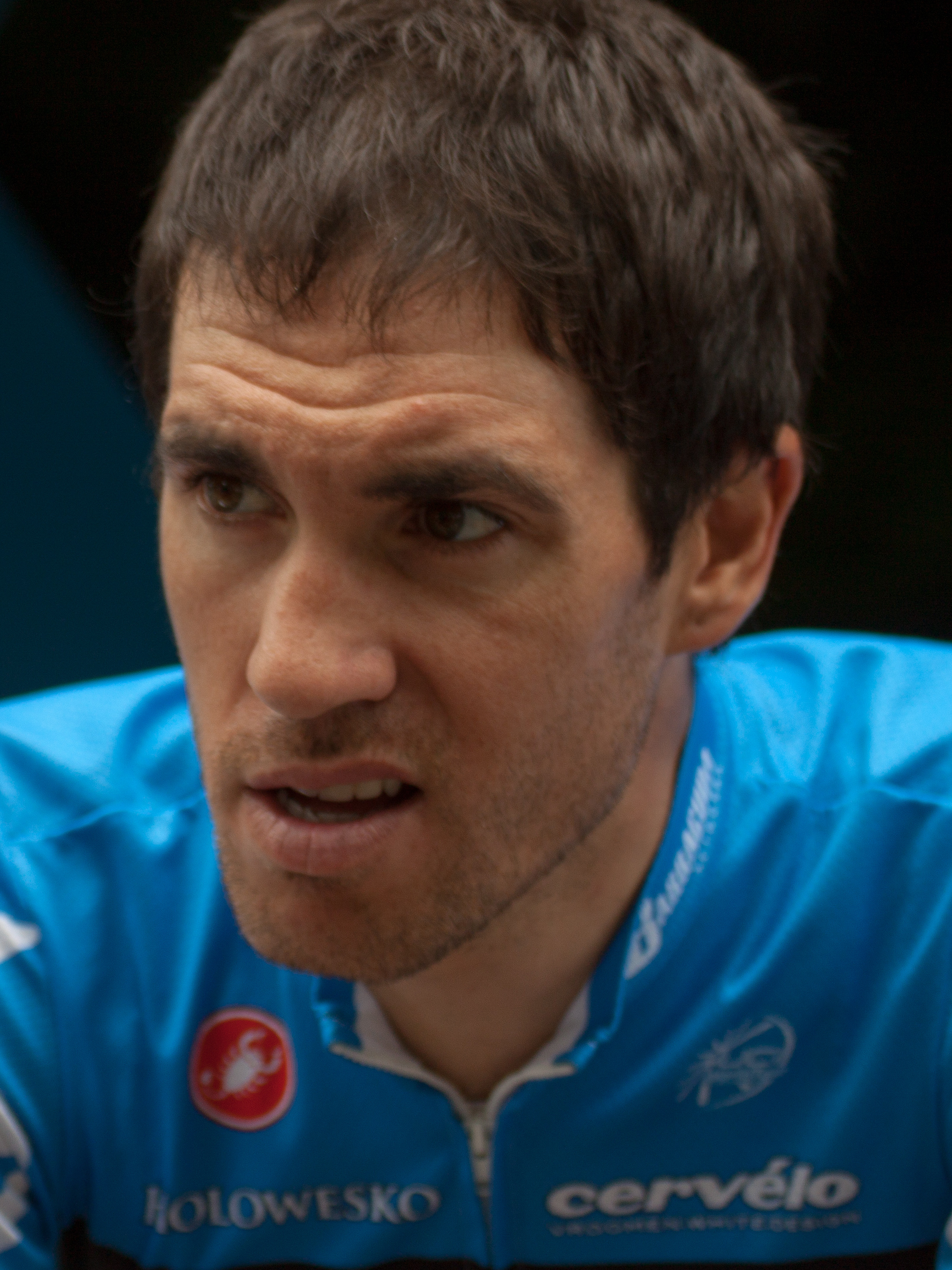
- Fernández at the 2012 Critérium du Dauphiné

Personal information
- Full name: Koldo Fernández de Larrea
- Born: 13 September 1981 (age 45) Vitoria-Gasteiz, Basque Country, Spain
- Height: 1.82 m (6 ft 0 in)
- Weight: 71 kg (157 lb)

Cycling career
- Sport: Cycling
- Current team: Retired
- Discipline: Road
- Role: Rider
- Rider type: Sprinter

Amateur team
- 2000–2001: Saunier Duval–Mapei

Professional teams
- 2004–2011: Euskaltel–Euskadi
- 2012–2014: Garmin–Barracuda

Major wins
- Circuito de Getxo (2009); Tour de Vendée (2010)

Koldo Fernández de Larrea (born 13 September 1981) is a Spanish former professional road racing cyclist, who rode professionally between 2004 and 2014 for the Euskaltel–Euskadi and Garmin–Sharp teams. He now works as a transfer agent within the sport.

Born in Vitoria-Gasteiz, Basque Country, Fernández currently resides in Zurbano, Basque Country, Spain.

== Major results ==
1999
1st Road race, National Junior Road Championships
2006
5th Trofeo Mallorca
10th Grand Prix Pino Cerami
2007
1st Stage 7 Tirreno–Adriatico
Vuelta a Mallorca

4th Trofeo Mallorca
6th Trofeo Calvia

5th Overall Vuelta a Andalucía
2008
1st Tour de Vendée
Vuelta a Murcia

1st Points classification
1st Stage 5

1st Stage 5 Vuelta a Castilla y León
1st Stage 2 Euskal Bizikleta
1st Stage 3 Vuelta a Burgos
2nd Circuito de Getxo
4th Clásica de Almería
4th Gran Premio de Llodio
2009
1st Circuito de Getxo
1st Stage 1 Vuelta a Burgos
1st Stage 2 Volta ao Algarve
5th Trofeo Cala Millor
5th Vattenfall Cyclassics
6th Gent–Wevelgem
2010
1st Tour de Vendée
1st Stage 1 Vuelta a Burgos
2nd Overall Tour de Picardie
Vuelta a Mallorca

2nd Trofeo Palma de Mallorca
2nd Trofeo Magaluf-Palmanova
5th Trofeo Cala Millor

3rd Road race, National Road Championships
9th Circuito de Getxo
2011
2nd Road race, National Road Championships
8th Trofeo Magaluf-Palmanova
2012
2nd Road race, National Road Championships

=== Grand Tour general classification results timeline ===
Grand Tour	2006	2007	2008	2009	2010	2011	2012	2013	2014
Giro d'Italia	DNF	135	DNF	—	—	—	—	—	DNF
Tour de France	—	—	—	DSQ	—	—	—	—	—
Vuelta a España	—	134	94	—	139	—	134	DNF	86

Legend
—	Did not compete
DNF	Did not finish
