= Jesús Rosendo =

Spanish cyclist

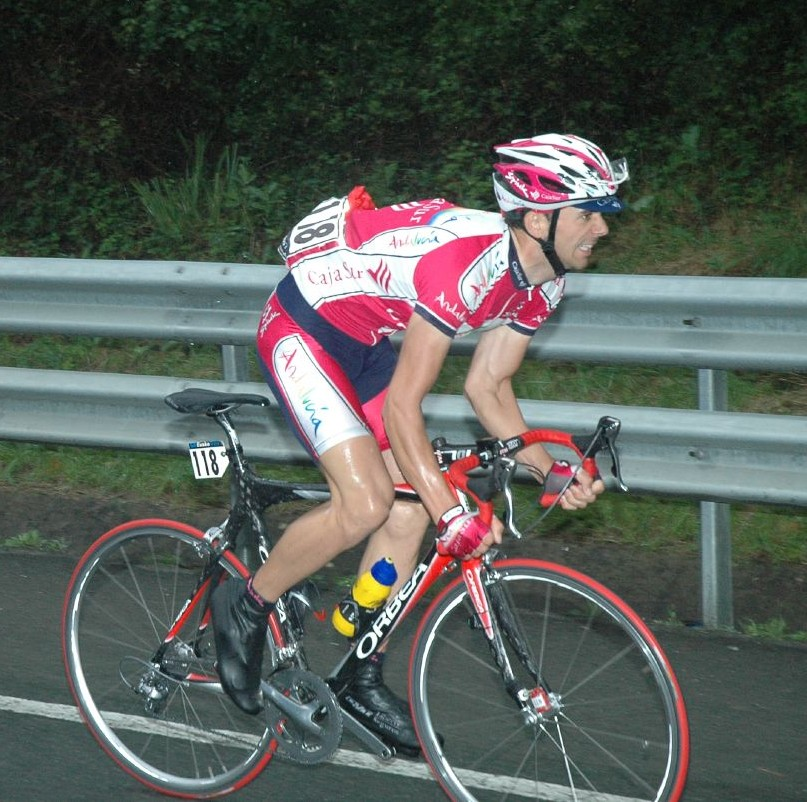

Personal information
- Full name: Jesús Rosendo Prado
- Born: 16 March 1982 (age 44) Seville, Spain

Cycling career
- Sport: Cycling
- Current team: Andalucía
- Discipline: Road
- Role: Rider

Professional team
- 2007–: Andalucía–Cajasur

Jesús Rosendo Prado (born 16 March 1982 in Seville) is a Spanish professional road bicycle racer for UCI Professional Continental team Andalucía. He has not yet won any races, but was the first leader of the King of the Mountains classification of the 2008 Vuelta a España, as the race began in his home province of Andalusia.

On 4 May 2010 Prado's name was released as being one of several riders under investigation by the UCI for "irregular blood values". The rider was suspended by his team Andalucía–Cajasur who released a statement saying that the haemoglobin and haematocrit levels appeared low, due to anaemia as a result of bleeding that the rider had suffered in April 2009 due to haemorrhoids. In 2011 due to a strong ride in a breakaway in Stage 2 of the Vuelta Rosendo wore the white jersey for best combined rider for one day after losing it to Pablo Lastras.

== Palmarès ==
2008 – Andalucía–Cajasur

- Leader Mountain Classification after stages 2,3,4,5 and 6, Vuelta a España

2011 – Andalucía–Caja Granada

Wore White Jersey best Combined rider in Stage 3 of the Vuelta
