= List of teams and cyclists in the 2009 Vuelta a España =

The list of teams and cyclists in the 2009 Vuelta a España contains the professional road bicycle racers who will compete at the 2009 Vuelta a España from 29 August–20 September 2009.

== Teams ==
Of the 18 UCI ProTour teams, only Team Katusha was not invited. Fuji–Servetto was not invited at first, but they appealed their disinvitation to the Court of Arbitration for Sport and were subsequently granted a place in the race. Additionally, UCI Professional Continental teams Andalucía–Cajasur, Cervélo TestTeam, Contentpolis–Ampo, Vacansoleil, and Xacobeo–Galicia were invited, making for a total of 22 teams in the race. Each team enters 9 riders, so the race begins with a total of 198.

Start list as at beginning of the race.

Euskaltel–Euskadi EUS
| No. | Rider | Pos. |
| 1 | Samuel Sánchez (ESP) | 2 |
| 2 | Igor Antón (ESP) | 33 |
| 3 | Aitor Hernández (ESP) | 96 |
| 4 | Iñaki Isasi (ESP) | 71 |
| 5 | Markel Irizar (ESP) | 114 |
| 6 | Egoi Martínez (ESP) | 52 |
| 7 | Alan Pérez (ESP) | 92 |
| 8 | Rubén Pérez (ESP) | 98 |
| 9 | Amets Txurruka (ESP) | 29 |

Ag2r–La Mondiale ALM
| No. | Rider | Pos. |
| 11 | Tadej Valjavec (SLO) | 30 |
| 12 | José Luis Arrieta (ESP) | 81 |
| 13 | Alexander Efimkin (RUS) | DNF-17 |
| 14 | John Gadret (FRA) | DNF-11 |
| 15 | Sébastien Hinault (FRA) | 69 |
| 16 | Julien Loubet (FRA) | DNF-18 |
| 17 | Rinaldo Nocentini (ITA) | DNF-13 |
| 18 | Christophe Riblon (FRA) | 46 |
| 19 | Ludovic Turpin (FRA) | 64 |

Andalucía–Cajasur ACA
| No. | Rider | Pos. |
| 21 | Xavier Tondó (ESP) | DNS-14 |
| 22 | Manuel Calvente (ESP) | 47 |
| 23 | José Antonio López (ESP) | DNF-10 |
| 24 | Francisco José Martínez (ESP) | 75 |
| 25 | Manuel Ortega (ESP) | DNF-6 |
| 26 | Antonio Piedra (ESP) | 78 |
| 27 | Javier Ramírez (ESP) | 62 |
| 28 | Jesús Rosendo (ESP) | 106 |
| 29 | José Ruíz (ESP) | 118 |

Astana AST
| No. | Rider | Pos. |
| 31 | Haimar Zubeldia (ESP) | 14 |
| 32 | Assan Bazayev (KAZ) | 130 |
| 33 | Jesús Hernández (ESP) | 19 |
| 34 | Chris Horner (USA) | DNS-5 |
| 35 | Maxim Iglinsky (KAZ) | DNS-18 |
| 36 | Daniel Navarro (ESP) | 13 |
| 37 | José Luis Rubiera (ESP) | DNF-12 |
| 38 | Michael Schär (SUI) | 110 |
| 39 | Alexander Vinokourov (KAZ) | DNF-12 |

Bbox Bouygues Telecom BBO
| No. | Rider | Pos. |
| 41 | Pierrick Fédrigo (FRA) | DNF-12 |
| 42 | Giovanni Bernaudeau (FRA) | DNF-8 |
| 43 | Olivier Bonnaire (FRA) | 48 |
| 44 | William Bonnet (FRA) | 109 |
| 45 | Franck Bouyer (FRA) | DNF-13 |
| 46 | Damien Gaudin (FRA) | 139 |
| 47 | Vincent Jérôme (FRA) | DNF-8 |
| 48 | Laurent Lefèvre (FRA) | DNF-9 |
| 49 | Matthieu Sprick (FRA) | 57 |

Caisse d'Epargne GCE
| No. | Rider | Pos. |
| 51 | (Spain) Alejandro Valverde | 1 |
| 52 | Imanol Erviti (ESP) | 100 |
| 53 | José Vicente García (ESP) | 137 |
| 54 | Vasil Kiryienka (BLR) | 16 |
| 55 | Daniel Moreno (ESP) | 11 |
| 56 | David López (ESP) | 42 |
| 57 | Francisco Pérez (ESP) | 88 |
| 58 | Joaquim Rodríguez (ESP) | 7 |
| 59 | Xabier Zandio (ESP) | 112 |

Cervélo TestTeam CTT
| No. | Rider | Pos. |
| 61 | Íñigo Cuesta (ESP) | 35 |
| 62 | Philip Deignan (IRL) | 9 |
| 63 | Xavier Florencio (ESP) | 59 |
| 64 | Simon Gerrans (AUS) | DNF-13 |
| 65 | José Ángel Gómez Marchante (ESP) | 22 |
| 66 | Roger Hammond (GBR) | 97 |
| 67 | Ignatas Konovalovas (LTU) | DNS-14 |
| 68 | Gabriel Rasch (NOR) | 101 |
| 69 | Dominique Rollin (CAN) | DNF-13 |

Cofidis COF
| No. | Rider | Pos. |
| 71 | David Moncoutié (FRA) | 27 |
| 72 | Mickaël Buffaz (FRA) | 89 |
| 73 | Jean Eudes Demaret (FRA) | 127 |
| 74 | Leonardo Duque (COL) | 32 |
| 75 | Julien El Fares (FRA) | 49 |
| 76 | Bingen Fernández (ESP) | 58 |
| 77 | Amaël Moinard (FRA) | 18 |
| 78 | Damien Monier (FRA) | 65 |
| 79 | Rein Taaramäe (EST) | 74 |

Contentpolis–Ampo CNM
| No. | Rider | Pos. |
| 81 | Julián Sánchez (ESP) | 79 |
| 82 | Javier Benítez (ESP) | 116 |
| 83 | Sergio Domínguez (ESP) | DNF-19 |
| 84 | Óscar García (ESP) | DNF-6 |
| 85 | Mikel Gaztañaga (ESP) | DNF-9 |
| 86 | Francisco José Pacheco (ESP) | 121 |
| 87 | Adrián Palomares (ESP) | 45 |
| 88 | Aitor Pérez (ESP) | 111 |
| 89 | Manuel Vázquez (ESP) | 15 |

Française des Jeux FDJ
| No. | Rider | Pos. |
| 91 | Sandy Casar (FRA) | DNF-14 |
| 92 | Sébastien Chavanel (FRA) | DNF-13 |
| 93 | Mikaël Cherel (FRA) | 25 |
| 94 | Rémy Di Gregorio (FRA) | 51 |
| 95 | Arnaud Gérard (FRA) | 105 |
| 96 | Timothy Gudsell (NZL) | 136 |
| 97 | Mathieu Ladagnous (FRA) | 63 |
| 98 | Anthony Roux (FRA) | 120 |
| 99 | Wesley Sulzberger (AUS) | 117 |

Fuji–Servetto FUJ
| No. | Rider | Pos. |
| 101 | Juan José Cobo (ESP) | 10 |
| 102 | Eros Capecchi (ITA) | DNF-13 |
| 103 | David de la Fuente (ESP) | 24 |
| 104 | Jesús Del Nero (ESP) | 66 |
| 105 | Arkaitz Durán (ESP) | 40 |
| 106 | Beñat Intxausti (ESP) | 60 |
| 107 | Fredrik Kessiakoff (SWE) | 72 |
| 108 | Robert Kišerlovski (CRO) | DNS-5 |
| 109 | Davide Viganò (ITA) | DNF-13 |

Garmin–Slipstream GRM
| No. | Rider | Pos. |
| 111 | Tom Danielson (USA) | DNF-18 |
| 112 | Julian Dean (NZL) | 132 |
| 113 | Tyler Farrar (USA) | DNS-12 |
| 114 | Ryder Hesjedal (CAN) | DNS-18 |
| 115 | Martijn Maaskant (NED) | 135 |
| 116 | Dan Martin (IRL) | 53 |
| 117 | Christian Meier (CAN) | DNS-18 |
| 118 | David Millar (GBR) | 80 |
| 119 | Svein Tuft (CAN) | DNF-15 |

Lampre–NGC LAM
| No. | Rider | Pos. |
| 121 | Damiano Cunego (ITA) | DNS-17 |
| 122 | Alessandro Ballan (ITA) | DNS-17 |
| 123 | Emanuele Bindi (ITA) | 128 |
| 124 | Vitaliy Buts (UKR) | DNS-12 |
| 125 | Enrico Gasparotto (ITA) | 82 |
| 126 | Marco Marzano (ITA) | DNF-14 |
| 127 | Massimiliano Mori (ITA) | 133 |
| 128 | Paolo Tiralongo (ITA) | 8 |
| 129 | Francesco Tomei (ITA) | DNF-12 |

Liquigas LIQ
| No. | Rider | Pos. |
| 131 | Ivan Basso (ITA) | 4 |
| 132 | Daniele Bennati (ITA) | 84 |
| 133 | Maciej Bodnar (POL) | 131 |
| 134 | Kjell Carlström (FIN) | 91 |
| 135 | Roman Kreuziger (CZE) | 61 |
| 136 | Manuel Quinziato (ITA) | 126 |
| 137 | Fabio Sabatini (ITA) | 115 |
| 138 | Sylwester Szmyd (POL) | 17 |
| 139 | Oliver Zaugg (SUI) | 70 |

Quick-Step QST
| No. | Rider | Pos. |
| 141 | Tom Boonen (BEL) | DNF-13 |
| 142 | Carlos Barredo (ESP) | DNF-9 |
| 143 | Allan Davis (AUS) | DNF-9 |
| 144 | Kevin De Weert (BEL) | 20 |
| 145 | Stijn Devolder (BEL) | 85 |
| 146 | Matteo Tosatto (ITA) | DNF-19 |
| 147 | Marco Velo (ITA) | 93 |
| 148 | Wouter Weylandt (BEL) | DNS-17 |
| 149 | Maarten Wijnants (BEL) | 113 |

Rabobank RAB
| No. | Rider | Pos. |
| 151 | Óscar Freire (ESP) | DNF-13 |
| 152 | Lars Boom (NED) | 55 |
| 153 | Juan Manuel Gárate (ESP) | 38 |
| 154 | Robert Gesink (NED) | 6 |
| 155 | Tom Leezer (NED) | 129 |
| 156 | Paul Martens (GER) | DNF-12 |
| 157 | Koos Moerenhout (NED) | 36 |
| 158 | Bram Tankink (NED) | 34 |
| 159 | Pieter Weening (NED) | 44 |

Silence–Lotto SIL
| No. | Rider | Pos. |
| 161 | Cadel Evans (AUS) | 3 |
| 162 | Christophe Brandt (BEL) | 125 |
| 163 | Francis De Greef (BEL) | 21 |
| 164 | Mickaël Delage (FRA) | 73 |
| 165 | Philippe Gilbert (BEL) | 54 |
| 166 | Olivier Kaisen (BEL) | 86 |
| 167 | Matthew Lloyd (AUS) | 50 |
| 168 | Jürgen Roelandts (BEL) | 119 |
| 169 | Charly Wegelius (GBR) | DNF-4 |

Team Columbia–HTC THR
| No. | Rider | Pos. |
| 171 | André Greipel (GER) | 107 |
| 172 | Michael Albasini (SUI) | DNF-11 |
| 173 | Bert Grabsch (GER) | DNS-18 |
| 174 | Adam Hansen (AUS) | 94 |
| 175 | Greg Henderson (NZL) | 123 |
| 176 | Kim Kirchen (LUX) | DNS-6 |
| 177 | František Raboň (CZE) | 134 |
| 178 | Vicente Reynés (ESP) | 103 |
| 179 | Marcel Sieberg (GER) | 122 |

Team Milram MRM
| No. | Rider | Pos. |
| 181 | Gerald Ciolek (GER) | DNF-18 |
| 182 | Linus Gerdemann (GER) | DNS-12 |
| 183 | Christian Knees (GER) | 43 |
| 184 | Dominik Roels (GER) | 83 |
| 185 | Thomas Rohregger (AUT) | DNS-10 |
| 186 | Matthias Russ (GER) | 90 |
| 187 | Björn Schröder (GER) | DNF-13 |
| 188 | Martin Velits (SVK) | 95 |
| 189 | Paul Voss (GER) | 99 |

Team Saxo Bank SAX
| No. | Rider | Pos. |
| 191 | Andy Schleck (LUX) | DNF-8 |
| 192 | Kurt Asle Arvesen (NOR) | 108 |
| 193 | Matti Breschel (DEN) | 68 |
| 194 | Fabian Cancellara (SUI) | DNS-14 |
| 195 | Jakob Fuglsang (DEN) | 56 |
| 196 | Alexandr Kolobnev (RUS) | 31 |
| 197 | Karsten Kroon (NED) | 76 |
| 198 | Stuart O'Grady (AUS) | DNS-17 |
| 199 | Fränk Schleck (LUX) | DNS-11 |

Vacansoleil VAC
| No. | Rider | Pos. |
| 201 | Matteo Carrara (ITA) | 37 |
| 202 | Borut Božič (SLO) | 102 |
| 203 | Johnny Hoogerland (NED) | 12 |
| 204 | Sergey Lagutin (UZB) | 104 |
| 205 | Björn Leukemans (BEL) | DNF-18 |
| 206 | Marco Marcato (ITA) | DNS-12 |
| 207 | Jens Mouris (NED) | 138 |
| 208 | Matthé Pronk (NED) | 124 |
| 209 | Lieuwe Westra (NED) | 87 |

Xacobeo–Galicia XGZ
| No. | Rider | Pos. |
| 211 | Ezequiel Mosquera (ESP) | 5 |
| 212 | Gustavo César (ESP) | 41 |
| 213 | Gustavo Domínguez (ESP) | 77 |
| 214 | Alberto Fernandez Sainz (ESP) | DNS-12 |
| 215 | David García (ESP) | 23 |
| 216 | David Herrero (ESP) | 28 |
| 217 | Serafín Martínez (ESP) | 39 |
| 218 | Gonzalo Rabuñal (ESP) | 67 |
| 219 | Eduard Vorganov (RUS) | 26 |

== Cyclists ==
| # | Rider | Team | Nationality | Pos. |
| 1 | Samuel Sánchez | Euskaltel–Euskadi | Spain | 2 |
| 2 | Igor Antón | Euskaltel–Euskadi | Spain | 33 |
| 3 | Aitor Hernández | Euskaltel–Euskadi | Spain | 96 |
| 4 | Iñaki Isasi | Euskaltel–Euskadi | Spain | 71 |
| 5 | Markel Irizar | Euskaltel–Euskadi | Spain | 114 |
| 6 | Egoi Martínez | Euskaltel–Euskadi | Spain | 52 |
| 7 | Alan Pérez | Euskaltel–Euskadi | Spain | 92 |
| 8 | Rubén Pérez | Euskaltel–Euskadi | Spain | 98 |
| 9 | Amets Txurruka | Euskaltel–Euskadi | Spain | 29 |
| 11 | Tadej Valjavec | Ag2r–La Mondiale | Slovenia | 30 |
| 12 | José Luis Arrieta | Ag2r–La Mondiale | Spain | 81 |
| 13 | Alexander Efimkin | Ag2r–La Mondiale | Russia | DNF-17 |
| 14 | John Gadret | Ag2r–La Mondiale | France | DNF-11 |
| 15 | Sébastien Hinault | Ag2r–La Mondiale | France | 69 |
| 16 | Julien Loubet | Ag2r–La Mondiale | France | DNF-18 |
| 17 | Rinaldo Nocentini | Ag2r–La Mondiale | Italy | DNF-13 |
| 18 | Christophe Riblon | Ag2r–La Mondiale | France | 46 |
| 19 | Ludovic Turpin | Ag2r–La Mondiale | France | 64 |
| 21 | Xavier Tondó | Andalucía–Cajasur | Spain | DNS-14 |
| 22 | Manuel Calvente | Andalucía–Cajasur | Spain | 47 |
| 23 | José Antonio López | Andalucía–Cajasur | Spain | DNF-10 |
| 24 | Francisco José Martínez | Andalucía–Cajasur | Spain | 75 |
| 25 | Manuel Ortega | Andalucía–Cajasur | Spain | DNF-6 |
| 26 | Antonio Piedra | Andalucía–Cajasur | Spain | 78 |
| 27 | Javier Ramírez | Andalucía–Cajasur | Spain | 62 |
| 28 | Jesús Rosendo | Andalucía–Cajasur | Spain | 106 |
| 29 | José Ruíz | Andalucía–Cajasur | Spain | 118 |
| 31 | Haimar Zubeldia | Astana | Spain | 14 |
| 32 | Assan Bazayev | Astana | Kazakhstan | 130 |
| 33 | Jesús Hernández | Astana | Spain | 19 |
| 34 | Chris Horner | Astana | United States | DNS-5 |
| 35 | Maxim Iglinsky | Astana | Kazakhstan | DNS-18 |
| 36 | Daniel Navarro | Astana | Spain | 13 |
| 37 | José Luis Rubiera | Astana | Spain | DNF-12 |
| 38 | Michael Schär | Astana | Switzerland | 110 |
| 39 | Alexander Vinokourov | Astana | Kazakhstan | DNF-12 |
| 41 | Pierrick Fédrigo | Bbox Bouygues Telecom | France | DNF-12 |
| 42 | Giovanni Bernaudeau | Bbox Bouygues Telecom | France | DNF-8 |
| 43 | Olivier Bonnaire | Bbox Bouygues Telecom | France | 48 |
| 44 | William Bonnet | Bbox Bouygues Telecom | France | 109 |
| 45 | Franck Bouyer | Bbox Bouygues Telecom | France | DNF-13 |
| 46 | Damien Gaudin | Bbox Bouygues Telecom | France | 139 |
| 47 | Vincent Jérôme | Bbox Bouygues Telecom | France | DNF-8 |
| 48 | Laurent Lefèvre | Bbox Bouygues Telecom | France | DNF-9 |
| 49 | Matthieu Sprick | Bbox Bouygues Telecom | France | 57 |
| 51 | Alejandro Valverde | Caisse d'Epargne | Spain | 1 |
| 52 | Imanol Erviti | Caisse d'Epargne | Spain | 100 |
| 53 | José Vicente García | Caisse d'Epargne | Spain | 137 |
| 54 | Vasil Kiryienka | Caisse d'Epargne | Belarus | 16 |
| 55 | Daniel Moreno | Caisse d'Epargne | Spain | 11 |
| 56 | David López | Caisse d'Epargne | Spain | 42 |
| 57 | Francisco Pérez | Caisse d'Epargne | Spain | 88 |
| 58 | Joaquim Rodríguez | Caisse d'Epargne | Spain | 7 |
| 59 | Xabier Zandio | Caisse d'Epargne | Spain | 112 |
| 61 | Íñigo Cuesta | Cervélo TestTeam | Spain | 35 |
| 62 | Philip Deignan | Cervélo TestTeam | Ireland | 9 |
| 63 | Xavier Florencio | Cervélo TestTeam | Spain | 59 |
| 64 | Simon Gerrans | Cervélo TestTeam | Australia | DNF-13 |
| 65 | José Ángel Gómez Marchante | Cervélo TestTeam | Spain | 22 |
| 66 | Roger Hammond | Cervélo TestTeam | Great Britain | 97 |
| 67 | Ignatas Konovalovas | Cervélo TestTeam | Lithuania | DNS-14 |
| 68 | Gabriel Rasch | Cervélo TestTeam | Norway | 101 |
| 69 | Dominique Rollin | Cervélo TestTeam | Canada | DNF-13 |
| 71 | David Moncoutié | Cofidis | France | 27 |
| 72 | Mickaël Buffaz | Cofidis | France | 89 |
| 73 | Jean Eudes Demaret | Cofidis | France | 127 |
| 74 | Leonardo Duque | Cofidis | Colombia | 32 |
| 75 | Julien El Fares | Cofidis | France | 49 |
| 76 | Bingen Fernández | Cofidis | Spain | 58 |
| 77 | Amaël Moinard | Cofidis | France | 18 |
| 78 | Damien Monier | Cofidis | France | 65 |
| 79 | Rein Taaramäe | Cofidis | Estonia | 74 |
| 81 | Julián Sánchez | Contentpolis–Ampo | Spain | 79 |
| 82 | Javier Benítez | Contentpolis–Ampo | Spain | 116 |
| 83 | Sergio Domínguez | Contentpolis–Ampo | Spain | DNF-19 |
| 84 | Óscar García | Contentpolis–Ampo | Spain | DNF-6 |
| 85 | Mikel Gaztañaga | Contentpolis–Ampo | Spain | DNF-9 |
| 86 | Francisco José Pacheco | Contentpolis–Ampo | Spain | 121 |
| 87 | Adrián Palomares | Contentpolis–Ampo | Spain | 45 |
| 88 | Aitor Pérez | Contentpolis–Ampo | Spain | 111 |
| 89 | Manuel Vázquez | Contentpolis–Ampo | Spain | 15 |
| 91 | Sandy Casar | Française des Jeux | France | DNF-14 |
| 92 | Sébastien Chavanel | Française des Jeux | France | DNF-13 |
| 93 | Mickaël Cherel | Française des Jeux | France | 25 |
| 94 | Rémy Di Gregorio | Française des Jeux | France | 51 |
| 95 | Arnaud Gérard | Française des Jeux | France | 105 |
| 96 | Timothy Gudsell | Française des Jeux | New Zealand | 136 |
| 97 | Mathieu Ladagnous | Française des Jeux | France | 63 |
| 98 | Anthony Roux | Française des Jeux | France | 120 |
| 99 | Wesley Sulzberger | Française des Jeux | Australia | 117 |
| 101 | Juan José Cobo | Fuji–Servetto | Spain | 10 |
| 102 | Eros Capecchi | Fuji–Servetto | Spain | DNF-13 |
| 103 | David de la Fuente | Fuji–Servetto | Spain | 24 |
| 104 | Jesús Del Nero | Fuji–Servetto | Spain | 66 |
| 105 | Arkaitz Durán | Fuji–Servetto | Spain | 40 |
| 106 | Beñat Intxausti | Fuji–Servetto | Spain | 60 |
| 107 | Fredrik Kessiakoff | Fuji–Servetto | Sweden | 72 |
| 108 | Robert Kišerlovski | Fuji–Servetto | Croatia | DNS-5 |
| 109 | Davide Viganò | Fuji–Servetto | Italy | DNF-13 |
| 111 | Tom Danielson | Garmin–Slipstream | United States | DNF-18 |
| 112 | Julian Dean | Garmin–Slipstream | New Zealand | 132 |
| 113 | Tyler Farrar | Garmin–Slipstream | United States | DNS-12 |
| 114 | Ryder Hesjedal | Garmin–Slipstream | Canada | DNS-18 |
| 115 | Martijn Maaskant | Garmin–Slipstream | Netherlands | 135 |
| 116 | Dan Martin | Garmin–Slipstream | Ireland | 53 |
| 117 | Christian Meier | Garmin–Slipstream | Canada | DNS-18 |
| 118 | David Millar | Garmin–Slipstream | Great Britain | 80 |
| 119 | Svein Tuft | Garmin–Slipstream | Canada | DNF-15 |
| 121 | Damiano Cunego | Lampre–NGC | Italy | DNS-17 |
| 122 | Alessandro Ballan | Lampre–NGC | Italy | DNS-17 |
| 123 | Emanuele Bindi | Lampre–NGC | Italy | 128 |
| 124 | Vitaliy Buts | Lampre–NGC | Ukraine | DNS-12 |
| 125 | Enrico Gasparotto | Lampre–NGC | Italy | 82 |
| 126 | Marco Marzano | Lampre–NGC | Italy | DNF-14 |
| 127 | Massimiliano Mori | Lampre–NGC | Italy | 133 |
| 128 | Paolo Tiralongo | Lampre–NGC | Italy | 8 |
| 129 | Francesco Tomei | Lampre–NGC | Italy | DNF-12 |
| 131 | Ivan Basso | Liquigas | Italy | 4 |
| 132 | Daniele Bennati | Liquigas | Italy | 84 |
| 133 | Maciej Bodnar | Liquigas | Poland | 131 |
| 134 | Kjell Carlström | Liquigas | Finland | 91 |
| 135 | Roman Kreuziger | Liquigas | Czech Republic | 61 |
| 136 | Manuel Quinziato | Liquigas | Italy | 126 |
| 137 | Fabio Sabatini | Liquigas | Italy | 115 |
| 138 | Sylwester Szmyd | Liquigas | Poland | 17 |
| 139 | Oliver Zaugg | Liquigas | Switzerland | 70 |
| 141 | Tom Boonen | Quick-Step | Belgium | DNF-13 |
| 142 | Carlos Barredo | Quick-Step | Spain | DNF-9 |
| 143 | Allan Davis | Quick-Step | Australia | DNF-9 |
| 144 | Kevin De Weert | Quick-Step | Belgium | 20 |
| 145 | Stijn Devolder | Quick-Step | Belgium | 85 |
| 146 | Matteo Tosatto | Quick-Step | Italy | DNF-19 |
| 147 | Marco Velo | Quick-Step | Italy | 93 |
| 148 | Wouter Weylandt | Quick-Step | Belgium | DNS-17 |
| 149 | Maarten Wijnants | Quick-Step | Belgium | 113 |
| 151 | Óscar Freire | Rabobank | Spain | DNF-13 |
| 152 | Lars Boom | Rabobank | Netherlands | 55 |
| 153 | Juan Manuel Gárate | Rabobank | Spain | 38 |
| 154 | Robert Gesink | Rabobank | Netherlands | 6 |
| 155 | Tom Leezer | Rabobank | Netherlands | 129 |
| 156 | Paul Martens | Rabobank | Germany | DNF-12 |
| 157 | Koos Moerenhout | Rabobank | Netherlands | 36 |
| 158 | Bram Tankink | Rabobank | Netherlands | 34 |
| 159 | Pieter Weening | Rabobank | Netherlands | 44 |
| 161 | Cadel Evans | Silence–Lotto | Australia | 3 |
| 162 | Christophe Brandt | Silence–Lotto | Belgium | 125 |
| 163 | Francis De Greef | Silence–Lotto | Belgium | 21 |
| 164 | Mickaël Delage | Silence–Lotto | France | 73 |
| 165 | Philippe Gilbert | Silence–Lotto | Belgium | 54 |
| 166 | Olivier Kaisen | Silence–Lotto | Belgium | 86 |
| 167 | Matthew Lloyd | Silence–Lotto | Australia | 50 |
| 168 | Jurgen Roelandts | Silence–Lotto | Belgium | 119 |
| 169 | Charly Wegelius | Silence–Lotto | Great Britain | DNF-4 |
| 171 | André Greipel | Team Columbia–HTC | Germany | 107 |
| 172 | Michael Albasini | Team Columbia–HTC | Switzerland | DNF-11 |
| 173 | Bert Grabsch | Team Columbia–HTC | Germany | DNS-18 |
| 174 | Adam Hansen | Team Columbia–HTC | Australia | 104 |
| 175 | Greg Henderson | Team Columbia–HTC | New Zealand | 123 |
| 176 | Kim Kirchen | Team Columbia–HTC | Luxembourg | DNS-6 |
| 177 | František Raboň | Team Columbia–HTC | Czech Republic | 134 |
| 178 | Vicente Reynès | Team Columbia–HTC | Spain | 103 |
| 179 | Marcel Sieberg | Team Columbia–HTC | Germany | 122 |
| 181 | Gerald Ciolek | Team Milram | Germany | DNF-18 |
| 182 | Linus Gerdemann | Team Milram | Germany | DNS-12 |
| 183 | Christian Knees | Team Milram | Germany | 43 |
| 184 | Dominik Roels | Team Milram | Germany | 83 |
| 185 | Thomas Rohregger | Team Milram | Austria | DNS-10 |
| 186 | Matthias Russ | Team Milram | Germany | 90 |
| 187 | Björn Schröder | Team Milram | Germany | DNF-13 |
| 188 | Martin Velits | Team Milram | Slovakia | 95 |
| 189 | Paul Voss | Team Milram | Germany | 99 |
| 191 | Andy Schleck | Team Saxo Bank | Luxembourg | DNF-8 |
| 192 | Kurt Asle Arvesen | Team Saxo Bank | Norway | 108 |
| 193 | Matti Breschel | Team Saxo Bank | Denmark | 68 |
| 194 | Fabian Cancellara | Team Saxo Bank | Switzerland | DNS-14 |
| 195 | Jakob Fuglsang | Team Saxo Bank | Denmark | 56 |
| 196 | Alexandr Kolobnev | Team Saxo Bank | Russia | 31 |
| 197 | Karsten Kroon | Team Saxo Bank | Netherlands | 76 |
| 198 | Stuart O'Grady | Team Saxo Bank | Australia | DNS-17 |
| 199 | Fränk Schleck | Team Saxo Bank | Luxembourg | DNS-11 |
| 201 | Matteo Carrara | Vacansoleil | Germany | 37 |
| 202 | Borut Božič | Vacansoleil | Slovenia | 102 |
| 203 | Johnny Hoogerland | Vacansoleil | Netherlands | 12 |
| 204 | Sergey Lagutin | Vacansoleil | Uzbekistan | 104 |
| 205 | Björn Leukemans | Vacansoleil | Belgium | DNF-18 |
| 206 | Marco Marcato | Vacansoleil | Italy | DNS-12 |
| 207 | Jens Mouris | Vacansoleil | Netherlands | 138 |
| 208 | Matthé Pronk | Vacansoleil | Netherlands | 124 |
| 209 | Lieuwe Westra | Vacansoleil | Netherlands | 87 |
| 211 | Ezequiel Mosquera | Xacobeo–Galicia | Spain | 5 |
| 212 | Gustavo César | Xacobeo–Galicia | Spain | 41 |
| 213 | Gustavo Domínguez | Xacobeo–Galicia | Spain | 77 |
| 214 | Alberto Fernández | Xacobeo–Galicia | Spain | DNS-12 |
| 215 | David García | Xacobeo–Galicia | Spain | 23 |
| 216 | David Herrero | Xacobeo–Galicia | Spain | 28 |
| 217 | Serafín Martínez | Xacobeo–Galicia | Spain | 39 |
| 218 | Gonzalo Rabuñal | Xacobeo–Galicia | Spain | 67 |
| 219 | Eduard Vorganov | Xacobeo–Galicia | Russia | 26 |
