= 2009 Volta a Catalunya =

2009 UCI World Ranking, race 14 of 24

Race details
- Dates: 18–24 May 2009
- Stages: 7
- Distance: 987.9 km (613.9 mi)
- Winning time: 24h 12' 10"

Results
Jersey awarded to the overall winner	Winner	Alejandro Valverde (ESP)	(Caisse d'Epargne)
	Second	Dan Martin (IRL)	(Garmin–Slipstream)
	Third	Haimar Zubeldia (ESP)	(Astana)
Jersey awarded to the mountains classification winner	Mountains	Julián Sánchez (ESP)	(Contentpolis-Ampo)
Jersey awarded to the sprints classification winner	Sprints	Samuel Dumoulin (FRA)	(Cofidis)
	Team	Astana	

The 2009 Volta a Catalunya was the 89th edition of the Volta. It took place between 18 May and 24 May, and was part of both the ProTour and the inaugural World Calendar. It began with a short individual time trial in Lloret de Mar and ended in Montmeló at the Circuit de Catalunya.

== Teams ==
As the Volta a Catalunya is a UCI ProTour event, all 18 ProTour teams were invited automatically. They were joined by three Professional Continental teams.

- Quick-Step
- Silence–Lotto
- Team Saxo Bank
- Ag2r–La Mondiale
- Bbox Bouygues Telecom
- Cofidis
- Française des Jeux
- Team Milram
- Lampre–NGC
- Liquigas
- Astana
- Rabobank
- Team Katusha
- Andalucía–CajaSur
- Caisse d'Epargne
- Contentpolis-Ampo
- Euskaltel–Euskadi
- Fuji–Servetto
- Cervélo TestTeam
- Garmin–Slipstream
- Team Columbia–High Road

== Route ==
Stage characteristics and winners
Stage	Date	Course	Distance	Type	Winner
1	18 May	Lloret de Mar to Lloret de Mar	3.6 km (2.2 mi)	Individual time trial	Thor Hushovd (NOR)
2	19 May	Girona to Roses	163.1 km (101.3 mi)		Matti Breschel (DEN)
3	20 May	Roses to La Pobla de Lillet	182.9 km (113.6 mi)		Alejandro Valverde (ESP)
4	21 May	La Pobla de Lillet to Vallnord	175.7 km (109.2 mi)		Julián Sánchez (ESP)
5	22 May	La Seu d'Urgell to Torredembarra	201.3 km (125.1 mi)		Nikolay Trusov (RUS)
6	23 May	Torredembarra to Barcelona	150.5 km (93.5 mi)		Thor Hushovd (NOR)
7	24 May	Sant Cugat to Circuit de Catalunya	110.8 km (68.8 mi)		Greg Henderson (NZL)

== Stages ==
=== Stage 1 ===
18 May 2009 – Lloret de Mar, 3.6 km (ITT)

The course for the brief individual time trial is perfectly flat.

Despite clocking in ten seconds slower than he had on the identical course in the 2008 Volta, Thor Hushovd was the winner of the short individual time trial for the second year in a row, narrowly edging out Alejandro Valverde to don the first white jersey.

Stage 1 Results and General Classification after Stage 1

	Cyclist	Team	Time
1	Thor Hushovd (NOR)	Cervélo TestTeam	4' 47"
2	Alejandro Valverde (ESP)	Caisse d'Epargne	+ 1"
3	Greg Henderson (NZL)	Team Columbia–High Road	+ 2"
4	Mathieu Ladagnous (FRA)	Française des Jeux	+ 3"
5	Sylvain Chavanel (FRA)	Quick-Step	+ 3"
6	Jussi Veikkanen (FIN)	Française des Jeux	+ 3"
7	Dominique Cornu (BEL)	Quick-Step	+ 3"
8	Niki Terpstra (NED)	Team Milram	+ 4"
9	Daniel Oss (ITA)	Liquigas	+ 4"
10	Brett Lancaster (AUS)	Cervélo TestTeam	+ 4"

=== Stage 2 ===
19 May 2009 – Girona to Roses, 163.1 km

This course was hilly, with three categorized climbs, including one about 15 kilometers from the finish.

A four-man breakaway was away for much of the stage. They claimed the intermediate sprints and the first two climbs, putting Samuel Dumoulin and Lloyd Mondory, respectively, in the leading jerseys for those classifications. They were caught on the last climb of the day, the Alt de San Pere De Rodes, during which race leader Thor Hushovd was dropped and his Cervélo team decided to work for Xavier Florencio. A group of 54 riders was together at the finish for a final sprint, won by Matti Breschel. The race lead transferred to Alejandro Valverde, who was surprised to get it, since he did not contest the sprint and did not get any time bonuses.

Stage 2 Results

	Cyclist	Team	Time
1	Matti Breschel (DEN)	Team Saxo Bank	4h 11' 34"
2	Jérôme Pineau (FRA)	Quick-Step	s.t.
3	Xavier Florencio (ESP)	Cervélo TestTeam	s.t.
4	Nicolas Roche (IRL)	Ag2r–La Mondiale	s.t.
5	David de la Fuente (ESP)	Fuji–Servetto	s.t.
6	Yury Trofimov (RUS)	Bbox Bouygues Telecom	s.t.
7	Paul Martens (GER)	Rabobank	s.t.
8	Juan Antonio Flecha (ESP)	Rabobank	s.t.
9	Cyril Dessel (FRA)	Ag2r–La Mondiale	s.t.
10	Michael Albasini (SUI)	Team Columbia–High Road	s.t.

General Classification after Stage 2

	Cyclist	Team	Time
1	Alejandro Valverde (ESP)	Caisse d'Epargne	4h 16' 22"
2	Jérôme Pineau (FRA)	Quick-Step	+ 0"
3	Xavier Florencio (ESP)	Cervélo TestTeam	+ 1"
4	Sylvain Chavanel (FRA)	Quick-Step	+ 2"
5	Jussi Veikkanen (FIN)	Française des Jeux	+ 2"
6	Matti Breschel (DEN)	Team Saxo Bank	+ 3"
7	Nicolas Roche (IRL)	Ag2r–La Mondiale	+ 4"
8	Haimar Zubeldia (ESP)	Astana	+ 4"
9	Vladimir Karpets (RUS)	Team Katusha	+ 4"
10	Samuel Sánchez (ESP)	Euskaltel–Euskadi	+ 5"

=== Stage 3 ===
20 May 2009 – Roses to La Pobla de Lillet, 182.8 km

This was a mountainous stage, and it was thought to see a definitive split between those riders who aimed for the final podium and those who didn't. The stage started at sea level, but climbed to 1,031 meters after about 80 kilometers on the road. There were two other categorized climbs on the course, including a steep climb to 1,200 meters right before the end of the stage, which came on the descent from that climb.

This stage saw race leader Alejandro Valverde extend his lead with a stage win. After the peloton, paced by his team Caisse d'Epargne, caught the morning's breakaway, Valverde himself attacked at the foot of the day's last climb, and the group of nine GC contenders who were able to hold his wheel contested the finish together.

Stage 3 Results

	Cyclist	Team	Time
1	Alejandro Valverde (ESP)	Caisse d'Epargne	4h 46' 53"
2	David de la Fuente (ESP)	Fuji–Servetto	s.t.
3	Dan Martin (IRL)	Garmin–Slipstream	s.t.
4	Samuel Sánchez (ESP)	Euskaltel–Euskadi	s.t.
5	Xavier Tondó (ESP)	Andalucía–CajaSur	s.t.
6	Jakob Fuglsang (DEN)	Team Saxo Bank	s.t.
7	José Ángel Gómez Marchante (ESP)	Cervélo TestTeam	s.t.
8	Mikel Astarloza (ESP)	Euskaltel–Euskadi	s.t.
9	Haimar Zubeldia (ESP)	Astana	s.t.
10	Alexsandr Dyachenko (KAZ)	Astana	s.t.

General Classification after Stage 3

	Cyclist	Team	Time
1	Alejandro Valverde (ESP)	Caisse d'Epargne	9h 03' 05"
2	Haimar Zubeldia (ESP)	Astana	+ 14"
3	Samuel Sánchez (ESP)	Euskaltel–Euskadi	+ 15"
4	Mikel Astarloza (ESP)	Euskaltel–Euskadi	+ 17"
5	Jakob Fuglsang (DEN)	Team Saxo Bank	+ 18"
6	Dan Martin (IRL)	Garmin–Slipstream	+ 19"
7	José Ángel Gómez Marchante (ESP)	Cervélo TestTeam	+ 21"
8	Xavier Tondó (ESP)	Andalucía–CajaSur	+ 23"
9	David de la Fuente (ESP)	Fuji–Servetto	+ 25"
10	Alexsandr Dyachenko (KAZ)	Astana	+ 28"

=== Stage 4 ===
21 May 2009 – La Pobla de Lillet to Vallnord Sector Pal (Andorra), 175.7 km

This stage was undulating at first, and then became mountainous. The Coll del Port (a pass in Catalonia, not to be confused with the pass in France with a very similar name) was visited, and the finish into Andorra was an outside categorization climb, which began 10 kilometers from the finish line. It has been called the 2009 Volta's queen stage.

This stage was conquered by a member of the morning's breakaway, Julián Sánchez. Sánchez and seven others who came clear of the peloton early on in the stage. While the others were absorbed before the Vallnord climb, Sánchez still had a 90-second lead at its foot and managed to stay away just long enough, giving victory in the queen stage of this UCI ProTour event to a non-ProTour team. The GC favorites who had otherwise dominated on the climb were within a kilometer of Sánchez at the finish, with Dan Martin coming the closest to catching him, for second on the stage and a slight time again against race leader Alejandro Valverde. Martin moved from sixth to second in the GC after the stage. As the stages that follow this one are all seen as potentially sprinters' stages, Valverde's team made it clear after this stage that they would work with the teams of the sprinters to ensure mass finishes the rest of the way and protect his 15-second lead over Martin.

Stage 4 Results

	Cyclist	Team	Time
1	Julián Sánchez (ESP)	Contentpolis-Ampo	4h 46' 29"
2	Dan Martin (IRL)	Garmin–Slipstream	+ 6"
3	Alejandro Valverde (ESP)	Caisse d'Epargne	+ 8"
4	Haimar Zubeldia (ESP)	Astana	+ 12"
5	Mikel Astarloza (ESP)	Euskaltel–Euskadi	+ 21"
6	José Ángel Gómez Marchante (ESP)	Cervélo TestTeam	+ 21"
7	Alexsandr Dyachenko (KAZ)	Astana	+ 25"
8	Jakob Fuglsang (DEN)	Team Saxo Bank	+ 31"
9	Xavier Tondó (ESP)	Andalucía–CajaSur	+ 37"
10	John Gadret (FRA)	Ag2r–La Mondiale	+ 1' 06"

General Classification after Stage 4

	Cyclist	Team	Time
1	Alejandro Valverde (ESP)	Caisse d'Epargne	13h 49' 38"
2	Dan Martin (IRL)	Garmin–Slipstream	+ 15"
3	Haimar Zubeldia (ESP)	Astana	+ 22"
4	Mikel Astarloza (ESP)	Euskaltel–Euskadi	+ 34"
5	José Ángel Gómez Marchante (ESP)	Cervélo TestTeam	+ 38"
6	Jakob Fuglsang (DEN)	Team Saxo Bank	+ 45"
7	Alexsandr Dyachenko (KAZ)	Astana	+ 49"
8	Xavier Tondó (ESP)	Andalucía–CajaSur	+ 56"
9	Samuel Sánchez (ESP)	Euskaltel–Euskadi	+ 1' 42"
10	David de la Fuente (ESP)	Fuji–Servetto	+ 1' 52"

=== Stage 5 ===
22 May 2009 – La Seu d'Urgell to Torredembarra, 201.3 km

A fair amount of descending faced the riders in this stage, being that it began at 670 meters in elevation and ended near sea level. Most of the descending took place right before the finish line.

A four-man breakaway came clear of the peloton within the first 10 km of the stage. Their maximum advantage was 4' 30", with Steven Cozza attacking and staying out front for a short while as the peloton absorbed his three breakaway mates. Cozza was also eventually caught, and the finish was contested in a mass sprint, won by Katusha's Nikolay Trusov. Team Katusha came to the Volta thinking that Alexei Markov would be their primary sprinter, but Markov was not with the peloton at the finish. They therefore worked for Trusov in the sprint, as he narrowly edged out accomplished sprinter Thor Hushovd at the line. The top ten in the GC were unchanged by the day's results.

Stage 5 Results

	Cyclist	Team	Time
1	Nikolay Trusov (RUS)	Team Katusha	4h 28' 58"
2	Thor Hushovd (NOR)	Cervélo TestTeam	s.t.
3	Fabio Sabatini (ITA)	Liquigas	s.t.
4	Greg Henderson (NZL)	Team Columbia–High Road	s.t.
5	Pablo Urtasun (ESP)	Euskaltel–Euskadi	s.t.
6	Leonardo Duque (COL)	Cofidis	s.t.
7	Lloyd Mondory (FRA)	Ag2r–La Mondiale	s.t.
8	Hilton Clarke (AUS)	Fuji–Servetto	s.t.
9	Angelo Furlan (ITA)	Lampre–NGC	s.t.
10	Matti Breschel (DEN)	Team Saxo Bank	s.t.

General Classification after Stage 5

	Cyclist	Team	Time
1	Alejandro Valverde (ESP)	Caisse d'Epargne	18h 18' 36"
2	Dan Martin (IRL)	Garmin–Slipstream	+ 15"
3	Haimar Zubeldia (ESP)	Astana	+ 22"
4	Mikel Astarloza (ESP)	Euskaltel–Euskadi	+ 34"
5	José Ángel Gómez Marchante (ESP)	Cervélo TestTeam	+ 38"
6	Jakob Fuglsang (DEN)	Team Saxo Bank	+ 45"
7	Alexsandr Dyachenko (KAZ)	Astana	+ 49"
8	Xavier Tondó (ESP)	Andalucía–CajaSur	+ 56"
9	Samuel Sánchez (ESP)	Euskaltel–Euskadi	+ 1' 42"
10	David de la Fuente (ESP)	Fuji–Servetto	+ 1' 52"

=== Stage 6 ===
23 May 2009 – Torredembarra to Barcelona, 150.5 km

This stage was expected to end in a mass sprint, in spite of the three categorized climbs the course featured. In the last 40 kilometers, there was only a very short climb and a lengthy flat stretch to the finish.

The sprint indeed took place, with the man who was pipped at the line the day before, Thor Hushovd, coming across the line first to claim his second stage win of the Volta. The lead in the mountains classification transferred to Julián Sánchez, who was tied with Xavier Tondó by points, but got the jersey because of his victory on the outside categorization climb in Stage 4. The top ten in the GC were again unchanged, and with only a very short, very flat stage remaining, it was believed that they would be unchanged again for the end of the race.

Stage 6 Results

	Cyclist	Team	Time
1	Thor Hushovd (NOR)	Cervélo TestTeam	3h 26' 43"
2	Fabio Sabatini (ITA)	Liquigas	s.t.
3	Greg Henderson (NZL)	Team Columbia–High Road	s.t.
4	Matti Breschel (DEN)	Team Saxo Bank	s.t.
5	Leonardo Duque (COL)	Cofidis	s.t.
6	Marco Bandiera (ITA)	Lampre–NGC	s.t.
7	Brett Lancaster (AUS)	Cervélo TestTeam	s.t.
8	Samuel Dumoulin (FRA)	Cofidis	s.t.
9	Nicolas Roche (IRL)	Ag2r–La Mondiale	s.t.
10	Roy Sentjens (BEL)	Silence–Lotto	s.t.

General Classification after Stage 6

	Cyclist	Team	Time
1	Alejandro Valverde (ESP)	Caisse d'Epargne	21h 45' 19"
2	Dan Martin (IRL)	Garmin–Slipstream	+ 15"
3	Haimar Zubeldia (ESP)	Astana	+ 22"
4	Mikel Astarloza (ESP)	Euskaltel–Euskadi	+ 34"
5	José Ángel Gómez Marchante (ESP)	Cervélo TestTeam	+ 38"
6	Jakob Fuglsang (DEN)	Team Saxo Bank	+ 45"
7	Alexsandr Dyachenko (KAZ)	Astana	+ 49"
8	Xavier Tondó (ESP)	Andalucía–CajaSur	+ 56"
9	Samuel Sánchez (ESP)	Euskaltel–Euskadi	+ 1' 42"
10	David de la Fuente (ESP)	Fuji–Servetto	+ 1' 52"

=== Stage 7 ===
24 May 2009 – Centre d'Alt Rendiment to Circuit de Catalunya Montmeló, 110.8 km

This course climbed to just over 600 meters. The climb was originally uncategorized, but with Xavier Tondó and Julián Sánchez tied by points for the King of the Mountains jersey, race officials decided to offer points for the climb to have a definitive winner in that classification. The descent from that height took about 50 kilometers, with 10 flat kilometers to race before the finish at the race track in Montmeló.

The short distance and relatively flat profile of the stage kept any breakaways from staying clear. Sánchez managed to outsprint Tondó to the summit of the climb to clinch the red jersey victory for the Contentpolis rider. The majority of the peloton was together for the finish, a sprint which was won by Columbia–High Road's Greg Henderson.

Stage 7 Results

	Cyclist	Team	Time
1	Greg Henderson (NZL)	Team Columbia–High Road	2h 26' 51"
2	Lloyd Mondory (FRA)	Ag2r–La Mondiale	s.t.
3	Fabio Sabatini (ITA)	Liquigas	s.t.
4	Thor Hushovd (NOR)	Cervélo TestTeam	s.t.
5	Pablo Urtasun (ESP)	Euskaltel–Euskadi	s.t.
6	Matti Breschel (DEN)	Team Saxo Bank	s.t.
7	Sebastian Lang (GER)	Silence–Lotto	s.t.
8	Leonardo Duque (COL)	Cofidis	s.t.
9	William Bonnet (FRA)	Bbox Bouygues Telecom	s.t.
10	Roy Sentjens (BEL)	Silence–Lotto	s.t.

Final General Classification

	Cyclist	Team	Time
1	Alejandro Valverde (ESP)	Caisse d'Epargne	24h 12' 10"
2	Dan Martin (IRL)	Garmin–Slipstream	+ 15"
3	Haimar Zubeldia (ESP)	Astana	+ 22"
4	Mikel Astarloza (ESP)	Euskaltel–Euskadi	+ 34"
5	José Ángel Gómez Marchante (ESP)	Cervélo TestTeam	+ 38"
6	Jakob Fuglsang (DEN)	Team Saxo Bank	+ 45"
7	Alexsandr Dyachenko (KAZ)	Astana	+ 49"
8	Xavier Tondó (ESP)	Andalucía–CajaSur	+ 56"
9	Samuel Sánchez (ESP)	Euskaltel–Euskadi	+ 1' 42"
10	David de la Fuente (ESP)	Fuji–Servetto	+ 1' 52"

== Riders' jersey progress table ==
In the 2009 Volta a Catalunya, three different jerseys were awarded. For the general classification, calculated by adding the finishing times of the stages per cyclist, and allowing time bonuses for the first three finishers on mass start stages, the leader received a white jersey with green stripes on the sleeves. This classification is considered the most important of the Volta a Catalunya, and the winner of the general classification is considered the winner of the Volta a Catalunya.

Additionally, there was also a sprint classification, indicated with a blue jersey. In the sprint classification, cyclists got points for being one of the first three in intermediate sprints, with six points awarded for first place, four for second, and two for third.

There was also a mountains classification, indicated with a red jersey. In the mountains classifications, points are won by reaching the top of a mountain before other cyclists. All climbs were categorized, with most either first, second, third, or fourth-category, with more points available for the higher-categorized climbs. There was also an outside categorization climb at the end of Stage 4, which awarded even more points than the first-category climbs.

Stage	Winner	General Classification	Mountains Classification	Sprint Classification	Team Classification
1	Thor Hushovd	Thor Hushovd	no award	no award	Cervélo TestTeam
2	Matti Breschel	Alejandro Valverde	Lloyd Mondory	Samuel Dumoulin	Cervélo TestTeam
3	Alejandro Valverde	Alejandro Valverde	Xavier Tondó	Samuel Dumoulin	Euskaltel–Euskadi
4	Julián Sánchez	Alejandro Valverde	Xavier Tondó	Samuel Dumoulin	Astana
5	Nikolay Trusov	Alejandro Valverde	Xavier Tondó	Samuel Dumoulin	Astana
6	Thor Hushovd	Alejandro Valverde	Julián Sánchez	Samuel Dumoulin	Astana
7	Greg Henderson	Alejandro Valverde	Julián Sánchez	Samuel Dumoulin	Astana
Final		Alejandro Valverde	Julián Sánchez	Samuel Dumoulin	Astana
