= 2012 Vuelta a Andalucía =

Race details
- Dates: 19–23 February
- Stages: 5
- Distance: 649 km (403.3 mi)
- Winning time: 16h 08' 49"

Results
Jersey awarded to the overall winner	Winner	Alejandro Valverde (Spain)	(Movistar Team)
	Second	Rein Taaramäe (Estonia)	(Cofidis)
	Third	Jérôme Coppel (France)	(Saur–Sojasun)
Jersey awarded to the points classification winner	Points	Alejandro Valverde (Spain)	(Movistar Team)
Jersey awarded to the mountains classification winner	Mountains	Luis Ángel Maté (Spain)	(Cofidis)
Jersey awarded to the sprints classification winner	Sprints	Luis Ángel Maté (Spain)	(Cofidis)
	Team	RadioShack–Nissan	

The 2012 Vuelta a Andalucía was the 58th edition of the Vuelta a Andalucía, a regional Spanish road bicycle race. It was rated as a 2.1 event and was the 13th race of the UCI Europe Tour. The race was held over 19–23 February.

The race was won by Spain's Alejandro Valverde, of the Movistar Team, after taking the overall lead with victory on the second stage, and held the lead to the end of the race. Valverde's winning margin over runner-up Rein Taaramäe (Cofidis) was three seconds, and Saur–Sojasun's Jérôme Coppel completed the podium, five seconds behind Taaramäe and eight seconds down on Valverde. In the race's other classifications, Valverde won the points and combination classifications, Cofidis rider Luis Ángel Maté won both the mountains and sprints classifications, and RadioShack–Nissan finished at the head of the teams classification.

== Teams ==
Sixteen teams participated in the 2012 Vuelta a Andalucía, consisting of seven UCI ProTour teams, eight UCI Professional Continental teams, and one UCI Continental Team.

UCI ProTour Teams

- Euskaltel–Euskadi
- Team Katusha
- Lotto–Belisol
- Movistar Team
- Rabobank
- RadioShack–Nissan
- Vacansoleil–DCM

UCI Professional Continental Teams

- Accent.jobs–Willems Veranda's
- Andalucía
- Caja Rural
- Cofidis
- Project 1t4i
- Saur–Sojasun
- SpiderTech–C10
- Team NetApp

UCI Continental Teams

- Team NSP–Ghost

== Stages ==
=== Prologue ===
19 February 2012 — San Fernando 6 km (3.7 mi), Prologue (ITT)

Prologue Results and General Classification after Prologue

	Rider	Team	Time
1	Patrick Gretsch (GER)	Project 1t4i	6' 49"
2	Markel Irizar (ESP)	RadioShack–Nissan	+ 2"
3	Jérôme Coppel (FRA)	Saur–Sojasun	+ 3"
4	Michael Matthews (AUS)	Rabobank	+ 6"
5	Gaëtan Bille (BEL)	Lotto–Belisol	+ 8"
6	Matthias Brändle (AUT)	Team NetApp	+ 10"
7	Maxime Monfort (BEL)	RadioShack–Nissan	+ 10"
8	Wilco Kelderman (NED)	Rabobank	+ 11"
9	Tom Dumoulin (NED)	Project 1t4i	+ 11"
10	Iván Gutiérrez (ESP)	Movistar Team	+ 12"

=== Stage 1 ===
20 February 2012 — Zahara de los Atunes to Benalmádena, 197.9 km (123.0 mi)

Stage 1 result

	Rider	Team	Time
1	Javier Ramírez (ESP)	Andalucía	5h 02' 10"
2	Luis Ángel Maté (ESP)	Cofidis	s.t.
3	Will Routley (CAN)	SpiderTech–C10	+ 3"
4	Óscar Freire (ESP)	Team Katusha	+ 3"
5	Juan José Lobato (ESP)	Andalucía	+ 3"
6	Manuel Antonio Cardoso (POR)	Caja Rural	+ 3"
7	Michael Matthews (AUS)	Rabobank	+ 3"
8	Daniele Bennati (ITA)	RadioShack–Nissan	+ 3"
9	Pim Ligthart (NED)	Vacansoleil–DCM	+ 3"
10	Simon Geschke (GER)	Project 1t4i	+ 3"

General Classification after Stage 1

	Rider	Team	Time
1	Patrick Gretsch (GER)	Project 1t4i	5h 09' 02"
2	Markel Irizar (ESP)	RadioShack–Nissan	+ 2"
3	Jérôme Coppel (FRA)	Saur–Sojasun	+ 3"
4	Michael Matthews (AUS)	Rabobank	+ 6"
5	Gaëtan Bille (BEL)	Lotto–Belisol	+ 8"
6	Matthias Brändle (AUT)	Team NetApp	+ 10"
7	Maxime Monfort (BEL)	RadioShack–Nissan	+ 10"
8	Wilco Kelderman (NED)	Rabobank	+ 11"
9	Tom Dumoulin (NED)	Project 1t4i	+ 11"
10	Iván Gutiérrez (ESP)	Movistar Team	+ 12"

=== Stage 2 ===
21 February 2012 — Málaga to Lucena, 144.7 km (89.9 mi)

Stage 2 result

	Rider	Team	Time
1	Alejandro Valverde (ESP)	Movistar Team	4h 02' 37"
2	Denis Menchov (RUS)	Team Katusha	+ 10"
3	Rein Taaramäe (EST)	Cofidis	+ 10"
4	Fränk Schleck (LUX)	RadioShack–Nissan	+ 10"
5	Sergey Lagutin (UZB)	Vacansoleil–DCM	+ 13"
6	Igor Antón (ESP)	Euskaltel–Euskadi	+ 15"
7	Matteo Carrara (ITA)	Vacansoleil–DCM	+ 21"
8	Adrián Palomares (ESP)	Andalucía	+ 21"
9	Samuel Sánchez (ESP)	Euskaltel–Euskadi	+ 23"
10	Jérôme Coppel (FRA)	Saur–Sojasun	+ 24"

General Classification after Stage 2

	Rider	Team	Time
1	Alejandro Valverde (ESP)	Movistar Team	9h 11' 58"
2	Rein Taaramäe (EST)	Cofidis	+ 3"
3	Jérôme Coppel (FRA)	Saur–Sojasun	+ 8"
4	Denis Menchov (RUS)	Team Katusha	+ 14"
5	Sergey Lagutin (UZB)	Vacansoleil–DCM	+ 15"
6	Tom Dumoulin (NED)	Project 1t4i	+ 18"
7	Samuel Sánchez (ESP)	Euskaltel–Euskadi	+ 21"
8	Fränk Schleck (LUX)	RadioShack–Nissan	+ 22"
9	Matthias Brändle (AUT)	Team NetApp	+ 23"
10	Haimar Zubeldia (ESP)	RadioShack–Nissan	+ 26"

=== Stage 3 ===
22 February 2012 — Montemayor to Las Gabias, 157.1 km (97.6 mi)

Stage 3 result

	Rider	Team	Time
1	Óscar Freire (ESP)	Team Katusha	3h 41' 55"
2	Daniel Schorn (AUT)	Team NetApp	s.t.
3	Michael Matthews (AUS)	Rabobank	s.t.
4	Marco Marcato (ITA)	Vacansoleil–DCM	s.t.
5	Simon Geschke (GER)	Project 1t4i	s.t.
6	Pim Ligthart (NED)	Vacansoleil–DCM	s.t.
7	Stéphane Poulhies (FRA)	Saur–Sojasun	s.t.
8	Daniele Bennati (ITA)	RadioShack–Nissan	s.t.
9	Rein Taaramäe (EST)	Cofidis	s.t.
10	Sergey Lagutin (UZB)	Vacansoleil–DCM	s.t.

General Classification after Stage 3

	Rider	Team	Time
1	Alejandro Valverde (ESP)	Movistar Team	12h 53' 53"
2	Rein Taaramäe (EST)	Cofidis	+ 3"
3	Jérôme Coppel (FRA)	Saur–Sojasun	+ 8"
4	Denis Menchov (RUS)	Team Katusha	+ 14"
5	Sergey Lagutin (UZB)	Vacansoleil–DCM	+ 15"
6	Tom Dumoulin (NED)	Project 1t4i	+ 18"
7	Fränk Schleck (LUX)	RadioShack–Nissan	+ 22"
8	Matthias Brändle (AUT)	Team NetApp	+ 23"
9	Haimar Zubeldia (ESP)	RadioShack–Nissan	+ 26"
10	Mikel Astarloza (ESP)	Euskaltel–Euskadi	+ 27"

=== Stage 4 ===
23 February 2012 — Jaén to La Guardia de Jaén, 135.7 km (84.3 mi)

Stage 4 result

	Rider	Team	Time
1	Daniel Moreno (ESP)	Team Katusha	3h 14' 54"
2	Alejandro Valverde (ESP)	Movistar Team	+ 2"
3	Samuel Sánchez (ESP)	Euskaltel–Euskadi	+ 2"
4	Sergey Lagutin (UZB)	Vacansoleil–DCM	+ 2"
5	Jelle Vanendert (BEL)	Lotto–Belisol	+ 2"
6	Robert Gesink (NED)	Rabobank	+ 2"
7	Denis Menchov (RUS)	Team Katusha	+ 2"
8	Bauke Mollema (NED)	Rabobank	+ 2"
9	Igor Antón (ESP)	Euskaltel–Euskadi	+ 2"
10	Rein Taaramäe (EST)	Cofidis	+ 2"

Final General Classification

	Rider	Team	Time
1	Alejandro Valverde (ESP)	Movistar Team	16h 08' 49"
2	Rein Taaramäe (EST)	Cofidis	+ 3"
3	Jérôme Coppel (FRA)	Saur–Sojasun	+ 8"
4	Denis Menchov (RUS)	Team Katusha	+ 14"
5	Sergey Lagutin (UZB)	Vacansoleil–DCM	+ 15"
6	Tom Dumoulin (NED)	Project 1t4i	+ 18"
7	Fränk Schleck (LUX)	RadioShack–Nissan	+ 22"
8	Haimar Zubeldia (ESP)	RadioShack–Nissan	+ 26"
9	Maxime Monfort (BEL)	RadioShack–Nissan	+ 27"
10	Wilco Kelderman (NED)	Rabobank	+ 28"

== Classification leadership ==
Stage	Winner	General Classification	Mountains Classification	Sprints Classification	Points Classification	Combination Classification	Best Andalusian Rider Classification	Best Spanish Rider Classification	Teams Classification
P	Patrick Gretsch	Patrick Gretsch	not awarded	not awarded	Patrick Gretsch	Patrick Gretsch	Pablo Lechuga	Markel Irizar	RadioShack–Nissan
1	Javier Ramírez	Patrick Gretsch	Luis Ángel Maté	Luis Ángel Maté	Patrick Gretsch	Luis Ángel Maté	Javier Moreno	Markel Irizar	Andalucía
2	Alejandro Valverde	Alejandro Valverde	Mickaël Buffaz	Luis Ángel Maté	Alejandro Valverde	Alejandro Valverde	Javier Moreno	Alejandro Valverde	RadioShack–Nissan
3	Óscar Freire	Alejandro Valverde	Mickaël Buffaz	Luis Ángel Maté	Óscar Freire	Alejandro Valverde	Javier Moreno	Alejandro Valverde	RadioShack–Nissan
4	Daniel Moreno	Alejandro Valverde	Luis Ángel Maté	Luis Ángel Maté	Alejandro Valverde	Alejandro Valverde	Javier Moreno	Alejandro Valverde	RadioShack–Nissan
Final		Alejandro Valverde	Luis Ángel Maté	Luis Ángel Maté	Alejandro Valverde	Alejandro Valverde	Javier Moreno	Alejandro Valverde	RadioShack–Nissan
