= 2008 Volta a la Comunitat Valenciana =

UCI Europe Tour

Race details
- Dates: 26 February -1 March 2008
- Stages: 5
- Distance: 826.5 km (513.6 mi)
- Winning time: 19h 54' 49"

Results
Jersey awarded to the overall winner	Winner	Rubén Plaza (ESP)
	Second	Manuel Vázquez (ESP)
	Third	Xavier Florencio (ESP)
Jersey awarded to the points classification winner	Points	Xavier Florencio (ESP)
Jersey awarded to the mountains classification winner	Mountains	Manuel Vázquez (NED)
Jersey awarded to the team classification winner	Team	Bouygues Télécom

The 2008 Volta a la Comunitat Valenciana was the 66th edition of the Volta a la Comunitat Valenciana road cycling stage race, which was held in the Valencian Community between 26 February and 1 March 2008. The race was won by Rubén Plaza.

== Stages ==
Stage schedule
Stage	Date	Route	Distance	Winner
1	26 February	Sagunto–Port de Sagunto^{es}	157 km (98 mi)	José Iván Gutiérrez (ESP)
2	27 February	Alzira–Xàtiva	178 km (111 mi)	Erik Zabel (GER)
3	28 February	Ibi–Ibi	166.5 km (103 mi)	Manuel Vázquez (ESP)
4	29 February	Náquera–Náquera	149.4 km (93 mi)	Mirco Lorenzetto (ITA)
5	1 March	Valencia–Valencia	120.6 km (75 mi)	~~Alessandro Petacchi~~ (ITA) (Italy) Danilo Napolitano

== Teams ==
N.	Cod.	Team	Category
1-8	AST	(Kazakhstan) Astana	UCI ProTour
11-18	BTL	(France) Bouygues Télécom	UCI ProTour
21-28	GCE	(Spain) Caisse d'Epargne	UCI ProTour
31-38	COF	(France) Cofidis	UCI ProTour
41-48	EUS	(Spain) Euskaltel–Euskadi	UCI ProTour
51-58	LAM	(Italy) Lampre	UCI ProTour
61-68	LIQ	(Italy) Liquigas	UCI ProTour
71-78	MRM	(Italy) Team Milram	UCI ProTour
81-88	RAB	(Netherlands) Rabobank	UCI ProTour

N.	Cod.	Team	Category
91-98	SDV	(Spain) Saunier Duval–Scott	UCI ProTour
101-108	ACA	(Spain) Andalucía–CajaSur	UCI Continental
111-118	SLB	(Portugal) S.L. Benfica	UCI Continental
121-128	GNM	(Spain) Contentpolis–Murcia	UCI Continental
131-138	SPI	(Spain) Extremadura–Grupo Gallardo	UCI Continental
141-148	KGZ	(Spain) Karpin–Galicia	UCI Continental
151-158	TSL	(United States) Team Slipstream–Chipotle p/b H30	UCI Continental
161-168	ORB	(Spain) Orbea–Oreka S.D.A.	UCI Continental

Standings

=== General classification ===
Rank	Cyclist	Team	Time
1	(Spain) Rubén Plaza	S.L. Benfica	19h 54'49"
2	(Spain) Manuel Vázquez Hueso	Contentpolis–Murcia	+ 5"
3	(Spain) Xavier Florencio	Bouygues Télécom	+ 21"
4	(Spain) José Iván Gutiérrez	Caisse d'Epargne	+ 24"
5	(Spain) Gorka Verdugo	Euskaltel–Euskadi	+ 31"
6	(Spain) Alberto Contador	Astana	+ 33"
7	(France) Jérôme Pineau	Bouygues Télécom	+ 35"
8	(Italy) Vincenzo Nibali	Liquigas	m.t.
9	(Belgium) Maxime Monfort	Cofidis	m.t.
10	(Spain) Toni Colom	Astana	m.t.

=== Points classification ===
Rank	Cyclist	Team	Points
1	(Spain) Xavier Florencio	Bouygues Telecom	55
2	(Italy) Mirco Lorenzetto	Lampre	51
3	(Spain) José Iván Gutiérrez	C. d'Epargne	47
4	(Spain) Manuel Vázquez	Contentpolis	45
5	(Spain) Rubén Plaza	S.L. Benfica	44

=== Mountains classification ===
Rank	Cyclist	Team	Points
1	(Spain) Manuel Vázquez	Contentpolis	24
2	(United States) Timothy Duggan	Slipstream	11
3	(Spain) Gorka Verdugo	Euskaltel–Euskadi	11
4	(Netherlands) Koos Moerenhout	Rabobank	10
5	(United States) Jonathan McCarty	Slipstream	10

=== Combativity award ===
Rank	Cyclist	Team	Points
1	(Spain) Manuel Vázquez	Contentpolis	7
2	(Spain) Rubén Plaza	S.L. Benfica	12
3	(Spain) Gorka Verdugo	Euskaltel–Euskadi	17
4	(Spain) Xavier Florencio	Bouygues Tel.	20
5	(France) Jérôme Pineau	Bouygues Tél.	33

=== Team classification ===
Rank	Team	Time
1	(France) Bouygues Télécom	59h46'12"
2	(France) Cofidis, le Crédit par Téléphone	a 1'47"
3	(Portugal) S.L. Benfica	a 3'32"
4	(Italy) Lampre	a 3'52"
5	(Kazakhstan) Astana	a 4'04"

== Classification Leadership ==
Stage	Winner	General classification	Points classification	Mountains classification	Combativity award	Team classification
1ª	José Iván Gutiérrez	José Iván Gutiérrez	José Iván Gutiérrez	Manuel Vázquez	Rubén Plaza	Bouygues Télécom
2ª	Erik Zabel	José Iván Gutiérrez	José Iván Gutiérrez	Manuel Vázquez	Gorka Verdugo	Bouygues Télécom
3ª	Manuel Vázquez	Rubén Plaza	Rubén Plaza	Manuel Vázquez	Manuel Vázquez	Bouygues Télécom
4ª	Mirco Lorenzetto	Rubén Plaza	Xavier Florencio	Manuel Vázquez	Manuel Vázquez	Bouygues Télécom
5ª	~~Alessandro Petacchi~~	Rubén Plaza	Xavier Florencio	Manuel Vázquez	Manuel Vázquez	Bouygues Télécom
Final classification		Rubén Plaza	Xavier Florencio	Manuel Vázquez	Manuel Vázquez	Bouygues Télécom
