= 2009 Vuelta a Burgos =

Race details
- Dates: 5–9 August 2009
- Stages: 5
- Distance: 641 km (398.3 mi)
- Winning time: 15h 49' 33"

Results
	Winner	Alejandro Valverde (ESP)	(Caisse d'Epargne)
	Second	Xavier Tondo (ESP)	(Andalucía–Cajasur)
	Third	Tom Danielson (USA)	(Garmin–Slipstream)

The 2009 Vuelta a Burgos was the 31st edition of the Vuelta a Burgos road cycling stage race, which was held from 5 August to 9 August 2009. The race started in Oña and finished at Lagunas de Neila. The race was won by Alejandro Valverde of the Caisse d'Epargne team.

== General classification ==
Final general classification

Rank	Rider	Team	Time
1	Alejandro Valverde (ESP)	Caisse d'Epargne	15h 49' 33"
2	Xavier Tondo (ESP)	Andalucía–Cajasur	+ 10"
3	Tom Danielson (USA)	Garmin–Slipstream	+ 12"
4	Ezequiel Mosquera (ESP)	Xacobeo–Galicia	+ 30"
5	Mauricio Soler (COL)	Barloworld	+ 1' 11"
6	Francesco Masciarelli (ITA)	Acqua & Sapone–Caffè Mokambo	+ 1' 16"
7	Beñat Intxausti (ESP)	Fuji–Servetto	+ 1' 39"
8	Íñigo Cuesta (ESP)	Cervélo TestTeam	+ 1' 40"
9	Manuel Vázquez Hueso (ESP)	Contentpolis–Ampo	+ 2' 07"
10	Philip Deignan (IRL)	Cervélo TestTeam	+ 2' 14"
