= 2008 Vuelta a Burgos =

Race details
- Dates: 5–9 August 2008
- Stages: 5
- Distance: 802 km (498 mi)
- Winning time: 18h 42' 57"

Results
	Winner	Xabier Zandio (ESP)	(Caisse d'Epargne)
	Second	Iñigo Landaluze (ESP)	(Euskaltel–Euskadi)
	Third	Walter Pedraza (COL)	(Tinkoff Credit Systems)

The 2008 Vuelta a Burgos was the 30th edition of the Vuelta a Burgos road cycling stage race, which was held from 5 August to 9 August 2008. The race started and finished in Burgos. The race was won by Xabier Zandio of the Caisse d'Epargne team.

== General classification ==
Final general classification

Rank	Rider	Team	Time
1	Xabier Zandio (ESP)	Caisse d'Epargne	18h 42' 57"
2	Iñigo Landaluze (ESP)	Euskaltel–Euskadi	+ 12"
3	Walter Pedraza (COL)	Tinkoff Credit Systems	+ 29"
4	Julien Loubet (FRA)	Ag2r–La Mondiale	+ 1' 23"
5	Ezequiel Mosquera (ESP)	Karpin–Galicia	+ 1' 27"
6	Juan José Cobo (ESP)	Scott–American Beef	+ 1' 29"
7	Manuel Vázquez Hueso (ESP)	Contentpolis–Murcia	+ 1' 38"
8	Andrei Kunitski (BLR)	Acqua & Sapone–Caffè Mokambo	+ 1' 41"
9	Daniel Moreno (ESP)	Caisse d'Epargne	+ 1' 47"
10	Stefano Garzelli (ITA)	Acqua & Sapone–Caffè Mokambo	+ 1' 51"
