= Eloy Ruiz =

Spanish cyclist

Personal information
- Full name: Eloy Ruiz Pinto
- Born: 7 January 1989 (age 37) Mollina, Spain
- Height: 173 cm (5 ft 8 in)

Cycling career
- Sport: Cycling
- Current team: Retired
- Discipline: Road
- Role: Rider

Professional team
- 2011–2012: Andalucía

Eloy Ruiz Pinto (born 7 January 1989 in Mollina) is a former Spanish racing cyclist.
