= Antonio Cabello =

Spanish cyclist

Personal information
- Full name: Antonio Cabello Baena
- Born: 5 January 1990 (age 36) Córdoba, Spain

Cycling career
- Sport: Cycling
- Current team: Retired
- Discipline: Road
- Role: Rider

Professional teams
- 2010–2012: Andalucía–Cajasur
- 2013: Team UKYO
- 2014: Team Ecuador

Antonio Cabello Baena (born 5 January 1990 in Córdoba) is a Spanish former professional cyclist. He rode in the 2011 Vuelta a España.
