= 2007 Tour of Britain =

2006–07 UCI Europe Tour

Race details
- Dates: 9–15 September 2007
- Stages: 6 + Prologue
- Distance: 953 km (592 mi)
- Winning time: 21h 21' 33"

Results
Jersey awarded to the overall winner	Winner	Romain Feillu (FRA)	(Agritubel)
	Second	Adrián Palomares (ESP)	(Fuerteventura–Canarias)
	Third	Luke Roberts (AUS)	(Team CSC)
Jersey awarded to the points classification winner	Points	Mark Cavendish (GBR)	(T-Mobile Team)
Jersey awarded to the mountains classification winner	Mountains	Ben Swift (GBR)	(Barloworld)
Jersey awarded to the sprints classification winner	Sprints	Mark Cavendish (GBR)	(T-Mobile Team)

The 2007 edition of the Tour of Britain stage race was run as a UCI 2.1 category in seven stages starting in London on 9 September and finishing in Glasgow on 15 September. The Tour was extended to seven days for 2007, with the extra day being used to run a stage in Somerset for the first time. Instead of finishing in London as in previous years, the 2007 race started in London and finished in Glasgow, which is using the event to boost its bid to host the 2014 Commonwealth Games.

French rider Romain Feillu won the overall race, Mark Cavendish won the Points competition and Ben Swift won the Mountains competition.

== Stages ==
=== Prologue ===
9 September 2007 – London, 2.5 km (1.6 mi)

The tour started with a 2.5 km prologue time trial at the Crystal Palace National Sports Centre. The leader's yellow jersey was claimed by Britain's Mark Cavendish in a time of two minutes 27.6 seconds, ahead of two Russian riders. As a result, Cavendish was the first British rider to take yellow since the Tour of Britain resumed in 2004. The result was debated as the electronic timing system did not turn up and the timing was thus completed with basic stopwatches.

Prologue result.

	Cyclist	Nationality	Team	Time
1	Mark Cavendish	United Kingdom	TMO	2'27.6"
2	Nikolai Trusov	Russia	TCS	+ 1.21"
3	Alexander Serov	Russia	TCS	+ 3.63"

=== Stage 1 ===
10 September 2007 – Reading to Southampton, 138.9 km (86.3 mi)

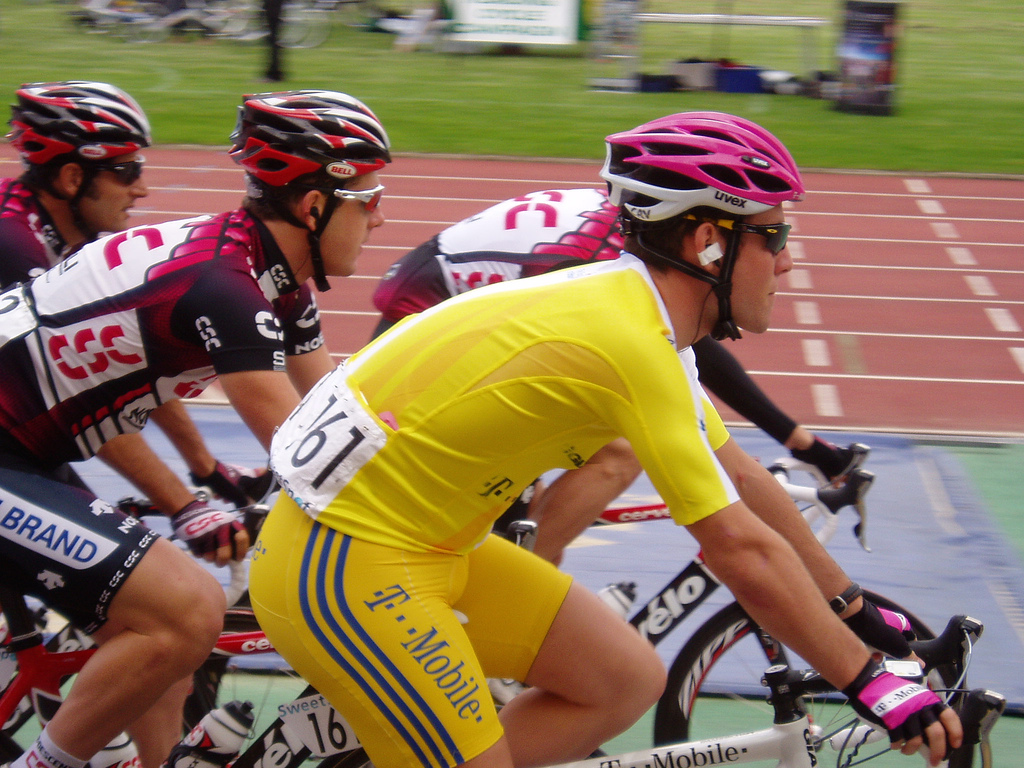
Mark Cavendish at the start of the stage in Palmer Park Stadium, Reading

The first road stage of the tour started at Reading's Palmer Park Stadium, finishing at Southampton's Hoglands Park, in the city centre. En route, it passed through Whitchurch, Stockbridge and the New Forest. The route was relatively level with only two small climbs.

Mark Cavendish extended his overall lead in the Tour, winning the stage by coming home in a bunch sprint ahead of Belgian Steven Caethoven. Pre-race favourite Robbie Hunter crashed with 3.5 km to go and came home on his own four minutes later.

Stage 1 result.

	Cyclist	Nationality	Team	Time
1	Mark Cavendish	United Kingdom	TMO	3h 07'46"
2	Steven Caethoven	Belgium	JAC	same time
3	Juan Jose Haedo	Argentina	CSC	same time

General Classification after Stage 1

	Cyclist	Nationality	Team	Time
1	Mark Cavendish	United Kingdom	TMO	3h 09'59"
2	Nikolai Trusov	Russia	TCS	14"
3	Piet Rooijakkers	Netherlands	SKS	16"

- Leader of the Points competition – Mark Cavendish
- Leader of the King of the Mountains competition – František Raboň

=== Stage 2 ===
11 September 2007 – Yeovilton to Taunton, 169.2 km (105.1 mi)

The second road stage was mainly in Somerset and started at the Fleet Air Arm Museum in Yeovilton before travelling west through Taunton and Dunster. The first major climb of the tour was at Porlock Hill (using the private toll road), which is a First Category King of the Mountains climb. There followed a steep descent into Lynmouth before climbing to Watersmeet, a Second Category climb. The route then passed through Simonsbath and Exford before reaching the final climb at Wheddon Cross. The race finished in the centre of Taunton.

Nikolai Trusov steered clear of a late crash to win the stage and take the yellow jersey from Mark Cavendish. Trusov was part of a 36-man break which made a decisive move after two-thirds of the gruelling 169.5 km leg. He kept pace with the leaders and hit the front after avoiding a four-man pile-up close to the finish in Taunton. Cavendish, the prologue and first stage winner, came home in 34th, more than 10 minutes behind Trusov.

Stage 2 result

	Cyclist	Nationality	Team	Time
1	Nikolai Trusov	Russia	TCS	3h 58'53"
2	Luke Roberts	Australia	CSC	same time
3	Romain Feillu	France	AGR	same time

General Classification after Stage 2

	Cyclist	Nationality	Team	Time
1	Nikolai Trusov	Russia	TCS	7h 08'56"
2	Luke Roberts	Australia	CSC	8"
3	Piet Rooijakkers	Netherlands	SKS	12"

- Leader of the Points competition – Nikolai Trusov
- Leader of the King of the Mountains competition – Serge Pauwels

=== Stage 3 ===
12 September 2007 – Worcester to Wolverhampton, 152.5 km (94.8 mi)

Stage 3 is one of the shortest stages of the 2007 race – the route was constantly undulating featuring an early Category 1 climb through the Malvern Hills before heading north via Ankardine Hill (also Cat. 1) and Bridgnorth to join the Severn Valley at Bewdley, continuing towards the Ironbridge Gorge where the riders tackled the final King of the Mountains climb of the day at Coalport bank 26 km. before the finish in Wolverhampton.

Matt Goss held his nerve in a sprint finish to take victory in the stage, edging out Freddy Bichot and Roger Hammond at the finish in Wolverhampton; but Goss failed to take the overall lead from Russian Nikolai Trusov, who still has an eight-second advantage.

Britons Paul Manning, Ben Swift, Rob Partridge, Mark Cavendish and John Bellis all finished in the top 10.

Stage 3 result

	Cyclist	Nationality	Team	Time
1	Matthew Goss	Australia	CSC	3h 48'41"
2	Freddy Bichot	France	AGR	same time
3	Roger Hammond	United Kingdom	TMO	same time

General Classification after Stage 3

	Cyclist	Nationality	Team	Time
1	Nikolai Trusov	Russia	TCS	11h 03'37"
2	Luke Roberts	Australia	CSC	8"
3	Piet Rooijakkers	Netherlands	SKS	12"

- Leader of the Points competition – Nikolai Trusov & Roger Hammond
- Leader of the King of the Mountains competition – Ben Swift

=== Stage 4 ===
13 September 2007 – Rother Valley Country Park to Bradford, 163.3 km (101.5 mi)

The stage started in Rother Valley Country Park before heading north to the first climb (the Third Category ascent of Limestone Hill) after 18.2 km. The race then passed east of Doncaster before heading into the eastern Pennines. After Ilkley the road headed upwards, to the climb of the Cow & Calf, the final First Category climb of this year's Tour. From the top of the climb, there was just 21 km to the finish in Bradford in Lister Park.

The Tour of Britain organisers honoured charity fundraiser Jane Tomlinson by naming the stage in Yorkshire after the 43-year-old who lost her battle against cancer in the week before the tour commenced.

The stage was marred when the riders were forced to cease racing and ride behind a safety car after organisers failed to close the roads to traffic. The stage was neutralised for 20 miles after a dispute between the organisers and North Yorkshire Police.

After demonstrating his climbing skills in the Pennines, Adrián Palomares took the stage on the line from Tom Stubbe and the yellow jersey from Nikolai Trusov. A 26-man break had developed, with Luke Roberts briefly taking the outright lead, but Palomares hit the front after the race was neutralised. He made a decisive break over the Cow and Calf climb and was able to hold off Stubbe and fellow Spaniard David Blanco in the sprint to the line.

Stage 4 result

	Cyclist	Nationality	Team	Time
1	Adrián Palomares	Spain	FTV	2h 43'41"
2	Tom Stubbe	Belgium	JAC	same time
3	David Blanco	Spain	DUJ	same time

General Classification after Stage 4

	Cyclist	Nationality	Team	Time
1	Adrián Palomares	Spain	FTV	13h 47'30"
2	David Blanco	Spain	DUJ	1"
3	Luke Roberts	Australia	CSC	8"

- Leader of the Points competition – Romain Feillu
- Leader of the King of the Mountains competition – Ben Swift

=== Stage 5 ===
14 September 2007 – Liverpool to Kendal, 170.1 km (105.7 mi)

Stage 5 travelled from the sea to the fells, as the race made its way from Liverpool to the Cumbrian town of Kendal, in the most picturesque stage of this year's race, featuring three categorised climbs and the constantly rolling roads of the Forest of Bowland and the northern Pennines. After leaving Liverpool the stage headed along the coastline, passing the sand dunes and pine forests at Formby and on through Southport. The race then turned inland through Walton le Dale before beginning to climb, on its way up to the Second Category climb of Grizedale. After passing through the historic market town of Kirkby Lonsdale, came the climbs of Old Town and Blease Hill in quick succession. Both of these are Second Category climbs, counting towards the King of the Mountains competition. From the summit of Blease Hill, it was just over 11 kilometres to the finish line in the Kendal at the top of the fearsome Beast Banks.

Alexander Serov took the stage after proving too strong for Mark Cavendish in the final stages. Serov and Cavendish went clear after 72 km before Serov shook off the Briton in the final 16 km, finishing one minute 43 seconds ahead of Cavendish. Adrián Palomares remains one second ahead of fellow Spaniard David Blanco Rodriguez in the overall classification.

Stage 5 result

	Cyclist	Nationality	Team	Time
1	Alexander Serov	Russia	TCS	4h 00'53"
2	Mark Cavendish	United Kingdom	TMO	1'43"
3	Romain Feillu	France	AGR	1'45"

General Classification after Stage 5

	Cyclist	Nationality	Team	Time
1	Adrián Palomares	Spain	FTV	17h 50'12"
2	David Blanco	Spain	DUJ	1"
3	Romain Feillu	France	AGR	3"

- Leader of the Points competition – Romain Feillu
- Leader of the King of the Mountains competition – Ben Swift (United Kingdom BAR)

=== Stage 6 ===
15 September 2007 – Dumfries to Glasgow, 156.5 km (97.2 mi)

The final stage started in Dumfries before heading into the Southern Uplands, with three category 3 climbs at Clovehead, Whiteside Hill and Black Hill (56.5 km from the finish line in Glasgow).

Paul Manning broke for home in the final two kilometres to take the stage win, whilst Romain Feillu beat Adrián Palomares in the final stage to clinch a narrow overall victory. The times were dead level at the end of the race but Feillu was confirmed as the yellow jersey winner by just 0.49 seconds as a result of the times on the opening day's prologue.

Stage 6 result

	Cyclist	Nationality	Team	Time
1	Paul Manning	United Kingdom	GBR	3h 31'04"
2	Salvatore Commesso	Italy	TCS	7"
3	Kurt Hovelijnck	Belgium	JAC	same time

== Final classifications ==
French rider Romain Feillu of Agritubel won the general classification.

	Cyclist	Nationality	Team	Time
1	Romain Feillu	France	AGR	21h 21'33"
2	Adrián Palomares	Spain	FTV	same time
3	Luke Roberts	Australia	CSC	6"

The points competition and sprinters award were won by Mark Cavendish while Ben Swift won the King of the Mountains competition.
