= Luis Pérez Romero =

Spanish cyclist

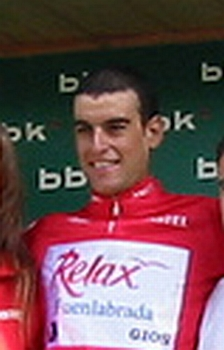

Personal information
- Born: 25 December 1980 (age 45) Madrid, Spain

Cycling career
- Sport: Cycling
- Current team: Retired
- Discipline: Road
- Role: Rider

Professional teams
- 2004–2005: Relax-Bodysol
- 2006–2007: Andalucía-Paul Versan

Luis Pérez Romero (born 25 December 1980) is a former Spanish cyclist.

== Palmares ==
2006
1st Stage 2 Volta a Catalunya
1st Overall Vuelta a Chihuahua

1st Stages 2 & 4
