= Rubén Reig =

Spanish cyclist

Personal information
- Full name: Rubén Reig Conejero
- Born: 29 September 1986 (age 40) Sax, Alicante, Spain

Cycling career
- Sport: Cycling
- Current team: Retired
- Discipline: Road
- Role: Rider

Professional teams
- 2008–2009: Contentpolis–Ampo
- 2010–2011: Caja Rural

Rubén Reig Conejero (born 29 September 1986 in Sax, Alicante) is a Spanish racing cyclist.
