= Calvente =

Calvente is a Spanish surname. Notable people with the surname include:

- Ezequiel Calvente (born 1991), Spanish footballer
- Manuel Calvente (born 1976), Spanish cyclist
