= Perafort =

- Municipality
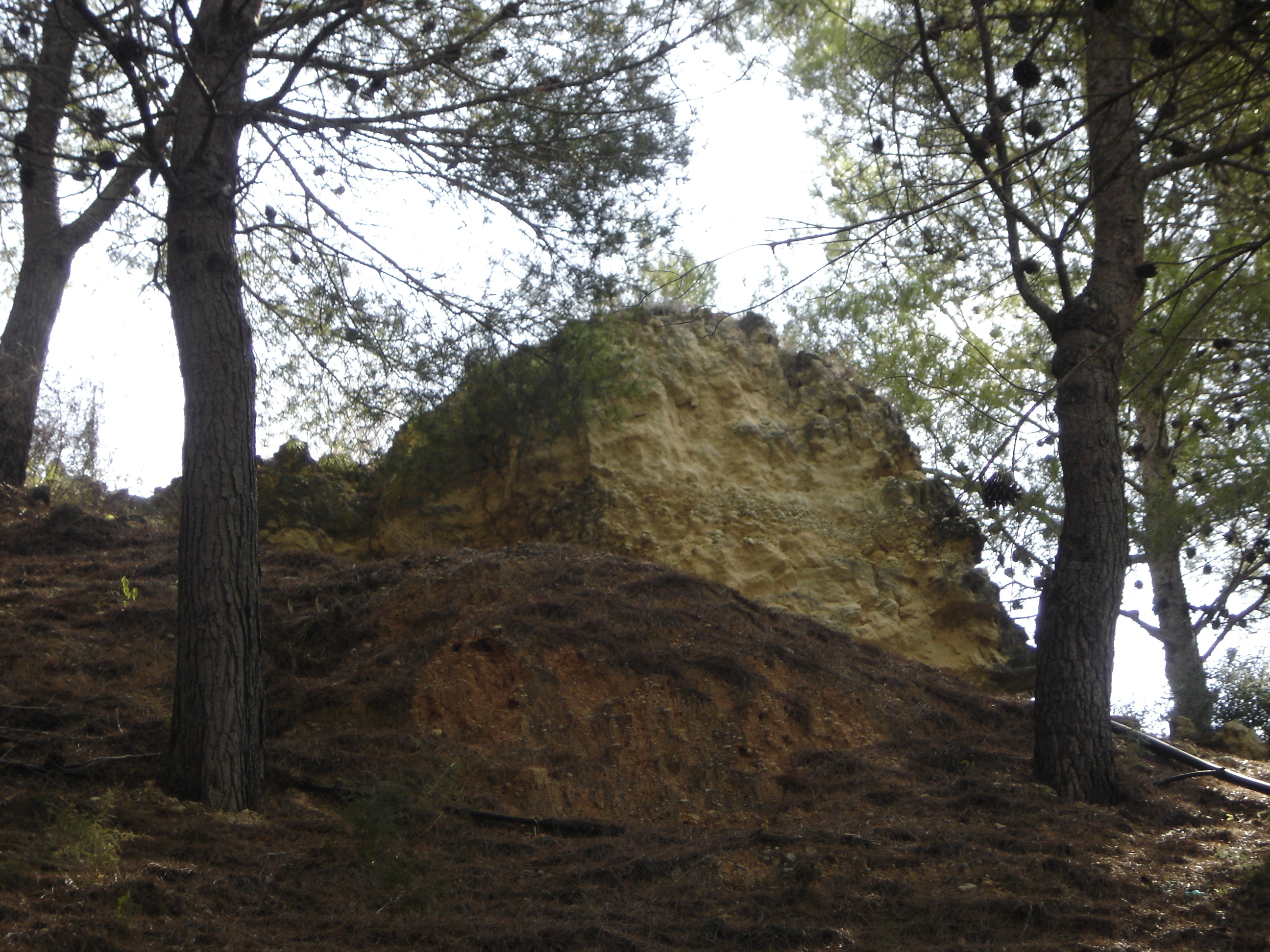
- Puigdelfí castle

- Coat of arms

- Location in Catalonia
- Coordinates: 41°11′33″N 1°15′24″E
- Country: Spain
- Community: Catalonia
- Province: Tarragona
- Comarca: Tarragonès

Government
  - Mayor: Joan Martí Pla Pla (2015)

Area
  - Total: 9.5 km^{2} (3.7 sq mi)
- Elevation: 125 m (410 ft)

Population (2025-01-01)
  - Total: 1,342
  - Density: 140/km^{2} (370/sq mi)
- Postal code: 43152
- Website: www.perafort.com

Perafort (Catalan pronunciation: [ˌpeɾəˈfɔɾt]) or Perafort i Puigdelfí is a municipality in the province of Tarragona, Catalonia, Spain. The municipality has three exclaves to the west and north-west. It has a population of 1,342 (register office, 2025).
