= Francisco José Martínez =

Spanish cyclist

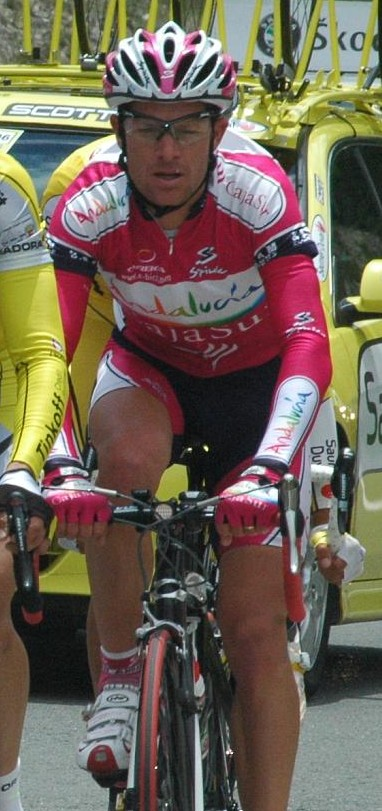

Personal information
- Born: 14 May 1983 (age 43) Churriana de la Vega, Spain

Cycling career
- Sport: Cycling
- Discipline: Road
- Role: Rider

Professional team
- 2005–2009: Andalucía-Paul Versan

Francisco José Martínez Pérez (born 14 May 1983 in Churriana de la Vega) is a Spanish former professional cyclist. He rode in 3 editions of the Vuelta a España.

== Palmares ==
2003
7th Overall Volta ao Algarve
2008
5th Overall Circuito Montañes
