= Óscar García-Casarrubios =

Spanish cyclist

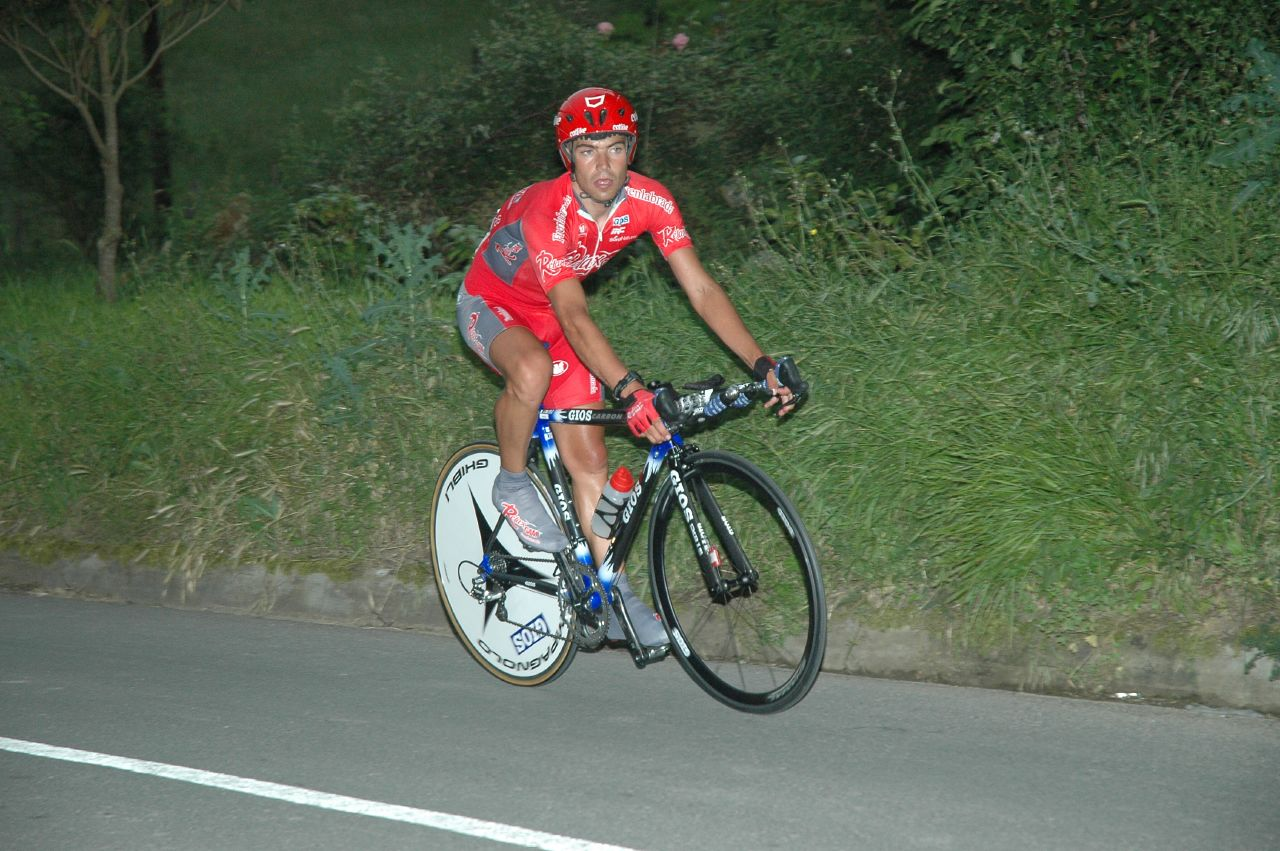

Personal information
- Born: 7 June 1984 (age 42) Campo de Criptana, Spain

Cycling career
- Sport: Cycling
- Current team: Retired
- Discipline: Road
- Role: Rider

Amateur teams
- 2003: Kelme–Costa Blanca amateur
- 2004: Würth–Liberty Seguros
- 2008: Supermercados Froiz
- 2010: Inverse-Murcia (until 28/3)

Professional teams
- 2006–2007: Relax–GAM
- 2009: Contentpolis–Ampo
- 2010–2011: Heraklion Kastro–Murcia

Óscar García-Casarrubios Pintor (born 7 June 1984 in Campo de Criptana) is a Spanish former professional racing cyclist.

== Major results ==
2005
1st Stages 3 and 4 Vuelta a Palencia
8th Clásica a los Puertos de Guadarrama
2006
6th Overall Tour of Qinghai Lake

1st Mountains classification

2008
1st Overall Vuelta a Galicia
1st Stage 1 Volta a Coruña
2010
1st Stage 1 Vuelta a Venezuela
