= Rafael Serrano (cyclist) =

Spanish cyclist

Personal information
- Full name: Rafael Serrano Fernández
- Born: 15 July 1987 (age 39) Tomelloso, Spain

Cycling career
- Sport: Cycling
- Current team: Retired
- Discipline: Road
- Role: Rider

Professional teams
- 2007: Saunier Duval–Prodir
- 2008–2009: Contentpolis–Murcia
- 2010: Heraklion Kastro–Murcia

Rafael Serrano Fernández (born 15 July 1987) is a Spanish former cyclist. He was professional from 2007 to 2010.

== Major results ==
2007
1st Time trial, National Under–23 Road Championships
2010
1st Stage 4 Tour d'Azerbaïdjan
1st Stage 1 Tour de Beauce
