= Javier Etxarri =

Spanish cyclist

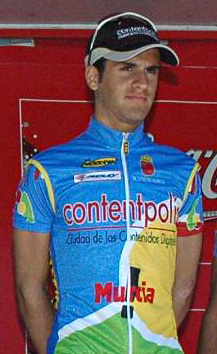
- Etxarri in 2008

Personal information
- Full name: Francisco Javier Etxarri Marín
- Born: 16 August 1986 (age 40) Lekunberri, Spain

Cycling career
- Sport: Cycling
- Current team: Retired
- Discipline: Road
- Role: Rider

Amateur teams
- 2005–2006: Seguros Bilbao
- 2010: Lizarte

Professional team
- 2007–2009: Contentpolis–Ampo

Francisco Javier Etxarri Marín (born 16 August 1986 in Lekunberri) is a former Spanish racing cyclist.
