= Vuelta a Chihuahua =

Mexican Cycling Race

Vuelta Chihuahua International
Race details
- Date: October
- Region: Chihuahua, Mexico
- English name: International Tour of Chihuahua
- Local name(s): Vuelta a Chihuahua
- Discipline: Road race
- Competition: UCI America Tour: 2006–09; Standalone: 2010–11
- Type: Stage race

History
- First edition: 2006
- Editions: 6
- Final edition: 2011
- First winner: Luis Pérez Romero (ESP)
- Most wins: Francisco Mancebo (ESP) (2 wins)
- Final winner: Gonzalo Garrido (CHI)

Vuelta Chihuahua Internacional (Vuelta a Chihuahua) was a stage race held annually in October in the Mexican state of Chihuahua. The Vuelta a Chihuahua was first contested in 2005, as part of the UCI America Tour schedule, and was run over seven stages (days). The Chihuahua's diverse geography, including mountains, forests, and farmland, contributed to the challenge of the race.

In 2009, the UCI upgraded the Vuelta a Chihuahua from a 2.2 to a 2.1 event. In 2010, the Vuelta a Chihuahua was dropped from the UCI America Tour, but was still ran that year, and 2011, as a standalone event. The Vuelta a Chihuahua ceased after the 2011 event.

== Winners ==
Year	Country	Rider	Team
2006	Spain	Luis Pérez Romero	Andalucía–Paul Versan
2007	Spain	Francisco Mancebo	Relax–GAM
2008	Spain	Francisco Mancebo	Fercase–Rota dos Moveis
2009	Spain	Óscar Sevilla	Rock Racing
2010	Kazakhstan	Alexander Vinokourov	Astana
2011	Chile	Gonzalo Garrido	
