= José Luis Caño =

Spanish cyclist

José Luis Cano
Personal information
- Full name: José Luis Cano Losa
- Born: 28 April 1988 (age 38) Tomelloso, Spain

Cycling career
- Sport: Cycling
- Current team: Retired
- Discipline: Road
- Role: Rider

Amateur team
- 2010: Andalucía–Cajasur (stagiaire)

Professional team
- 2011–2012: Andalucía–Caja Granada

José Luis Cano Losa (born 28 April 1988) is a Spanish former professional road cyclist, who competed for Andalucía for two seasons.
