= Julien Loubet =

French cyclist

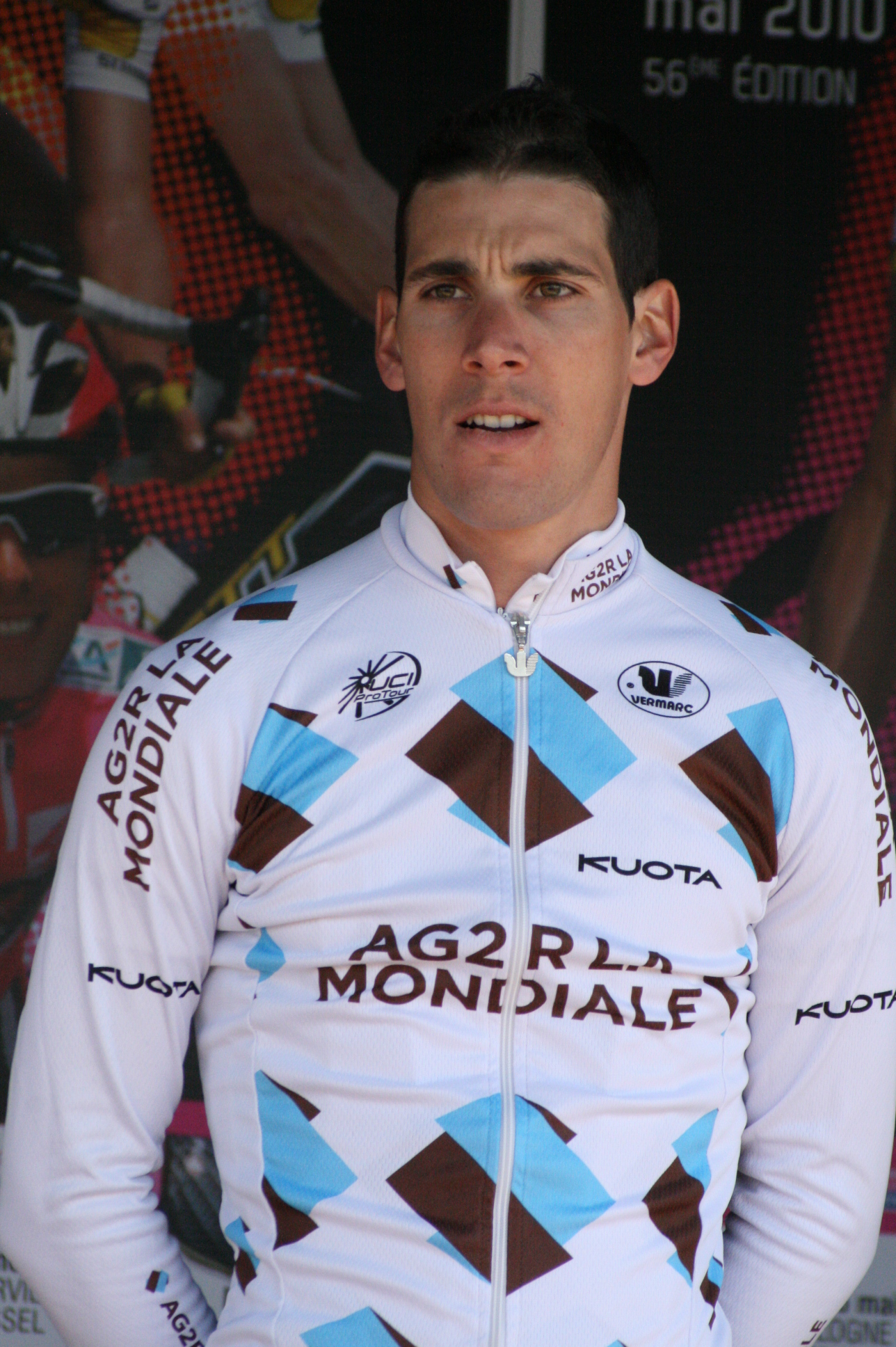
- Loubet in 2010.

Personal information
- Full name: Julien Loubet
- Born: 11 January 1985 (age 41) Toulouse, France
- Height: 1.80 m (5 ft 11 in)
- Weight: 65 kg (143 lb)

Cycling career
- Sport: Cycling
- Current team: Retired
- Discipline: Road
- Role: Rider

Amateur teams
- 2004: GSC Blagnac
- 2012: GSC Blagnac
- 2013: US Montauban
- 2014: GSC Blagnac Vélo Sport 31

Professional teams
- 2005–2011: AG2R Prévoyance
- 2015: Team Marseille 13 KTM
- 2016: Fortuneo–Vital Concept
- 2017: Armée de Terre
- 2018: Euskadi–Murias

Julien Loubet (French: [ʒyljɛ̃ lube]; born 11 January 1985 in Toulouse) is a French former professional road bicycle racer, who rode professionally between 2005 and 2011 and 2015 to 2018 for the Ag2r–La Mondiale, Team Marseille 13 KTM, Fortuneo–Vital Concept, Armée de Terre and Euskadi–Murias teams.

== Major results ==
2003
1st Classique des Alpes Juniors
2nd Time trial, National Junior Road Championships
9th Time trial, UCI Junior Road World Championships
2004
1st Road race, National Under-23 Road Championships
2008
3rd Road race, National Road Championships
4th Overall Vuelta a Burgos
2009
2nd Overall Route du Sud
10th Overall Paris–Corrèze
2010
3rd Overall La Tropicale Amissa Bongo

1st Stage 2

5th Overall Étoile de Bessèges
9th Tour du Doubs
2011
5th Grand Prix of Aargau Canton
2014
1st Overall Tour du Maroc

1st Stages 4 & 10

1st Stage 4 Tour de Gironde
2015
1st Paris–Camembert
1st Mountains classification Étoile de Bessèges
2nd Overall Circuit des Ardennes

1st Stage 3 (TTT)

2nd Classic Sud-Ardèche
2nd Tour du Doubs
8th Grand Prix de la Somme
10th Overall Route du Sud
2017
1st Tour du Finistère
4th Boucles de l'Aulne
6th Overall Route du Sud

1st Stage 1

7th Overall Tour de Luxembourg
9th Overall Circuit des Ardennes
