= Gustavo Domínguez =

Spanish bicycle racer

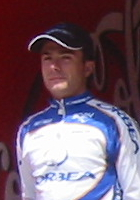
- Domínguez in 2005

Personal information
- Full name: Gustavo Domínguez Lemos
- Born: 17 October 1980 (age 45) O Porriño, Spain

Cycling career
- Sport: Cycling
- Current team: Retired
- Discipline: Road
- Role: Rider

Professional teams
- 2002–2003: Carvalhelhos–Boavista
- 2004: Relax–Bodysol
- 2005–2006: Orbea
- 2007–2010: Karpin–Galicia

Gustavo Domínguez Lemos (born 17 October 1980 in O Porriño) is a Spanish former professional cyclist.

== Major results ==
2003
1st Overall GP Internacional Paredes Rota dos Móveis

1st Stage 1

2006
3rd Vuelta a Extremadura
