= Javier Ramírez (cyclist) =

Spanish bicycle racer

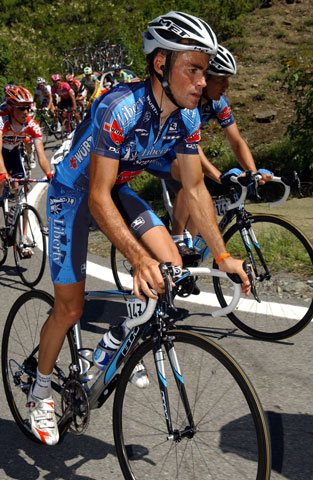

Personal information
- Full name: Javier Ramírez Abeja
- Born: March 14, 1978 (age 48) Carmona, Spain

Cycling career
- Sport: Cycling
- Current team: Retired
- Discipline: Road
- Role: Rider

Amateur teams
- 2002–2003: Avila Rojas
- 2008: Avila Rojas

Professional teams
- 2002: CSC–Tiscali (stagiaire)
- 2004–2006: Liberty Seguros
- 2007: Fuerteventura–Canarias
- 2009–2012: Andalucía–Cajasur
- 2013: Rádio Popular–Onda

Javier Ramírez Abeja (born March 14, 1978, in Carmona, Spain) is a Spanish former cyclist.

== Major results ==
2002
1st GP Macario
1st Clásica Memorial Txuma
2003
1st Overall Vuelta Ciclista a León

1st Stage 2

1st Copa de España
1st Trofeo Guerrita
2005
5th Overall Tour Down Under
9th Circuito de Getxo
2007
4th Subida al Naranco
2008
1st Memorial Manuel Sanroma
2nd Volta a Tarragona
2011
8th Overall Tour of Qinghai Lake
2012
1st Overall Tour of Iran (Azerbaijan)

1st Stages 1 & 5

1st Stage 7 Vuelta Ciclista de Chile
1st Stage 1 Vuelta a Andalucía
4th Overall Tour of Qinghai Lake

=== Grand Tour general classification results timeline ===
| Grand Tour | 2005 | 2006 | 2007 | 2008 | 2009 | 2010 | 2011 | 2012 |
|---|---|---|---|---|---|---|---|---|
| Giro d'Italia | 81 | 86 | — | — | — | — | — | — |
| Tour de France | Did not contest during his career | | | | | | | |
| Vuelta a España | — | — | — | — | 62 | 91 | — | 120 |

Legend
| DSQ | Disqualified |
| DNF | Did not finish |
