= Sergio Domínguez =

Spanish cyclist

Personal information
- Full name: Sergio Domínguez Muñoz
- Born: 12 April 1986 (age 40) Yecla, Spain

Cycling career
- Sport: Cycling
- Current team: Retired
- Discipline: Road
- Role: Rider

Amateur team
- 2007: Soctec–Huevar del Alfarafe

Professional team
- 2008–2009: Contentpolis–Murcia

Sergio Domínguez Muñoz (born 12 April 1986) is a Spanish former cyclist. He rode in the 2009 Vuelta a España, but failed to finish.
