= Pablo Lechuga =

Spanish cyclist

Personal information
- Full name: Pablo Lechuga Rodriguez
- Born: 16 August 1990 (age 36) Jaén, Spain

Cycling career
- Sport: Cycling
- Discipline: Road
- Role: Rider

Amateur team
- 2013: Cajamar-Cosentino

Professional teams
- 2010–2012: Andalucía
- 2014: Euskadi

Pablo Lechuga Rodriguez (born 16 August 1990 in Jaén) is a Spanish racing cyclist.

== Palmarès ==
2014
1st Stage 1 Tour de Gironde (TTT)
