= Julián Sánchez (cyclist) =

Spanish cyclist

Julián Sánchez Pimienta
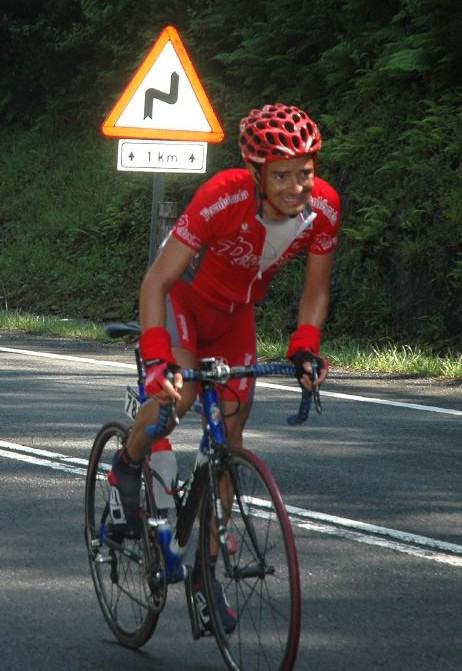
- Julián Sánchez in the 2007 Euskal Bizikleta

Personal information
- Full name: Julián Sánchez Pimienta
- Born: 26 February 1980 (age 46) Zafra, Spain

Cycling career
- Sport: Cycling
- Current team: Retired
- Discipline: Road
- Role: Rider
- Rider type: Climber

Amateur teams
- 2001: Tegui-Galibier
- 2003: Fassa Bortolo (stagiaire)

Professional teams
- 2004–2005: Fassa Bortolo
- 2006: Comunidad Valenciana
- 2007: Relax–GAM
- 2008–2009: Contentpolis–Murcia
- 2011–2012: Caja Rural

Julián Sánchez Pimienta (born 26 February 1980 in Zafra) is a Spanish former professional road bicycle racer.

== Major results ==
2006
3rd Overall Vuelta a Mallorca

2nd Trofeo Pollença

2007
2nd Prueba Villafranca de Ordizia
2009
Volta a Catalunya

1st Stage 4
1st Mountains classification
