= Manuel Vázquez Hueso =

Spanish cyclist

Manuel Vázquez
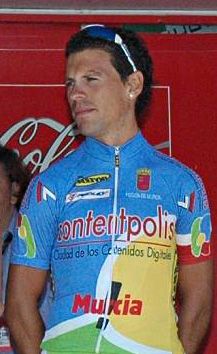

Personal information
- Full name: Manuel Vázquez Hueso
- Born: 31 March 1981 (age 45) Churriana de la Vega, Spain
- Height: 1.7 m (5 ft 7 in)
- Weight: 67 kg (148 lb)

Cycling career
- Sport: Cycling
- Discipline: Road
- Role: Rider

Professional teams
- 2006–2007: Andalucía–Paul Versan
- 2008–2009: Contentpolis–Murcia
- 2010: Andalucía–Cajasur

Major wins
- Volta ao Alentejo (2007)

Manuel Vázquez Hueso (born 31 March 1981 in Churriana de la Vega, Spain) is a Spanish former professional road racing cyclist. On 26 April 2010 he was provisionally suspended by the UCI for a suspected blood doping offense, after being tested positive for EPO on 20 March 2010 in an out-of-competition control. On 14 January 2011 the Spanish Cycling Federation suspended him for two years, starting 26 April 2010 and all results achieved after 20 March 2010 annulled.

== Major results ==
2003
1st Stage 1 Vuelta Ciclista a León
2004
1st Stage 4 Tour of Galicia
2005
1st Stage 3 Vuelta a Tenerife
10th Overall Vuelta a Extremadura

1st Stage 5

2006
Vuelta a La Rioja

1st Stage 3
1st Mountains classification

9th GP Villafranca de Ordizia
2007
1st Overall Volta ao Alentejo

1st Stage 1

2008
2nd Overall Volta a la Comunitat Valenciana

1st Stage 3

3rd Overall Regio-Tour

1st Stage 1

4th GP Villafranca de Ordizia
4th Clásica Internacional de Alcobendas
6th Gran Premio Miguel Indurain
7th Overall Vuelta a Burgos
7th Circuito de Getxo
2009
3rd Vuelta a La Rioja
9th Overall Vuelta a Burgos
2010
3rd Trofeo Inca
8th Overall Vuelta a Andalucía
8th Trofeo Deià
