= Jean Eudes Demaret =

French triathlete and cyclist

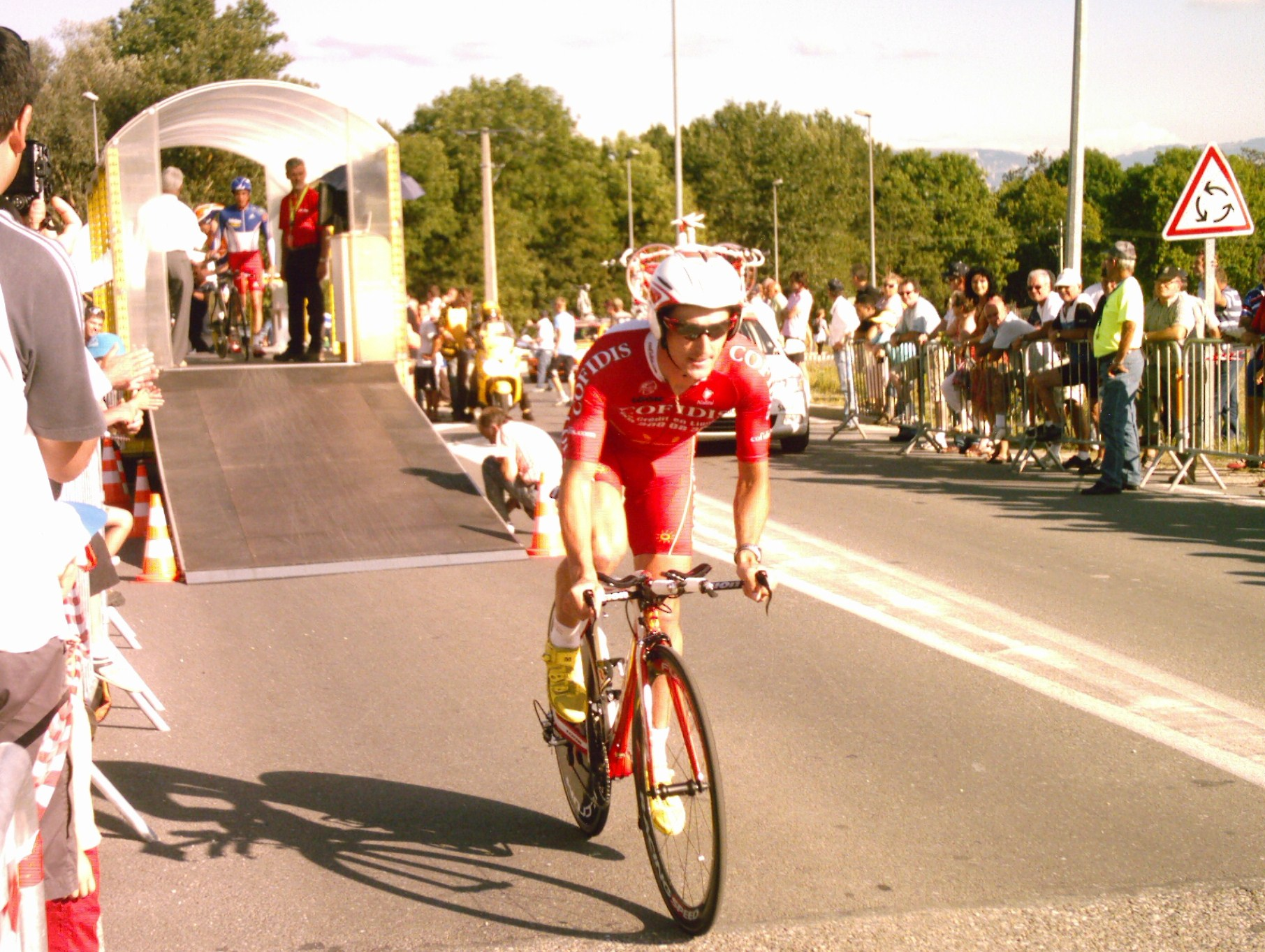

Personal information
- Full name: Jean Eudes Demaret
- Born: 25 July 1984 (age 42) Senlis, France

Cycling career
- Sport: Cycling
- Discipline: Road
- Role: Rider

Amateur teams
- 2006: AC Besançon
- 2007: Française des Jeux (stagiaire)

Professional team
- 2008–2012: Cofidis

Jean Eudes Demaret (French: [ʒɑ̃ ød dəmaʁɛ]; born 25 July 1984, in Senlis) is a French triathlete, and former road racing cyclist, who rode for Cofidis, between 2008 and 2012.

== Palmares ==
2000
2nd, National U17 Cyclo-Cross Championship
2006
1st, Prologue & stage 8, Tour de la Guadeloupe
2007
1st, Prologue, Circuit de Saône-et-Loire
1st, Stage 5, Tour du Poitou-Charentes
2011
1st, Tartu GP
