= José Antonio López =

Spanish cyclist

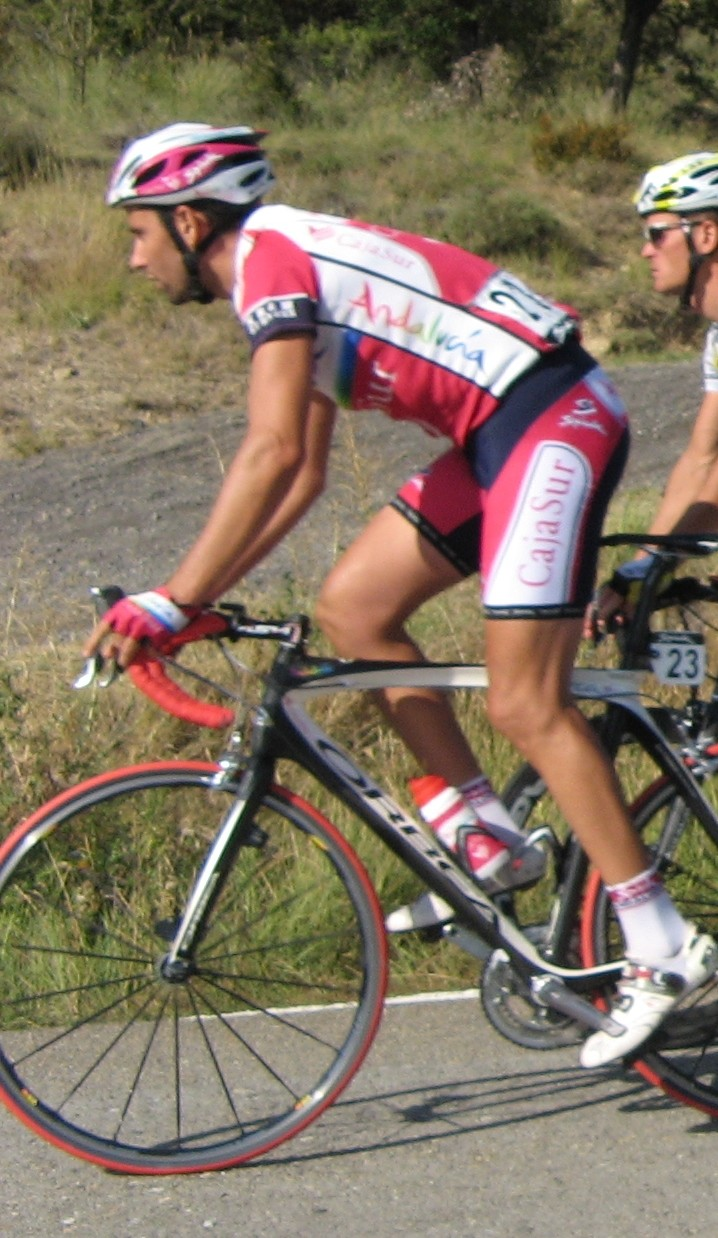

Personal information
- Full name: José Antonio López Gil
- Born: July 11, 1976 (age 50) San Pedro de Alcántara, Spain

Cycling career
- Sport: Cycling
- Current team: Retired
- Discipline: Road
- Role: Rider

Professional teams
- 2003-2004: iBanesto.com
- 2005-2006: Kaiku
- 2007-2009: Andalucía

José Antonio López Gil (born 11 July 1976 in San Pedro de Alcántara) is a Spanish former road racing cyclist.

== Palmarès ==
2002
1st Clásica Ciudad de Torredonjimeno
2003
1st stage 7 Vuelta a Cuba
2004
2nd Memorial Manuel Galera
2008
1st stage 1 Vuelta a Andalucía
