= Xavier Florencio =

Spanish cyclist

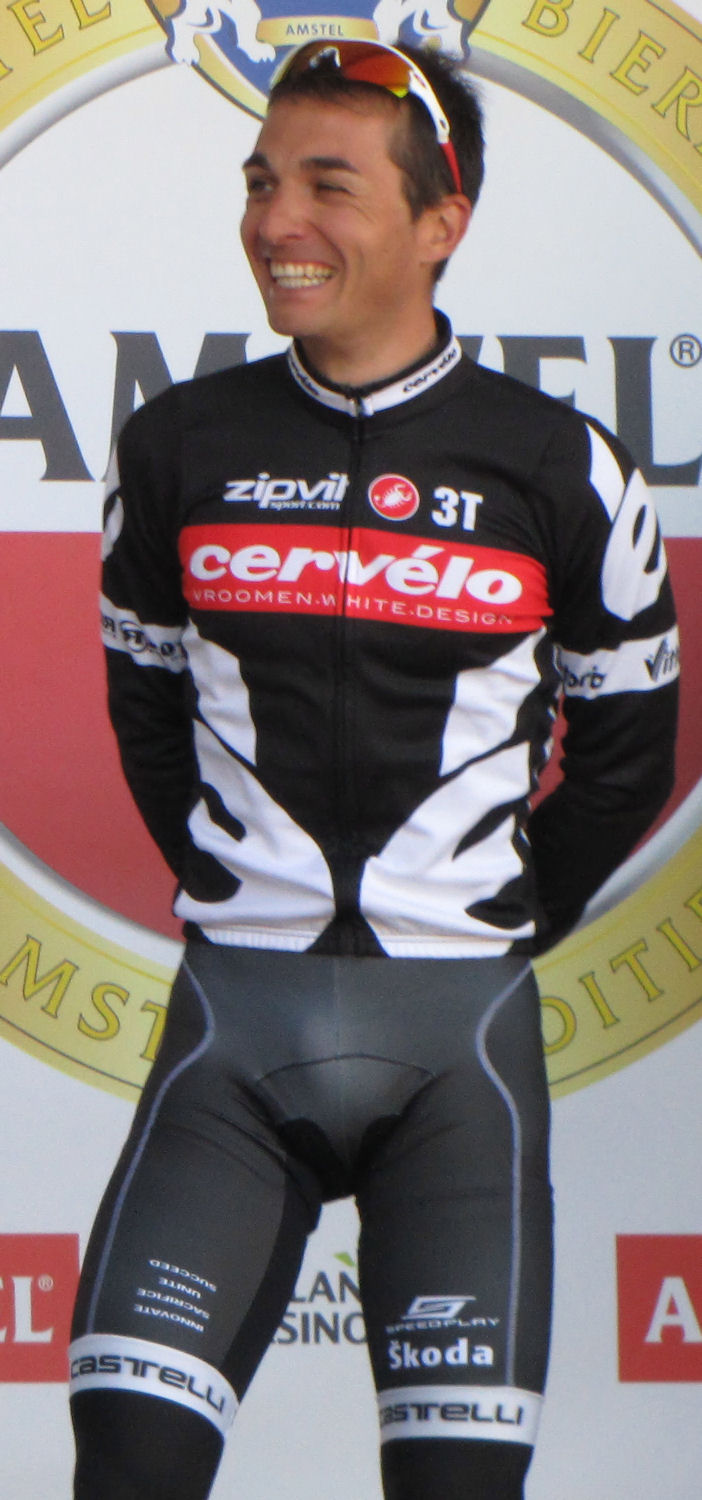

Personal information
- Full name: Xavier Florencio Cabré
- Born: December 26, 1979 (age 46) Tarragona, Catalonia, Spain
- Height: 1.73 m (5 ft 8 in)
- Weight: 59 kg (130 lb)

Cycling career
- Sport: Cycling
- Current team: Team Katusha–Alpecin
- Discipline: Road
- Role: Rider (retired); Directeur sportif

Professional teams
- 2001–2003: ONCE–Eroski
- 2004–2005: Relax-Fuenlabrada
- 2006–2008: Bouygues Télécom
- 2009–2010: Cervélo TestTeam
- 2011: Geox–TMC
- 2012–2013: Team Katusha

Managerial team
- 2014–: Team Katusha

Major wins
- Clásica de San Sebastián (2006)

Xavier Florencio Cabré (born December 26, 1979, in Tarragona, Catalonia) is a Spanish former professional road bicycle racer, who competed as a professional between 2001 and 2013. Over his career, Florencio competed for ONCE–Eroski, Relax-Fuenlabrada, Bouygues Télécom, Cervélo TestTeam, Geox–TMC and Team Katusha.

== Career ==
Xavier Florencio Cabré is an ex Catalan cyclist, born in Mont-roig del Camp (Tarragona) on 26 December 1979. From a family of cyclists, his father José and his sister Núria were also professional cyclists.

At present he lives in Andorra with his wife Xary, who also rode professionally, and with whom he shares his interest in cycling and sport. His two daughters, Lola and Vera, are his biggest fans.

Xavier started as a professional as part of the ONCE-Eroski team in August 2000 in the Vuelta a Galicia, he remained with this team until the end of 2003. He spent the following two years 2004–2005 with Relax-Bodysol and the next with Relax-Fuenlabrada. After his two years with the Relax Team he was three years with the French team Bouygues Telecom and it was there that he triumphed winning the San Sebastian Classic in 2006, beating a group of illustrious cyclists in the sprint, such as Stefano Garzelli, Andrey Kasheckin and Alejandro Valverde.

After two years with the French team he signed for two seasons with the Cervelo-Test Team after their lead cyclist Carlos Sastre requested that Xavier join the team. Finishing with the Swiss team he signed with Geox for a year following that he signed with Katusha until 25 October 2013 when he announced his retirement from cycling due to a health problem at 33 years old and after 13 seasons as a professional. Nonetheless he has remained linked with Katusha as an assistant in 2014 then in 2015 he became their sports director.

He currently remains active in the cycling world as a sports director and operates as an entrepreneur in the hospitality and services sector.

== Career achievements ==
=== Major results ===
1996
1st National Junior Road Race Championships
2002
1st, 8th Stage, Tour de l'Avenir
3rd, Vuelta a La Rioja
5th, GP CTT Correios de Portugal
2003
5th, Ronde van Nederland
5th, Vuelta Valenciana
6th Tour Down Under
2006
1st, Clásica de San Sebastián
3rd, Overall, Tour de l'Ain
2007
4th, National Road Race Championships
9th, Clásica de San Sebastián
2008
3rd Overall Volta a la Comunitat Valenciana

1st, Points classification

3rd Overall Tour du Limousin
2012
9th Clásica de San Sebastián

=== Grand Tour general classification results timeline ===
Grand Tour	2004	2005	2006	2007	2008	2009	2010	2011	2012	2013
Giro d'Italia	—	—	—	—	—	—	—	—	—	—
Tour de France	—	—	—	46	101	—	—	—	—	—
Vuelta a España	90	98	DNF	DNF	36	59	104	—	105	—

Legend
—	Did not compete
DNF	Did not finish
