= Adrián Palomares =

Spanish cyclist

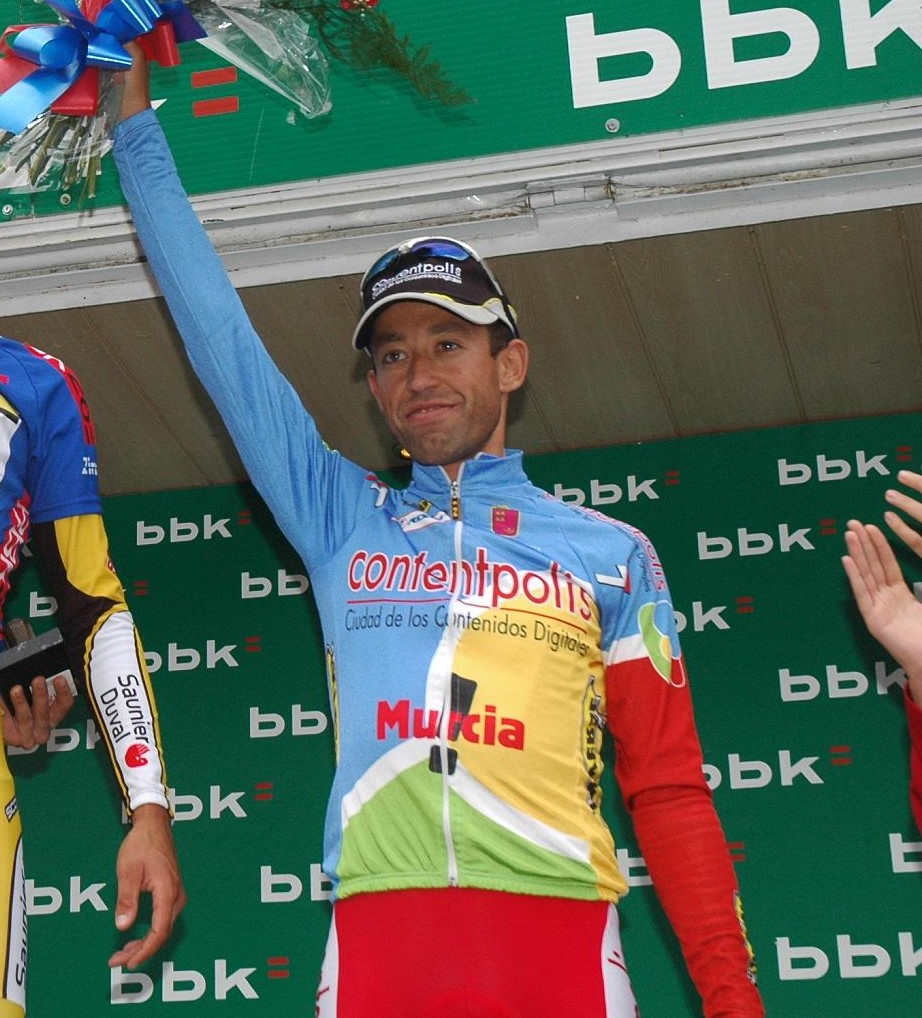
- Palomares in 2008

Personal information
- Full name: Adrián Palomares Villaplana
- Born: 18 February 1976 (age 50) Carcaixent, Spain

Cycling career
- Sport: Cycling
- Discipline: Road
- Role: Rider

Professional teams
- 2000–2004: Boavista
- 2005–2006: Kaiku
- 2007: Fuerteventura–Canarias
- 2008–2009: Contentpolis–Murcia
- 2011–2012: Andalucía–Caja Granada
- 2013: Cycling Team De Rijke–Shanks

Adrián Palomares Villaplana (born 18 February 1976 in Carcaixent) is a Spanish former professional road cyclist.

== Major results ==
2001
1st Overall Troféu Joaquim Agostinho
2005
2nd Overall Euskal Bizikleta
2006
2nd Grand Prix de Fourmies
4th Overall Volta ao Alentejo
8th Overall Clásica Internacional de Alcobendas
9th Clásica de Almería
2007
2nd Overall Tour of Britain

1st Stage 4

5th Overall Regio-Tour

1st Stage 5

2008
3rd Overall Euskal Bizikleta
9th GP Villafranca de Ordizia
2009
1st Overall GP CTT Correios de Portugal

1st Stage 3

2011
10th Overall Vuelta a la Comunidad de Madrid
2012
1st Stage 5b Vuelta Ciclista de Chile
3rd Overall Tour of Turkey
9th Overall Route du Sud
2013
1st Prologue (TTT) Volta a Portugal
