= Andalucía (cycling team) =

Spanish cycling team

Team information
- UCI code: ACG
- Registered: Spain
- Founded: 2005
- Disbanded: 2013
- Discipline: Road
- Status: UCI Continental (2005); UCI Professional Continental (2006–2012)
- Bicycles: Bottecchia
- Website: Team home page

Key personnel
- General manager: Antonio Cabello

Team name history
- 2005–2006 2007–2010 2011 2012: Andalucía–Paul Versan; Andalucía–CajaSur; Andalucía–Caja Granada; Andalucía
Andalucía jersey
Jersey

Andalucía (UCI team code: ACG) was a cycling team based in Spain; the team was managed by Antonio Cabello, and assisted by Juan Martínez as a directeur sportif. The team currently does not hold a requisite licence to compete in professional cycle racing, after the team were rejected a Professional Continental licence – where the team had competed at since 2006 – in December 2012.

The team looked to have a secure future, after the Andalusian government guaranteed sponsorship until 2010. However, they folded after the 2012 season.

== 2012 roster ==
As of 31 December 2012.

Rider	Date of birth
José Aguilar Vega (ESP)	17 November 1986 (aged 26)
Antonio Cabello (ESP)	5 January 1990 (aged 22)
José Luis Caño (ESP)	28 April 1988 (aged 24)
Sergio Carrasco (ESP)	17 February 1985 (aged 27)
Gustavo César (ESP)	29 January 1980 (aged 32)
Javier Chacón (ESP)	29 July 1985 (aged 27)
Pablo Lechuga (ESP)	16 August 1990 (aged 22)
Juan José Lobato (ESP)	29 December 1988 (aged 24)

Rider	Date of birth
Román Osuna (ESP)	15 September 1989 (aged 23)
Adrián Palomares (ESP)	18 February 1976 (aged 36)
Javier Ramirez Abeja (ESP)	14 March 1978 (aged 34)
José Luis Roldán (ESP)	13 November 1985 (aged 27)
Jesús Rosendo (ESP)	16 March 1982 (aged 30)
Eloy Ruiz (ESP)	7 January 1989 (aged 23)
Jordi Simón (ESP)	6 September 1990 (aged 22)
José Vicente Toribio (ESP)	22 December 1985 (aged 27)

== Major wins ==
2005
Circuito de Getxo, David Fernández
Stages 1 & 3 Vuelta a Burgos, Carlos Castaño
2006
Stage 1 Vuelta a Andalucía, Adolfo Garcia Quesada
Stage 1 Vuelta a Castilla y Léon, Ángel Edo
Stage 3 Vuelta a La Rioja, Manuel Vazquez
Stage 2 Volta a Catalunya, Luis Pérez Romero
GP Llodio, Jaume Rovira
Overall Vuelta a Chihuahua, Luis Pérez Romero

Stages 1 & 3, Luis Pérez Romero

2007
Overall Volta ao Alentejo, Manuel Vazquez

Stage 1, Manuel Vazquez

Overall Clasica Alcobendas, Luis Pérez Rodríguez

Stage 1, Luis Pérez Rodríguez

Stage 18 Vuelta a España, Luis Pérez Rodríguez
2008
Stage 1 Vuelta a Andalucía, José Antonio López
Stage 3 Vuelta a Castilla y Léon, Francisco Ventoso
Stage 1 Vuelta a La Rioja, Francisco Ventoso
Stage 7 Volta a Catalunya, José Luis Carrasco
2009
Stage 5 Tour de San Luis, Xavier Tondo
Prologue Vuelta a Andalucía, Xavier Tondo
Stage 5 Vuelta a Asturias, Ángel Vicioso
Stage 5 Volta a Portugal, Antonio Piedra
2010
GP Llodio, Ángel Vicioso
Vuelta a La Rioja, Ángel Vicioso
Stage 2 Vuelta a Asturias, Ángel Vicioso
2011
Stage 5a Rutas de America, Jesús Rosendo
Circuito de Getxo, Juan José Lobato
Stage 4a Volta a Portugal, José Vicente Toribio
2012
Stages 2 & 10 Vuelta de Chile, Juan José Lobato
Stage 5b Vuelta de Chile, Adrián Palomares
Stage 7 Vuelta de Chile, Javier Ramírez
Stage 1 Vuelta a Andalucía, Javier Ramírez
Overall Azerbaijan Tour, Javier Ramírez

Stage 1, Javier Ramírez
Stage 5, Javier Chacón

Stage 5 Tour of Qinghai Lake, Juan José Lobato
