= Contentpolis–Ampo =

Spanish road bicycle racing team

Contentpolis-Ampo
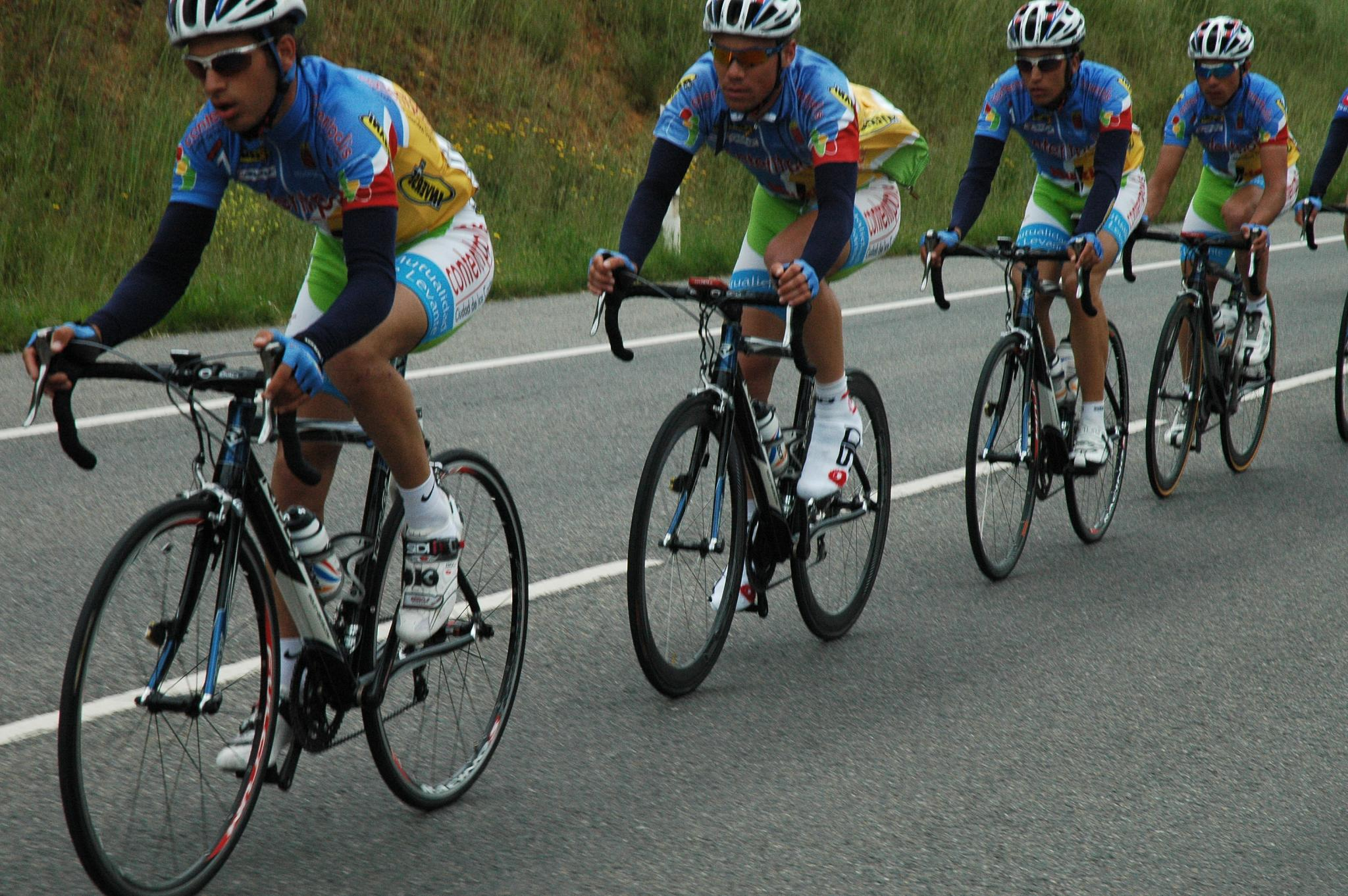

Team information
- UCI code: CNM
- Registered: Spain
- Founded: 2006
- Disbanded: 2009
- Discipline: Road
- Status: Defunct

Key personnel
- General manager: Gines Garcia
- Team manager: Manuel Lopez

Team name history
- Grupo Nicolás Mateos-Murcia, Contentpolis-Murcia

Contentpolis–Ampo (UCI team code: CNM) was a Spanish professional road bicycle racing cycling team which had UCI Professional Continental status until it folded in 2009.

== Riders ==
As of February 8, 2008.

Rider	Date of birth
Jesús Buendía (ESP)	December 28, 1982 (age 43)
Javier Chacón (ESP)	July 29, 1985 (age 41)
Oleg Chuzhda (UKR)	May 8, 1985 (age 41)
Sergio Domínguez (ESP)	April 12, 1986 (age 40)
José Miguel Elías (ESP)	January 15, 1977 (age 49)
Javier Etxarri (ESP)	August 16, 1986 (age 40)
José Herrada (ESP)	October 1, 1985 (age 40)
José Carlos López (ESP)
Adrián Palomares (ESP)	February 18, 1976 (age 50)

Rider	Date of birth
Rubén Reig (ESP)	September 26, 1986 (age 39)
Alberto Rodríguez (ESP)	August 26, 1982 (age 44)
Rafael Rodríguez (ESP)	October 21, 1981 (age 44)
Jorge Sánchez (ESP)	May 23, 1982 (age 44)
Julián Sánchez (ESP)	February 26, 1980 (age 46)
Rafael Serrano (ESP)	July 15, 1987 (age 39)
Eloy Teruel (ESP)	November 20, 1982 (age 43)
Manuel Vázquez (ESP)	March 31, 1981 (age 45)
