= 2009 Vuelta a España, Stage 12 to Stage 21 =

Cycling race stages

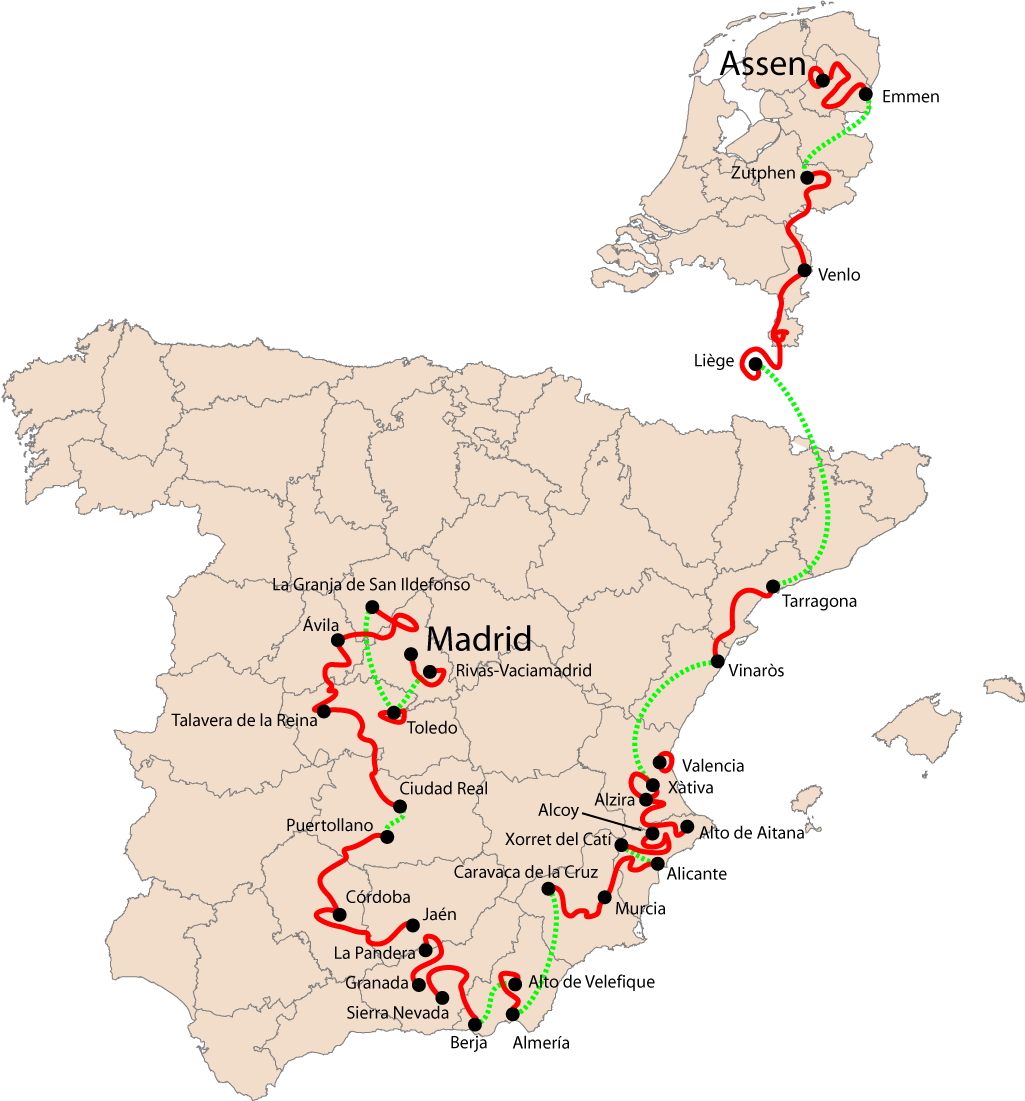
Overview of the stages

These are the individual stages of the 2009 Vuelta a España, with Stage 12 on 11 September and Stage 21 on 20 September.

== Stages ==
- s.t. indicates that the rider crossed the finish line in the same group as the one receiving the time above him, and was therefore credited with the same finishing time.

=== Stage 12 ===
11 September 2009 — Almería to Alto de Velefique, 174 km

Coming out of the second rest day, the peloton gets a course with over 3,500 meters in total climbing. It includes two visits to the Alto de Velefique, one coming after 55 km and the other at the finish line. There is another first and a third-category climb on the day.

Stage 12 results

	Rider	Team	Time
1	Ryder Hesjedal (CAN)	Garmin–Slipstream	5h 34' 31"
2	David García (ESP)	Xacobeo–Galicia	+ 1"
3	Robert Gesink (NED)	Rabobank	+ 6"
4	Ezequiel Mosquera (ESP)	Xacobeo–Galicia	s.t.
5	Damiano Cunego (ITA)	Lampre–NGC	+ 16"
6	Alejandro Valverde (ESP)	Caisse d'Epargne	s.t.
7	Cadel Evans (AUS)	Silence–Lotto	s.t.
8	Ivan Basso (ITA)	Liquigas	s.t.
9	Tom Danielson (USA)	Garmin–Slipstream	s.t.
10	Samuel Sánchez (ESP)	Euskaltel–Euskadi	s.t.

General classification after stage 12

	Rider	Team	Time
1	Alejandro Valverde (ESP)	Caisse d'Epargne	51h 12' 38"
2	Cadel Evans (AUS)	Silence–Lotto	+ 7"
3	Robert Gesink (NED)	Rabobank	+ 18"
4	Tom Danielson (USA)	Garmin–Slipstream	+ 51"
5	Ivan Basso (ITA)	Liquigas	+ 53"
6	Samuel Sánchez (ESP)	Euskaltel–Euskadi	+ 1' 03"
7	Damiano Cunego (ITA)	Lampre–NGC	+ 2' 13"
8	Ezequiel Mosquera (ESP)	Xacobeo–Galicia	+ 2' 14"
9	Daniel Navarro (ESP)	Astana	+ 3' 53"
10	Joaquim Rodríguez (ESP)	Caisse d'Epargne	+ 4' 01"

=== Stage 13 ===
12 September 2009 — Berja to Sierra Nevada, 175 km

This is the queen stage of the 2009 Vuelta. The special-category Alto de Sierra Nevada at the finish is, at 2,520 metres, the highest point reached in the race. But it is far from all this course has to offer – the difficult and steep third-category Alto de Berja comes almost immediately and is followed by the first-category Puerto de la Ragua. The Vuelta has never before gone over the Puerto de la Ragua from this side, and it is more difficult than climbing it from the opposite side. Another first-category climb, the Alto de Monachil, occurs near the end of the stage, though it is essentially just the halfway point to the Alto de Sierra Nevada.

Stage 13 results

	Rider	Team	Time
1	David Moncoutié (FRA)	Cofidis	5h 09'22"
2	Ezequiel Mosquera (ESP)	Xacobeo–Galicia	+ 52"
3	Alejandro Valverde (ESP)	Caisse d'Epargne	+ 1'16"
4	Robert Gesink (NED)	Rabobank	+ 1'17"
5	Ivan Basso (ITA)	Liquigas	+ 1'17"
6	Samuel Sánchez (ESP)	Euskaltel–Euskadi	+ 1'36"
7	Joaquim Rodríguez (ESP)	Caisse d'Epargne	+ 2'09"
8	Cadel Evans (AUS)	Silence–Lotto	+ 2'34"
9	Paolo Tiralongo (ITA)	Lampre–NGC	+ 2'31"
10	Amaël Moinard (FRA)	Cofidis	+ 3'34"

General classification after stage 13

	Rider	Team	Time
1	Alejandro Valverde (ESP)	Caisse d'Epargne	56h 23' 08"
2	Robert Gesink (NED)	Rabobank	+ 27"
3	Ivan Basso (ITA)	Liquigas	+ 1' 02"
4	Samuel Sánchez (ESP)	Euskaltel–Euskadi	+ 1' 32"
5	Cadel Evans (AUS)	Silence–Lotto	+ 1' 33"
6	Ezequiel Mosquera (ESP)	Xacobeo–Galicia	+ 2'06"
7	Joaquim Rodríguez (ESP)	Caisse d'Epargne	+ 5' 02"
8	Paolo Tiralongo (ITA)	Lampre–NGC	+ 5' 33"
9	Thomas Danielson (USA)	Garmin–Slipstream	+ 6' 52"
10	Daniel Navarro (ESP)	Astana	+ 8' 21"

=== Stage 14 ===
13 September 2009 — Granada to La Pandera, 157 km

The riders have one more high mountain stage to go through before making it back to flat lands. Two third-category climbs and several uncategorized rises precede another special-category summit stage finish at the Sierra de La Pandera.

Stage 14 results

	Rider	Team	Time
1	Damiano Cunego (ITA)	Lampre–NGC	4h 04' 23"
2	Jakob Fuglsang (DEN)	Team Saxo Bank	+ 2' 23"
3	Samuel Sánchez (ESP)	Euskaltel–Euskadi	+ 3' 08"
4	Ezequiel Mosquera (ESP)	Xacobeo–Galicia	+ 3' 10"
5	Alejandro Valverde (ESP)	Caisse d'Epargne	+ 3' 22"
6	Robert Gesink (NED)	Rabobank	+ 3' 26"
7	Cadel Evans (AUS)	Silence–Lotto	+ 3' 40"
8	Gonzalo Rabuñal (ESP)	Xacobeo–Galicia	+ 3' 46"
9	Ivan Basso (ITA)	Liquigas	+ 3' 48"
DSQ	~~Juan José Cobo (ESP)~~	Fuji–Servetto	s.t.

General classification after stage 14

	Rider	Team	Time
1	Alejandro Valverde (ESP)	Caisse d'Epargne	60h 30' 53"
2	Robert Gesink (NED)	Rabobank	+ 31"
3	Samuel Sánchez (ESP)	Euskaltel–Euskadi	+ 1' 10"
4	Ivan Basso (ITA)	Liquigas	+ 1' 28"
5	Cadel Evans (AUS)	Silence–Lotto	+ 1' 51"
6	Ezequiel Mosquera (ESP)	Xacobeo–Galicia	+ 1' 54"
7	Joaquim Rodríguez (ESP)	Caisse d'Epargne	+ 5' 53"
8	Paolo Tiralongo (ITA)	Lampre–NGC	+ 6' 34"
9	Thomas Danielson (USA)	Garmin–Slipstream	+ 8' 28"
DSQ	~~Juan José Cobo (ESP)~~	Fuji–Servetto	+ 10' 45"

=== Stage 15 ===
14 September 2009 — Jaén to Córdoba, 168 km

This stage is branded as flat, though it begins at about 600 meters in elevation before descending to the valley below. It also includes the second-category Alto del Catorce por Ciento (which, despite its name, does not feature 14% gradients) 20 km from the finish.

Stage 15 results

	Rider	Team	Time
1	Lars Boom (NED)	Rabobank	4h 12' 56"
2	David Herrero (ESP)	Xacobeo–Galicia	+ 1' 36"
3	Dominik Roels (GER)	Team Milram	+ 1' 44"
4	Leonardo Duque (COL)	Cofidis	+ 2' 04"
5	Maxim Iglinsky (KAZ)	Astana	s.t.
6	Alexandr Kolobnev (RUS)	Team Saxo Bank	s.t.
7	Martin Velits (SVK)	Team Milram	s.t.
8	Serafín Martínez (ESP)	Xacobeo–Galicia	s.t.
9	Alexander Efimkin (RUS)	Ag2r–La Mondiale	s.t.
10	Mathieu Ladagnous (FRA)	Française des Jeux	+ 3' 23"

General classification after stage 15

	Rider	Team	Time
1	Alejandro Valverde (ESP)	Caisse d'Epargne	65h 08' 50"
2	Robert Gesink (NED)	Rabobank	+ 31"
3	Samuel Sánchez (ESP)	Euskaltel–Euskadi	+ 1' 10"
4	Ivan Basso (ITA)	Liquigas	+ 1' 28"
5	Cadel Evans (AUS)	Silence–Lotto	+ 1' 51"
6	Ezequiel Mosquera (ESP)	Xacobeo–Galicia	+ 1' 54"
7	Joaquim Rodríguez (ESP)	Caisse d'Epargne	+ 5' 53"
8	Paolo Tiralongo (ITA)	Lampre–NGC	+ 6' 34"
9	Thomas Danielson (USA)	Garmin–Slipstream	+ 8' 28"
DSQ	~~Juan José Cobo (ESP)~~	Fuji–Servetto	+ 10' 45"

=== Stage 16 ===
15 September 2009 — Córdoba to Puertollano, 170 km

This is the easiest stage the peloton will have seen since Catalonia, with only two early third-category climbs to disrupt an otherwise flat overall profile.

Stage 16 results

	Rider	Team	Time
1	André Greipel (GER)	Team Columbia–HTC	4h 50' 44"
2	William Bonnet (FRA)	Bbox Bouygues Telecom	s.t.
3	Daniele Bennati (ITA)	Liquigas	s.t.
4	Gerald Ciolek (GER)	Team Milram	s.t.
5	Francisco Jose Pacheco Torres (ESP)	Contentpolis–Ampo	s.t.
6	Leonardo Duque (COL)	Cofidis	s.t.
7	Jürgen Roelandts (BEL)	Silence–Lotto	s.t.
8	Sébastien Hinault (FRA)	Ag2r–La Mondiale	s.t.
9	Matti Breschel (DEN)	Team Saxo Bank	s.t.
10	Iñaki Isasi (ESP)	Euskaltel–Euskadi	s.t.

General classification after stage 16

	Rider	Team	Time
1	Alejandro Valverde (ESP)	Caisse d'Epargne	69h 59' 34"
2	Robert Gesink (NED)	Rabobank	+ 31"
3	Samuel Sánchez (ESP)	Euskaltel–Euskadi	+ 1' 10"
4	Ivan Basso (ITA)	Liquigas	+ 1' 28"
5	Cadel Evans (AUS)	Silence–Lotto	+ 1' 51"
6	Ezequiel Mosquera (ESP)	Xacobeo–Galicia	+ 1' 54"
7	Joaquim Rodríguez (ESP)	Caisse d'Epargne	+ 5' 53"
8	Paolo Tiralongo (ITA)	Lampre–NGC	+ 6' 34"
9	Thomas Danielson (USA)	Garmin–Slipstream	+ 8' 28"
DSQ	~~Juan José Cobo (ESP)~~	Fuji–Servetto	+ 10' 45"

=== Stage 17 ===
16 September 2009 — Ciudad Real to Talavera de la Reina, 175 km

This stage was thought to be a hard-fought reward for whichever sprinters fought their way through the heights wrought by the Vuelta's second week – it did not feature a single categorized climb. It was expected to see a mass sprint finish.
Contrary to expectations, Française des Jeux's Anthony Roux was able to hold off the chasing peloton to take the win by just a few meters.

Stage 17 results

	Rider	Team	Time
1	Anthony Roux (FRA)	Française des Jeux	4h 28' 14"
2	William Bonnet (FRA)	Bbox Bouygues Telecom	s.t.
3	André Greipel (GER)	Team Columbia–HTC	s.t.
4	Daniele Bennati (ITA)	Liquigas	s.t.
5	Francisco Jose Pacheco Torres (ESP)	Contentpolis–Ampo	s.t.
6	Jürgen Roelandts (BEL)	Silence–Lotto	s.t.
7	Sébastien Hinault (FRA)	Ag2r–La Mondiale	s.t.
8	Javier Benítez (ESP)	Contentpolis–Ampo	s.t.
9	Enrico Gasparotto (ITA)	Lampre–NGC	s.t.
10	Borut Božič (SLO)	Vacansoleil	s.t.

General classification after stage 17

	Rider	Team	Time
1	Alejandro Valverde (ESP)	Caisse d'Epargne	74h 27' 48"
2	Robert Gesink (NED)	Rabobank	+ 31"
3	Samuel Sánchez (ESP)	Euskaltel–Euskadi	+ 1' 10"
4	Ivan Basso (ITA)	Liquigas	+ 1' 28"
5	Cadel Evans (AUS)	Silence–Lotto	+ 1' 51"
6	Ezequiel Mosquera (ESP)	Xacobeo–Galicia	+ 1' 54"
7	Joaquim Rodríguez (ESP)	Caisse d'Epargne	+ 5' 53"
8	Paolo Tiralongo (ITA)	Lampre–NGC	+ 6' 34"
9	Thomas Danielson (USA)	Garmin–Slipstream	+ 8' 28"
DSQ	~~Juan José Cobo (ESP)~~	Fuji–Servetto	+ 10' 45"

=== Stage 18 ===
17 September 2009 — Talavera de la Reina to Ávila, 175 km

This course has four categorized climbs, three of which are new to the Vuelta. The selection should take place on the first-category Puerto de Mijares, which comes at the halfway point of the stage.

Stage 18 results

	Rider	Team	Time
1	Philip Deignan (IRL)	Cervélo TestTeam	4h 19' 14"
2	Roman Kreuziger (CZE)	Liquigas	+ 3"
3	Jakob Fuglsang (DEN)	Team Saxo Bank	+ 16"
4	Manuel Váquez (ESP)	Contentpolis–Ampo	+ 39"
5	Igor Antón (ESP)	Euskaltel–Euskadi	+ 41"
6	Mickaël Chérel (FRA)	Française des Jeux	+ 42"
7	Rein Taaramäe (EST)	Cofidis	s.t.
8	Rémy Di Gregorio (FRA)	Française des Jeux	s.t.
9	Jesús Hernández (ESP)	Astana	s.t.
10	Jesús Del Nero (ESP)	Fuji–Servetto	s.t.

General classification after stage 18

	Rider	Team	Time
1	Alejandro Valverde (ESP)	Caisse d'Epargne	78h 56' 42"
2	Robert Gesink (NED)	Rabobank	+ 32"
3	Samuel Sánchez (ESP)	Euskaltel–Euskadi	+ 1' 10"
4	Ivan Basso (ITA)	Liquigas	+ 1' 29"
5	Cadel Evans (AUS)	Silence–Lotto	+ 1' 51"
6	Ezequiel Mosquera (ESP)	Xacobeo–Galicia	+ 1' 55"
7	Joaquim Rodríguez (ESP)	Caisse d'Epargne	+ 5' 54"
8	Paolo Tiralongo (ITA)	Lampre–NGC	+ 6' 35"
9	Philip Deignan (IRL)	Cervélo TestTeam	+ 7' 49"
DSQ	~~Juan José Cobo (ESP)~~	Fuji–Servetto	+ 10' 46"

=== Stage 19 ===
18 September 2009 — Ávila to La Granja de San Ildefonso, 175 km

This is the Vuelta's last mountain stage. It includes two passes over the first-category Puerto de Navacerrada, the second of which crests 17 km from the finish. There is also quite a lot of descending to do on this stage, as the four categorized climbs all begin and end at roughly the same elevation. The finish comes on the descent from the last pass over the Puerto de Navacerrada.

Stage 19 results

	Rider	Team	Time
DSQ	~~Juan José Cobo (ESP)~~	Fuji–Servetto	4h 37' 35"
2	Alejandro Valverde (ESP)	Caisse d'Epargne	+ 2"
3	Cadel Evans (AUS)	Silence–Lotto	s.t.
4	Samuel Sánchez (ESP)	Euskaltel–Euskadi	s.t.
5	Daniel Moreno (ESP)	Caisse d'Epargne	s.t.
6	Ezequiel Mosquera (ESP)	Xacobeo–Galicia	s.t.
7	Paolo Tiralongo (ITA)	Lampre–NGC	s.t.
8	Ivan Basso (ITA)	Liquigas	s.t.
9	Manuel Vázquez (ESP)	Contentpolis–Ampo	+ 1' 34"
10	Rémy Di Gregorio (FRA)	Française des Jeux	s.t.

General classification after stage 19

	Rider	Team	Time
1	Alejandro Valverde (ESP)	Caisse d'Epargne	83h 34' 03"
2	Samuel Sánchez (ESP)	Euskaltel–Euskadi	+ 1' 26"
3	Ivan Basso (ITA)	Liquigas	+ 1' 45"
4	Cadel Evans (AUS)	Silence–Lotto	+ 1' 59"
5	Ezequiel Mosquera (ESP)	Xacobeo–Galicia	+ 2' 11"
6	Robert Gesink (NED)	Rabobank	+ 5 ' 30"
7	Paolo Tiralongo (ITA)	Lampre–NGC	+ 6' 49"
8	Joaquim Rodríguez (ESP)	Caisse d'Epargne	+ 7' 42"
9	Philip Deignan (IRL)	Cervélo TestTeam	+ 9' 37"
DSQ	~~Juan José Cobo (ESP)~~	Fuji–Servetto	+ 10' 40"

=== Stage 20 ===
19 September 2009 — Toledo, 26 km (ITT)

The course for the final time trial is flat, with very gentle undulation.

Stage 20 results

	Rider	Team	Time
1	David Millar (GBR)	Garmin–Slipstream	35' 53"
2	Samuel Sánchez (ESP)	Euskaltel–Euskadi	+ 5"
3	Cadel Evans (AUS)	Silence–Lotto	+ 9"
4	Gustavo César Veloso (ESP)	Xacobeo–Galicia	+ 20"
5	Roman Kreuziger (CZE)	Liquigas	+ 30"
6	Philippe Gilbert (BEL)	Silence–Lotto	+ 34"
7	Alejandro Valverde (ESP)	Caisse d'Epargne	+ 36"
8	David Herrero (ESP)	Xacobeo–Galicia	+ 37"
9	Jesús Del Nero (ESP)	Fuji–Servetto	+ 40"
10	Lieuwe Westra (NED)	Vacansoleil	+ 43"

General classification after stage 20

	Rider	Team	Time
1	Alejandro Valverde (ESP)	Caisse d'Epargne	84h 10' 32"
2	Samuel Sánchez (ESP)	Euskaltel–Euskadi	+ 55"
3	Cadel Evans (AUS)	Silence–Lotto	+ 1' 32"
4	Ivan Basso (ITA)	Liquigas	+ 2' 12"
5	Ezequiel Mosquera (ESP)	Xacobeo–Galicia	+ 4' 27"
6	Robert Gesink (NED)	Rabobank	+ 6' 40"
7	Joaquim Rodríguez (ESP)	Caisse d'Epargne	+ 9' 08"
8	Paolo Tiralongo (ITA)	Lampre–NGC	+ 9' 11"
9	Philip Deignan (IRL)	Cervélo TestTeam	+ 11' 08"
DSQ	~~Juan José Cobo (ESP)~~	Fuji–Servetto	+ 11' 27"

=== Stage 21 ===
20 September 2009 — Rivas-Vaciamadrid to Madrid, 110 km

The Vuelta ended, by tradition, much like the Tour de France does, with a flat and largely ceremonial road stage. It ended in downtown Madrid at the Plaza de Cibeles.

Stage 21 results

	Rider	Team	Time
1	André Greipel (GER)	Team Columbia–HTC	3h 11' 35"
2	Daniele Bennati (ITA)	Liquigas	s.t.
3	Borut Božič (SLO)	Vacansoleil	s.t.
4	Leonardo Duque (COL)	Cofidis	s.t.
5	Sébastien Hinault (FRA)	Ag2r–La Mondiale	s.t.
6	Enrico Gasparotto (ITA)	Lampre–NGC	s.t.
7	Greg Henderson (NZL)	Team Columbia–HTC	s.t.
8	Roger Hammond (GBR)	Cervélo TestTeam	s.t.
9	Tom Leezer (NED)	Rabobank	s.t.
10	Paul Voss (GER)	Team Milram	s.t.

Final general classification

	Rider	Team	Time
1	Alejandro Valverde (ESP)	Caisse d'Epargne	87h 22' 37"
2	Samuel Sánchez (ESP)	Euskaltel–Euskadi	+ 55"
3	Cadel Evans (AUS)	Silence–Lotto	+ 1' 32"
4	Ivan Basso (ITA)	Liquigas	+ 2' 12"
5	Ezequiel Mosquera (ESP)	Xacobeo–Galicia	+ 4' 27"
6	Robert Gesink (NED)	Rabobank	+ 6' 40"
7	Joaquim Rodríguez (ESP)	Caisse d'Epargne	+ 9' 08"
8	Paolo Tiralongo (ITA)	Lampre–NGC	+ 9' 11"
9	Philip Deignan (IRL)	Cervélo TestTeam	+ 11' 08"
DSQ	~~Juan José Cobo (ESP)~~	Fuji–Servetto	+ 11' 27"
