= 2009 Vuelta a España, Stage 1 to Stage 11 =

Cycling race stages

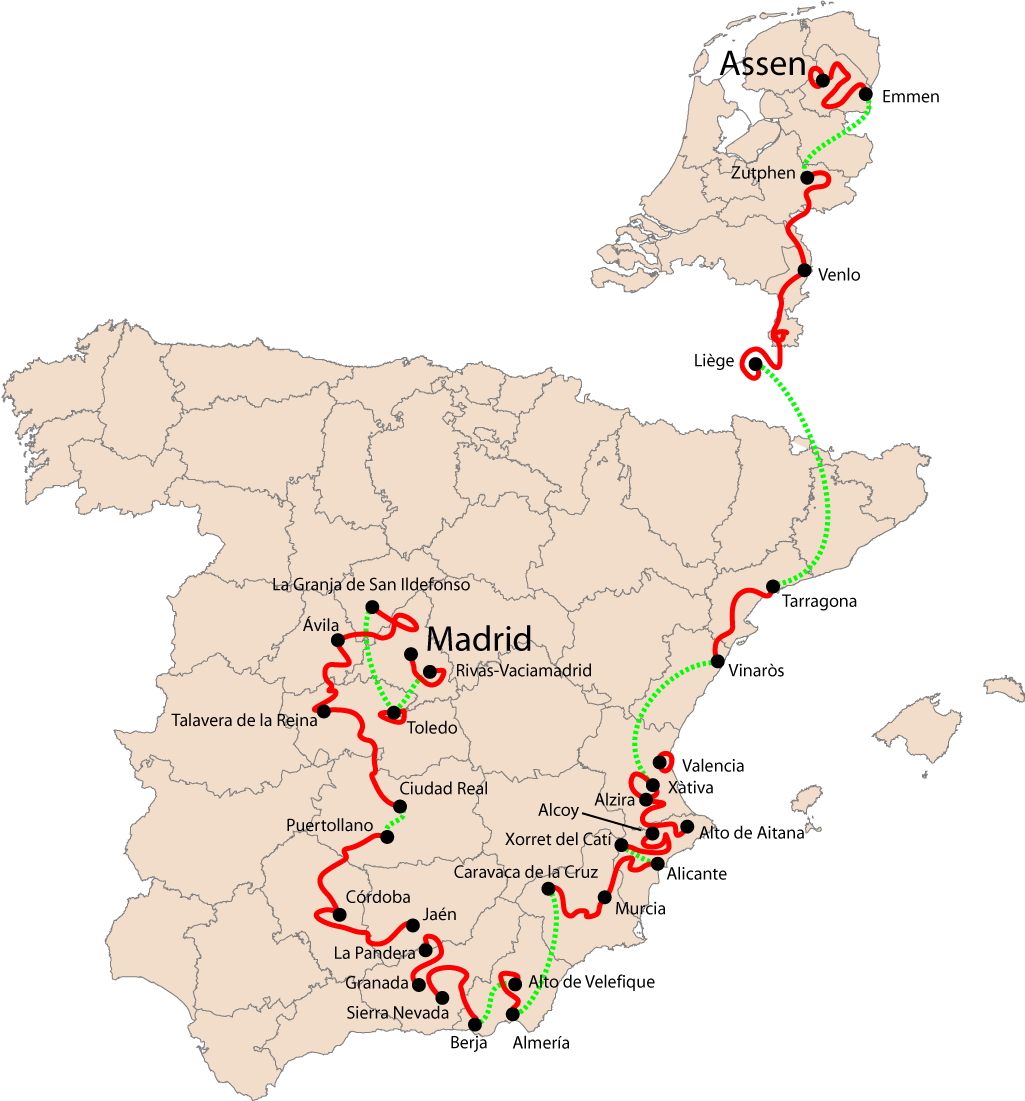
Overview of the stages

These are the individual stages of the 2009 Vuelta a España, with Stage 1 on 29 August and Stage 11 on 9 September.

== Stages ==
=== Stage 1 ===
29 August 2009 — Assen (Netherlands), 4.5 km (ITT)

The course for the first individual time trial was as flat as it gets; there were no rises in elevation whatsoever. The stage was one lap through TT Circuit Assen, a noted motorcycle course.

The early time to beat was put up by Euskaltel–Euskadi rider Markel Irizar, who stopped the clock at 5' 43". His time was beaten by a trio of Liquigas riders who came about an hour after him. For a time, the Italian team held the top three positions, with Daniele Bennati, Roman Kreuziger, and Polish national champion Maciej Bodnar, and they took the lead in the teams' classification after the stage thanks to these results. Around the time the Liquigas trio finished their rides, rain began to fall, making the course more difficult for the riders to follow. It also caused Carlos Barredo to slip and nearly fall, losing several seconds, as he left the starthouse; subsequently, turf was put down over the ramp.

After Tom Boonen and Tyler Farrar in turn posted provisional best times, Olympic time trial champion Fabian Cancellara took the course and stopped the clock in 5' 20" to win the stage and gain the first golden jersey. Cancellara expressed surprise at his win after the stage, saying he had come to the Vuelta mainly thinking of it as preparation for the world championships.

Stage 1 results

	Rider	Team	Time
1	Fabian Cancellara (SUI)	Team Saxo Bank	5' 20"
2	Tom Boonen (BEL)	Quick-Step	+ 9"
3	Tyler Farrar (USA)	Garmin–Slipstream	+ 12"
4	Jens Mouris (NED)	Vacansoleil	+ 14"
5	Daniele Bennati (ITA)	Liquigas	+ 16"
6	Roman Kreuziger (CZE)	Liquigas	+ 17"
7	Alexander Vinokourov (KAZ)	Astana	+ 18"
8	Ivan Basso (ITA)	Liquigas	+ 18"
9	Alejandro Valverde (ESP)	Caisse d'Epargne	+ 18"
10	Maciej Bodnar (POL)	Liquigas	+ 19"

General classification after stage 1

	Rider	Team	Time
1	Fabian Cancellara (SUI)	Team Saxo Bank	5' 20"
2	Tom Boonen (BEL)	Quick-Step	+ 9"
3	Tyler Farrar (USA)	Garmin–Slipstream	+ 12"
4	Jens Mouris (NED)	Vacansoleil	+ 14"
5	Daniele Bennati (ITA)	Liquigas	+ 16"
6	Roman Kreuziger (CZE)	Liquigas	+ 17"
7	Alexander Vinokourov (KAZ)	Astana	+ 18"
8	Ivan Basso (ITA)	Liquigas	+ 18"
9	Alejandro Valverde (ESP)	Caisse d'Epargne	+ 18"
10	Maciej Bodnar (POL)	Liquigas	+ 19"

=== Stage 2 ===
30 August 2009 — Assen (Netherlands) to Emmen (Netherlands), 202 km

The first mass-start stage was also very flat. A fourth-category climb to all of 30 meters in elevation was the race's first. It did not afford any points for the mountains classification, though the first rider past the climb point got the first red jersey.

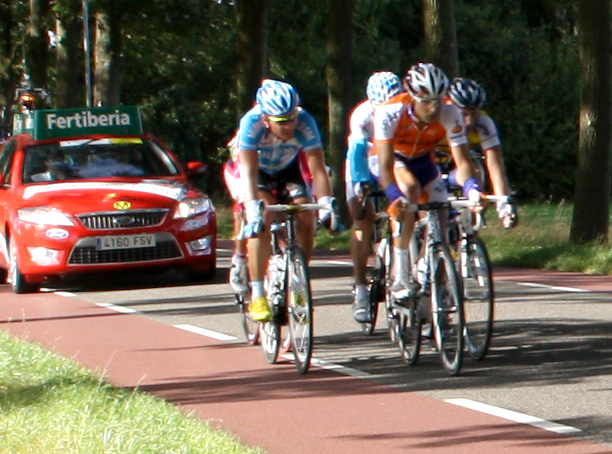
The breakaway in Stage 2.

A five-rider group was away for much of this stage. This breakaway comprised Francisco José Martínez, Tom Leezer, Dominik Roels, David García, and Lieuwe Westra. Westra had tried to make the breakaway to honor his recently deceased father, and his teammates with Vacansoleil wore black armbands in memorial as well. It was Leezer who was the first across the Relus climb to get the first mountains jersey, one that he was assured to hold through the next day, as the Stage 3 course had no categorized climbs on it.

All but Westra were caught with 20 kilometers left to race. Westra fought on, but was caught 9 kilometers later, leading to the widely expected field sprint finish. Team Columbia–HTC did most of the work going into the finish, with everyone on that team but sprinter André Greipel pulling at the front of the peloton in the stage's final 5 kilometers. In the end, Milram's Gerald Ciolek was the winner, at the head of a sprint so close Ciolek himself was unsure he had won. A selection was made in the final 2 kilometers of the stage, with Alexander Vinokourov and Samuel Sánchez notably losing 18 seconds, and other groups who had been with the peloton losing up to and over a minute.

Stage 2 results

	Rider	Team	Time
1	Gerald Ciolek (GER)	Team Milram	4h 43' 12"
2	Fabio Sabatini (ITA)	Liquigas	+ 0"
3	Roger Hammond (GBR)	Cervélo TestTeam	+ 0"
4	André Greipel (GER)	Team Columbia–HTC	+ 0"
5	Tyler Farrar (USA)	Garmin–Slipstream	+ 0"
6	Leonardo Duque (COL)	Cofidis	+ 0"
7	Jürgen Roelandts (BEL)	Silence–Lotto	+ 0"
8	Tom Boonen (BEL)	Quick-Step	+ 0"
9	Davide Viganò (ITA)	Fuji–Servetto	+ 0"
10	Sébastien Chavanel (FRA)	Française des Jeux	+ 0"

General classification after stage 2

	Rider	Team	Time
1	Fabian Cancellara (SUI)	Team Saxo Bank	4h 48' 32"
2	Gerald Ciolek (GER)	Team Milram	+ 8"
3	Tom Boonen (BEL)	Quick-Step	+ 9"
4	Tyler Farrar (USA)	Garmin–Slipstream	+ 12"
5	Jens Mouris (NED)	Vacansoleil	+ 14"
6	Daniele Bennati (ITA)	Liquigas	+ 16"
7	Roman Kreuziger (CZE)	Liquigas	+ 17"
8	David García (ESP)	Xacobeo–Galicia	+ 18"
9	Ivan Basso (ITA)	Liquigas	+ 18"
10	Alejandro Valverde (ESP)	Caisse d'Epargne	+ 18"

=== Stage 3 ===
31 August 2009 — Zutphen (Netherlands) to Venlo (Netherlands), 185 km

The string of Dutch flat stages continued. This course did not have a categorized climb, though it had an uncategorized hill about two-thirds of the way into the stage. The stage briefly visited Germany, and included some cobbled passages, which could have been skipped if the weather was inclement.

The breakaway for this stage comprised Lars Boom, Johnny Hoogerland, and Jesús Rosendo. Though the two Dutch riders were decidedly more familiar with the weather conditions and the roads the course offered, it was Rosendo who stayed out front the longest. The breakaway's maximum advantage neared ten minutes, but the peloton had no trouble catching them, with Rosendo reeled in 20 kilometers from the finish. Team Columbia–HTC set up the sprint in the stage's final kilometers, just as they had all season, but it was not their main sprinter André Greipel who took the win, but rather leadout man Greg Henderson. Henderson was intending to lead Greipel in, but when he did not see the German in the stage's final 150 meters, he sprinted for the win himself, and edged out Borut Božič at the line. It was Team Columbia–HTC's 72nd win of the season.

Stage 3 results

	Rider	Team	Time
1	Greg Henderson (NZL)	Team Columbia–HTC	4h 41' 01"
2	Borut Božič (SLO)	Vacansoleil	+ 0"
3	Óscar Freire (ESP)	Rabobank	+ 0"
4	André Greipel (GER)	Team Columbia–HTC	+ 0"
5	William Bonnet (FRA)	Bbox Bouygues Telecom	+ 0"
6	Tom Boonen (BEL)	Quick-Step	+ 0"
7	Roger Hammond (GBR)	Cervélo TestTeam	+ 0"
8	Wouter Weylandt (BEL)	Quick-Step	+ 0"
9	Stuart O'Grady (AUS)	Team Saxo Bank	+ 0"
10	Jürgen Roelandts (BEL)	Silence–Lotto	+ 0"

General classification after stage 3

	Rider	Team	Time
1	Fabian Cancellara (SUI)	Team Saxo Bank	9h 29' 33"
2	Greg Henderson (NZL)	Team Columbia–HTC	+ 6"
3	Gerald Ciolek (GER)	Team Milram	+ 8"
4	Tom Boonen (BEL)	Quick-Step	+ 9"
5	Tyler Farrar (USA)	Garmin–Slipstream	+ 12"
6	Jens Mouris (NED)	Vacansoleil	+ 14"
7	Lars Boom (NED)	Rabobank	+ 16"
8	Daniele Bennati (ITA)	Liquigas	+ 16"
9	Roman Kreuziger (CZE)	Liquigas	+ 17"
10	David García (ESP)	Xacobeo–Galicia	+ 18"

=== Stage 4 ===
1 September 2009 — Venlo (Netherlands) to Liège (Belgium), 224 km

This was another flat stage, though it had three fourth-category climbs. It visited some of the same roads used yearly by the Amstel Gold Race and Liège–Bastogne–Liège. With this stage finish, Liège is the only city that can boast having hosted stages of the Giro d'Italia, the Tour de France, and now the Vuelta. After this stage, the riders traveled by plane to Catalonia for the continuation of the Vuelta on Spanish soil.

With the three fourth-category climbs on course offering the Vuelta's first mountains points, this was an important stage in which to make the breakaway. Not only would the mountains classification red jersey go to a member of this breakaway, but so too would the combination classification white jersey, as qualification for it would be restricted to riders who had scored points in the mountains classification. The four who made the breakaway were Javier Ramírez, Lars Boom, Dominik Roels, and Sergey Lagutin. Boom topped two of the three climbs in first position to gain the red jersey, while Roels wound up in white. The breakaway's maximum advantage over the peloton was over 14 minutes, but still the peloton easily caught them long before the finish, with some 30 kilometers to go. After several attempted escapes, the end of this stage was again a field sprint, won this time by the man who was denied by a teammate the day before, André Greipel. A big crash caused majority of the field to fall or jam behind, which caused the top seven to be of riders from only two teams.

The day was marked by consistent rainfall, which made the stage's final few kilometers perilous. Many riders crashed, including Jakob Fuglsang, who lost control of his bike and ran into a parked truck. While Fuglsang was able to continue, Charly Wegelius, Chris Horner, and Robert Kišerlovski would all put out before the race reached Spain. Many other riders sustained minor injuries, and the coming rest day, uncharacteristically early coming after four flat stages, was welcomed by much of the peloton.

Stage 4 results

	Rider	Team	Time
1	André Greipel (GER)	Team Columbia–HTC	5h 43'05"
2	Wouter Weylandt (BEL)	Quick-Step	+ 0"
3	Bert Grabsch (GER)	Team Columbia–HTC	+ 0"
4	Marcel Sieberg (GER)	Team Columbia–HTC	+ 0"
5	Marco Velo (ITA)	Quick-Step	+ 0"
6	Matteo Tosatto (ITA)	Quick-Step	+ 0"
7	Adam Hansen (AUS)	Team Columbia–HTC	+ 0"
8	Jürgen Roelandts (BEL)	Silence–Lotto	+ 0"
9	Linus Gerdemann (GER)	Team Milram	+ 0"
10	Thomas Rohregger (AUT)	Team Milram	+ 0"

General classification after stage 4

	Rider	Team	Time
1	Fabian Cancellara (SUI)	Team Saxo Bank	15h 12'38"
2	Tom Boonen (BEL)	Quick-Step	+ 9"
3	Bert Grabsch (GER)	Team Columbia–HTC	+ 11"
4	André Greipel (GER)	Team Columbia–HTC	+ 11"
5	Tyler Farrar (USA)	Garmin–Slipstream	+ 12"
6	Daniele Bennati (ITA)	Liquigas	+ 16"
7	Roman Kreuziger (CZE)	Liquigas	+ 17"
8	David García (ESP)	Xacobeo–Galicia	+ 18"
9	Ivan Basso (ITA)	Liquigas	+ 18"
10	Alejandro Valverde (ESP)	Caisse d'Epargne	+ 18"

=== Rest/travel day ===
2 September 2009

=== Stage 5 ===
3 September 2009 — Tarragona to Vinaròs, 174 km

The first stage in the Tour of Spain to actually take place in Spain, this course offered the first real climb for the riders, the second-category Alto de Fatxas soon after the stage begun. A breakaway had already gained a lead of 4:30 before reaching the climb. The breakaway consisted of Julián Sánchez, Aitor Hernández, José Antonio Lopez Gil, Julien El Fares, Matthé Pronk and Serafín Martínez. The group collected the set of climber's points for the day, with Aitor Hernández collecting the maximum to take the red jersey. On behalf of the sprinters, Stijn Devolder of Quick-Step lead the charge the catch the breakaway group. They were caught with 30 km to go. David de la Fuente and Philippe Gilbert both tried to make a late move at 7 km to go, but the Liquigas led peloton gave them no more than a 20-second advantage. Once the sprinters launched their assault, Tom Boonen looked to have the advantage, but André Greipel overtook him in the last few meters to take his second consecutive win and acquire both the green and yellow jerseys.

Stage 5 results

	Rider	Team	Time
1	André Greipel (GER)	Team Columbia–HTC	4h 27' 54"
2	Tom Boonen (BEL)	Quick-Step	+ 0"
3	Daniele Bennati (ITA)	Liquigas	+ 0"
4	Tyler Farrar (USA)	Garmin–Slipstream	+ 0"
5	William Bonnet (FRA)	Bbox Bouygues Telecom	+ 0"
6	Jürgen Roelandts (BEL)	Silence–Lotto	+ 0"
7	Óscar Freire (ESP)	Rabobank	+ 0"
8	Borut Božič (SLO)	Vacansoleil	+ 0"
9	Davide Viganò (ITA)	Fuji–Servetto	+ 0"
10	Francisco Jose Pacheco Torres (ESP)	Contentpolis–Ampo	+ 0"

General classification after stage 5

	Rider	Team	Time
1	André Greipel (GER)	Team Columbia–HTC	19h 40' 23"
2	Tom Boonen (BEL)	Quick-Step	+ 6"
3	Daniele Bennati (ITA)	Liquigas	+ 17"
4	Tyler Farrar (USA)	Garmin–Slipstream	+ 21"
5	Fabian Cancellara (SUI)	Team Saxo Bank	+ 27"
6	Óscar Freire (ESP)	Rabobank	+ 33"
7	William Bonnet (FRA)	Bbox Bouygues Telecom	+ 34"
8	Dominique Rollin (CAN)	Cervélo TestTeam	+ 38"
9	Bert Grabsch (GER)	Team Columbia–HTC	+ 38"
10	Alessandro Ballan (ITA)	Lampre–NGC	+ 38"

=== Stage 6 ===
4 September 2009 — Xàtiva, 186 km

This out-and-back stage in Xàtiva includes two third-category climbs never before visited in the Vuelta. The course concludes with the Vuelta's first finishing circuit, two laps which end at Xàtiva's Castle National Monument.

Stage 6 results

	Rider	Team	Time
1	Borut Božič (SLO)	Vacansoleil	4h 40' 50"
2	Tyler Farrar (USA)	Garmin–Slipstream	+ 0"
3	Daniele Bennati (ITA)	Liquigas	+ 0"
4	Davide Viganò (ITA)	Fuji–Servetto	+ 0"
5	Tom Boonen (BEL)	Quick-Step	+ 0"
6	Leonardo Duque (COL)	Cofidis	+ 0"
7	Sébastien Chavanel (FRA)	Française des Jeux	+ 0"
8	Cadel Evans (AUS)	Silence–Lotto	+ 0"
9	Marcel Sieberg (GER)	Team Columbia–HTC	+ 0"
10	André Greipel (GER)	Team Columbia–HTC	+ 0"

General classification after stage 6

	Rider	Team	Time
1	André Greipel (GER)	Team Columbia–HTC	24h 21' 13"
2	Tom Boonen (BEL)	Quick-Step	+ 6"
3	Daniele Bennati (ITA)	Liquigas	+ 9"
4	Tyler Farrar (USA)	Garmin–Slipstream	+ 9"
5	Fabian Cancellara (SUI)	Team Saxo Bank	+ 18"
6	Borut Božič (SLO)	Vacansoleil	+ 23"
7	Ivan Basso (ITA)	Liquigas	+ 27"
8	Alejandro Valverde (ESP)	Caisse d'Epargne	+ 27"
9	Cadel Evans (AUS)	Silence–Lotto	+ 28"
10	David García (ESP)	Xacobeo–Galicia	+ 33"

=== Stage 7 ===
5 September 2009 — Valencia, 30 km (ITT)

The first race of any substance against the clock takes place on a Formula One urban racing circuit. It is almost perfectly flat, with only the gentlest of rises in elevation coming halfway into the circuit.

Stage 7 results

	Rider	Team	Time
1	Fabian Cancellara (SUI)	Team Saxo Bank	0h 36' 41"
2	David Millar (GBR)	Garmin–Slipstream	+ 32"
3	Bert Grabsch (GER)	Team Columbia–HTC	+ 36"
4	David Herrero (ESP)	Xacobeo–Galicia	+ 40"
5	Vasil Kiryienka (BLR)	Caisse d'Epargne	+ 46"
6	Samuel Sánchez (ESP)	Euskaltel–Euskadi	+ 47"
7	Thomas Danielson (USA)	Garmin–Slipstream	+ 50"
8	Christophe Riblon (FRA)	Ag2r–La Mondiale	+ 53"
9	Lars Boom (NED)	Rabobank	+ 59"
10	Cadel Evans (AUS)	Silence–Lotto	+ 1'02"

General classification after stage 7

	Rider	Team	Time
1	Fabian Cancellara (SUI)	Team Saxo Bank	24h 58' 12"
2	Tom Boonen (BEL)	Quick-Step	+ 51"
3	David Herrero (ESP)	Xacobeo–Galicia	+ 59"
4	Daniele Bennati (ITA)	Liquigas	+ 1'03"
5	Vasil Kiryienka (BLR)	Caisse d'Epargne	+ 1'08"
6	Cadel Evans (AUS)	Silence–Lotto	+ 1'12"
7	Alejandro Valverde (ESP)	Caisse d'Epargne	+ 1'14"
8	Thomas Danielson (USA)	Garmin–Slipstream	+ 1'19"
9	Samuel Sánchez (ESP)	Euskaltel–Euskadi	+ 1'20"
10	David Millar (GBR)	Garmin–Slipstream	+ 1'20"

=== Stage 8 ===
6 September 2009 — Alzira to Alto de Aitana, 206 km

This is a difficult stage, with seven categorized climbs on course (three second-category and four third-category) serving as a warm-up for the special-category Alto de Aitana at the finish. The course is also longer than most typical mountain stages in a Grand Tour, at 206 km, and figures to be the Vuelta's first truly selective stage. This stage produced one of the biggest shocks of the race so far with the retirement of Andy Schleck, a pre-race favourite.

Stage 8 results

	Rider	Team	Time
1	Damiano Cunego (ITA)	Lampre–NGC	6h 05' 54"
2	David Moncoutié (FRA)	Cofidis	+ 33"
3	Robert Gesink (NED)	Rabobank	+ 36"
4	Cadel Evans (AUS)	Silence–Lotto	+ 44"
5	Alejandro Valverde (ESP)	Caisse d'Epargne	+ 44"
6	Samuel Sánchez (ESP)	Euskaltel–Euskadi	+ 44"
7	Tadej Valjavec (SLO)	Ag2r–La Mondiale	+ 50"
8	Ivan Basso (ITA)	Liquigas	+ 50"
9	Ezequiel Mosquera (ESP)	Xacobeo–Galicia	+ 50"
10	Joaquim Rodríguez (ESP)	Caisse d'Epargne	+ 50"

General classification after stage 8

	Rider	Team	Time
1	Cadel Evans (AUS)	Silence–Lotto	31h 05' 02"
2	Alejandro Valverde (ESP)	Caisse d'Epargne	+ 2"
3	Samuel Sánchez (ESP)	Euskaltel–Euskadi	+ 8"
4	Thomas Danielson (USA)	Garmin–Slipstream	+ 13"
5	Robert Gesink (NED)	Rabobank	+ 29"
6	Ivan Basso (ITA)	Liquigas	+ 46"
7	Damiano Cunego (ITA)	Lampre–NGC	+ 1' 26"
8	Haimar Zubeldia (ESP)	Astana	+ 1' 37"
9	Ezequiel Mosquera (ESP)	Xacobeo–Galicia	+ 1' 46"
DSQ	~~Juan José Cobo (ESP)~~	Fuji–Servetto	+ 2' 03"

=== Stage 9 ===
7 September 2009 — Alcoy to Xorret de Catí, 188 km

The ninth stage of the Vuelta takes place between Alcoi and Xorret del Catí. The stage has a similar layout to that of the previous day: many mountain climbs and a mountain finish. However, this time the climb is not as long and steep as Aitana: Xorret del Catí is a short, explosive climb that requires sprockets of 25 and even 27 teeth.

Stage 9 results

	Rider	Team	Time
1	Gustavo César Veloso (ESP)	Xacobeo–Galicia	5h 21' 04"
2	Marco Marzano (ITA)	Lampre–NGC	+ 21"
3	Alejandro Valverde (ESP)	Caisse d'Epargne	+ 40"
4	David de la Fuente (ESP)	Fuji–Servetto	+ 41"
5	Robert Gesink (NED)	Rabobank	+ 41"
6	Cadel Evans (AUS)	Silence–Lotto	+ 41"
7	Ivan Basso (ITA)	Liquigas	+ 41"
8	Javier Ramírez Abeja (ESP)	Andalucía–Cajasur	+ 53"
9	Joaquim Rodríguez (ESP)	Caisse d'Epargne	+ 1' 12"
10	Thomas Danielson (USA)	Garmin–Slipstream	+ 1' 12"

General classification after stage 9

	Rider	Team	Time
1	Alejandro Valverde (ESP)	Caisse d'Epargne	36h 26' 40"
2	Cadel Evans (AUS)	Silence–Lotto	+ 7"
3	Robert Gesink (NED)	Rabobank	+ 36"
4	Thomas Danielson (USA)	Garmin–Slipstream	+ 51"
5	Ivan Basso (ITA)	Liquigas	+ 53"
6	Samuel Sánchez (ESP)	Euskaltel–Euskadi	+ 1'03"
7	Damiano Cunego (ITA)	Lampre–NGC	+ 2'04"
8	Ezequiel Mosquera (ESP)	Xacobeo–Galicia	+ 2'24"
9	Haimar Zubeldia (ESP)	Astana	+ 3'01"
DSQ	~~Juan José Cobo (ESP)~~	Fuji–Servetto	+ 3'08"

=== Stage 10 ===
8 September 2009 — Alicante to Murcia, 186 km

This stage started high in elevation and undulated a little before a drastic descent about two-thirds of the way into the course. The Alto de la Cresta del Gallo just before the finish kept the sprinters' teams from having anything to say on this day.

A breakaway of 19 riders formed early in the race, but consecutive attacks on the Alto de la Cresta del Gallo produced a group of four that held on until the finish. Alexander Vinokourov, Ryder Hesjedal, Simon Gerrans and Jakob Fuglsang worked together until the finish was in sight. They then came close to a standstill as the leading riders began to jockey for a drafting position for the start of the sprint. Vinokourov was the first to jump, as Gerrans waited patiently behind and was able to hold off Hesjedal and Fuglsang to take the win.

Stage 10 results

	Rider	Team	Time
1	Simon Gerrans (AUS)	Cervélo TestTeam	3h 56' 19"
2	Ryder Hesjedal (CAN)	Garmin–Slipstream	+ 0"
3	Jakob Fuglsang (DEN)	Team Saxo Bank	+ 0"
4	Alexander Vinokourov (KAZ)	Astana	+ 0"
5	Adam Hansen (AUS)	Team Columbia–HTC	+ 29"
6	Francisco Pérez (ESP)	Caisse d'Epargne	+ 31"
7	Christophe Riblon (FRA)	Ag2r–La Mondiale	+ 37"
8	Karsten Kroon (NED)	Team Saxo Bank	+ 39"
9	Arnaud Gérard (FRA)	Française des Jeux	+ 39"
10	Matteo Tosatto (ITA)	Quick-Step	+ 39"

General classification after stage 10

	Rider	Team	Time
1	Alejandro Valverde (ESP)	Caisse d'Epargne	40h 26' 41"
2	Cadel Evans (AUS)	Silence–Lotto	+ 7"
3	Robert Gesink (NED)	Rabobank	+ 36"
4	Tom Danielson (USA)	Garmin–Slipstream	+ 51"
5	Ivan Basso (ITA)	Liquigas	+ 53"
6	Samuel Sánchez (ESP)	Euskaltel–Euskadi	+ 1' 03"
7	Damiano Cunego (ITA)	Lampre–NGC	+ 2' 04"
8	Ezequiel Mosquera (ESP)	Xacobeo–Galicia	+ 2' 24"
9	Haimar Zubeldia (ESP)	Astana	+ 3' 01"
10	Tadej Valjavec (SLO)	Ag2r–La Mondiale	+ 3' 13"

=== Stage 11 ===
9 September 2009 — Murcia to Caravaca de la Cruz, 191 km

This stage sees the Vuelta leave Murcia. The course has three categorized climbs, one each in the first, second, and third categories, and none of which have been visited in the Vuelta previously.

Stage 11 results

	Rider	Team	Time
1	Tyler Farrar (USA)	Garmin–Slipstream	5h 11' 10"
2	Philippe Gilbert (BEL)	Silence–Lotto	+ 0"
3	Marco Marcato (ITA)	Vacansoleil	+ 0"
4	Iñaki Isasi (ESP)	Euskaltel–Euskadi	+ 0"
5	André Greipel (GER)	Team Columbia–HTC	+ 0"
6	Alessandro Ballan (ITA)	Lampre–NGC	+ 0"
7	Enrico Gasparotto (ITA)	Lampre–NGC	+ 0"
8	Christian Knees (GER)	Team Milram	+ 0"
9	Óscar Freire (ESP)	Rabobank	+ 0"
10	Matteo Tosatto (ITA)	Quick-Step	+ 0"

General classification after stage 11

	Rider	Team	Time
1	Alejandro Valverde (ESP)	Caisse d'Epargne	45h 37' 51"
2	Cadel Evans (AUS)	Silence–Lotto	+ 7"
3	Robert Gesink (NED)	Rabobank	+ 36"
4	Tom Danielson (USA)	Garmin–Slipstream	+ 51"
5	Ivan Basso (ITA)	Liquigas	+ 53"
6	Samuel Sánchez (ESP)	Euskaltel–Euskadi	+ 1' 03"
7	Damiano Cunego (ITA)	Lampre–NGC	+ 2' 13"
8	Ezequiel Mosquera (ESP)	Xacobeo–Galicia	+ 2' 24"
9	Haimar Zubeldia (ESP)	Astana	+ 3' 10"
10	Tadej Valjavec (SLO)	Ag2r–La Mondiale	+ 3' 13"
