= 2009 Vuelta a España =

64th Vuelta a España

2009 UCI World Ranking, race 23 of 24
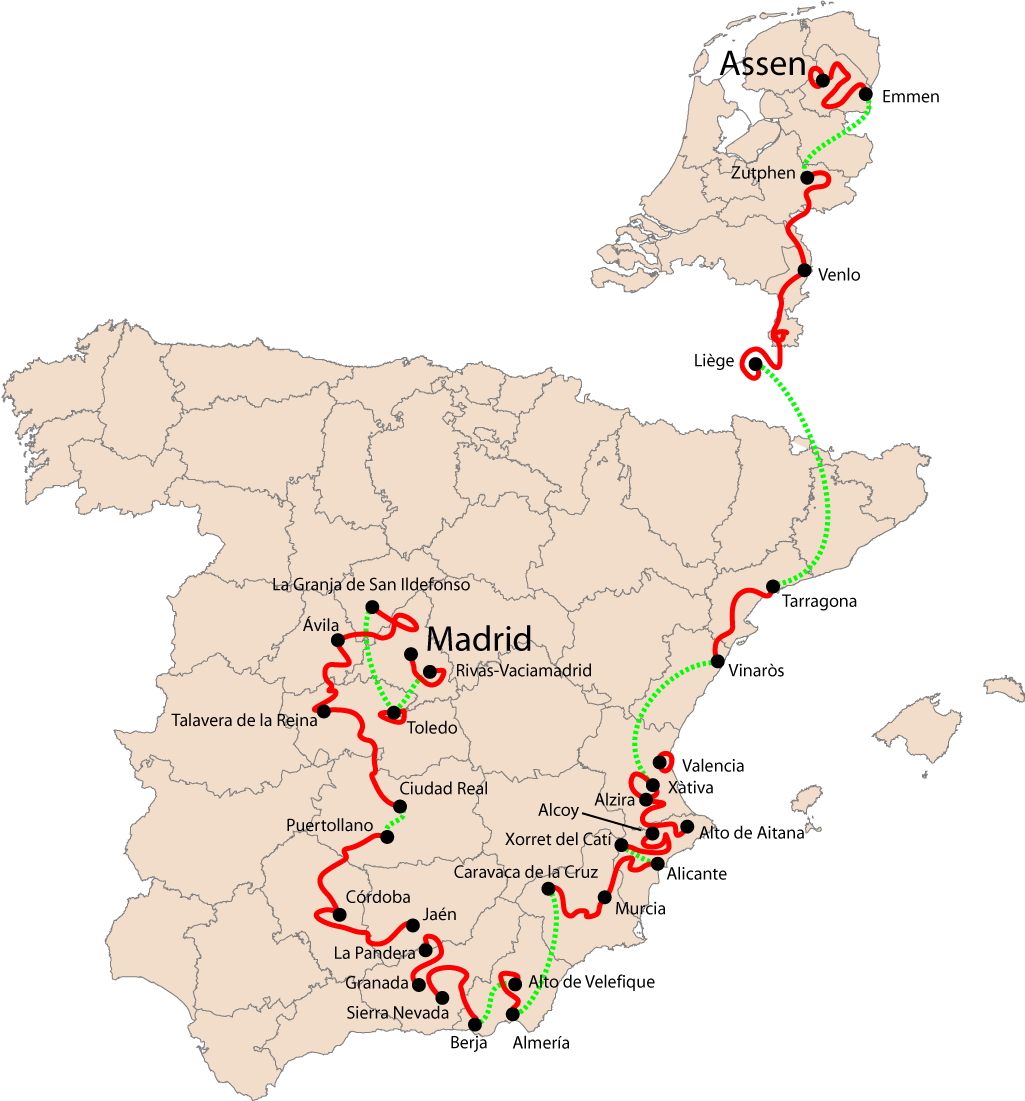

Race details
- Dates: 29 August–20 September
- Stages: 21
- Distance: 3,292.3 km (2,046 mi)
- Winning time: 87h 22' 37"

Results
| Jersey awarded to the overall winner | Winner | Alejandro Valverde (ESP) | (Caisse d'Epargne) |
| | Second | Samuel Sánchez (ESP) | (Euskaltel–Euskadi) |
| | Third | Cadel Evans (AUS) | (Silence–Lotto) |
| Jersey awarded to the points classification winner | Points | André Greipel (GER) | (Team Columbia–HTC) |
| Jersey awarded to the mountains classification winner | Mountains | David Moncoutié (FRA) | (Cofidis) |
| Jersey awarded to the combination classification winner | Combination | Alejandro Valverde (ESP) | (Caisse d'Epargne) |
| | Team | Xacobeo–Galicia | |

The 2009 Vuelta a España was the 64th Vuelta a España. The event took place from 29 August to 20 September 2009. For only the second time in the race's history, it began away from Spanish soil, with the race not in fact reaching Spain until Stage 5.

The 2009 Vuelta has been described as having an easy start and a hard finish. This is because of the short individual time trial and three perfectly flat stages in the Netherlands, Germany and Belgium (along with another in Spain in the race's first week), and eight of the final fourteen stages being mountain stages, with four mountaintop finishes.

The race was won by Spain's Alejandro Valverde who claimed his first grand tour victory.

== Teams ==
29 teams sought places in the race, of which 21 were initially invited to compete. Fuji–Servetto, one of two UCI ProTour teams omitted from the list of invited teams, appealed to the Court of Arbitration for Sport and were subsequently granted the right to enter. Team Katusha are thus the only ProTour team absent from the race.

- Ag2r–La Mondiale
- Andalucía–Cajasur
- Astana
- Bbox Bouygues Telecom
- Cervélo TestTeam
- Caisse d'Epargne
- Cofidis
- Contentpolis–Ampo
- Euskaltel–Euskadi
- Française des Jeux
- Fuji–Servetto
- Garmin–Slipstream
- Lampre–NGC
- Liquigas
- Quick-Step
- Rabobank
- Silence–Lotto
- Team Columbia–HTC
- Team Milram
- Team Saxo Bank
- Vacansoleil
- Xacobeo–Galicia

== Stages ==
Stage characteristics and winners
| Stage | Date | Course | Distance | Type | Winner |
|---|---|---|---|---|---|
| 1 | 29 August | Assen (Netherlands) | 4.8 km (3 mi) | Individual time trial | Fabian Cancellara (SUI) |
| 2 | 30 August | Assen (Netherlands) to Emmen (Netherlands) | 203.7 km (127 mi) | Flat stage | Gerald Ciolek (GER) |
| 3 | 31 August | Zutphen (Netherlands) to Venlo (Netherlands) | 189.7 km (118 mi) | Flat stage | Greg Henderson (NZL) |
| 4 | 1 September | Venlo (Netherlands) to Liège (Belgium) | 225.5 km (140 mi) | Flat stage | André Greipel (GER) |
| | 2 September | Rest/travel day | | | |
| 5 | 3 September | Tarragona to Vinaròs | 174.0 km (108 mi) | Flat stage | André Greipel (GER) |
| 6 | 4 September | Xàtiva | 176.8 km (110 mi) | Flat stage | Borut Božič (SLO) |
| 7 | 5 September | Valencia | 30.0 km (19 mi) | Individual time trial | Fabian Cancellara (SUI) |
| 8 | 6 September | Alzira to Alto de Aitana | 204.7 km (127 mi) | Mountain stage | Damiano Cunego (ITA) |
| 9 | 7 September | Alcoy to Xorret de Catí | 188.8 km (117 mi) | Mountain stage | Gustavo César Veloso (ESP) |
| 10 | 8 September | Alicante to Murcia | 171.2 km (106 mi) | Flat stage | Simon Gerrans (AUS) |
| 11 | 9 September | Murcia to Caravaca de la Cruz | 200.0 km (124 mi) | Transition stage | Tyler Farrar (USA) |
| | 10 September | Rest day | | | |
| 12 | 11 September | Almería to Alto de Velefique | 179.3 km (111 mi) | Mountain stage | Ryder Hesjedal (CAN) |
| 13 | 12 September | Berja to Sierra Nevada | 172.4 km (107 mi) | Mountain stage | David Moncoutié (FRA) |
| 14 | 13 September | Granada to La Pandera | 157.0 km (98 mi) | Mountain stage | Damiano Cunego (ITA) |
| 15 | 14 September | Jaén to Córdoba | 167.7 km (104 mi) | Transition stage | Lars Boom (NED) |
| 16 | 15 September | Córdoba to Puertollano | 170.3 km (106 mi) | Flat stage | André Greipel (GER) |
| 17 | 16 September | Ciudad Real to Talavera de la Reina | 193.6 km (120 mi) | Flat stage | Anthony Roux (FRA) |
| 18 | 17 September | Talavera de la Reina to Ávila | 165.0 km (103 mi) | Transition stage | Philip Deignan (IRL) |
| 19 | 18 September | Ávila to La Granja de San Ildefonso | 179.8 km (112 mi) | Mountain stage | ~~Juan José Cobo~~ (ESP); Alejandro Valverde (ESP) |
| 20 | 19 September | Toledo | 27.8 km (17 mi) | Individual time trial | David Millar (GB) |
| 21 | 20 September | Rivas-Vaciamadrid to Madrid | 110.2 km (68 mi) | Flat stage | André Greipel (GER) |
| Total | | | 3,292.3 km (2,046 mi) | | |

== Classification leadership ==
In the 2009 Vuelta a España, four different jerseys are awarded. For the general classification, calculated by adding the finishing times of the stages per cyclist after deduction of time bonuses for high placings in stage finishes and at intermediate sprints, the leader receives a golden jersey. This classification is considered the most important of the Vuelta a España, and the winner of the general classification is considered the winner of the Vuelta.

Additionally, there is also a points classification, which awards a green jersey. In the points classification, cyclists receive points for finishing in the top 15 in a stage. The winner gets 25 points, second place 20, third 16, fourth 14, fifth 12, sixth 10, and one point per place less down the line, to a single point for fifteenth. In addition, some points can be won in intermediate sprints.

There is also a mountains classification, which awards a red jersey. In the mountains classifications, points were won by reaching the top of a mountain before other cyclists. Each climb is categorized, with most of the climbs being either first, second, third, or fourth category. There are also three "special category" climbs (equivalent to hors catégorie in the Tour de France); these are the stage finishes on the Alto de Aitana, the Alto de Sierra Nevada, and the Sierra de La Pandera. These climbs award even more points than a first-category climb.

Finally, there is the combination classification. This is calculated by adding the rankings in the general, points and mountains classifications; the cyclist with the lowest combined ranking is the leader in the combination classification, and receives a white jersey.

There is also a classification for teams. In this classification, the times of the best three cyclists per stage are added, and the team with the lowest time is the leader.

| Stage | Winner | General classification Maillot Oro | Points classification Maillot Puntos | Mountains classification Maillot Montaña | Combination Classification Maillot Combinada | Team classification Clasificación por equipos |
|---|---|---|---|---|---|---|
| 1 | Fabian Cancellara | Fabian Cancellara | Fabian Cancellara | Not Awarded | Fabian Cancellara | Liquigas |
| 2 | Gerald Ciolek | Fabian Cancellara | Tom Boonen | Tom Leezer | Fabian Cancellara | Liquigas |
| 3 | Greg Henderson | Fabian Cancellara | Tom Boonen | Tom Leezer | Fabian Cancellara | Liquigas |
| 4 | André Greipel | Fabian Cancellara | André Greipel | Lars Boom | Dominik Roels | Team Columbia–HTC |
| 5 | André Greipel | André Greipel | André Greipel | Aitor Hernández | Serafín Martínez | Liquigas |
| 6 | Borut Božič | André Greipel | André Greipel | José Antonio López | Serafín Martínez | Liquigas |
| 7 | Fabian Cancellara | Fabian Cancellara | André Greipel | José Antonio López | Dominik Roels | Garmin–Slipstream |
| 8 | Damiano Cunego | Cadel Evans | André Greipel | David Moncoutié | Cadel Evans | Caisse d'Epargne |
| 9 | Gustavo César Veloso | Alejandro Valverde | André Greipel | David Moncoutié | Cadel Evans | Caisse d'Epargne |
| 10 | Simon Gerrans | Alejandro Valverde | André Greipel | David de la Fuente | Cadel Evans | Caisse d'Epargne |
| 11 | Tyler Farrar | Alejandro Valverde | André Greipel | David Moncoutié | Cadel Evans | Caisse d'Epargne |
| 12 | Ryder Hesjedal | Alejandro Valverde | André Greipel | David Moncoutié | Alejandro Valverde | Caisse d'Epargne |
| 13 | David Moncoutié | Alejandro Valverde | André Greipel | David Moncoutié | Alejandro Valverde | Caisse d'Epargne |
| 14 | Damiano Cunego | Alejandro Valverde | Alejandro Valverde | David Moncoutié | Alejandro Valverde | Caisse d'Epargne |
| 15 | Lars Boom | Alejandro Valverde | Alejandro Valverde | David Moncoutié | Alejandro Valverde | Xacobeo–Galicia |
| 16 | André Greipel | Alejandro Valverde | André Greipel | David Moncoutié | Alejandro Valverde | Xacobeo–Galicia |
| 17 | Anthony Roux | Alejandro Valverde | André Greipel | David Moncoutié | Alejandro Valverde | Xacobeo–Galicia |
| 18 | Philip Deignan | Alejandro Valverde | André Greipel | David Moncoutié | Alejandro Valverde | Xacobeo–Galicia |
| 19 | ~~Juan José Cobo~~; Alejandro Valverde | Alejandro Valverde | André Greipel | David Moncoutié | Alejandro Valverde | Xacobeo–Galicia |
| 20 | David Millar | Alejandro Valverde | André Greipel | David Moncoutié | Alejandro Valverde | Xacobeo–Galicia |
| 21 | André Greipel | Alejandro Valverde | André Greipel | David Moncoutié | Alejandro Valverde | Xacobeo–Galicia |
| Final | | Alejandro Valverde | André Greipel | David Moncoutié | Alejandro Valverde | Xacobeo–Galicia |

Jersey wearers when one rider is leading two or more competitions

If a cyclist leads two or more competitions at the end of a stage, he receives all those jerseys. In the next stage, he can only wear one jersey, and he wears the jersey representing leadership in the most important competition (golden first, then green, then granate, then white). The other jerseys that the cyclists owns are worn in the next stage by the second-place (or, if needed, third or fourth-place) rider in that classification.

- In Stage 2, Tom Boonen wore the green jersey, and Tyler Farrar wore the white jersey
- In Stage 3, Gerald Ciolek wore the white jersey
- In Stage 4, Greg Henderson wore the white jersey
- In Stages 6 & 7, Tom Boonen wore the green jersey
- In Stage 9, Damiano Cunego wore the white jersey
- In Stage 13, Cadel Evans wore the white jersey
- In Stages 14–19, Robert Gesink wore the white jersey
- In Stage 15 & 16, André Greipel wore the green jersey
- In Stage 20, Ezequiel Mosquera wore the white jersey
- In Stage 21, Samuel Sánchez wore the white jersey

== Final standings ==
After stage 21

=== General Classification ===
| | Rider | Team | Time |
|---|---|---|---|
| 1 | Alejandro Valverde (ESP) | Caisse d'Epargne | 87h 22' 37" |
| 2 | Samuel Sánchez (ESP) | Euskaltel–Euskadi | + 55" |
| 3 | Cadel Evans (AUS) | Silence–Lotto | + 1' 32" |
| 4 | Ivan Basso (ITA) | Liquigas | + 2' 12" |
| 5 | Ezequiel Mosquera (ESP) | Xacobeo–Galicia | + 4' 27" |
| 6 | Robert Gesink (NED) | Rabobank | + 6' 40" |
| 7 | Joaquim Rodríguez (ESP) | Caisse d'Epargne | + 9' 08" |
| 8 | Paolo Tiralongo (ITA) | Lampre–NGC | + 9' 11" |
| 9 | Philip Deignan (IRL) | Cervélo TestTeam | + 11' 08" |
| DSQ | ~~Juan José Cobo (ESP)~~ | ~~Fuji–Servetto~~ | ~~+ 11' 27"~~ |

=== Points Classification ===
| | Rider | Team | Points |
|---|---|---|---|
| 1 | André Greipel (GER) | Team Columbia–HTC | 150 |
| 2 | Alejandro Valverde (ESP) | Caisse d'Epargne | 111 |
| 3 | Daniele Bennati (ITA) | Liquigas | 101 |
| 4 | Cadel Evans (AUS) | Silence–Lotto | 99 |
| 5 | Samuel Sánchez (ESP) | Euskaltel–Euskadi | 89 |
| 6 | Borut Božič (SLO) | Vacansoleil | 68 |
| 7 | Ezequiel Mosquera (ESP) | Xacobeo–Galicia | 68 |
| 8 | Robert Gesink (NED) | Rabobank | 68 |
| 9 | Ivan Basso (ITA) | Liquigas | 64 |
| 10 | Leonardo Duque (COL) | Cofidis | 64 |

=== King of the Mountains Classification ===
| | Rider | Team | Points |
|---|---|---|---|
| 1 | David Moncoutié (FRA) | Cofidis | 186 |
| 2 | David de la Fuente (ESP) | Fuji–Servetto | 99 |
| 3 | Julián Sánchez Pimienta (ESP) | Contentpolis–Ampo | 73 |
| 4 | Alejandro Valverde (ESP) | Caisse d'Epargne | 67 |
| 5 | Ezequiel Mosquera (ESP) | Xacobeo–Galicia | 61 |
| 6 | Pieter Weening (NED) | Rabobank | 60 |
| 7 | Javier Ramírez Abeja (ESP) | Andalucía–Cajasur | 59 |
| 8 | Robert Gesink (NED) | Rabobank | 58 |
| 9 | Johnny Hoogerland (NED) | Vacansoleil | 54 |
| 10 | Samuel Sánchez (ESP) | Euskaltel–Euskadi | 52 |

=== Combination Classification ===
| | Rider | Team | Points |
|---|---|---|---|
| 1 | Alejandro Valverde (ESP) | Caisse d'Epargne | 7 |
| 2 | Samuel Sánchez (ESP) | Euskaltel–Euskadi | 17 |
| 3 | Ezequiel Mosquera (ESP) | Xacobeo–Galicia | 17 |
| 4 | Cadel Evans (AUS) | Silence–Lotto | 19 |
| 5 | Robert Gesink (NED) | Rabobank | 22 |
| 6 | Ivan Basso (ITA) | Liquigas | 29 |
| 7 | David Moncoutié (FRA) | Cofidis | 40 |
| 8 | Johnny Hoogerland (NED) | Vacansoleil | 52 |
| DSQ | ~~Juan José Cobo (ESP)~~ | ~~Fuji–Servetto~~ | ~~53~~ |
| 10 | Joaquim Rodríguez (ESP) | Caisse d'Epargne | 58 |

=== Teams Classification ===
| | Team | Time |
|---|---|---|
| 1 | Xacobeo–Galicia | 261h 57' 19" |
| 2 | Caisse d'Epargne | + 23' 43" |
| 3 | Astana | + 31' 39" |
| 4 | Cofidis | + 39' 37" |
| 5 | Fuji–Servetto | + 52' 13" |
| 6 | Rabobank | + 57' 35" |
| 7 | Euskaltel–Euskadi | + 1h 04' 40" |
| 8 | Silence–Lotto | + 1h 07' 04" |
| 9 | Cervélo TestTeam | + 1h 19' 27" |
| 10 | Liquigas | + 1h 34' 05" |

== World Rankings points ==
The Vuelta was the penultimate event in the 2009 UCI World Ranking. The rankings leader, Alberto Contador, did not compete in the event, but five of the top ten did, including the race winner, Valverde, who earned enough points to ensure that the title was not yet decided. Valverde, however, remained banned from riding in Italy, and so did not take part in the final ranking event, the 2009 Giro di Lombardia.

== Vuelta ==
| Rider | Team | Nationality | Stage points | Points for final position | Total |
| Alejandro Valverde | Caisse d'Epargne | Spain | 18 | 170 | 188 |
| Samuel Sánchez | Euskaltel–Euskadi | Spain | 14 | 130 | 144 |
| Cadel Evans | Silence–Lotto | Australia | 10 | 100 | 110 |
| Ezequiel Mosquera | Xacobeo–Galicia | Spain | 12 | 80 | 92 |
| Ivan Basso | Liquigas | Italy | 1 | 90 | 91 |
| Robert Gesink | Rabobank | Netherlands | 11 | 70 | 81 |
| André Greipel | Team Columbia–HTC | Germany | 73 | | 73 |
| Philip Deignan | Cervélo TestTeam | Ireland | 16 | 44 | 60 |
| Joaquim Rodríguez | Caisse d'Epargne | Spain | | 60 | 60 |
| Juan José Cobo | Fuji–Servetto | Spain | 16 | 38 | 54 |
| Paolo Tiralongo | Lampre–NGC | Italy | | 52 | 52 |
| Damiano Cunego | Lampre–NGC | Italy | 33 | | 33 |
| Daniel Moreno | Caisse d'Epargne | Spain | 1 | 32 | 33 |
| Fabian Cancellara | Team Saxo Bank | Switzerland | 32 | | 32 |
| Tyler Farrar | Garmin–Slipstream | United States | 31 | | 31 |
| Borut Božič | Vacansoleil | Slovenia | 28 | | 28 |
| Johnny Hoogerland | Vacansoleil | Netherlands | | 26 | 26 |
| Ryder Hesjedal | Garmin–Slipstream | Canada | 24 | | 24 |
| David Millar | Garmin–Slipstream | United Kingdom | 24 | | 24 |
| David Moncoutié | Cofidis | France | 24 | | 24 |
| Daniele Bennati | Liquigas | Italy | 23 | | 23 |
| Daniel Navarro | Astana | Spain | | 22 | 22 |
| William Bonnet | Bbox Bouygues Telecom | France | 18 | | 18 |
| Gustavo Cesar | Xacobeo–Galicia | Spain | 18 | | 18 |
| Gerald Ciolek | Team Milram | Germany | 18 | | 18 |
| Haimar Zubeldia | Astana | Spain | | 18 | 18 |
| Tom Boonen | Quick-Step | Belgium | 17 | | 17 |
| Lars Boom | Rabobank | Netherlands | 16 | | 16 |
| Jakob Fuglsang | Team Saxo Bank | Denmark | 16 | | 16 |
| Simon Gerrans | Cervélo TestTeam | Australia | 16 | | 16 |
| Greg Henderson | Team Columbia–HTC | New Zealand | 16 | | 16 |
| Anthony Roux | Française des Jeux | France | 16 | | 16 |
| Manuel Vázquez | Contentpolis-Ampo | Spain | 2 | 14 | 16 |
| Vasil Kiryienka | Caisse d'Epargne | Belarus | 1 | 10 | 11 |
| David Herrero | Xacobeo–Galicia | Spain | 10 | | 10 |
| Roman Kreuziger | Liquigas | Czech Republic | 9 | | 9 |
| David García | Xacobeo–Galicia | Spain | 8 | | 8 |
| Philippe Gilbert | Silence–Lotto | Belgium | 8 | | 8 |
| Bert Grabsch | Team Columbia–HTC | Germany | 8 | | 8 |
| Marco Marzano | Lampre–NGC | Italy | 8 | | 8 |
| Fabio Sabatini | Liquigas | Italy | 8 | | 8 |
| Sylwester Szmyd | Liquigas | Poland | | 8 | 8 |
| Wouter Weylandt | Quick-Step | Belgium | 8 | | 8 |
| Amaël Moinard | Cofidis | France | | 6 | 6 |
| Roger Hammond | Cervélo TestTeam | United Kingdom | 4 | | 4 |
| Leonardo Duque | Cofidis | Colombia | 4 | | 4 |
| Óscar Freire | Rabobank | Spain | 4 | | 4 |
| Jesús Hernández | Astana | Spain | | 4 | 4 |
| Marco Marcato | Vacansoleil | Italy | 4 | | 4 |
| Dominik Roels | Team Milram | Germany | 4 | | 4 |
| David de la Fuente | Fuji–Servetto | Spain | 2 | | 2 |
| Kevin De Weert | Quick-Step | Belgium | | 2 | 2 |
| Iñaki Isasi | Euskaltel–Euskadi | Spain | 2 | | 2 |
| Jens Mouris | Vacansoleil | Netherlands | 2 | | 2 |
| Francisco José Pacheco | Contentpolis-Ampo | Spain | 2 | | 2 |
| Marcel Sieberg | Team Columbia–HTC | Germany | 2 | | 2 |
| Davide Viganò | Fuji–Servetto | Italy | 2 | | 2 |
| Alexander Vinokourov | Astana | Kazakhstan | 2 | | 2 |
| Igor Antón | Euskaltel–Euskadi | Spain | 1 | | 1 |
| Adam Hansen | Team Columbia–HTC | Australia | 1 | | 1 |
| Sébastien Hinault | Ag2r–La Mondiale | France | 1 | | 1 |
| Maxim Iglinsky | Astana | Kazakhstan | 1 | | 1 |
| Marco Velo | Quick-Step | Italy | 1 | | 1 |
