= 2009 Tour of Turkey =

Race details
- Dates: 12–19 April 2009
- Stages: 8
- Distance: 1,212.0 km (753.1 mi)
- Winning time: 29h 19' 32"

Results
Jersey awarded to the overall winner	Winner	Daryl Impey (RSA)	(Barloworld)
	Second	Davide Malacarne (ITA)	(Quick-Step)
	Third	David García (ESP)	(Xacobeo–Galicia)
Jersey awarded to the points classification winner	Points	Daryl Impey (RSA)	(Barloworld)
Jersey awarded to the mountains classification winner	Mountains	Gonzalo Rabuñal (ESP)	(Xacobeo–Galicia)
Jersey awarded to the sprints classification winner	Sprints	Alessandro Fantini (ITA)	(Acqua & Sapone–Caffè Mokambo)
	Team	Barloworld	

The 2009 Tour of Turkey is the 45th edition of professional road bicycle racing Tour of Turkey.

== Stages ==

=== Stage 1 ===
12 April 2009: Istanbul, 142 km

Stage 1 results

	Cyclist	Team	Time
1	Mauro Finetto (ITA)	CSF Group–Navigare	3h 35' 14"
2	Mauro Abel Richeze (ARG)	CSF Group–Navigare	at 2"
3	Ruggero Marzoli (ITA)	Acqua & Sapone	s.t.

General Classification after Stage 1

	Cyclist	Team	Time
1	Mauro Finetto (ITA)	CSF Group–Navigare	3h 35' 04"
2	Mauro Abel Richeze (ARG)	CSF Group–Navigare	at 6"
3	Ruggero Marzoli (ITA)	Acqua & Sapone	at 8"

=== Stage 2 ===
13 April 2009: İzmir > Kuşadası, 132.5 km

Stage 2 results

	Cyclist	Team	Time
1	David García Dapena (ESP)	Xacobeo–Galicia	3h 24' 11"
2	André Schulze (GER)	PSK Whirlpool–Author	at 3"
3	Sébastian Siedler (GER)	Vorarlberg-Corratec	s.t.

General Classification after Stage 2

	Cyclist	Team	Time
1	Mauro Finetto (ITA)	CSF Group–Navigare	6h 59' 18"
2	Mauro Abel Richeze (ARG)	CSF Group–Navigare	at 6"
3	David García Dapena (ESP)	Xacobeo–Galicia	at 8"

=== Stage 3 ===
14 April 2009: Kuşadası > Bodrum, 166.1 km

Stage 3 results

	Cyclist	Team	Time
1	André Schulze (GER)	PSK Whirlpool–Author	4h 24' 05"
2	Giuseppe Palumbo (ITA)	Acqua & Sapone	s.t.
3	Daryl Impey (RSA)	Barloworld	s.t.

General Classification after Stage 3

	Cyclist	Team	Time
1	Mauro Finetto (ITA)	CSF Group–Navigare	11h 23' 23"
2	Mauro Abel Richeze (ARG)	CSF Group–Navigare	at 6"
3	David García Dapena (ESP)	Xacobeo–Galicia	at 8"

=== Stage 4 ===
15 April 2009: Bodrum > Marmaris, 166.9 km

Stage 4 results

	Cyclist	Team	Time
1	Daryl Impey (RSA)	Barloworld	4h 07' 16"
2	Davide Malacarne (ITA)	Quick-Step	s.t.
3	David Loosli (SWI)	Lampre–NGC	s.t.

General Classification after Stage 4

	Cyclist	Team	Time
1	David Loosli (SWI)	Lampre–NGC	15h 30' 47"
2	Daryl Impey (RSA)	Barloworld	at 2"
3	Pieter Jacobs (BEL)	Silence–Lotto	at 4"

=== Stage 5 ===
16 April 2009: Marmaris > Fethiye, 130 km

Stage 5 results

	Cyclist	Team	Time
1	Olivier Kaisen (BEL)	Silence–Lotto	3h 15' 52"
2	Alessandro Fantini (ITA)	Acqua & Sapone	s.t.
3	Diego Caccia (ITA)	Barloworld	s.t.

General Classification after Stage 5

	Cyclist	Team	Time
1	David Loosli (SWI)	Lampre–NGC	18h 55' 36"
2	Daryl Impey (RSA)	Barloworld	at 2"
3	Davide Malacarne (ITA)	Quick-Step	at 3"

=== Stage 6 ===
17 April 2009: Fethiye > Finike, 194 km

Stage 6 results

	Cyclist	Team	Time
1	Mauro Finetto (ITA)	CSF Group–Navigare	4h 24' 32"
2	Danilo Hondo (GER)	PSK Whirlpool–Author	s.t.
3	Diego Milán Jiménez (ESP)	Acqua & Sapone	s.t.

General Classification after Stage 6

	Cyclist	Team	Time
1	Daryl Impey (RSA)	Barloworld	23h 20' 09"
2	Davide Malacarne (ITA)	Quick-Step	at 1"
3	Pieter Jacobs (BEL)	Silence–Lotto	at 2"

=== Stage 7 ===
18 April 2009: Finike > Antalya, 114.5 km

Stage 7 results

	Cyclist	Team	Time
1	Robert Förster (GER)	Team Milram	2h 34' 29"
2	Daniel Schorn (AUT)	Elk Haus	s.t.
3	Marco Frapporti (ITA)	CSF Group–Navigare	s.t.

General Classification after Stage 7

	Cyclist	Team	Time
1	Daryl Impey (RSA)	Barloworld	25h 54' 38"
2	Davide Malacarne (ITA)	Quick-Step	at 1"
3	David García (ESP)	Xacobeo–Galicia	at 3"

=== Stage 8 ===
19 April 2009: Antalya > Alanya, 166 km

Stage 8 results

	Cyclist	Team	Time
1	Sebastian Siedler (GER)	Vorarlberg–Corratec	3h 24' 54"
2	Michael Van Staeyen (BEL)	Rabobank Continental Team	s.t.
3	André Schulze (GER)	PSK Whirlpool–Author	s.t.

General Classification after Stage 8

	Cyclist	Team	Time
1	Daryl Impey (RSA)	Barloworld	29h 19' 32"
2	Davide Malacarne (ITA)	Quick-Step	at 1"
3	David García (ESP)	Xacobeo–Galicia	at 3"

== General classification ==
	Cyclist	Team	Time
1	Daryl Impey (RSA)	Barloworld	29h 19' 32"
2	Davide Malacarne (ITA)	Quick-Step	+1"
3	David García (ESP)	Xacobeo–Galicia	+3"
4	Gustavo César (ESP)	Xacobeo–Galicia	+10"
5	Diego Milán (ESP)	Acqua & Sapone–Caffè Mokambo	+1' 42"
6	Mauro Finetto (ITA)	CSF Group–Navigare	s.t.
7	Ruggero Marzoli (ITA)	Acqua & Sapone–Caffè Mokambo	+1' 45"
8	Marco Frapporti (ITA)	CSF Group–Navigare	+1' 54"
9	Martijn Keizer (NED)	Rabobank Continental Team	+4' 02"
10	Pieter Jacobs (BEL)	Silence–Lotto	+4' 20"
