= 2008 Tour of the Basque Country =

2008 UCI ProTour, race 3 of 15

Race details
- Dates: 7 April–12 April
- Stages: 6
- Distance: 838 km (520.7 mi)
- Winning time: 21h 03' 59"

Results
Jersey awarded to the overall winner	Winner	Alberto Contador (ESP)	(Astana)
	Second	Cadel Evans (AUS)	(Silence–Lotto)
	Third	Damiano Cunego (ITA)	(Lampre)
Jersey awarded to the points classification winner	Points	Damiano Cunego (ITA)	(Lampre)
Jersey awarded to the mountains classification winner	Mountains	Egoi Martínez (ESP)	(Euskaltel–Euskadi)
	Sprints	Iban Mayoz (ESP)	(Karpin–Galicia)
	Team	(Netherlands) Rabobank	

The 2008 Tour of the Basque Country, the 65th edition of the Tour of the Basque Country stage cycling race, took place from 7 April to 12 April 2008. It was won by Spanish rider Alberto Contador of Astana.

== Stages ==
=== Stage 1 ===
7 April 2008 - Legazpi to Legazpi, 137 km (85 mi)

Stage 1 Results

	Cyclist	Team	Time
1	Alberto Contador (ESP)	Astana	3h 39' 22"
2	Ezequiel Mosquera (ESP)	Karpin–Galicia	+ 3"
3	David Herrero (ESP)	Karpin–Galicia	+ 8"
4	Damiano Cunego (ITA)	Lampre	+ 8"
5	Riccardo Riccò (ITA)	Saunier Duval–Scott	+ 8"

General Classification after Stage 1

	Cyclist	Team	Time
1	Alberto Contador (ESP)	Astana	3h 39' 22"
2	Ezequiel Mosquera (ESP)	Karpin–Galicia	+ 3"
3	David Herrero (ESP)	Karpin–Galicia	+ 8"
4	Damiano Cunego (ITA)	Lampre	+ 8"
5	Riccardo Riccò (ITA)	Saunier Duval–Scott	+ 8"

=== Stage 2 ===
8 April 2008 - Legazpi to Erandio, 153 km (95 mi)

Stage 2 Results

	Cyclist	Team	Time
1	Kim Kirchen (LUX)	Team High Road	3h 40' 42"
2	Paolo Bettini (ITA)	Quick-Step	s.t.
3	David Herrero (ESP)	Karpin–Galicia	s.t.
4	Rinaldo Nocentini (ITA)	Ag2r–La Mondiale	s.t.
5	Damiano Cunego (ITA)	Lampre	s.t.

General Classification after Stage 2

	Cyclist	Team	Time
1	Alberto Contador (ESP)	Astana	7h 20' 04"
2	Ezequiel Mosquera (ESP)	Karpin–Galicia	+ 3"
3	David Herrero (ESP)	Karpin–Galicia	+ 8"
4	Damiano Cunego (ITA)	Lampre	+ 8"
5	Peter Velits (SVK)	Team Milram	+ 8"

=== Stage 3 ===
9 April 2008 - Erandio to Viana, 195 km (121 mi)

Stage 3 Results

	Cyclist	Team	Time
1	David Herrero (ESP)	Karpin–Galicia	4h 54' 24"
2	Luis León Sánchez (ESP)	Caisse d'Epargne	s.t.
3	Paolo Bettini (ITA)	Quick-Step	s.t.
4	Leonardo Duque (COL)	Cofidis	s.t.
5	Michael Albasini (SUI)	Liquigas	s.t.

General Classification after Stage 3

	Cyclist	Team	Time
1	Alberto Contador (ESP)	Astana	12h 14' 28"
2	Ezequiel Mosquera (ESP)	Karpin–Galicia	+ 3"
3	David Herrero (ESP)	Karpin–Galicia	+ 8"
4	Damiano Cunego (ITA)	Lampre	+ 8"
5	Kim Kirchen (LUX)	Team High Road	+ 8"

=== Stage 4 ===
10 April 2008 - Viana to Vitoria-Gasteiz, 171 km (106 mi)

Stage 4 Results

	Cyclist	Team	Time
1	Kim Kirchen (LUX)	Team High Road	4h 17' 33"
2	Morris Possoni (ITA)	Team High Road	s.t.
3	David Herrero (ESP)	Karpin–Galicia	s.t.
4	Michael Albasini (SUI)	Liquigas	s.t.
5	Matthew Lloyd (AUS)	Silence–Lotto	s.t.

General Classification after Stage 4

	Cyclist	Team	Time
1	Alberto Contador (ESP)	Astana	16h 32' 01"
2	Ezequiel Mosquera (ESP)	Karpin–Galicia	+ 3"
3	David Herrero (ESP)	Karpin–Galicia	+ 8"
4	Damiano Cunego (ITA)	Lampre	+ 8"
5	Kim Kirchen (LUX)	Team High Road	+ 8"

=== Stage 5 ===
11 April 2008 - Vitoria-Gasteiz to Orio, 162 km (101 mi)

Stage 5 Results

	Cyclist	Team	Time
1	Damiano Cunego (ITA)	Lampre	4h 02' 48"
2	Alberto Contador (ESP)	Astana	s.t.
3	~~Thomas Dekker (NED)~~	Rabobank	s.t.
4	Kim Kirchen (LUX)	Team High Road	s.t.
5	Davide Rebellin (ITA)	Gerolsteiner	s.t.

General Classification after Stage 5

	Cyclist	Team	Time
1	Alberto Contador (ESP)	Astana	20h 34' 49"
2	Damiano Cunego (ITA)	Lampre	+ 8"
3	Kim Kirchen (LUX)	Team High Road	+ 8"
4	David Herrero (ESP)	Karpin–Galicia	+ 8"
5	Cadel Evans (AUS)	Silence–Lotto	+ 8"

=== Stage 6 ===
12 April 2008 - Orio to Orio, 20 km (12 mi) (ITT)

Stage 6 Results

	Cyclist	Team	Time
1	Alberto Contador (ESP)	Astana	29' 10"
2	Cadel Evans (AUS)	Silence–Lotto	+ 22"
3	~~Thomas Dekker (NED)~~	~~Rabobank~~	+ 27"
4	Damiano Cunego (ITA)	Lampre	+ 49"
5	Robert Gesink (NED)	Rabobank	+ 1' 16"

General Classification after Stage 6

	Cyclist	Team	Time
1	Alberto Contador (ESP)	Astana	21h 03' 59"
2	Cadel Evans (AUS)	Silence–Lotto	+ 30"
3	~~Thomas Dekker (NED)~~	~~Rabobank~~	+ 35"
4	Damiano Cunego (ITA)	Lampre	+ 57"
5	Maxime Monfort (BEL)	Cofidis	+ 1' 25"

== General classification ==
	Cyclist	Team	Time
1	Alberto Contador (ESP)	Astana	21h 03' 59"
2	Cadel Evans (AUS)	Silence–Lotto	+ 30"
3	~~Thomas Dekker (NED)~~	~~Rabobank~~	+ 35"
4	Damiano Cunego (ITA)	Lampre	+ 57"
5	Maxime Monfort (BEL)	Cofidis	+ 1' 25"
6	Mikel Astarloza (ESP)	Euskaltel–Euskadi	+ 1' 37"
7	Kim Kirchen (LUX)	Team High Road	+ 1' 43"
8	Sandy Casar (FRA)	Française des Jeux	+ 2' 03"
9	Ezequiel Mosquera (ESP)	Karpin–Galicia	+ 2' 03"
10	Fränk Schleck (LUX)	Team CSC	+ 2' 05"

== Jersey progress ==
Stage	Winner	General Classification	Points Classification	Mountains Classification	Metas Volantes Classification	Team Classification
1	Alberto Contador	Alberto Contador	Alberto Contador	Egoi Martínez	Iban Mayoz	Saunier Duval–Scott
2	Kim Kirchen	Alberto Contador	David Herrero	Egoi Martínez	Iban Mayoz	Lampre
3	David Herrero	Alberto Contador	David Herrero	Egoi Martínez	Iban Mayoz	Saunier Duval–Scott
4	Kim Kirchen	Alberto Contador	David Herrero	Egoi Martínez	Iban Mayoz	Saunier Duval–Scott
5	Damiano Cunego	Alberto Contador	David Herrero	Egoi Martínez	Iban Mayoz	Karpin–Galicia
6	Alberto Contador	Alberto Contador	Damiano Cunego	Egoi Martínez	Iban Mayoz	Rabobank

- In stage 2, Ezequiel Mosquera wore the points jersey.

== Individual 2008 UCI ProTour standings after race ==
As of 13 April 2008, after the 2008 Tour of the Basque Country.

Rank	Name	Team	Points
1	André Greipel (GER)	Team High Road	62
2	Alberto Contador (ESP)	Astana	58
3	Stijn Devolder (BEL)	Quick-Step	50
4	José Joaquín Rojas (ESP)	Caisse d'Epargne	45
5	Cadel Evans (AUS)	Silence–Lotto	42
6	Óscar Freire (ESP)	Rabobank	40
7	Nick Nuyens (BEL)	Cofidis	40
8	~~Thomas Dekker (NED)~~	~~Rabobank~~	37
9	Juan Antonio Flecha (ESP)	Rabobank	35
10	Damiano Cunego (ITA)	Lampre	33
11	Aurélien Clerc (SUI)	Bouygues Télécom	30
12	Alessandro Ballan (ITA)	Lampre	30
