= 2009 Clásica de Almería =

Race details
- Dates: 1 March 2009
- Stages: 1
- Distance: 169.4 km (105.3 mi)
- Winning time: 4h 02' 45"

Results
	Winner	Greg Henderson (NZL)
	Second	Graeme Brown (AUS)
	Third	Stefano Garzelli (ITA)

The 2009 Clásica de Almería was the 24th edition of the Clásica de Almería cycle race and was held on 1 March 2009. The race started in Puebla de Vícar and finished in Almería. The race was won by Greg Henderson.

== General classification ==
Final general classification

Rank	Rider	Time
1	Greg Henderson (NZL)	4h 02' 45"
2	Graeme Brown (AUS)	+ 0"
3	Stefano Garzelli (ITA)	+ 0"
4	Javier Benítez Pomares (ESP)	+ 0"
5	Rubén Pérez (ESP)	+ 0"
6	Vincent Jérôme (FRA)	+ 0"
7	Tony Martin (GER)	+ 3"
8	Luis León Sánchez (ESP)	+ 3"
9	Alexandr Kolobnev (RUS)	+ 6"
10	Josep Jufré (ESP)	+ 6"
