= Greg Henderson =

New Zealand cyclist (born 1976)

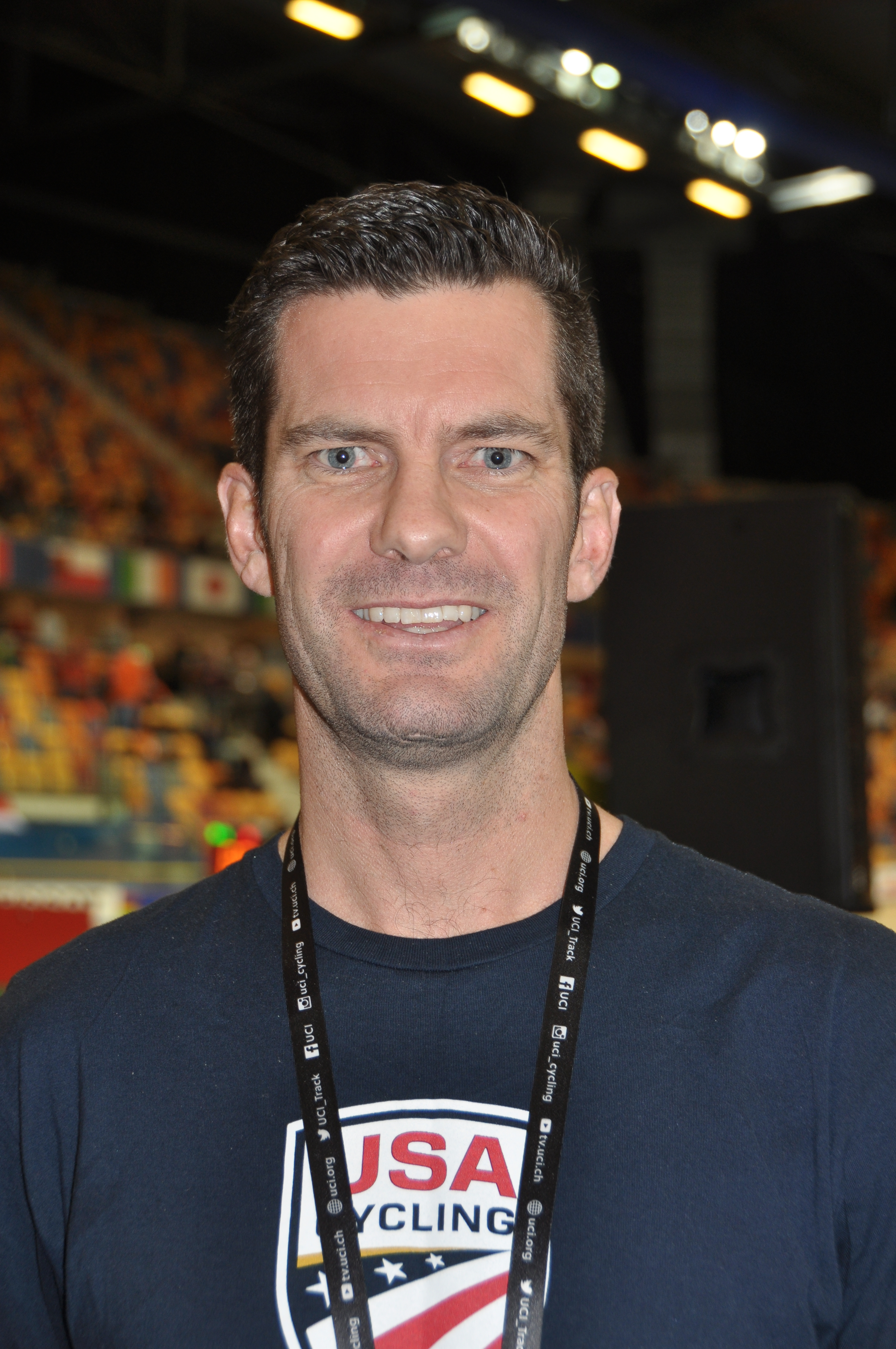
- Henderson in 2018

Personal information
- Full name: Gregory Henderson
- Nickname: Hendo
- Born: 10 September 1976 (age 50) Dunedin, New Zealand
- Height: 1.81 m (5 ft 11 in)
- Weight: 72.5 kg (160 lb)

Cycling career
- Sport: Cycling
- Current team: Retired
- Disciplines: Road; Track
- Role: Rider
- Rider type: Sprinter; Lead-out man

Professional teams
- 2002–2003: 7 UP–Maxxis
- 2004–2006: Health Net–Maxxis
- 2007–2009: T-Mobile Team
- 2010–2011: Team Sky
- 2012–2016: Lotto–Belisol
- 2017: UnitedHealthcare

Major wins
- Road Grand Tours Vuelta a España 1 individual stage (2009) One day races and Classics National Time Trial Championships (1996) Track Scratch, World Championships (2004)
Medal record
Men's track cycling
Representing New Zealand
UCI Track World Championships
Gold medal – first place	2004 Melbourne	Scratch
Silver medal – second place	2003 Stuttgart	Madison
Commonwealth Games
Gold medal – first place	2002 Manchester	Points race
Bronze medal – third place	1998 Kuala Lumpur	Points race
Bronze medal – third place	1998 Kuala Lumpur	Teams pursuit
Bronze medal – third place	2002 Manchester	Teams pursuit

Gregory Henderson (born 10 September 1976) is a New Zealand former professional track and road racing cyclist, who rode professionally between 2002 and 2017. His career includes winning the 15-kilometre (9.3-mile) scratch race at the 2004 world championships and, in road cycling, winning the points competition at the Tour de Georgia in 2005 and 2008.

Henderson rode in five Olympic Games and completed 11 Grand Tours. He also competed in four Commonwealth Games and was a four-time medallist, including winning gold in the points race in 2002. During an important part of his career, he served as André Greipel's main lead-out man, and they were colleagues at both T-Mobile Team and later Lotto–Soudal.

In addition to 17 New Zealand track and road titles and eight World Cup track golds, Henderson has been New Zealand Track Cyclist of the Year (2001, 2002, 2003) and Athlete of the Year, Otago, New Zealand (2001, 2002, 2003).

== Career ==
=== Track cycling ===
At the 1998 Commonwealth Games Henderson won bronze medals in the 40-kilometre (25-mile) points race and the 4-kilometre (2.5-mile) team pursuit.

He won gold in the 40-kilometre (25-mile) points race and bronze again in the 4-kilometre (2.5-mile) team pursuit at the 2002 Commonwealth Games.

He won the 15-kilometre (9.3-mile) scratch race at the 2004 UCI Track Cycling World Championships.

At the 2004 Summer Olympics he finished fourth in the points race and seventh in the madison.

His best placing in the 2006 Commonwealth Games was 10th in the scratch race.

At the 2008 Summer Olympics he finished tenth in the points race and the madison.

=== Road cycling ===
In 2005, he won the points competition at the Tour de Georgia and International Tour de Toona. In 2006, he recovered from early injuries and won the inaugural Pro Cycling Tour (PCT) Reading Classic.

In 2009, he won the Clásica de Almería in Spain, the second stage of Vuelta Ciclista a Murcia, and the third stage of the Vuelta a España on his Grand Tour debut.

In 2010, he won the first stage of the Paris–Nice. In 2011, he won stage 2 of Paris–Nice and stage 3 of the Tour of California.

Henderson left Team Sky at the end of 2011, and joined Lotto–Belisol, mainly to act as lead-out man for Andre Greipel. He credited his success in this role to the positioning skills which he developed as a track rider, and having to compete against quicker road sprinters such as Greipel, Mark Cavendish and Marcel Kittel. In April 2015, he expressed his opinion on Twitter that Fabio Aru of rival team Astana missed the Giro del Trentino not because of illness as it was announced, but because he had an ongoing investigation into his biological passport for doping. Henderson apologised shortly after. He competed in the 2016 Tour de France.

In August 2017 Henderson announced his retirement from competition, having competed in his last race, the 2017 Colorado Classic, and indicated that he would move into full-time coaching, having trained athletes since 2014. The following month he was announced as Endurance Performance Director for USA Cycling.

== Personal life ==
He was previously married to the Australian cyclist Katie Mactier. He has a bachelor's degree in Physical Education from the University of Otago.

== Major results ==
=== Road ===
1996
1st Time trial, National Championships
1997
1st Time trial, National Under-23 Championships
1998
1st Time trial, National Under-23 Championships
1999
1st National Criterium Championships
Tour of Wellington

1st Stages 3 & 10

2000
1st Stage 2 Tour of Wellington
National Road Championships

2nd Road race
2nd Time trial

2nd Omloop van de Vlaamse Scheldeboorden
2001
1st National Criterium Championships
1st Stage 5 Bay Classic Series
2002
1st Tour de Loveland
10th First Union Invitational
2003
1st Stage 7 Tour of Southland
2004
1st National Criterium Championships
Tour of Southland

1st Points classification
1st Stages 1 (TTT), 8 & 10

2005
1st National Criterium Championships
1st Wachovia Invitational
International Tour de Toona

1st Points classification
1st Stages 2 & 7

1st Sprints classification, Tour de Georgia
5th Overall Tour of Southland

1st Stages 1 (TTT), 4, 9 & 10

2006
1st Philadelphia International Championship
1st Reading Classic
1st Stage 7 Tour of Wellington
1st Stage 5 Tour of Southland
2nd Overall Bay Classic Series

1st Stage 1

6th Road race, Commonwealth Games
2007
5th Overall Tour of Qatar
2008
Tour de Georgia

1st Sprints classification
1st Stages 3 & 7

7th Scheldeprijs
2009
1st Clásica de Almería
1st Stage 3 Vuelta a España
1st Stage 2 Vuelta a Murcia
1st Stage 7 Volta a Catalunya
2nd Philadelphia International Championship
5th Overall Three Days of De Panne
2010
1st Down Under Classic
Tour of Southland

1st Stages 1 (TTT), 4 & 9

1st Stage 1 Paris–Nice
1st Stage 3 Ster Elektrotoer
1st Stage 4 Eneco Tour
2nd Overall Bay Classic Series

1st Stage 2

3rd Overall Tour of Britain

1st Points classification
1st Stage 2

3rd Overall Tour Down Under
4th Scheldeprijs
2011
1st Stage 2 Paris–Nice
1st Stage 3 Tour of California
National Road Championships

2nd Road race
3rd Time trial

3rd Paris–Bourges
2012
1st Stage 1 Bay Classic Series
7th Kampioenschap van Vlaanderen
9th Down Under Classic
2013
2nd Overall Bay Classic Series
3rd Down Under Classic
2014
1st Stage 2 Ster ZLM Toer
3rd Ronde van Limburg
4th Overall World Ports Classic
7th Road race, Commonwealth Games
2015
2nd Overall Bay Classic Series

1st Stage 4

10th Down Under Classic
2016
6th Overall Tour of Turkey

==== Grand Tour general classification results timeline ====
Grand Tour	2007	2008	2009	2010	2011	2012	2013	2014	2015	2016
Giro d'Italia	DNF	—	—	88	—	—	—	—	DNF	—
Tour de France	—	—	—	—	—	124	162	DNF	DNF	155
Vuelta a España	—	—	123	—	—	—	DNF	133	—	—

Legend
—	Did not compete
DNF	Did not finish

=== Track ===
1998
Commonwealth Games

3rd Points race
3rd Team pursuit

1999
National Championships

1st Team pursuit
1st Points race

UCI World Cup Classics, Mexico City

2nd Team pursuit
3rd Madison

2000
1st Team pursuit, National Championships
2nd Six Days of Nouméa
2001
Goodwill Games

1st Points race
1st Madison

1st Points race, National Championships
2002
Commonwealth Games

1st Points race
3rd Team pursuit

UCI World Cup Classics, Sydney

1st Team pursuit
1st Madison
3rd Points race

2003
1st Madison, National Championships
UCI World Cup Classics, Sydney

1st Scratch
3rd Points race

2nd Madison, UCI World Championships (with Hayden Roulston)
2004
1st Scratch, UCI World Championships
2nd Scratch, UCI World Cup Classics, Aguascalientes
2005
UCI World Cup Classics, Sydney

1st Team pursuit
3rd Scratch

2nd Scratch, UCI World Championships
2006
Oceania Games

1st Points race
1st Scratch

1st Points race, National Championships
2nd Points race, UCI World Cup Classics, Sydney
2007
Oceania Championships

1st Madison
2nd Points race
2nd Scratch

1st Points race, UCI World Cup Classics, Sydney
