= Gonzalo Rabuñal =

Spanish cyclist

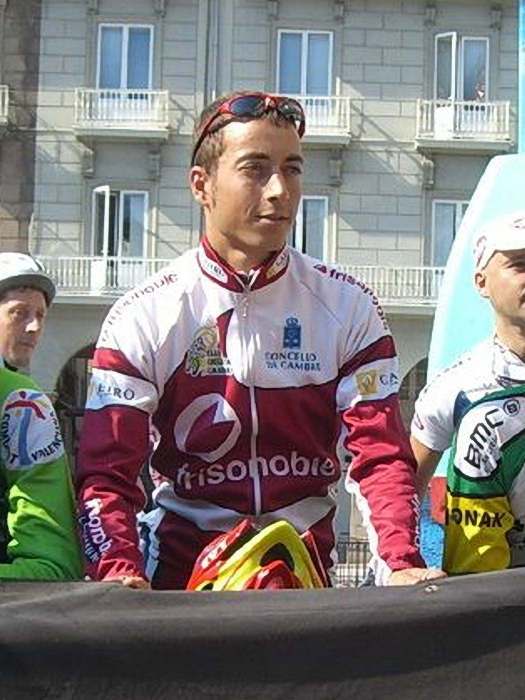

Personal information
- Full name: Gonzalo Rabuñal Rios
- Born: August 1, 1984 (age 42) Arteixo

Cycling career
- Sport: Cycling
- Current team: Xacobeo–Galicia
- Discipline: Road
- Role: Domestique

Professional team
- 2007–2010: Karpin–Galicia

Gonzalo Rabuñal Rios (born 1 August 1984 in Arteixo) is a retired Spanish professional road bicycle racer who last rode for the UCI Professional Continental team Xacobeo–Galicia.

== Major results ==
2010
1st Mountains classification, Tour of the Basque Country
