= David Herrero =

Spanish cyclist

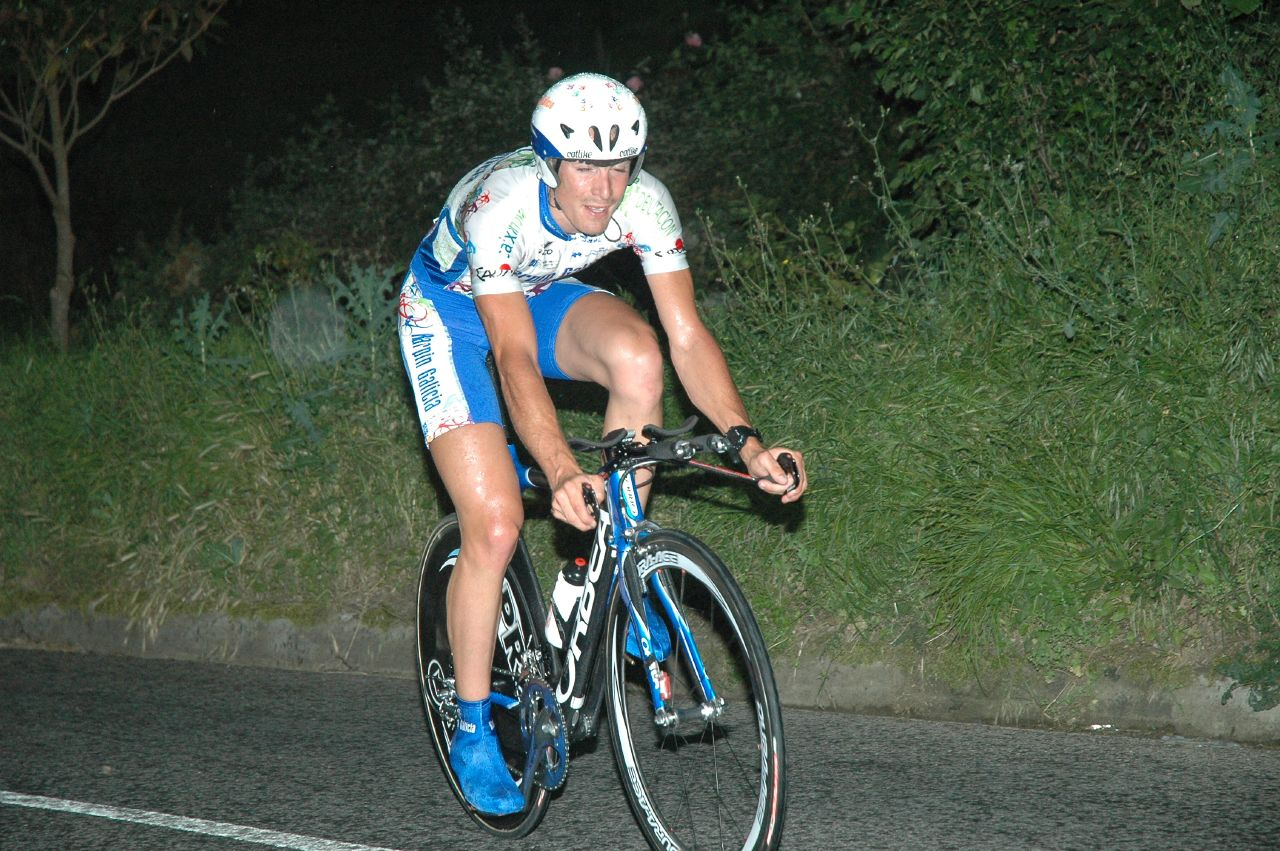

Personal information
- Full name: David Herrero Llorente
- Born: October 18, 1979 (age 46) Bilbao, Spain

Cycling career
- Sport: Cycling
- Current team: Retired
- Discipline: Road
- Role: Rider

Professional teams
- 2001–2003: Euskaltel–Euskadi
- 2004: Costa de Almería–Paternina
- 2005–2006: Euskaltel–Euskadi
- 2007–2009: Karpin–Galicia

David Herrero Llorente (born October 18, 1979 in Bilbao, Basque Country) is a Spanish former professional road bicycle racer, who rode professionally between 2001 and 2009 for the Costa de Almería–Paternina, Euskaltel–Euskadi (two spells) and Xacobeo–Galicia.

== Major results ==
2002
1st Stage 1 Vuelta a Castilla y León
2003
1st Stage 1 Vuelta a La Rioja
2004
1st Prueba Villafranca de Ordizia
1st Stage 2 Vuelta a Asturias
2005
1st GP Llodio
1st Stage 2 Clasica de Alcobendas
1st Stage 4b (ITT) Euskal Bizikleta
1st Stage 5 Vuelta a Burgos
2006
2nd Overall Euskal Bizikleta

1st Stage 5

3rd Time trial, National Road Championships
2008
1st Stage 3 Tour of the Basque Country
