= Ezequiel Mosquera =

Spanish road bicycle racer

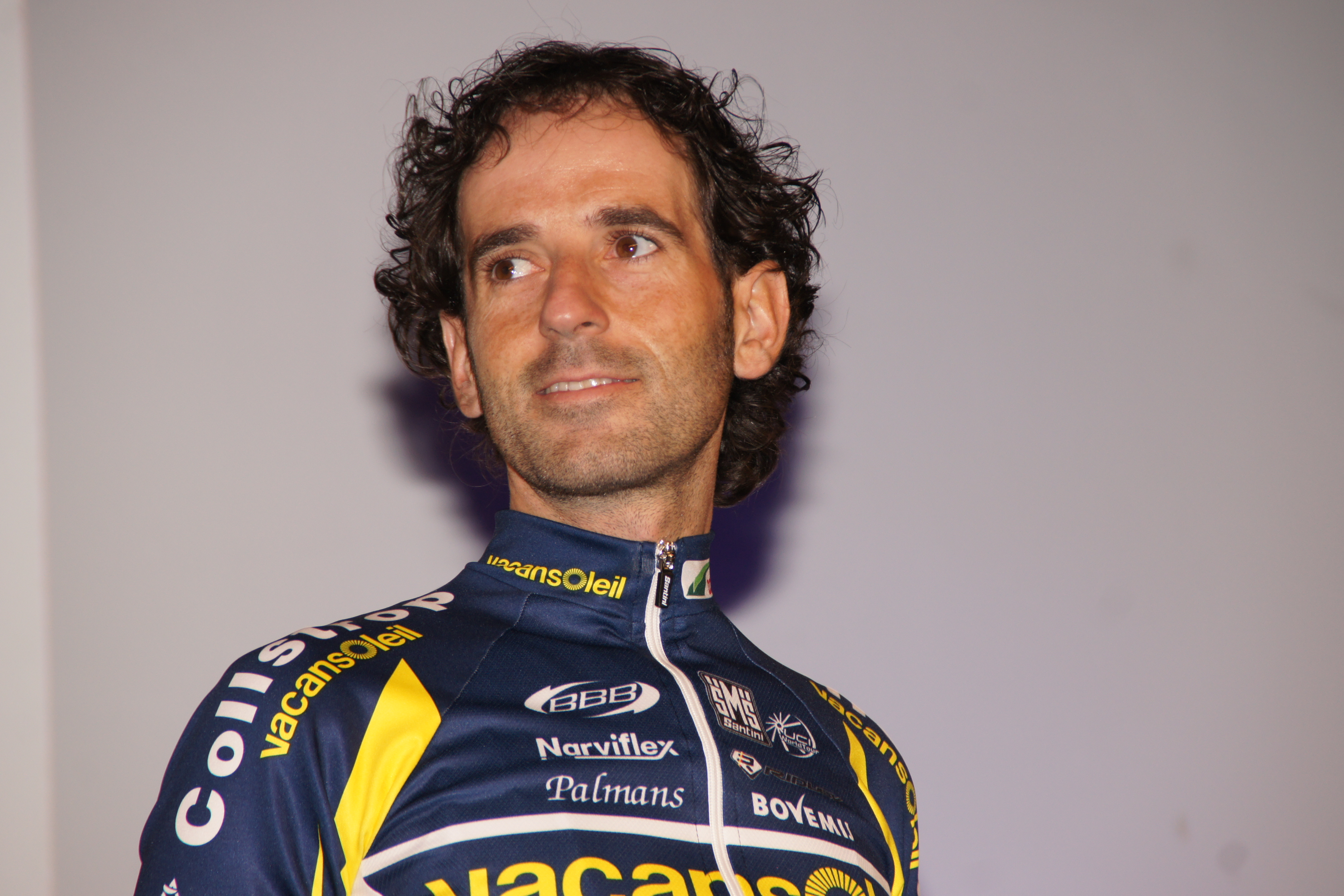

Personal information
- Full name: Ezequiel Mosquera Míguez
- Nickname: Eze
- Born: November 19, 1975 (age 50) Cacheiras-Teo, Spain

Cycling career
- Sport: Cycling
- Discipline: Road
- Role: Rider
- Rider type: Climbing specialist

Professional teams
- 1999–2002: Paredes Moveis
- 2003: Cantanhede
- 2004: Carvalhelhos–Boavista
- 2005: Kaiku
- 2006: Comunidad Valenciana
- 2007–2010: Karpin–Galicia
- 2011: Vacansoleil–DCM

Major wins
- Grand Tours Vuelta a España 1 individual stage (2010)

Ezequiel Mosquera Míguez (born 19 November 1975) is a Spanish former road bicycle racer. He has finished in the top 5 of the Vuelta a España in all appearances, and finished second in 2010, after putting in a strong time trial and winning the penultimate stage to Bola del Mundo. After testing positive for hydroxyethyl starch in the race, he was suspended by the UCI and his results from the 2010 Vuelta were annulled.

== 2010 Vuelta a España ==
In the 2010 Vuelta a España, Mosquera initially finished in second place, riding for Xacobeo–Galicia.

After that, he signed a contract with Vacansoleil–DCM to ride for them in 2011.

On September 30, 2010 UCI reported that Mosquera and his teammate David García Dapena tested positive for hydroxyethyl starch during the 2010 Vuelta. Hydroxyethyl starch is associated with endurance athletes trying to cover up erythropoietin usage.

His new team Vacansoleil–DCM did not allow him to ride while he was still under investigation. In April 2011, the Union Cycliste Internationale sent his dossier to the Spanish cycling authorities, who opened their own investigation in July, and suspended Mosquera in November. He was suspended for two years, not counting the 2011 season where he did not ride. Vacansoleil–DCM fired him after his suspension became official.

== Major results ==
2005
1st Stage 3 Vuelta a La Rioja
2007
3rd Overall Vuelta a Mallorca
5th Overall Vuelta a España
2008
1st Overall Clasica de Alcobendas

1st Stage 1

4th Overall Vuelta a España
5th Overall Vuelta a Burgos
9th Overall Tour of the Basque Country
2009
4th Overall Vuelta a Burgos

1st Stage 5

5th Overall Vuelta a España
2010
2nd Overall Vuelta a España

1st Stage 20

2nd Overall Vuelta a Burgos
3rd Overall Vuelta a Castilla y León
4th Overall Vuelta a Asturias

=== Grand Tour general classification results timeline ===
Grand Tour	2007	2008	2009	2010
Giro d'Italia	—	—	—	—
Tour de France	—	—	—	—
Vuelta a España	5	4	5	2

Legend
—	Did not compete
DNF	Did not finish
