= William Bonnet =

Road bicycle racer (born 1982)

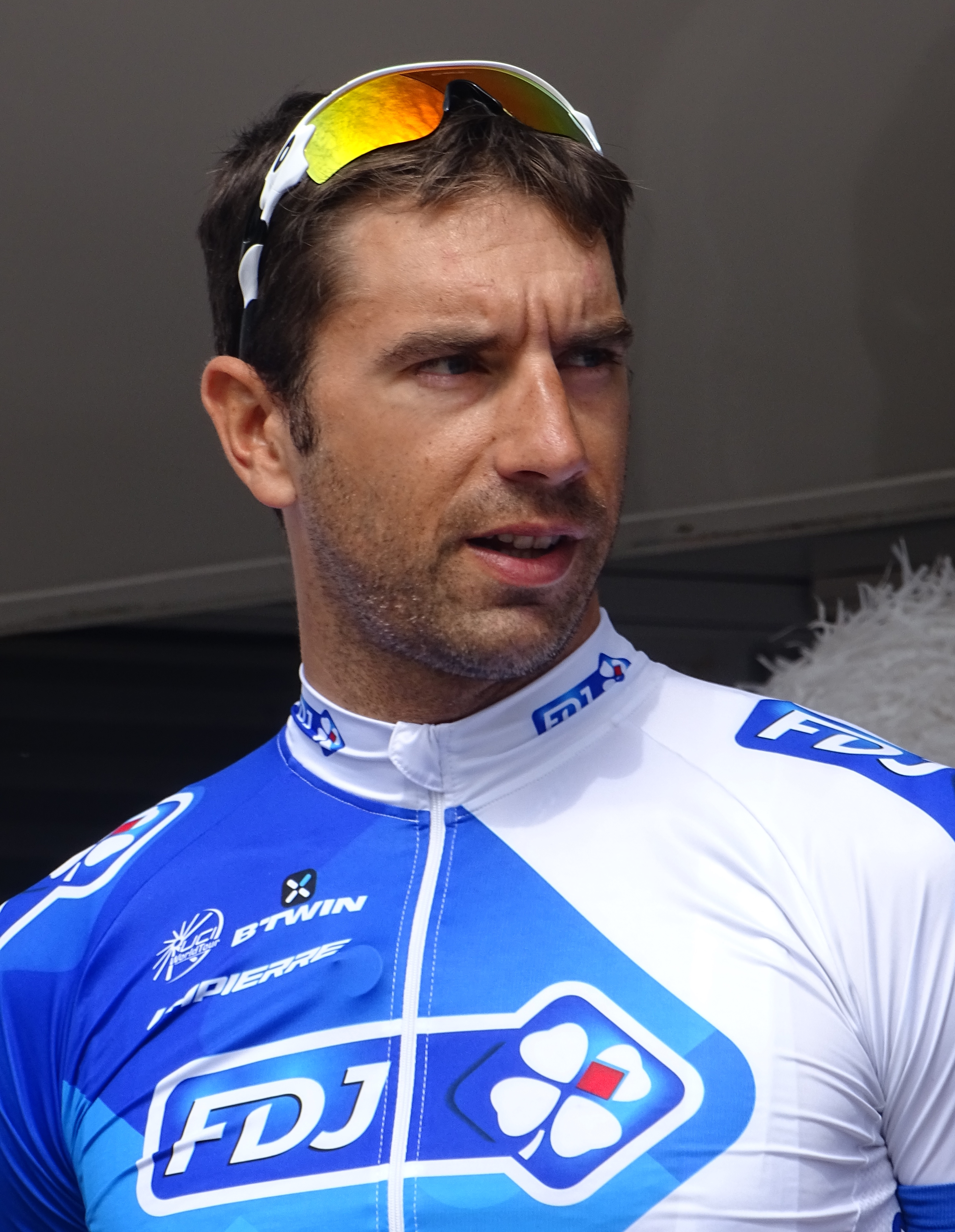
- Bonnet in 2015

Personal information
- Full name: William Bonnet
- Born: 25 June 1982 (age 44) Saint-Doulchard, France
- Height: 1.85 m (6 ft 1 in)
- Weight: 78 kg (172 lb)

Cycling career
- Sport: Cycling
- Current team: Groupama–FDJ United
- Discipline: Road
- Role: Rider
- Rider type: Sprinter; Road captain

Professional teams
- 2002–2005: BigMat–Auber 93
- 2006–2008: Crédit Agricole
- 2009–2010: Bbox Bouygues Telecom
- 2011–2021: FDJ

William Bonnet (French: [wiljam bɔnɛ]; born 25 June 1982) is a French former professional road bicycle racer, who last rode for UCI WorldTeam Groupama–FDJ. In the 2015 Tour de France, Bonnet crashed at full speed on stage 3 near Huy in Belgium after clipping wheels of a rider in front. He has suffered a multiple fracture of the second cervical vertebrae and was rushed to Paris for surgery and placed in an induced coma before any neurological damage was done. Bonnet retired from competition at the end of the 2021 season.

== Major results ==
2000
2nd Team pursuit, UCI Junior Track World Championships
2003
4th Grand Prix de la ville de Nogent-sur-Oise
2004
1st Paris–Mantes-en-Yvelines
10th Boucle de l'Artois
2005
1st Stage 1 Paris–Corrèze
4th Châteauroux Classic
6th Overall Tour de Normandie
7th Overall Tour du Limousin
8th Overall Tour de Picardie
9th Grand Prix de Denain
2006
3rd Grand Prix de Wallonie
5th Grand Prix de Fourmies
7th Grand Prix de Denain
7th Tro-Bro Léon
7th Tour de Rijke
9th Paris–Brussels
10th Grote Prijs Jef Scherens
2007
7th Dwars door Vlaanderen
7th Tour de Vendée
2008
1st Grand Prix de la Somme
1st Grand Prix d'Isbergues
7th Vattenfall Cyclassics
8th Overall Tour du Poitou-Charentes
2009
9th Overall Paris–Corrèze
2010
1st Stage 2 Paris–Nice
10th Dwars door Vlaanderen
10th Tour of Flanders
2011
6th E3 Prijs Vlaanderen
2016
8th Road race, UCI Road World Championships

=== Grand Tour general classification results timeline ===
Grand Tour	2006	2007	2008	2009	2010	2011	2012	2013	2014	2015	2016	2017	2018	2019	2020
Giro d'Italia	111	—	—	—	DNF	—	DNF	—	—	—	—	DNF	DNF	—	—
Tour de France	—	109	102	128	—	DNF	—	DNF	158	DNF	127	—	—	143	DNF
/ Vuelta a España	—	—	—	109	111	—	152	—	—	—	—	—	—	—	—

Legend
—	Did not compete
DNF	Did not finish
