= Javier Benítez (cyclist) =

Spanish cyclist (born 1979)

Personal information
- Full name: Javier Benítez Pomares
- Born: 3 January 1979 (age 47) Canals, Spain

Cycling career
- Sport: Cycling
- Current team: Retired
- Discipline: Road
- Role: Rider
- Rider type: Sprinter

Amateur teams
- 1999: Pinturas Banaka
- 2000–2001: Iberdrola–Loina
- 2002–2003: Caja Castilla La Mancha
- 2004: FC Barcelona–Excellent Center
- 2010: Asfaltos Guerola–CA Valencia Terra i Mar
- 2012: Mutua Levante–Cafemax–Renault Ginestar

Professional teams
- 2005: Relax–Fuenlabrada
- 2006: Grupo Nicolás Mateos
- 2007–2008: Benfica
- 2009: Contentpolis–Ampo
- 2011: KTM–Murcia

Javier Benítez Pomares (born 3 January 1979, in Canals) is a Spanish former cyclist.

== Major results ==
2003
1st Stage 3 Vuelta a Extremadura
1st Stage 1 Vuelta a la Comunidad de Madrid
2004
1st Stages 1b & 3 Vuelta a León
2006
1st Stages 2, 4 & 5 Vuelta a Extremadura
1st Stages 1, 2 & 4 Volta a Portugal
1st Stages 2 & 4 GP CTT Correios de Portugal
1st Stages 1 & 2 Troféu Joaquim Agostinho
3rd Circuito de Getxo
2007
1st Stages 2, 3a & 5 Volta ao Alentejo
1st Stages 1 & 4 Volta ao Distrito de Santarém
1st Stages 1, 3 & 4 Troféu Joaquim Agostinho
3rd Neuseen Classics
2008
1st Overall Grande Prémio Crédito Agrícola de la Costa Azul

1st Stage 4

1st Stages 1, 5 & 7 Vuelta a Chihuahua
2009
1st Stages 1, 2 & 6 Vuelta a Chihuahua
