= Dominik Roels =

German cyclist

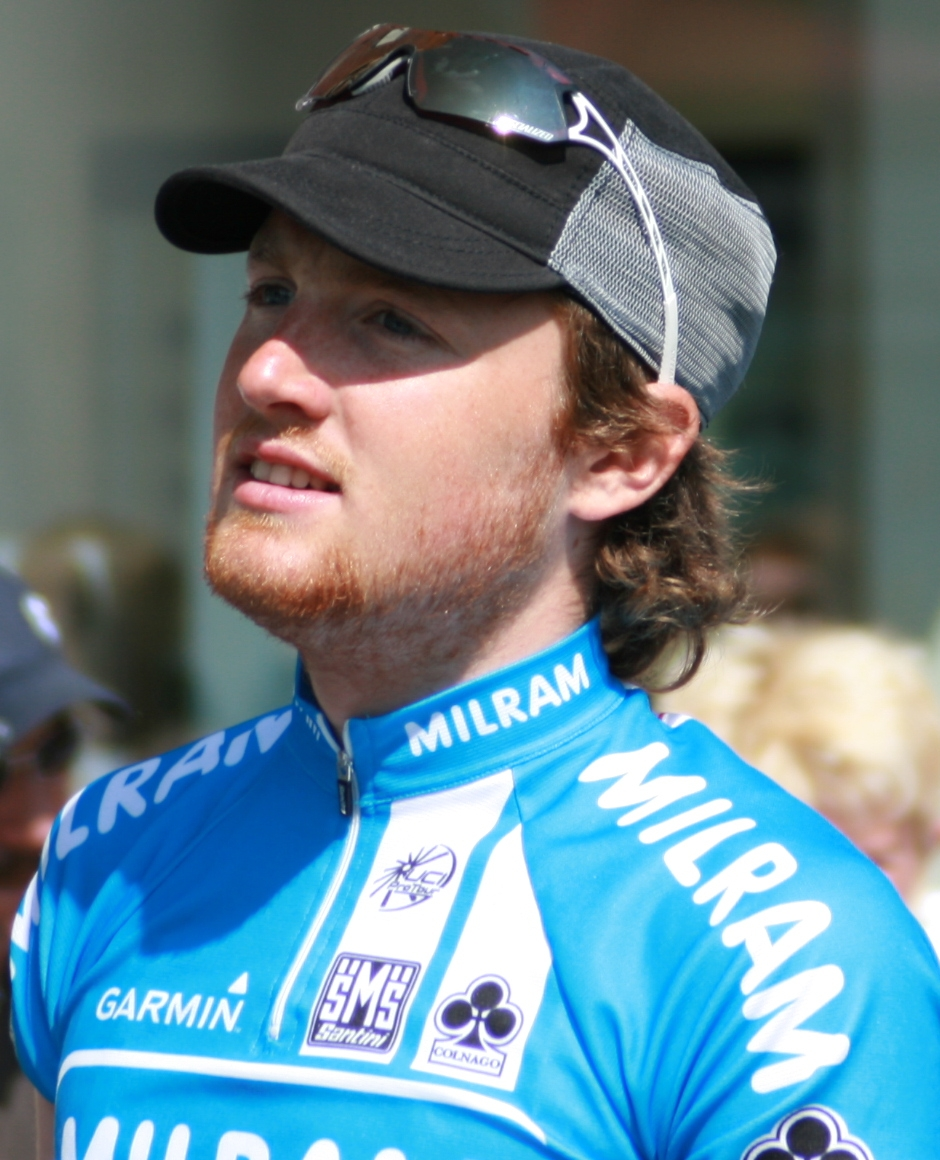

Personal information
- Full name: Dominik Roels
- Born: 21 January 1987 (age 39) Cologne, West Germany

Cycling career
- Sport: Cycling
- Current team: Retired
- Discipline: Road
- Role: Rider

Amateur teams
- AKUD-Arnolds Sicherheit
- 2006: Wiesenhof (trainee)

Professional teams
- 2007: AKUD-Rose
- 2008–2010: Team Milram

Dominik Roels (born 21 January 1987, in Köln) is a former German professional road bicycle racer, who previously rode for German Team Milram. He announced his retirement in January 2011.

== Palmares ==
2003
2nd, National U17 Points Race Championship
2005
Germany U19 Road Race Champion
Germany U19 Points Race Champion
1st, Overall, Münsterland Tour (U19)
2nd, National U19 Time Trial Championship
2006
Germany U23 Road Race Champion
1st, Stage 1, Vuelta a Tenerife
2nd, National U23 Time Trial Championship
