= David García (cyclist, born 1977) =

Spanish cyclist

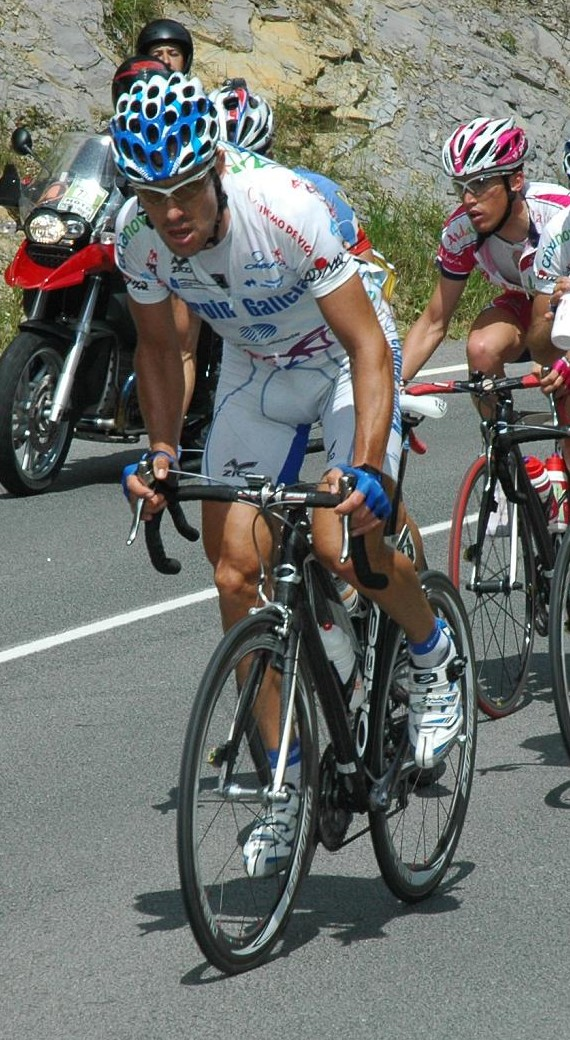

Personal information
- Full name: David García Dapena
- Born: 30 September 1977 (age 49) Marín, Spain

Cycling career
- Sport: Cycling
- Current team: Retired
- Discipline: Road
- Role: Rider

Professional teams
- 1999: LA-Pecol
- 2000–2003: Castanhede
- 2004: LA-Lapecol
- 2005–2006: LA-Liberty
- 2007–2008: Karpin–Galicia
- 2009–2010: Xacobeo–Galicia

Major wins
- Tour of Turkey 2008

David García Dapena (born 30 September 1977 in Marín, Pontevedra) is a retired Spanish professional road bicycle racer.

== Doping ==
During the 2010 Vuelta a España he tested positive for EPO. A later sample also tested positive for HES. The Spanish Cycling Federation subsequently banned him for 2 years, effective 6 October 2010, and declared his results of the 2010 Vuelta a España void. After retiring, García disclosed information to the police about how he had acquired the product, which led to the arrest of Alberto Beltrán Niño in March 2012.

== Major results ==
2000
1st, Stage 8, Volta a Portugal do Futuro
2001
1st, Stage 4, GP Philips
2003
1st, Stage 2, GP Castanhede
1st, Stage 1, GP Abimota
1st, Stage 4, GP Abimota
2004
1st, Stage 4, Volta a Terras de Santa Maria
1st, Stage 2, Volta a Tras os Montes
2005
1st, Stage, GP Abimota
2006
1st, Stage, Volta a Terras de Santa Maria
2008
1st, Overall, Presidential Cycling Tour of Turkey
1st, Stage 15, Vuelta a España
2009
1st, Stage 2, Presidential Cycling Tour of Turkey
1st, Vuelta a La Rioja
