= Xacobeo–Galicia =

Xacobeo Galicia

Team information
- UCI code: KGZ (2007–2008); XGZ (2009); XAC (2010)
- Registered: Spain
- Founded: 2007
- Disbanded: 2010
- Discipline: Road
- Status: Professional Continental
- Bicycles: BH; Orbea

Key personnel
- General manager: Rodrigo Rodríguez

Team name history
- 2006–2007 2007–2008 2009–2010: Fundación Ciclismo Galego; Karpin-Galicia; Xacobeo Galicia
Jersey

Xacobeo Galicia was a professional continental cycling team from Spain. It competed in the UCI Europe Tour and, when selected as a wild card, in UCI ProTour events. The creation of the team was announced on July 11, 2006, as Fundación Ciclismo Galego following the withdrawal of four of the nine Spanish professional cycling teams from the sport. Xacobeo Galicia was managed by Rodrigo Rodriguez, with assistance from directeur sportif Álvaro Pino, Jesús Blanco Villar and José Angel Vidal.

The team received wildcard invitations to the Vuelta a España in 2007 and 2008.

It disappeared in 2010 following the withdrawal of the Xunta de Galicia as sponsors.

== History ==
In 2006, the Galician regional government, the Xunta de Galicia, proposed the creation of a Galician professional cycling team in an attempt to emulate the success the Basque government-sponsored Euskaltel–Euskadi team.

The project received not only the economic support of the Xunta but that of the former Russian international footballer Valery Karpin, who following his retirement had set up Valery Karpin, S.L., a property company in the region.

On August 26, 2008, with the acquisition of a new sponsor the team changed its name from Karpin Galicia to Xacobeo Galicia.

Karpin Galicia (2007–2008)

Xacobeo Galicia (2010)

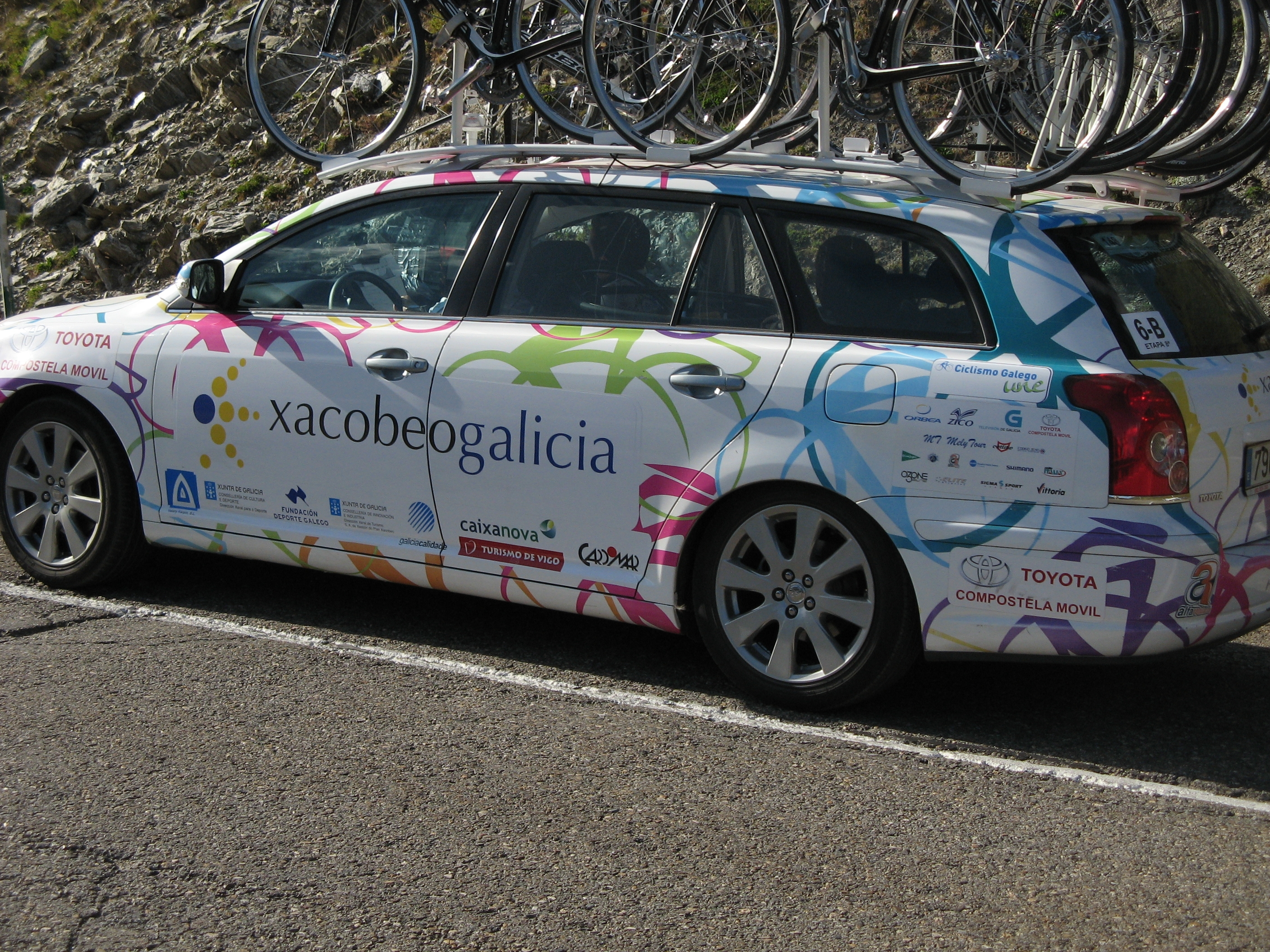

== Wins ==
2007

- 1st Clásica de Almería
- 1st Stage 2 GP Torres Vedras
- 1st Stage 6 & 9 Volta a Portugal

2008

- 1st Stage 3 Tour of the Basque Country
- 1st Overall Presidential Cycling Tour of Turkey
- 1st Overall Clasica Alcobendas

1st Stage 1

- 1st Overall Volta a Catalunya
- 1st Stage 15 Vuelta a España

2009

- 1st Stage 2 Presidential Cycling Tour of Turkey
- 1st Vuelta a La Rioja
- 1st Stage 4 GP Paredes Rota dos Moveis
- 1st Stage 3 Vuelta a la Comunidad de Madrid
- 1st Stage 5 Vuelta a Burgos
- 1st Stage 9 Vuelta a España

2010

- 1st Circuito de Getxo
- 1st Stage 20 Vuelta a España

== Former riders ==
As of July 20, 2010.

Rider	Date of birth
Carlos Castaño (ESP)	May 7, 1979 (age 47)
Gustavo César (ESP)	January 29, 1980 (age 46)
Gustavo Domínguez (ESP)	October 17, 1980 (age 45)
José Antonio de Segovia (ESP)	October 22, 1982 (age 43)
Delio Fernández (ESP)	February 17, 1986 (age 40)
Alberto Fernández (ESP)	November 15, 1981 (age 44)
David García (ESP)	September 30, 1977 (age 48)
Marcos García (ESP)	December 4, 1986 (age 39)

Rider	Date of birth
Rodrigo García (ESP)	February 27, 1980 (age 46)
Vladimir Isaichev (RUS)	April 21, 1986 (age 40)
Serafín Martínez (ESP)	February 14, 1984 (age 42)
Ezequiel Mosquera (ESP)	November 19, 1975 (age 50)
Nelson Oliveira (POR)	March 6, 1989 (age 37)
Francisco José Pacheco (ESP)	March 27, 1982 (age 44)
Gonzalo Rabuñal (ESP)	August 1, 1984 (age 42)
Gustavo Rodríguez (ESP)	September 16, 1979 (age 46)
