= 2011 Tour of the Basque Country =

2011 Vuelta al País Vasco
2011 UCI World Tour, race 8 of 27
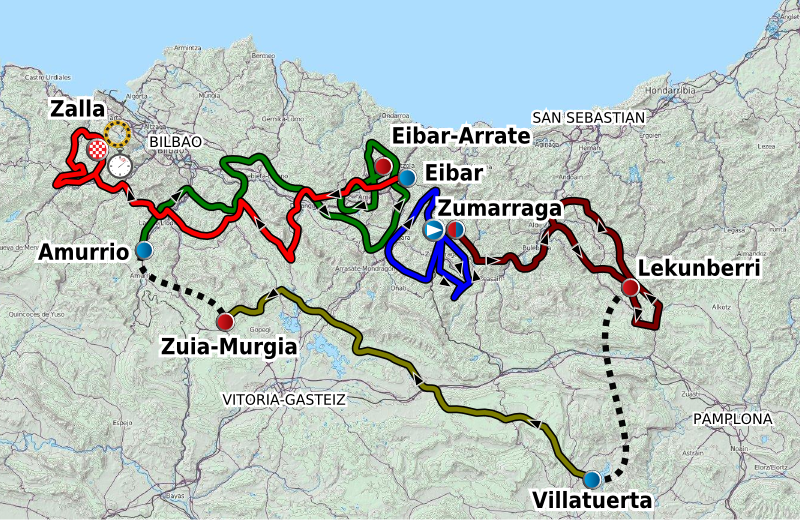

Race details
- Dates: 4–9 April
- Stages: 6
- Distance: 874.2 km (543.2 mi)
- Winning time: 22h 12' 11"

Results
Jersey awarded to the overall winner	Winner	Andreas Klöden (Germany)	(Team RadioShack)
	Second	Chris Horner (United States)	(Team RadioShack)
	Third	Robert Gesink (Netherlands)	(Rabobank)
Jersey awarded to the points classification winner	Points	Andreas Klöden (Germany)	(Team RadioShack)
Jersey awarded to the mountains classification winner	Mountains	Michael Albasini (Switzerland)	(HTC–Highroad)
Jersey awarded to the sprints classification winner	Sprints	Bram Tankink (Netherlands)	(Rabobank)
	Team	Movistar Team	

The 2011 Tour of the Basque Country, was the 51st running of the Tour of the Basque Country cycling stage race. It started on 4 April in Zumarraga and ended on 9 April in Zalla and consisted of six stages, including a race-concluding individual time trial. It was the eighth race of the 2011 UCI World Tour season.

The race was won by Team RadioShack rider Andreas Klöden, who claimed the leader's yellow jersey for the second time – having previously won the race in 2000 – with a second-place finish on the final time trial stage. Klöden had also led the race after stage two, having finished second on the stage; one of three second place stage finishes that Klöden achieved during the week. Klöden's winning margin over his team-mate and runner-up Chris Horner was 47 seconds, and Rabobank's Robert Gesink completed the podium, also 47 seconds down on Klöden, but behind Horner on countback.

In the race's other classifications, Klöden's consistent high finishes earned him the white jersey for amassing the highest number of points at stage finishes, HTC–Highroad rider Michael Albasini won the King of the Mountains classification, Bram Tankink of Rabobank won the blue jersey for the sprints classification, with Movistar Team finishing at the head of the teams classification.

== Teams ==
As the Tour of the Basque Country was part of the 2011 UCI World Tour, all 18 UCI ProTeams were invited automatically and obligated to attend. Two UCI Professional Continental teams were awarded wildcards, and these were the Geox–TMC and Caja Rural teams.

The full list of participating teams was:

- Ag2r–La Mondiale
- Astana
- BMC Racing Team
- Caja Rural
- Euskaltel–Euskadi
- Garmin–Cervélo
- Geox–TMC
- HTC–Highroad
- Lampre–ISD
- Leopard Trek
- Liquigas–Cannondale
- Omega Pharma–Lotto
- Quick-Step
- Rabobank
- Team Katusha
- Movistar Team
- Team RadioShack
- Saxo Bank–SunGard
- Team Sky
- Vacansoleil–DCM

== Race previews and favourites ==
2010 race winner Chris Horner was a favourite and had Team RadioShack teammate, and 2000 winner Andreas Klöden to help him. Other heavy contenders included Ivan Basso as he prepared for the 2011 Tour de France, Damiano Cunego and Robert Gesink. Samuel Sánchez had hopes in redeeming himself after a split in the peloton ruined his chance of victory in 2010, warming up for the race by taking the GP Miguel Induráin one-day race two days before the start of the Tour. Fränk Schleck was also expected to do well after winning Critérium International and his brother Andy was also a part of the Leopard Trek squad in the Basque Country.

== Stages ==
=== Stage 1 ===
4 April 2011 – Zumarraga to Zumarraga, 151.2 km (94.0 mi)

Stage 1 result

	Rider	Team	Time
1	Joaquim Rodríguez (ESP)	Team Katusha	4h 02' 42"
2	Samuel Sánchez (ESP)	Euskaltel–Euskadi	s.t.
3	Andreas Klöden (GER)	Team RadioShack	s.t.
4	Chris Horner (USA)	Team RadioShack	+ 1"
5	Ryder Hesjedal (CAN)	Garmin–Cervélo	+ 6"
6	Damiano Cunego (ITA)	Lampre–ISD	+ 6"
7	David López García (ESP)	Movistar Team	+ 6"
8	Robert Gesink (NED)	Rabobank	+ 6"
9	Danilo Di Luca (ITA)	Team Katusha	+ 6"
10	Xavier Tondó (ESP)	Movistar Team	+ 6"

General Classification after Stage 1

	Rider	Team	Time
1	Joaquim Rodríguez (ESP)	Team Katusha	4h 02' 42"
2	Samuel Sánchez (ESP)	Euskaltel–Euskadi	+ 0"
3	Andreas Klöden (GER)	Team RadioShack	+ 0"
4	Chris Horner (USA)	Team RadioShack	+ 1"
5	Ryder Hesjedal (CAN)	Garmin–Cervélo	+ 6"
6	Damiano Cunego (ITA)	Lampre–ISD	+ 6"
7	David López García (ESP)	Movistar Team	+ 6"
8	Robert Gesink (NED)	Rabobank	+ 6"
9	Danilo Di Luca (ITA)	Team Katusha	+ 6"
10	Xavier Tondó (ESP)	Movistar Team	+ 6"

=== Stage 2 ===
5 April 2011 – Zumarraga to Lekunberri, 163 km (101.3 mi)

Stage 2 result

	Rider	Team	Time
1	Vasil Kiryienka (BLR)	Movistar Team	4h 06' 39"
2	Andreas Klöden (GER)	Team RadioShack	+ 2"
3	Andy Schleck (LUX)	Leopard Trek	+ 2"
4	Chris Anker Sørensen (DEN)	Saxo Bank–SunGard	+ 2"
5	Chris Horner (USA)	Team RadioShack	+ 2"
6	Jurgen Van den Broeck (BEL)	Omega Pharma–Lotto	+ 2"
7	Ryder Hesjedal (CAN)	Garmin–Cervélo	+ 2"
8	Fränk Schleck (LUX)	Leopard Trek	+ 2"
9	Fabio Duarte (COL)	Geox–TMC	+ 2"
10	Joaquim Rodríguez (ESP)	Team Katusha	+ 2"

General Classification after Stage 2

	Rider	Team	Time
1	Andreas Klöden (GER)	Team RadioShack	8h 09' 23"
2	Joaquim Rodríguez (ESP)	Team Katusha	+ 0"
3	Samuel Sánchez (ESP)	Euskaltel–Euskadi	+ 0"
4	Chris Horner (USA)	Team RadioShack	+ 1"
5	Ryder Hesjedal (CAN)	Garmin–Cervélo	+ 6"
6	David López García (ESP)	Movistar Team	+ 6"
7	Damiano Cunego (ITA)	Lampre–ISD	+ 6"
8	Xavier Tondó (ESP)	Movistar Team	+ 6"
9	Robert Gesink (NED)	Rabobank	+ 6"
10	Beñat Intxausti (ESP)	Movistar Team	+ 9"

=== Stage 3 ===
6 April 2011 – Villatuerta to Zuia, 180 km (111.8 mi)

Stage 3 result

	Rider	Team	Time
1	Alexander Vinokourov (KAZ)	Astana	4h 20' 38"
2	Óscar Freire (ESP)	Rabobank	+ 8"
3	Paul Martens (GER)	Rabobank	+ 8"
4	Pim Ligthart (NED)	Vacansoleil–DCM	+ 8"
5	Mikaël Cherel (FRA)	Ag2r–La Mondiale	+ 8"
6	Egoitz García (ESP)	Caja Rural	+ 8"
7	Francesco Gavazzi (ITA)	Lampre–ISD	+ 8"
8	Chris Horner (USA)	Team RadioShack	+ 8"
9	Damiano Caruso (ITA)	Liquigas–Cannondale	+ 8"
10	Joaquim Rodríguez (ESP)	Team Katusha	+ 8"

General Classification after Stage 3

	Rider	Team	Time
1	Joaquim Rodríguez (ESP)	Team Katusha	12h 30' 09"
2	Andreas Klöden (GER)	Team RadioShack	+ 0"
3	Samuel Sánchez (ESP)	Euskaltel–Euskadi	+ 0"
4	Chris Horner (USA)	Team RadioShack	+ 1"
5	Ryder Hesjedal (CAN)	Garmin–Cervélo	+ 6"
6	Xavier Tondó (ESP)	Movistar Team	+ 6"
7	Damiano Cunego (ITA)	Lampre–ISD	+ 6"
8	David López García (ESP)	Movistar Team	+ 6"
9	Robert Gesink (NED)	Rabobank	+ 6"
10	Beñat Intxausti (ESP)	Movistar Team	+ 9"

=== Stage 4 ===
7 April 2011 – Amurrio to Eibar, 179 km (111.2 mi)

Stage 4 result

	Rider	Team	Time
1	Samuel Sánchez (ESP)	Euskaltel–Euskadi	4h 42' 34"
2	Andreas Klöden (GER)	Team RadioShack	s.t.
3	Alexander Vinokourov (KAZ)	Astana	s.t.
4	Joaquim Rodríguez (ESP)	Team Katusha	s.t.
5	Ryder Hesjedal (CAN)	Garmin–Cervélo	s.t.
6	Xavier Tondó (ESP)	Movistar Team	s.t.
7	Chris Horner (USA)	Team RadioShack	s.t.
8	Robert Gesink (NED)	Rabobank	s.t.
9	Beñat Intxausti (ESP)	Movistar Team	s.t.
10	David López García (ESP)	Movistar Team	s.t.

General Classification after Stage 4

	Rider	Team	Time
1	Joaquim Rodríguez (ESP)	Team Katusha	17h 12' 43"
2	Andreas Klöden (GER)	Team RadioShack	+ 0"
3	Samuel Sánchez (ESP)	Euskaltel–Euskadi	+ 0"
4	Chris Horner (USA)	Team RadioShack	+ 1"
5	Ryder Hesjedal (CAN)	Garmin–Cervélo	+ 6"
6	Xavier Tondó (ESP)	Movistar Team	+ 6"
7	Robert Gesink (NED)	Rabobank	+ 6"
8	David López García (ESP)	Movistar Team	+ 6"
9	Beñat Intxausti (ESP)	Movistar Team	+ 9"
10	Alexander Vinokourov (KAZ)	Astana	+ 10"

=== Stage 5 ===
8 April 2011 – Eibar to Zalla, 177 km (110.0 mi)

Stage 5 result

	Rider	Team	Time
1	Francesco Gavazzi (ITA)	Lampre–ISD	4h 27' 03"
2	Kristof Vandewalle (BEL)	Quick-Step	s.t.
3	John Gadret (FRA)	Ag2r–La Mondiale	s.t.
4	Pim Ligthart (NED)	Vacansoleil–DCM	s.t.
5	Egoitz García (ESP)	Caja Rural	s.t.
6	Vasil Kiryienka (BLR)	Movistar Team	s.t.
7	Ryder Hesjedal (CAN)	Garmin–Cervélo	s.t.
8	Damiano Caruso (ITA)	Liquigas–Cannondale	s.t.
9	Chris Horner (USA)	Team RadioShack	s.t.
10	Samuel Sánchez (ESP)	Euskaltel–Euskadi	s.t.

General Classification after Stage 5

	Rider	Team	Time
1	Joaquim Rodríguez (ESP)	Team Katusha	21h 39' 46"
2	Andreas Klöden (GER)	Team RadioShack	+ 0"
3	Samuel Sánchez (ESP)	Euskaltel–Euskadi	+ 0"
4	Chris Horner (USA)	Team RadioShack	+ 1"
5	Ryder Hesjedal (CAN)	Garmin–Cervélo	+ 6"
6	Xavier Tondó (ESP)	Movistar Team	+ 6"
7	David López García (ESP)	Movistar Team	+ 6"
8	Robert Gesink (NED)	Rabobank	+ 6"
9	Beñat Intxausti (ESP)	Movistar Team	+ 9"
10	Alexander Vinokourov (KAZ)	Astana	+ 10"

=== Stage 6 ===
9 April 2011 – Zalla, 24 km (14.9 mi), individual time trial (ITT)

Stage 6 result

	Rider	Team	Time
1	Tony Martin (GER)	HTC–Highroad	32' 16"
2	Andreas Klöden (GER)	Team RadioShack	+ 9"
3	Marco Pinotti (ITA)	HTC–Highroad	+ 24"
4	Jakob Fuglsang (DEN)	Leopard Trek	+ 29"
5	Andrew Talansky (USA)	Garmin–Cervélo	+ 42"
6	Maxime Monfort (BEL)	Leopard Trek	+ 48"
7	Robert Gesink (NED)	Rabobank	+ 50"
8	Richie Porte (AUS)	Saxo Bank–SunGard	+ 53"
9	Chris Horner (USA)	Team RadioShack	+ 55"
10	Vasil Kiryienka (BLR)	Movistar Team	+ 1' 00"

Final General Classification

	Rider	Team	Time
1	Andreas Klöden (GER)	Team RadioShack	22h 12' 11"
2	Chris Horner (USA)	Team RadioShack	+ 47"
3	Robert Gesink (NED)	Rabobank	+ 47"
4	Beñat Intxausti (ESP)	Movistar Team	+ 1' 03"
5	Xavier Tondó (ESP)	Movistar Team	+ 1' 03"
6	Samuel Sánchez (ESP)	Euskaltel–Euskadi	+ 1' 08"
7	David López García (ESP)	Movistar Team	+ 1' 28"
8	Alexander Vinokourov (KAZ)	Astana	+ 1' 31"
9	Ryder Hesjedal (CAN)	Garmin–Cervélo	+ 1' 49"
10	Vasil Kiryienka (BLR)	Movistar Team	+ 1' 54"

== Classification leadership table ==
In the Tour of the Basque Country, four different jerseys were awarded. For the general classification, calculated by adding each cyclist's finishing times on each stage, the leader received a yellow jersey. This classification was considered the most important of the Tour of the Basque Country, and the winner was considered the winner of the race itself.

Additionally, there was a points classification, which awarded a white jersey. In the points classification, cyclists received points for finishing in the top fifteen in a stage. The stage win awarded 25 points, second place awarded 20 points, third 16, fourth 14, fifth 12, sixth 10 and one point fewer per place down the line, to a single point for fifteenth.

There was also a mountains classification, which awarded a red jersey. In the mountains classification, points were won by reaching the top of a mountain before other cyclists. All climbs were categorised, first, second, or third-category, with more points available for the higher-categorised climbs.

The fourth jersey represented the sprints classification, which awarded a blue jersey. In the sprint classification, cyclists received points for being one of the first three in intermediate sprints, with three points awarded for first place, two for second, and one for third.

Stage	Winner	General Classification	Points Classification	Mountains Classification	Sprints Classification	Team Classification
1	Joaquim Rodríguez	Joaquim Rodríguez	Joaquim Rodríguez	Mathieu Perget	Bram Tankink	Movistar Team
2	Vasil Kiryienka	Andreas Klöden	Andreas Klöden	Maxim Iglinsky	Bram Tankink	Movistar Team
3	Alexander Vinokourov	Joaquim Rodríguez	Joaquim Rodríguez	Amaël Moinard	Bram Tankink	Movistar Team
4	Samuel Sánchez	Joaquim Rodríguez	Andreas Klöden	Michael Albasini	Bram Tankink	Movistar Team
5	Francesco Gavazzi	Joaquim Rodríguez	Andreas Klöden	Michael Albasini	Bram Tankink	Movistar Team
6	Tony Martin	Andreas Klöden	Andreas Klöden	Michael Albasini	Bram Tankink	Movistar Team
Final		Andreas Klöden	Andreas Klöden	Michael Albasini	Bram Tankink	Movistar Team
