= 2010 Vuelta a Burgos =

Race details
- Dates: 4–8 August 2010
- Stages: 5
- Distance: 657.3 km (408.4 mi)
- Winning time: 16h 15' 38"

Results
| | Winner | Samuel Sánchez (ESP) | (Euskaltel–Euskadi) |
| | Second | Ezequiel Mosquera (ESP) | (Xacobeo–Galicia) |
| | Third | Vincenzo Nibali (ITA) | (Liquigas–Doimo) |

The 2010 Vuelta a Burgos was the 32nd edition of the Vuelta a Burgos road cycling stage race, which was held from 4 August to 8 August 2010. The race started at Villasana de Mena and finished at Lagunas de Neila. The race was won by Samuel Sánchez of the Euskaltel–Euskadi team.

== General classification ==
Final general classification

| Rank | Rider | Team | Time |
|---|---|---|---|
| 1 | Samuel Sánchez (ESP) | Euskaltel–Euskadi | 16h 15' 38" |
| 2 | Ezequiel Mosquera (ESP) | Xacobeo–Galicia | + 1" |
| 3 | Vincenzo Nibali (ITA) | Liquigas–Doimo | + 21" |
| 4 | Oliver Zaugg (SUI) | Liquigas–Doimo | + 37" |
| 5 | Morris Possoni (ITA) | Team Sky | + 41" |
| 6 | Iván Gutiérrez (ESP) | Caisse d'Epargne | + 44" |
| 7 | Giampaolo Caruso (ITA) | Team Katusha | + 45" |
| 8 | Steven Kruijswijk (NED) | Rabobank | + 56" |
| 9 | Igor Antón (ESP) | Euskaltel–Euskadi | + 57" |
| 10 | Laurens ten Dam (NED) | Rabobank | + 1' 10" |
