= Beñat Intxausti =

Spanish road bicycle racer

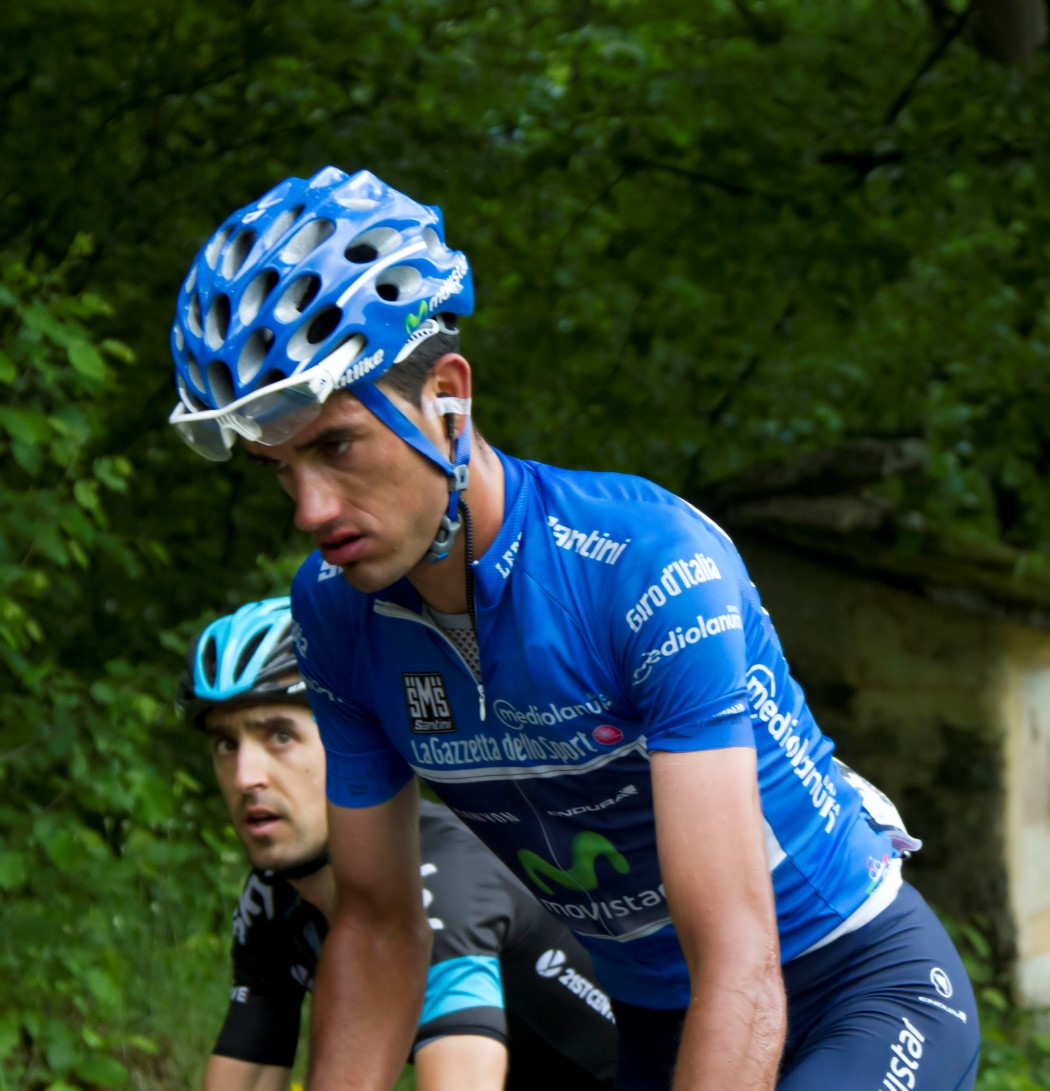
- Intxausti at the 2015 Giro d'Italia

Personal information
- Full name: Beñat Intxausti Elorriaga
- Born: 20 March 1986 (age 40) Amorebieta-Etxano, Spain
- Height: 1.75 m (5 ft 9 in)
- Weight: 61 kg (134 lb)

Cycling career
- Sport: Cycling
- Current team: Retired
- Discipline: Road
- Role: Rider
- Rider type: All-rounder

Amateur team
- 2005–2006: Seguros Bilbao

Professional teams
- 2007: Nicolas Mateos
- 2008–2009: Saunier Duval–Scott
- 2010: Euskaltel–Euskadi
- 2011–2015: Movistar Team
- 2016–2018: Team Sky
- 2019: Euskadi–Murias

Major wins
- Grand Tours Giro d'Italia 2 individual stages (2013, 2015) Stage races Tour of Beijing (2013)

Beñat Intxausti Elorriaga (born 20 March 1986) is a Spanish former professional road bicycle racer, who rode professionally between 2007 and 2019 for the Nicolas Mateos, Fuji–Servetto, Euskaltel–Euskadi, Movistar Team, Team Sky and Euskadi–Murias teams.

== Career ==
Intxausti was born in Amorebieta-Etxano, Biscay. In 2012, he won the Vuelta a Asturias and finished 10th overall in the Vuelta a España despite working for his team leader, Alejandro Valverde. In 2013, Intxausti won stage 16 in the Giro d'Italia after being part of a breakaway and later finished 8th overall. He also had the leaders' jersey for one day. In the Tour of Beijing, Intxausti won the only mountain stage and claimed the general classification victory.

After five seasons with Movistar, in September 2015 Team Sky announced that Intxausti would join them in 2016 on an initial two-year contract. However, after a promising start to 2016, Intxausti's career became blighted with illness and was unable to race for extended periods. In 2019, he moved to the lower-level Euskadi–Murias team. In January 2020, he announced his retirement from cycling.

== Major results ==
2005
1st Stage 3 Vuelta a Salamanca
2006
1st Memorial Avelino Camacho
2nd Overall Bidasoa Itzulia

1st Stage 3

5th Clásica Memorial Txuma
2007
5th Overall Tour de l'Avenir
5th La Côte Picarde
2008
8th Klasika Primavera
2009
5th Subida a Urkiola
7th Overall Vuelta a Burgos
8th Overall Vuelta a Andalucía
2010
2nd Overall Tour of the Basque Country
3rd Overall Vuelta a Asturias

1st Stage 3b (ITT)

5th GP Miguel Induráin
7th Trofeo Deia
10th Overall Critérium International
2011
4th Overall Tour of the Basque Country
5th Overall Tour de Romandie
9th Circuito de Getxo
2012
1st Overall Vuelta a Asturias

1st Points classification

10th Overall Vuelta a España

1st Stage 1 (TTT)

2013
1st Overall Tour of Beijing

1st Stage 4

4th Klasika Primavera
8th Overall Giro d'Italia

1st Stage 16
Held after Stage 7

8th Overall Tour of the Basque Country
2014
3rd Overall Tour de Pologne
6th Overall Tour de Romandie
9th Circuito de Getxo
10th Klasika Primavera
2015
Giro d'Italia

1st Stage 8
Held after Stages 8, 11–15

2nd Overall Vuelta a Castilla y León
3rd Overall Vuelta a Andalucía
3rd GP Miguel Induráin
4th Overall Critérium du Dauphiné
6th Trofeo Andratx–Mirador d'es Colomer
2016
3rd Overall Volta a la Comunitat Valenciana

=== General classification results timeline ===
Grand Tour general classification results
Grand Tour	2008	2009	2010	2011	2012	2013	2014	2015
Giro d'Italia	—	—	—	—	38	8	—	29
Tour de France	—	—	—	DNF	—	—	116	—
Vuelta a España	—	60	DNF	86	10	87	—	—
Major stage race general classification results
Race	2008	2009	2010	2011	2012	2013	2014	2015
Paris–Nice	69	—	72	—	—	—	—	DNF
Tirreno–Adriatico	—	—	—	—	24	46	32	—
Volta a Catalunya	—	134	—	31	—	—	—	—
Tour of the Basque Country	83	—	2	4	—	8	48	30
Tour de Romandie	—	—	—	5	—	—	6	—
Critérium du Dauphiné	—	102	—	DNF	—	—	DNF	4
Tour de Suisse	OTL	—	—	—	—	—	—	—

Legend
—	Did not compete
DNF	Did not finish
