= 2011 GP Miguel Induráin =

Race details
- Dates: 2 April 2011
- Stages: 1
- Distance: 179.3 km (111.4 mi)
- Winning time: 4h 42' 47"

Results
	Winner	Samuel Sánchez (ESP)
	Second	Alexandr Kolobnev (RUS)
	Third	Fabian Wegmann (GER)

The 2011 GP Miguel Induráin was the 58th edition of the GP Miguel Induráin cycle race and was held on 2 April 2011. The race started and finished in Estella. The race was won by Samuel Sánchez.

== General classification ==
Final general classification

Rank	Rider	Time
1	Samuel Sánchez (ESP)	4h 42' 47"
2	Alexandr Kolobnev (RUS)	+ 2"
3	Fabian Wegmann (GER)	+ 7"
4	Ryder Hesjedal (CAN)	+ 7"
5	Ángel Madrazo (ESP)	+ 7"
6	Robinson Chalapud (COL)	+ 7"
7	Javier Moreno (ESP)	+ 7"
8	Christophe Le Mével (FRA)	+ 7"
9	Joaquim Rodríguez (ESP)	+ 16"
10	Rinaldo Nocentini (ITA)	+ 16"
