= 2012 Tour of the Basque Country =

2012 UCI World Tour, race 9 of 28
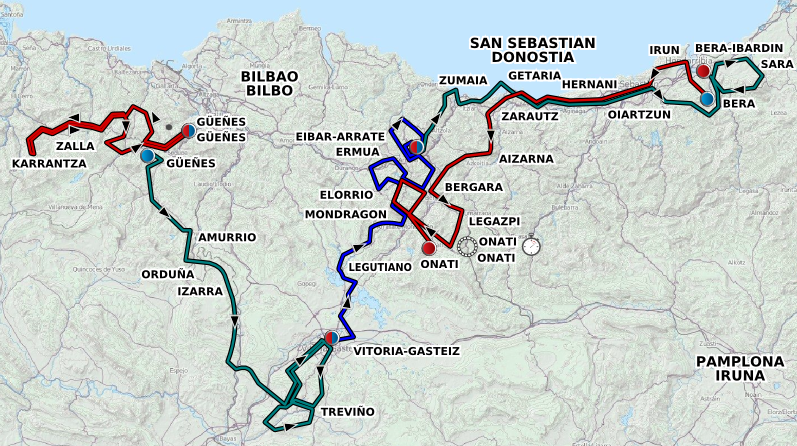

Race details
- Dates: 2–7 April
- Stages: 6
- Distance: 824.6 km (512.4 mi)
- Winning time: 20h 58' 15"

Results
Jersey awarded to the overall winner	Winner	Samuel Sánchez (Spain)	(Euskaltel–Euskadi)
	Second	Joaquim Rodríguez (Spain)	(Team Katusha)
	Third	Bauke Mollema (Netherlands)	(Rabobank)
Jersey awarded to the points classification winner	Points	Samuel Sánchez (Spain)	(Euskaltel–Euskadi)
Jersey awarded to the mountains classification winner	Mountains	Mads Christensen (Denmark)	(Team Saxo Bank)
Jersey awarded to the sprints classification winner	Sprints	Marco Pinotti (Italy)	(BMC Racing Team)
	Team	Team Katusha	

The 2012 Tour of the Basque Country was the 52nd running of the Tour of the Basque Country cycling stage race. It started on 2 April in Güeñes and ended on 7 April in Oñati, and consisted of six stages, including a race-concluding individual time trial. It was the ninth race of the 2012 UCI World Tour season.

The race was won by Spain's Samuel Sánchez of the Euskaltel–Euskadi team, after winning two stages including the final stage time trial, to take the general classification on the final day. Sánchez won the general classification by 12 seconds over runner-up Joaquim Rodríguez of Team Katusha, who had led into the final stage; Sánchez also beat Rodríguez to the points classification title. Third place was taken by Rabobank's Bauke Mollema after he finished second to Sánchez in the time trial, and gained sufficient time to move up from eleventh overnight. In the race's other classifications, Marco Pinotti of the BMC Racing Team won the green jersey for the most points gained in intermediate sprints, while Team Saxo Bank rider Mads Christensen won the King of the Mountains classification, and Team Katusha finished at the head of the teams classification.

== Schedule ==
After the race was bailed out by Spanish bank Banco Sabadell on 5 March, race organisers announced the itinerary ten days later.

Stage	Route	Distance	Date	Winner
1	Güeñes to Güeñes	152 km (94.4 mi)	2 April	José Joaquín Rojas (ESP)
2	Güeñes to Vitoria-Gasteiz	165.7 km (103.0 mi)	3 April	Daryl Impey (RSA)
3	Vitoria-Gasteiz to Eibar	154 km (95.7 mi)	4 April	Samuel Sánchez (ESP)
4	Eibar to Bera-Ibardin	151 km (93.8 mi)	5 April	Joaquim Rodríguez (ESP)
5	Bera-Ibardin to Oñati	183 km (113.7 mi)	6 April	Joaquim Rodríguez (ESP)
6 (ITT)	Oñati to Oñati	18.9 km (11.7 mi)	7 April	Samuel Sánchez (ESP)

== Participating teams ==
As the Tour of the Basque Country was a UCI World Tour event, all 18 UCI ProTeams were invited automatically and obligated to send a squad. Two other squads were given wildcard places into the race, and as such, formed the event's 20-team peloton.

The 20 teams that competed in the race were:

- Ag2r–La Mondiale
- Astana
- BMC Racing Team
- Caja Rural
- Euskaltel–Euskadi
- FDJ–BigMat
- Garmin–Barracuda
- GreenEDGE
- Team Katusha
- Lampre–ISD
- Liquigas–Cannondale
- Lotto–Belisol
- Movistar Team
- Omega Pharma–Quick-Step
- Rabobank
- RadioShack–Nissan
- Team Saxo Bank
- Team Sky
- Utensilnord–Named
- Vacansoleil–DCM

== Stages ==
=== Stage 1 ===
2 April 2012 — Güeñes to Güeñes, 152 km (94.4 mi)

Two riders – Utensilnord–Named's Davide Mucelli and David de la Fuente of Caja Rural – advanced clear of the main field at the 20 km (12.4 mi) mark of the stage, as they reached the race's first categorised climb, the third-category Alto Humaran; they managed to extend their advantage to a maximum of over five minutes at one point during the early running of the stage. Euskaltel–Euskadi and Astana came to the front of the peloton towards the midpoint of the stage; making their move on the Alto del Suceso, another categorised climb with de la Fuente taking the maximum points on offer. Mucelli and de la Fuente's advantage had dropped to around two-and-a-half minutes, before spanning back out to the four-minute mark with 50 km (31.1 mi) remaining.

Rabobank then established themselves on the front of the pack; protecting their main sprinter for the race, Michael Matthews. As such, by the time the race had advanced another 20 km (12.4 mi) of the parcours, the duo out front only held a lead of around a minute over the advancing peloton. The catch was inevitable, and just shy of 15 km (9.3 mi) remaining, Mucelli and de la Fuente were brought back by the field with Lotto–Belisol on the front. On the final climb of the day, the Alto de San Comse, a crash in the pack delayed several riders, with the peloton momentarily stalling the pace in the mayhem. This delay allowed Wesley Sulzberger (GreenEDGE) to sneak off the front; the first of several mini-attacks that were ultimately unsuccessful on the run in to Güeñes. Liquigas–Cannondale looked to set up the sprint finish for their rider Daniele Ratto, but he faded in the closing stages; Vacansoleil–DCM's Wout Poels launched his attack for the line, but he was usurped by the Spanish national champion, Movistar Team's José Joaquín Rojas, who earned his first victory of 2012 at the finish.

Stage 1 Result

	Rider	Team	Time
1	José Joaquín Rojas (ESP)	Movistar Team	3h 57' 44"
2	Wout Poels (NED)	Vacansoleil–DCM	s.t.
3	Fabian Wegmann (GER)	Garmin–Barracuda	s.t.
4	Daniele Ratto (ITA)	Liquigas–Cannondale	s.t.
5	Arthur Vichot (FRA)	FDJ–BigMat	s.t.
6	Ryder Hesjedal (CAN)	Garmin–Barracuda	s.t.
7	Gianni Meersman (BEL)	Lotto–Belisol	s.t.
8	Gorka Izagirre (ESP)	Euskaltel–Euskadi	s.t.
9	Francesco Gavazzi (ITA)	Astana	s.t.
10	Paolo Bailetti (ITA)	Utensilnord–Named	s.t.

General Classification after Stage 1

	Rider	Team	Time
1	José Joaquín Rojas (ESP)	Movistar Team	3h 57' 44"
2	Wout Poels (NED)	Vacansoleil–DCM	+ 0"
3	Fabian Wegmann (GER)	Garmin–Barracuda	+ 0"
4	Daniele Ratto (ITA)	Liquigas–Cannondale	+ 0"
5	Arthur Vichot (FRA)	FDJ–BigMat	+ 0"
6	Ryder Hesjedal (CAN)	Garmin–Barracuda	+ 0"
7	Gianni Meersman (BEL)	Lotto–Belisol	+ 0"
8	Gorka Izagirre (ESP)	Euskaltel–Euskadi	+ 0"
9	Francesco Gavazzi (ITA)	Astana	+ 0"
10	Paolo Bailetti (ITA)	Utensilnord–Named	+ 0"

=== Stage 2 ===
3 April 2012 — Güeñes to Vitoria-Gasteiz, 165.7 km (103.0 mi)

Heavy rain greeted the riders at the start of the stage, with an early climb of the third-category Alto de San Cosme coming after just 4 km (2.5 mi) of the parcours. It was on the descent from the climb that the primary breakaway of the stage began to form; Jérôme Pineau of Omega Pharma–Quick-Step went clear with FDJ–BigMat's Thibaut Pinot and Team Saxo Bank rider Mads Christensen. The trio were later joined by another pair of riders – representing the wildcard teams in the race, Utensilnord–Named and Caja Rural – as Gabriele Bosisio and Julián Sánchez both ventured off the front of the peloton, eventually catching up with the breakaway after 32 km (19.9 mi). Of the five members of the breakaway, only two – Pinot and Pineau – had finished in the same time as stage one winner, Movistar Team's José Joaquín Rojas.

As such, Movistar Team were driving the pace on the front of the main pack, in order to keep within a suitable distance of the five leaders; the gap at that point was around the seven-minute mark. Pinot continued to close in on David de la Fuente (Caja Rural) and the mountains classification lead, as he claimed maximum points on offer at the Alto de La Barrerilla and the Alto de Zaldiaran. Euskaltel–Euskadi, GreenEDGE and Rabobank all placed riders towards the front of the peloton, to help close the gap between the leaders and themselves. The gap had been cut to just over five minutes by the time the race reached the next categorised climb, the Alto de Vitoria, with Pinot again leading the breakaway across the summit. More teams sent riders forward to help with the work to bring back the leaders, taking back four minutes from the next 30 km (18.6 mi); the lead quintet held an advantage of just 1' 22" at the summit of the Alto de San Martin.

Alas, the breakaway was not to succeed; with 13 km (8.1 mi) remaining of the stage, and on the second climb of the Alto de Zaldiaran – the final climb of the stage – the peloton brought back the lead quintet, allowing more riders to try an attacking move in the closing stages, on the run-in to Vitoria-Gasteiz. With GreenEDGE leading the main pack, another five-man move tried to get clear on the climb itself, including one of the team's riders, Wesley Sulzberger. Also part of the move were Pinot's team-mate Anthony Roux, Astana's Alexsandr Dyachenko, Team Katusha rider Eduard Vorganov and Dominik Nerz of Liquigas–Cannondale. Nerz then attacked his companions, but all five were caught before the summit of the climb. Lampre–ISD, Astana and GreenEDGE all had riders towards the front of the pack, many expecting a bunch sprint for the stage honours. As it transpired, an opportune move by Daryl Impey at the flamme rouge proved fruitful, and he managed to stay clear of the ever-closing pack to take his first victory for GreenEDGE, and the team's seventh of the year. Team-mate Allan Davis, like Impey, crossed the line arms aloft in second place ahead of Team Sky's Davide Appollonio and Rojas, who maintained his overall lead.

Stage 2 Result

	Rider	Team	Time
1	Daryl Impey (RSA)	GreenEDGE	4h 10' 07"
2	Allan Davis (AUS)	GreenEDGE	s.t.
3	Davide Appollonio (ITA)	Team Sky	s.t.
4	José Joaquín Rojas (ESP)	Movistar Team	s.t.
5	Michael Matthews (AUS)	Rabobank	s.t.
6	Daniele Ratto (ITA)	Liquigas–Cannondale	s.t.
7	Francesco Gavazzi (ITA)	Astana	s.t.
8	Fabian Wegmann (GER)	Garmin–Barracuda	s.t.
9	Gianni Meersman (BEL)	Lotto–Belisol	s.t.
10	Daniele Pietropolli (ITA)	Lampre–ISD	s.t.

General Classification after Stage 2

	Rider	Team	Time
1	José Joaquín Rojas (ESP)	Movistar Team	8h 07' 51"
2	Daniele Ratto (ITA)	Liquigas–Cannondale	+ 0"
3	Fabian Wegmann (GER)	Garmin–Barracuda	+ 0"
4	Daryl Impey (RSA)	GreenEDGE	+ 0"
5	Francesco Gavazzi (ITA)	Astana	+ 0"
6	Gianni Meersman (BEL)	Lotto–Belisol	+ 0"
7	Ryder Hesjedal (CAN)	Garmin–Barracuda	+ 0"
8	Michael Matthews (AUS)	Rabobank	+ 0"
9	Davide Appollonio (ITA)	Team Sky	+ 0"
10	Mauro Santambrogio (ITA)	BMC Racing Team	+ 0"

=== Stage 3 ===
4 April 2012 — Vitoria-Gasteiz to Eibar, 154 km (95.7 mi)

The race's queen stage consisted of seven categorised climbs over the 154 km (95.7 mi) parcours, including two first-category climbs; the Alto de Ixua and also the climb of the Alto de Usartza, a climb with gradient in places at over 11%, cresting out with 1.4 km (0.9 mi) remaining of the stage. The Usartza featured for the third successive year; Samuel Sánchez (Euskaltel–Euskadi) was the rider in which most observers deemed to be the favourite for the stage, as he had won each of the previous two finishes to be held in Eibar. Mini-attacks set the course for the stage as the field remained as one, for much of the first half-hour of racing; it was not until after 24 km (14.9 mi) that the stage's primary breakaway had been formed.

Five riders went clear; two of whom had previously been in the breakaway in the race, Davide Mucelli of Utensilnord–Named and Team Saxo Bank's Mads Christensen. The pair were joined by FDJ–BigMat's Jussi Veikkanen, Movistar Team rider José Herrada and Antonio Piedra of Caja Rural, eventually gaining an overall advantage of five-and-a-half minutes over the peloton. By this time, the lead quintet had split into two; Herrada and Christensen had accelerated away from their companions and were later joined by Veikkanen, who had been dropped in the initial move along with Piedra and Mucelli. Christensen led over the next two categorised climbs, before Herrada accelerated his pace and attacked off the front on the first of the first-category climb of Alto de Ixua.

Team Katusha were prominent in attempting to break away from the main field, utilising Alberto Losada, Giampaolo Caruso and Ángel Vicioso in a bid to get clear ahead of the finish. Caruso and Vicioso closed in on the leaders out front, passing Christensen on the road before eventually catching Herrada with 20 km (12.4 mi) remaining of the parcours; however their advantage over the main pack had dwindled considerably as the trio were less than a minute clear of the peloton, led by Euskaltel–Euskadi for their captain, Sánchez. The gap was eighteen seconds at the final intermediate sprint point in Eibar, with Liquigas–Cannondale helping out with the chase, and the trio were caught at the base of the Alto de Usartza. Chris Horner (RadioShack–Nissan) then attacked with Astana's Robert Kišerlovski, and were joined by another Team Katusha rider, Joaquim Rodríguez and Lampre–ISD's Michele Scarponi. Sánchez bridged up to the leaders, and as Kišerlovski and Scarponi struggled, it was left to Sánchez, Rodríguez and Horner to contest for the stage honours. Sánchez attacked in the closing stages and did enough to beat Rodríguez and Horner – to win for the third successive year – with Bauke Mollema (Rabobank) leading the chasers over the line, 12 seconds in arrears of Sánchez, who took the race lead from Movistar Team's José Joaquín Rojas as Rojas lost over 16 minutes on the stage.

Stage 3 Result

	Rider	Team	Time
1	Samuel Sánchez (ESP)	Euskaltel–Euskadi	3h 58' 15"
2	Joaquim Rodríguez (ESP)	Team Katusha	s.t.
3	Chris Horner (USA)	RadioShack–Nissan	s.t.
4	Bauke Mollema (NED)	Rabobank	+ 12"
5	Damiano Cunego (ITA)	Lampre–ISD	+ 12"
6	Tony Martin (GER)	Omega Pharma–Quick-Step	+ 12"
7	Michele Scarponi (ITA)	Lampre–ISD	+ 12"
8	Sergio Henao (COL)	Team Sky	+ 12"
9	Robert Kišerlovski (CRO)	Astana	+ 12"
10	Lars Petter Nordhaug (NOR)	Team Sky	+ 12"

General Classification after Stage 3

	Rider	Team	Time
1	Samuel Sánchez (ESP)	Euskaltel–Euskadi	12h 06' 06"
2	Chris Horner (USA)	RadioShack–Nissan	+ 0"
3	Joaquim Rodríguez (ESP)	Team Katusha	+ 0"
4	Ryder Hesjedal (CAN)	Garmin–Barracuda	+ 12"
5	Wout Poels (NED)	Vacansoleil–DCM	+ 12"
6	Damiano Cunego (ITA)	Lampre–ISD	+ 12"
7	Vasil Kiryienka (BLR)	Movistar Team	+ 12"
8	Jurgen Van den Broeck (BEL)	Lotto–Belisol	+ 12"
9	Robert Kišerlovski (CRO)	Astana	+ 12"
10	Tony Martin (GER)	Omega Pharma–Quick-Step	+ 12"

=== Stage 4 ===
5 April 2012 — Eibar to Bera-Ibardin, 151 km (93.8 mi)

Mini-attacks were again key to the first hour of racing on the fourth stage; with cool and damp conditions again for the riders, it was almost a carbon-copy to what had occurred on the previous stage. Evgeni Petrov was the most active rider in that first hour; after an earlier unsuccessful attempt to get clear on the first of the stage's five categorised climbs – the Alto de Itziar – at the 23.5 km (14.6 mi) mark, Petrov did manage to clip clear of the peloton almost 20 km (12.4 mi) later to initiate the breakaway move. Over the next few kilometres, Petrov was joined by four other riders; Maciej Paterski (Liquigas–Cannondale) moved forward first at 45 km (28.0 mi), with Movistar Team's Ángel Madrazo, Diego Ulissi of Lampre–ISD, and Caja Rural rider Marcos García joining Petrov and Paterski 3 km (1.9 mi) later. Euskaltel–Euskadi were keeping their riders towards the front of the field in support of their team captain, and the overall race leader Samuel Sánchez; in effect, stopping the breakaway from getting too far clear on the stage, and were less than two minutes behind at the second climb of the day, the Alto de Aritxulegi.

Wesley Sulzberger made his third attack of the race from the break for GreenEDGE, and was joined by team-mate Simon Clarke as they looked to bridge up to the breakaway; the pair caught García on the descent, after he had been dropped by his four companions. With the climb of the Alto de Agiña coming several kilometres later on the parcours, fresher legs for Sulzberger and Clarke told as they brought themselves, and Garciá, up to the breakaway and reforming the move as a seven-man group. Four riders attacked on the descent, although only one – Patxi Vila (Utensilnord–Named) – was there for a move to catch the breakaway as Team Katusha's Giampaolo Caruso and Euskaltel–Euskadi pair Igor Antón and Gorka Verdugo were there to protect their respective team leaders Joaquim Rodríguez and Sánchez. Vila caught the breakaway on the first ascent of the finishing climb, sans the steep finish reserved for the second and finishing ascent, while two other riders attacked on the Alto de Ibardin; Volta a Catalunya winner Michael Albasini (GreenEDGE) and Team Saxo Bank's Nicki Sørensen had crossed the summit marginally ahead of the peloton, before catching the lead octet with 25 km (15.5 mi) to go.

With several fresher riders in the breakaway, the move started to fracture in the terrain and by the time the move reached the Alto de Ibardin for the second and final time with 6 km (3.7 mi) to go, only five riders remained in the move: Albasini, Clarke, Paterski, Petrov and Sørensen. Clarke and Paterski were dropped on the climb itself as Omega Pharma–Quick-Step looked to establish themselves on the front of the pack along with Team Katusha, looking to position Tony Martin in a prime position to attack late on. Albasini was caught with 2.6 km (1.6 mi) to go, and a lead group of some 25 riders was established for the closing stages. Maxime Monfort and Fränk Schleck looked to set the pace for their RadioShack–Nissan team-mate Chris Horner, while Simon Špilak looked to do so for Rodríguez. Vacansoleil–DCM's Wout Poels and Team Sky's Sergio Henao both looked to go clear in the final kilometre, but Rodríguez prevailed comfortably in the closing stages – an 18% gradient in some places – to win by nine seconds, taking the overall lead from Sánchez, who was second ahead of Henao and Astana's Robert Kišerlovski.

Stage 4 Result

	Rider	Team	Time
1	Joaquim Rodríguez (ESP)	Team Katusha	3h 55' 56"
2	Samuel Sánchez (ESP)	Euskaltel–Euskadi	+ 9"
3	Sergio Henao (COL)	Team Sky	+ 12"
4	Robert Kišerlovski (CRO)	Astana	+ 12"
5	Lars Petter Nordhaug (NOR)	Team Sky	+ 16"
6	Michele Scarponi (ITA)	Lampre–ISD	+ 16"
7	Jurgen Van den Broeck (BEL)	Lotto–Belisol	+ 16"
8	Wout Poels (NED)	Vacansoleil–DCM	+ 16"
9	Simon Špilak (SLO)	Team Katusha	+ 16"
10	Ryder Hesjedal (CAN)	Garmin–Barracuda	+ 16"

General Classification after Stage 4

	Rider	Team	Time
1	Joaquim Rodríguez (ESP)	Team Katusha	16h 02' 02"
2	Samuel Sánchez (ESP)	Euskaltel–Euskadi	+ 9"
3	Chris Horner (USA)	RadioShack–Nissan	+ 21"
4	Robert Kišerlovski (CRO)	Astana	+ 24"
5	Sergio Henao (COL)	Team Sky	+ 24"
6	Ryder Hesjedal (CAN)	Garmin–Barracuda	+ 28"
7	Wout Poels (NED)	Vacansoleil–DCM	+ 28"
8	Jurgen Van den Broeck (BEL)	Lotto–Belisol	+ 28"
9	Lars Petter Nordhaug (NOR)	Team Sky	+ 28"
10	Michele Scarponi (ITA)	Lampre–ISD	+ 28"

=== Stage 5 ===
6 April 2012 — Bera-Ibardin to Oñati, 183 km (113.7 mi)

Again, rain made conditions slightly treacherous on the stage itself, and may have contributed to the fact that there were no successful attacks by the breakaway until near the midpoint of the day's running, after almost two hours of racing. At around 80 km (49.7 mi), an initial four-rider move went clear, consisting of FDJ–BigMat rider Benoît Vaugrenard, Lampre–ISD's Diego Ulissi, Kevin De Weert of Omega Pharma–Quick-Step and Caja Rural got a rider into the break once again – as they had done on every stage to that point – with Hernâni Brôco representing the team this time around. Not long later, twelve other riders from nine more teams brought reinforcement to the lead quartet and soon accelerated their pace to get a gap over the main field.

The sixteen had been over five minutes clear at one point, but the bunch closed the gap quickly after that; it was 3' 15" at the summit of the stage's third climb, the Alto de Elosua. The breakaway's advantage continued to diminish and not long after the next categorised climb, the Alto de Descarga where Ulissi had led them across the summit, the move was thwarted as the peloton caught them. A counter-attack of nine riders immediately acted, including Robert Kišerlovski (Astana) who commenced the stage in fourth place in the general classification, trailing overnight leader Joaquim Rodríguez of Team Katusha by just 24 seconds. This move could not gain sufficient ground off the front of the field; 20 km (12.4 mi) after the move had begun, their gap over the main field was just 25 seconds, with the pace being set by Rodríguez's team-mates.

With Kišerlovski being in a prime position overall, he then attacked off the front of the breakaway in order to preserve his position in the rankings. The pace split the remaining breakaway riders apart; BMC Racing Team rider Marco Pinotti, Lampre–ISD's Adriano Malori and Jesús Hernández of Team Saxo Bank chased after Kišerlovski, while the remaining five leaders surrendered back to the peloton. Kišerlovski held a 35-second lead over the main field with 5 km (3.1 mi) to go but was struggling on the uncategorised Garagaltza climb – a 900 m (3,000 ft) climb with an average gradient of 11% – when Rodríguez and Samuel Sánchez (Euskaltel–Euskadi) attacked from the bunch. The top two overall caught Kišerlovski, and tried to distance themselves from him in the closing metres. Rodríguez launched his sprint first and just held off Sánchez at the line to keep his lead at nine seconds going into the time trial. Kišerlovski finished two seconds behind in third, but moved into third place overall. Chris Horner (RadioShack–Nissan) gave up 21 seconds to Kišerlovski, and 23 to Rodríguez and Sánchez, dropping to tenth overall.

Stage 5 Result

	Rider	Team	Time
1	Joaquim Rodríguez (ESP)	Team Katusha	4h 27' 16"
2	Samuel Sánchez (ESP)	Euskaltel–Euskadi	s.t.
3	Robert Kišerlovski (CRO)	Astana	+ 2"
4	Vasil Kiryienka (BLR)	Movistar Team	+ 5"
5	Lars Petter Nordhaug (NOR)	Team Sky	+ 5"
6	Daniele Ratto (ITA)	Liquigas–Cannondale	+ 5"
7	Michele Scarponi (ITA)	Lampre–ISD	+ 5"
8	Damiano Cunego (ITA)	Lampre–ISD	+ 7"
9	Rui Costa (POR)	Movistar Team	+ 7"
10	Jean-Christophe Péraud (FRA)	Ag2r–La Mondiale	+ 7"

General Classification after Stage 5

	Rider	Team	Time
1	Joaquim Rodríguez (ESP)	Team Katusha	20h 29' 18"
2	Samuel Sánchez (ESP)	Euskaltel–Euskadi	+ 9"
3	Robert Kišerlovski (CRO)	Astana	+ 26"
4	Lars Petter Nordhaug (NOR)	Team Sky	+ 33"
5	Michele Scarponi (ITA)	Lampre–ISD	+ 33"
6	Sergio Henao (COL)	Team Sky	+ 34"
7	Jurgen Van den Broeck (BEL)	Lotto–Belisol	+ 35"
8	Ryder Hesjedal (CAN)	Garmin–Barracuda	+ 40"
9	Damiano Cunego (ITA)	Lampre–ISD	+ 40"
10	Chris Horner (USA)	RadioShack–Nissan	+ 44"

=== Stage 6 ===
7 April 2012 — Oñati, 18.9 km (11.7 mi) individual time trial (ITT)

As was expected, the battle for the race victory came down to the final stage of the race; a technical 18.9 km (11.7 mi) individual time trial around Oñati. On the parcours were three steep climbs, made tougher due to the continued unsettled weather conditions in the Basque country; damp roads greeted the riders, and the stage favourite Tony Martin – the world time trial champion – riding for the Omega Pharma–Quick-Step team crashed during a reconnaissance overview of the course. As was customary of time trial stages, cyclists set off in reverse order from where they were ranked in the general classification at the end of the previous stage. Thus, Travis Meyer of GreenEDGE, who, in 122nd place, trailed overall leader Joaquim Rodríguez (Team Katusha) by one hour, three minutes and forty-four seconds, was the first rider to set off on the final stage. Meyer recorded a time of 29' 12" for the course; a time that was ultimately good enough for him to place inside the top ten of the stage classification.

Meyer held the lead for around twenty minutes until Stef Clement assumed the lead for Rabobank; the Dutch national champion had trailed his rival by three seconds at the midway intermediate point – at 9.8 km (6.1 mi) – but put in a stronger second half of the course to overhaul the time of Meyer, recording a time of 29' 10". Clement, who had been 102nd overnight, managed to hold his stage lead well into the top 40 riders; Moreno Moser got closest to his time to that point, coming within six seconds, but eventually settled for a ninth-place finish on the stage for Liquigas–Cannondale. Clement's time was eventually beaten by BMC Racing Team's Marco Pinotti, wearing the green jersey as the sprints classification leader. Pinotti, a five-time Italian champion in the discipline, recorded a similar time to Clement at the intermediate point but went quicker in the second half to end up seven seconds ahead at the finish, in a time of 29' 03".

Martin then beat that time later, becoming the first rider to break 29 minutes for the course; in a time of 28' 55", later stating that the time trial was "dangerous" in places. Bauke Mollema, a team-mate of Clement, then put in one of the strongest time trials of his career to beat Martin's time by a solitary second, having received extra guidance in his time-trialling abilities over the off-season. Mollema's performance eventually lifted him onto the podium in the general classification, after gaining sufficient time over eight riders that had been ahead of him prior to the stage. It came down to the top two overall for the race honours: Samuel Sánchez (Euskaltel–Euskadi) and Rodríguez. Sánchez's greater proficiency in the discipline compared to Rodríguez proved vital; although he trailed Mollema at the intermediate sprint, Sánchez repeated the feat of many other riders as a strong second half of the course gave him the stage victory, six seconds quicker than Mollema. Rodríguez also put in a strong performance, finishing 21 seconds slower than Sánchez, giving the latter victory by nine seconds overall; despite this, Rodríguez was pleased with his stage effort.

Stage 6 Result

	Rider	Team	Time
1	Samuel Sánchez (ESP)	Euskaltel–Euskadi	28' 48"
2	Bauke Mollema (NED)	Rabobank	+ 6"
3	Tony Martin (GER)	Omega Pharma–Quick-Step	+ 7"
4	Marco Pinotti (ITA)	BMC Racing Team	+ 15"
5	Damiano Cunego (ITA)	Lampre–ISD	+ 16"
6	Joaquim Rodríguez (ESP)	Team Katusha	+ 21"
7	Stef Clement (NED)	Rabobank	+ 22"
8	Travis Meyer (AUS)	GreenEDGE	+ 24"
9	Moreno Moser (ITA)	Liquigas–Cannondale	+ 28"
10	Jean-Christophe Péraud (FRA)	Ag2r–La Mondiale	+ 31"

Final General Classification

	Rider	Team	Time
1	Samuel Sánchez (ESP)	Euskaltel–Euskadi	20h 58' 15"
2	Joaquim Rodríguez (ESP)	Team Katusha	+ 12"
3	Bauke Mollema (NED)	Rabobank	+ 42"
4	Damiano Cunego (ITA)	Lampre–ISD	+ 47"
5	Tony Martin (GER)	Omega Pharma–Quick-Step	+ 54"
6	Lars Petter Nordhaug (NOR)	Team Sky	+ 1' 03"
7	Jean-Christophe Péraud (FRA)	Ag2r–La Mondiale	+ 1' 07"
8	Michele Scarponi (ITA)	Lampre–ISD	+ 1' 19"
9	Chris Horner (USA)	RadioShack–Nissan	+ 1' 27"
10	Simon Špilak (SLO)	Team Katusha	+ 1' 29"

== Classification leadership table ==
In the 2012 Tour of the Basque Country, four different jerseys were awarded. For the general classification, calculated by adding each cyclist's finishing times on each stage, the leader received a yellow jersey. This classification was considered the most important of the 2012 Tour of the Basque Country, and the winner of the classification was considered the winner of the race.

Additionally, there was a points classification, which awarded a white jersey. In the points classification, cyclists received points for finishing in the top 15 in a stage. For winning a stage, a rider earned 25 points, second place earned 20 points, third 16, fourth 14, fifth 12, sixth 10, and one point fewer per place down to a single point for 15th. There was also a mountains classification, the leadership of which was marked by a blue jersey. In the mountains classification, points were won by reaching the top of a climb before other cyclists, with more points available for the higher-categorised climbs.

The fourth jersey represented the sprints classification, marked by a green jersey. In the sprints classification, cyclists received points for finishing in the top 3 at intermediate sprint points during each stage, with the exception of the final individual time trial stage. There was also a classification for teams, in which the times of the best three cyclists per team on each stage were added together; the leading team at the end of the race was the team with the lowest total time.

Stage	Winner	General Classification	Points Classification	Mountains Classification	Sprints Classification	Team Classification
1	José Joaquín Rojas	José Joaquín Rojas	José Joaquín Rojas	David de la Fuente	Davide Mucelli	Vacansoleil–DCM
2	Daryl Impey	José Joaquín Rojas	José Joaquín Rojas	David de la Fuente	Julián Sánchez	GreenEDGE
3	Samuel Sánchez	Samuel Sánchez	José Joaquín Rojas	Mads Christensen	Mads Christensen	Team Katusha
4	Joaquim Rodríguez	Joaquim Rodríguez	Samuel Sánchez	Mads Christensen	Mads Christensen	Team Katusha
5	Joaquim Rodríguez	Joaquim Rodríguez	Joaquim Rodríguez	Mads Christensen	Marco Pinotti	Team Sky
6	Samuel Sánchez	Samuel Sánchez	Samuel Sánchez	Mads Christensen	Marco Pinotti	Team Katusha
Final		Samuel Sánchez	Samuel Sánchez	Mads Christensen	Marco Pinotti	Team Katusha
