= 2012 Vuelta a Asturias =

Race details
- Dates: 27–29 April 2012
- Stages: 3
- Distance: 437 km (272 mi)
- Winning time: 10h 55' 33"

Results
Jersey awarded to the overall winner	Winner	Beñat Intxausti (ESP)	(Movistar Team)
	Second	David de la Cruz (ESP)	(Caja Rural)
	Third	Rémy Di Gregorio (FRA)	(Cofidis)
Jersey awarded to the points classification winner	Points	Beñat Intxausti (ESP)	(Movistar Team)
Jersey awarded to the mountains classification winner	Mountains	Walter Pedraza (COL)	(EPM–UNE)
Jersey awarded to the sprints classification winner	Sprints	Alexander Ryabkin (RUS)	(Caja Rural)
	Team	Movistar Team	

The 2012 Vuelta a Asturias was the 56th edition of the Vuelta a Asturias road cycling stage race, which was held from 27 April to 29 April 2012. The race started in Oviedo and finished at Alto del Naranco. The race was won by Beñat Intxausti of the Movistar Team.

== General classification ==
Final general classification

Rank	Rider	Team	Time
1	Beñat Intxausti (ESP)	Movistar Team	10h 55' 33"
2	David de la Cruz (ESP)	Caja Rural	+ 36"
3	Rémy Di Gregorio (FRA)	Cofidis	+ 42"
4	David López (ESP)	Movistar Team	+ 53"
5	Alejandro Marque (ESP)	Carmim–Prio	+ 1' 08"
6	Amets Txurruka (ESP)	Euskaltel–Euskadi	+ 1' 14"
7	David Blanco (ESP)	Efapel–Glassdrive	+ 1' 39"
8	Pablo Urtasun (ESP)	Euskaltel–Euskadi	+ 1' 41"
9	Giovanny Báez (COL)	EPM–UNE	+ 1' 45"
10	Pello Bilbao (ESP)	Euskaltel–Euskadi	+ 2' 16"
