= 2005 Vuelta a Asturias =

Race details
- Dates: 17–21 June 2005
- Stages: 5
- Distance: 838.5 km (521.0 mi)
- Winning time: 21h 13' 04"

Results
Jersey awarded to the overall winner	Winner	Adolfo García Quesada (ESP)	(Comunidad Valenciana–Elche)
	Second	Samuel Sánchez (ESP)	(Euskaltel–Euskadi)
	Third	Giampaolo Cheula (ITA)	(Barloworld)

The 2005 Vuelta a Asturias was the 49th edition of the Vuelta a Asturias road cycling stage race, which was held from 17 June to 21 June 2005. The race started and finished in Oviedo. The race was won by Adolfo García Quesada of the Comunidad Valenciana–Elche team.

== General classification ==
Final general classification

Rank	Rider	Team	Time
1	Adolfo García Quesada (ESP)	Comunidad Valenciana–Elche	21h 13' 04"
2	Samuel Sánchez (ESP)	Euskaltel–Euskadi	+ 1' 28"
3	Giampaolo Cheula (ITA)	Barloworld	+ 1' 34"
4	José Miguel Galindo (ESP)	Relax–Fuenlabrada	+ 1' 52"
5	Bruno Pires (POR)	Milaneza–Maia	+ 2' 52"
6	Moisés Dueñas (ESP)	Relax–Fuenlabrada	s.t.
7	Luis Pasamontes (ESP)	Relax–Fuenlabrada	+ 3' 09"
8	Giuseppe Di Grande (ITA)	Universal Caffè–Styloffice	+ 3' 53"
9	Ángel Castresana (ESP)	MrBookmaker.com–SportsTech	+ 4' 38"
10	Jorge Ferrío (ESP)	Spiuk	+ 4' 50"
