= 2010 Tour of the Basque Country =

2010 Vuelta al País Vasco
2010 UCI ProTour 2010 UCI World Ranking, race 1 of 26

Race details
- Dates: 5–10 April
- Stages: 6
- Distance: 888 km (551.8 mi)
- Winning time: 23h 27' 30"

Results
Jersey awarded to the overall winner	Winner	Chris Horner (USA)	(Team RadioShack)
	Second	Beñat Intxausti (ESP)	(Euskaltel–Euskadi)
	Third	Joaquim Rodríguez (ESP)	(Team Katusha)
Jersey awarded to the points classification winner	Points	Samuel Sánchez (ESP)	(Euskaltel–Euskadi)
Jersey awarded to the mountains classification winner	Mountains	Gonzalo Rabuñal (ESP)	(Xacobeo–Galicia)
Jersey awarded to the sprints classification winner	Sprints	Christian Meier (CAN)	(Garmin–Transitions)
	Team	Team HTC–Columbia	

The 2010 Tour of the Basque Country, was the 50th edition of the Tour of the Basque Country cycling stage race. It started on 5 April and ended on 10 April. Chris Horner won the race 7 seconds ahead of Alejandro Valverde after winning the sixth and final stage which was an individual time trial 8 seconds ahead of Valverde. Valverde's results were subsequently removed after a retroactive suspension was applied.

== Pre-Race Favourites ==
Two time defending champion, Alberto Contador announced that he would not be taking part in the 2010 Tour. Instead he put his focus at the Critérium International. 2009 Tour de France runner up Andy Schleck and his brother, Fränk Schleck as well as 2009 Vuelta a España champion Alejandro Valverde were heavy favourites. However other favourites also included Team RadioShack's Andreas Klöden, Italy's Damiano Cunego and Samuel Sánchez from Spain.

== Teams ==
There are 20 teams competing in the 2010 Tour of the Basque Country. They are:

- Ag2r–La Mondiale
- Andalucía–Cajasur
- Astana
- Caisse d'Epargne
- Euskaltel–Euskadi
- Footon–Servetto–Fuji
- Française des Jeux
- Garmin–Transitions
- Lampre–Farnese Vini
- Liquigas–Doimo
- Omega Pharma–Lotto
- Quick-Step
- Rabobank
- Team HTC–Columbia
- Team Katusha
- Team Milram
- Team RadioShack
- Team Saxo Bank
- Team Sky
- Xacobeo–Galicia

== Stages ==
=== Stage 1 ===
5 April 2010 – Zierbena to Zierbena, 152 km (94 mi)

Alejandro Valverde was awarded the opening stage after Óscar Freire, who crossed the line first, was disqualified for interfering with him in the sprint. After the subsequent removal of Valverde's results, Freire was reinstated as stage winner. Pre-race favourite, Samuel Sánchez missed a decisive split in the peloton and finished 1:38 behind the peloton, making a victory for him seem very unlikely.

Stage 1 results

	Cyclist	Team	Time
1	Óscar Freire (ESP)	Rabobank	3h 57' 57"
2	~~Alejandro Valverde (ESP)~~	Caisse d'Epargne	+ 0"
3	Christophe Le Mével (FRA)	Française des Jeux	+ 0"
4	Ryder Hesjedal (CAN)	Garmin–Transitions	+ 0"
5	Alexandr Kolobnev (RUS)	Team Katusha	+ 0"
6	Jurgen Van den Broeck (BEL)	Omega Pharma–Lotto	+ 0"
7	Rigoberto Urán (COL)	Caisse d'Epargne	+ 0"
8	Haimar Zubeldia (ESP)	Team RadioShack	+ 0"
9	Dan Martin (IRL)	Garmin–Transitions	+ 0"
10	Benat Intxausti (ESP)	Euskaltel–Euskadi	+ 0"

General classification after Stage 1

	Cyclist	Team	Time
1	Alejandro Valverde (ESP)	Caisse d'Epargne	3h 57' 57"
2	Óscar Freire (ESP)	Rabobank	+ 0"
3	Christophe Le Mével (FRA)	Française des Jeux	+ 0"
4	Ryder Hesjedal (CAN)	Garmin–Transitions	+ 0"
5	Alexandr Kolobnev (RUS)	Team Katusha	+ 0"
6	Jurgen Van den Broeck (BEL)	Omega Pharma–Lotto	+ 0"
7	Rigoberto Urán (COL)	Caisse d'Epargne	+ 0"
8	Haimar Zubeldia (ESP)	Team RadioShack	+ 0"
9	Dan Martin (IRL)	Garmin–Transitions	+ 0"
10	Benat Intxausti (ESP)	Euskaltel–Euskadi	+ 0"

=== Stage 2 ===
6 April 2010 – Zierbena to Viana, 217 km (135 mi)

Stage 2 Results

	Cyclist	Team	Time
1	Óscar Freire (ESP)	Rabobank	5h 53' 40"
2	~~Alejandro Valverde (ESP)~~	Caisse d'Epargne	+ 0"
3	Francesco Gavazzi (ITA)	Lampre–Farnese Vini	+ 1"
4	Michael Albasini (SUI)	Team HTC–Columbia	+ 1"
5	Samuel Sánchez (ESP)	Euskaltel–Euskadi	+ 1"
6	Ryder Hesjedal (CAN)	Garmin–Transitions	+ 1"
7	Kristijan Koren (SLO)	Liquigas–Doimo	+ 1"
8	Alexandr Kolobnev (RUS)	Team Katusha	+ 1"
9	Damiano Cunego (ITA)	Lampre–Farnese Vini	+ 1"
10	Paul Martens (GER)	Rabobank	+ 1"

General classification after Stage 2

	Cyclist	Team	Time
1	Alejandro Valverde (ESP)	Caisse d'Epargne	9h 51' 38"
2	Óscar Freire (ESP)	Rabobank	+ 0"
3	Ryder Hesjedal (CAN)	Garmin–Transitions	+ 1"
4	Alexandr Kolobnev (RUS)	Team Katusha	+ 1"
5	Rigoberto Urán (COL)	Caisse d'Epargne	+ 1"
6	Dan Martin (IRL)	Garmin–Transitions	+ 1"
7	Haimar Zubeldia (ESP)	Team RadioShack	+ 1"
8	Joaquim Rodríguez (ESP)	Team Katusha	+ 1"
9	Damiano Cunego (ITA)	Lampre–Farnese Vini	+ 1"
10	Jurgen Van den Broeck (BEL)	Omega Pharma–Lotto	+ 1"

=== Stage 3 ===
7 April 2010– Viana to Amurrio, 187 km (116 mi)

Stage 3 Results

	Cyclist	Team	Time
1	Francesco Gavazzi (ITA)	Lampre–Farnese Vini	4h 49' 52"
2	Óscar Freire (ESP)	Rabobank	+ 0"
3	Peter Velits (SVK)	Team HTC–Columbia	+ 0"
4	Alexander Bocharov (RUS)	Team Katusha	+ 0"
5	Samuel Sánchez (ESP)	Euskaltel–Euskadi	+ 0"
6	Davide Viganò (ITA)	Team Sky	+ 0"
7	Christian Knees (GER)	Team Milram	+ 0"
8	Davide Malacarne (ITA)	Quick-Step	+ 0"
9	Paul Martens (GER)	Rabobank	+ 0"
10	Kristijan Koren (SLO)	Liquigas–Doimo	+ 0"

General classification after Stage 3

	Cyclist	Team	Time
1	Óscar Freire (ESP)	Rabobank	14h 41' 30"
2	Alejandro Valverde (ESP)	Caisse d'Epargne	+ 2"
3	Ryder Hesjedal (CAN)	Garmin–Transitions	+ 3"
4	Alexandr Kolobnev (RUS)	Team Katusha	+ 3"
5	Haimar Zubeldia (ESP)	Team RadioShack	+ 3"
6	Marco Pinotti (ITA)	Team HTC–Columbia	+ 3"
7	Joaquim Rodríguez (ESP)	Team Katusha	+ 3"
8	Damiano Cunego (ITA)	Lampre–Farnese Vini	+ 3"
9	Dries Devenyns (BEL)	Quick-Step	+ 3"
10	Jurgen Van den Broeck (BEL)	Omega Pharma–Lotto	+ 3"

=== Stage 4 ===
8 April 2010 – Murgia to Eibar, 160 km (99 mi)

After missing a decisive split that put him over 1:30 behind the race leader, it was the Olympic Champion Samuel Sánchez who won the hilliest stage of this year's tour.

Samuel Sánchez caught Chris Horner at the top of the Alto de Usartza climb and then dived down the short descent to the finish to win by two seconds. Alejandro Valverde and Robert Gesink also caught Chris Horner who barely managed to stay with them.

The victory put Alejandro Valverde only one second ahead of Chris Horner and Robert Gesink respectively. The overall favourites knew they had to wait for the Alto de Usartza, that ended just two kilometres from the finish.

Samuel Sánchez's victory was Euskaltel–Euskadi's first victory of the 2010 cycling year as well.

Stage 4 Results

	Cyclist	Team	Time
1	Samuel Sánchez (ESP)	Euskaltel–Euskadi	4h 05' 16"
2	~~Alejandro Valverde (ESP)~~	Caisse d'Epargne	+ 2"
3	Robert Gesink (NED)	Rabobank	+ 2"
4	Chris Horner (USA)	Team RadioShack	+ 2"
5	Beñat Intxausti (ESP)	Euskaltel–Euskadi	+ 33"
6	Jean-Christophe Péraud (FRA)	Omega Pharma–Lotto	+ 33"
7	Damiano Cunego (ITA)	Lampre–Farnese Vini	+ 40"
8	Andy Schleck (LUX)	Team Saxo Bank	+ 40"
9	Sandy Casar (FRA)	Française des Jeux	+ 49"
10	Joaquim Rodríguez (ESP)	Team Katusha	+ 49"

General classification after Stage 4

	Cyclist	Team	Time
1	Alejandro Valverde (ESP)	Caisse d'Epargne	18h 46' 50"
2	Chris Horner (USA)	Team RadioShack	+ 1"
3	Robert Gesink (NED)	Rabobank	+ 1"
4	Jean-Christophe Péraud (FRA)	Omega Pharma–Lotto	+ 32"
5	Beñat Intxausti (ESP)	Euskaltel–Euskadi	+ 32"
6	Damiano Cunego (ITA)	Lampre–Farnese Vini	+ 39"
7	Andy Schleck (LUX)	Team Saxo Bank	+ 39"
8	Marco Pinotti (ITA)	Team HTC–Columbia	+ 48"
9	Joaquim Rodríguez (ESP)	Team Katusha	+ 48"
10	Sandy Casar (FRA)	Française des Jeux	+ 48"

=== Stage 5 ===
9 April 2010 – Eibar to Orio, 170 km (110 mi)

Joaquim Rodríguez soloed across the finish line, taking 14 seconds off of race leader Alejandro Valverde and put him comfortably in 3rd place. 2008 Champion Samuel Sánchez came in 2nd place, just ahead of race leader Alejandro Valverde.

A large attack group including mountains classification leader Amets Txurruka spent much of the day ahead of the peloton. On the penultimate climb Txurruka attacked solo, but crashed on the descent towards the final climb. He was able to complete the stage, but broke his collarbone in the incident and had to drop out before the final time trial.

Robert Gesink who was in 3rd place after the previous stage, is now in 8th place after experiencing a crash on the final climb. His team (Rabobank) reported that he may have broken a bone in his hand.

Joaquim Rodríguez had attacked out of the chasing peloton with about 20 km to go, passing the remnants of an earlier escape group. He had come into the stage 48 seconds down on the general ranking, dangerous enough for Valverde, Horner and Sánchez to give chase.

Joaquim Rodríguez was happy with the result and the ITT is different than normal because it has a hilly finish. His dream is to take the GC.

Stage 5 Results

	Cyclist	Team	Time
1	Joaquim Rodríguez (ESP)	Team Katusha	4h 07' 52"
2	Samuel Sánchez (ESP)	Euskaltel–Euskadi	+ 14"
3	~~Alejandro Valverde (ESP)~~	Caisse d'Epargne	+ 14"
4	Chris Horner (USA)	Team RadioShack	+ 14"
5	Sandy Casar (FRA)	Française des Jeux	+ 20"
6	Francesco Gavazzi (ITA)	Lampre–Farnese Vini	+ 20"
7	Ryder Hesjedal (CAN)	Garmin–Transitions	+ 20"
8	Dries Devenyns (BEL)	Quick-Step	+ 20"
9	Jurgen Van den Broeck (BEL)	Omega Pharma–Lotto	+ 20"
10	Jean-Christophe Péraud (FRA)	Omega Pharma–Lotto	+ 20"

General classification after Stage 5

	Cyclist	Team	Time
1	Alejandro Valverde (ESP)	Caisse d'Epargne	22h 54' 56"
2	Chris Horner (USA)	Team RadioShack	+ 1"
3	Joaquim Rodríguez (ESP)	Team Katusha	+ 34"
4	Jean-Christophe Péraud (FRA)	Omega Pharma–Lotto	+ 38"
5	Beñat Intxausti (ESP)	Euskaltel–Euskadi	+ 38"
6	Andy Schleck (LUX)	Team Saxo Bank	+ 45"
7	Marco Pinotti (ITA)	Team HTC–Columbia	+ 54"
8	Robert Gesink (NED)	Rabobank	+ 54"
9	Sandy Casar (FRA)	Française des Jeux	+ 54"
10	Dries Devenyns (BEL)	Quick-Step	+ 1' 16"

=== Stage 6 ===
10 April 2010 – Orio to Orio, 22 km (14 mi) (Individual Time Trial)

Stage 6 Results

	Cyclist	Team	Time
1	Chris Horner (USA)	Team RadioShack	32' 33"
2	~~Alejandro Valverde (ESP)~~	Caisse d'Epargne	+ 8"
3	Maxime Monfort (BEL)	Team HTC–Columbia	+ 13"
4	Michael Rogers (AUS)	Team HTC–Columbia	+ 18"
5	Beñat Intxausti (ESP)	Euskaltel–Euskadi	+ 21"
6	Samuel Sánchez (ESP)	Euskaltel–Euskadi	+ 23"
7	Marco Pinotti (ITA)	Team HTC–Columbia	+ 25"
8	Joaquim Rodríguez (ESP)	Team Katusha	+ 33"
9	Jean-Christophe Péraud (FRA)	Omega Pharma–Lotto	+ 33"
10	Andreas Klöden (GER)	Team RadioShack	+ 34""

General classification after Stage 6

	Cyclist	Team	Time
1	Chris Horner (USA)	Team RadioShack	23h 27' 30"
2	Alejandro Valverde (ESP)	Caisse d'Epargne	+ 7"
3	Beñat Intxausti (ESP)	Euskaltel–Euskadi	+ 58"
4	Joaquim Rodríguez (ESP)	Team Katusha	+ 1' 06"
5	Jean-Christophe Péraud (FRA)	Omega Pharma–Lotto	+ 1' 10"
6	Marco Pinotti (ITA)	Team HTC–Columbia	+ 1' 18"
7	Sandy Casar (FRA)	Française des Jeux	+ 1' 47"
8	Samuel Sánchez (ESP)	Euskaltel–Euskadi	+ 1' 58"
9	Robert Gesink (NED)	Rabobank	+ 1' 59"
10	Dries Devenyns (BEL)	Quick-Step	+ 2' 27"

== Classification Leadership ==
Stage	Winner	General classification	Points Classification	Mountains Classification	Sprints Classification	Team Classification
1	~~Alejandro Valverde~~; Óscar Freire	~~Alejandro Valverde~~; Óscar Freire	~~Alejandro Valverde~~; Óscar Freire	Gonzalo Rabuñal	Christian Meier	Team RadioShack
2	~~Alejandro Valverde~~; Óscar Freire	~~Alejandro Valverde~~; Óscar Freire	~~Alejandro Valverde~~; Óscar Freire	Gonzalo Rabuñal	Christian Meier	Team RadioShack
3	Francesco Gavazzi	Óscar Freire	Óscar Freire	Gonzalo Rabuñal	Christian Meier	Team RadioShack
4	Samuel Sánchez	~~Alejandro Valverde~~; Chris Horner	~~Alejandro Valverde~~; Samuel Sánchez	Amets Txurruka	Christian Meier	Team RadioShack
5	Joaquim Rodríguez	~~Alejandro Valverde~~; Chris Horner	~~Alejandro Valverde~~; Samuel Sánchez	Amets Txurruka	Christian Meier	Team RadioShack
6	Chris Horner	Chris Horner	~~Alejandro Valverde~~; Samuel Sánchez	Gonzalo Rabuñal	Christian Meier	Team HTC–Columbia
Final		Chris Horner	~~Alejandro Valverde~~; Samuel Sánchez	Gonzalo Rabuñal	Christian Meier	Team HTC–Columbia

== Final results ==
=== General classification ===
	Rider	Team	Time
1	Chris Horner (USA)	Team RadioShack	23h 27' 30"
2	Beñat Intxausti (ESP)	Euskaltel–Euskadi	+ 58"
3	Joaquim Rodríguez (ESP)	Team Katusha	+ 1' 06"
4	Jean-Christophe Péraud (FRA)	Omega Pharma–Lotto	+ 1' 10"
5	Marco Pinotti (ITA)	Team HTC–Columbia	+ 1' 18"
6	Sandy Casar (FRA)	Française des Jeux	+ 1' 47"
7	Samuel Sánchez (ESP)	Euskaltel–Euskadi	+ 1' 58"
8	Robert Gesink (NED)	Rabobank	+ 1' 59"
9	Dries Devenyns (BEL)	Quick-Step	+ 2' 27"
10	Jurgen Van den Broeck (BEL)	Omega Pharma–Lotto	+ 2' 37"

=== Points Classification ===
	Rider	Team	Points
1	Samuel Sánchez (ESP)	Euskaltel–Euskadi	79
3	Óscar Freire (ESP)	Rabobank	60
4	Chris Horner (USA)	Team RadioShack	53
5	Francesco Gavazzi (ITA)	Lampre–Farnese Vini	51
6	Joaquim Rodríguez (ESP)	Team Katusha	46
7	Beñat Intxausti (ESP)	Euskaltel–Euskadi	34
8	Ryder Hesjedal (CAN)	Garmin–Transitions	33
9	Sandy Casar (FRA)	Française des Jeux	26
10	Jean-Christophe Péraud (FRA)	Omega Pharma–Lotto	24

=== Mountains Classification ===
	Rider	Team	Points
1	Gonzalo Rabuñal (ESP)	Xacobeo–Galicia	23
2	José Alberto Benítez (ESP)	Footon–Servetto–Fuji	19
3	Michael Albasini (SUI)	Team HTC–Columbia	16
4	Jakob Fuglsang (DEN)	Team Saxo Bank	16
5	Johannes Fröhlinger (GER)	Team Milram	14
6	Chris Horner (USA)	Team RadioShack	13
7	Michael Rogers (AUS)	Team HTC–Columbia	12
8	Ivan Santaromita (ITA)	Liquigas–Doimo	11
9	Robert Gesink (NED)	Rabobank	9
10	Joaquim Rodríguez (ESP)	Team Katusha	8

=== Sprints Classification ===
	Rider	Team	Points
1	Christian Meier (CAN)	Garmin–Transitions	14
2	Jakob Fuglsang (DEN)	Team Saxo Bank	9
3	Egoi Martínez (ESP)	Euskaltel–Euskadi	9
4	Michael Albasini (SUI)	Team HTC–Columbia	9
5	Serguei Klimov (RUS)	Team Katusha	8
6	Iban Mayoz (ESP)	Euskaltel–Euskadi	4
7	Michael Rogers (AUS)	Team HTC–Columbia	4
8	Dmitriy Fofonov (KAZ)	Astana	3
9	Rémy Di Gregorio (FRA)	Française des Jeux	3
10	Ryder Hesjedal (CAN)	Garmin–Transitions	2

=== Team classification ===
Pos.	Team	Time
1	Team HTC–Columbia	70h 28′ 40″
2	Team RadioShack	+ 17″
3	Euskaltel–Euskadi	+ 2′ 14″
4	Caisse d'Epargne	+ 6′ 09″
5	Team Katusha	+ 14′ 32″
6	Française des Jeux	+ 18′ 08″
7	Rabobank	+ 20′ 44″
8	Omega Pharma–Lotto	+ 21′ 43″
9	Quick-Step	+ 23′ 29″
10	Team Saxo Bank	+ 24′ 17″

== See also ==
- 2010 in road cycling
- UCI Pro Tour
