= Chris Horner =

American road bicycle racer

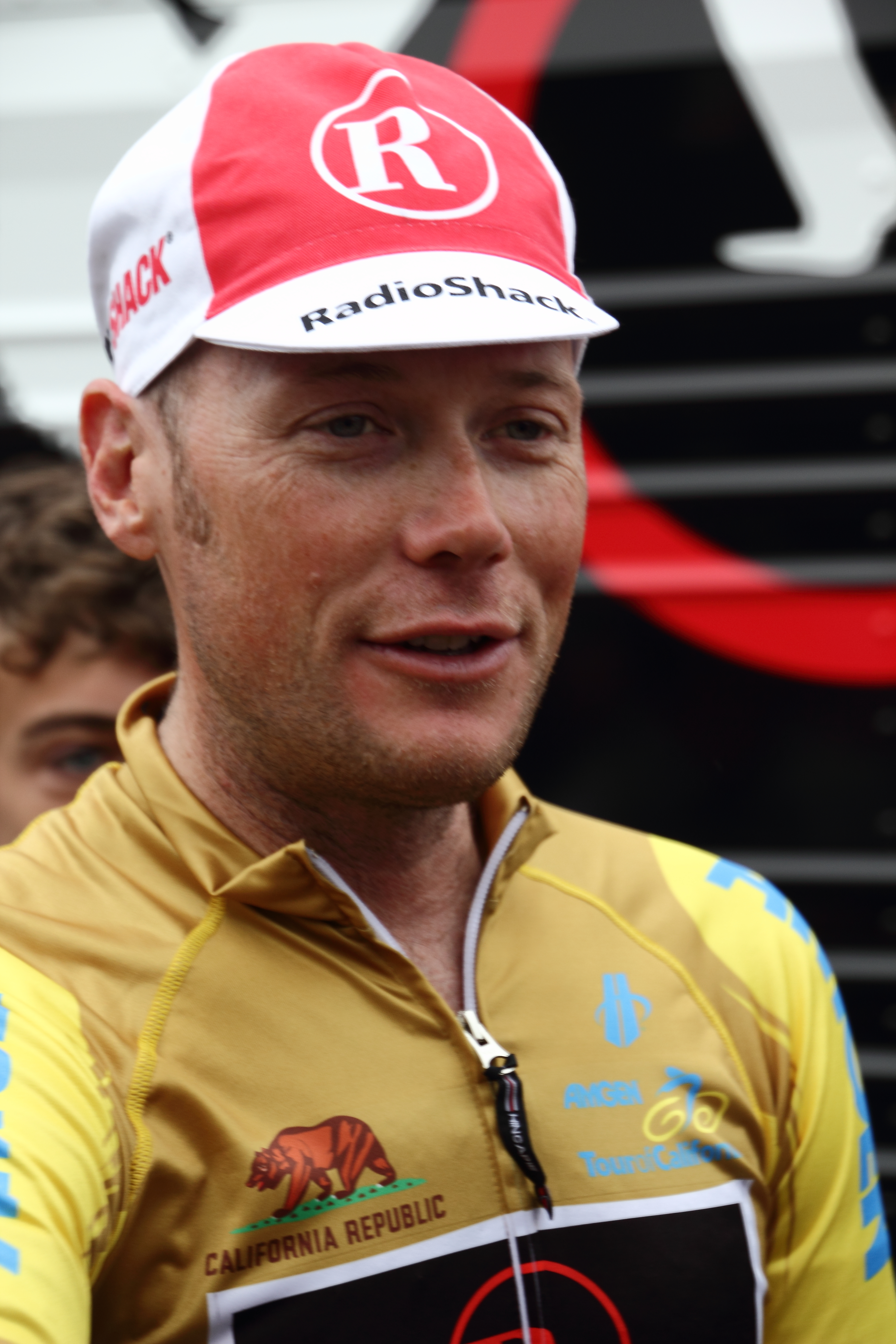
- Horner at the 2011 Tour of California

Personal information
- Full name: Christopher Brandon Horner
- Nicknames: The Hornet, The Second Best Climber in the World
- Born: October 23, 1971 (age 55) Okinawa, Japan
- Height: 1.80 m (5 ft 11 in)
- Weight: 70 kg (154 lb; 11 st 0 lb)

Cycling career
- Sport: Cycling
- Current team: Retired
- Discipline: Road
- Role: Rider
- Rider type: All-rounder

Amateur teams
- 1993: Lite Beer
- 1994–1996: Nutra Fig

Professional teams
- 1997–1999: Française des Jeux
- 2000–2001: Mercury
- 2002: Prime Alliance
- 2003: Saturn
- 2004: Webcor Builders
- 2005: Saunier Duval–Prodir
- 2006–2007: Davitamon–Lotto
- 2008–2009: Astana
- 2010–2011: Team RadioShack
- 2012–2013: RadioShack–Nissan
- 2014: Lampre–Merida
- 2015: Airgas–Safeway
- 2016: Lupus Racing Team
- 2018–2019: Team Illuminate

Major wins
- Grand Tours Vuelta a España General classification (2013) Combination classification (2013) 2 individual stages (2013) Stage races Tour de Langkawi (2000) Tour de Georgia (2003) Tour of the Basque Country (2010) Tour of California (2011)

Christopher Brandon Horner (born October 23, 1971) is an American retired professional road racing cyclist, who rode professionally between 1996 and 2019. A current resident of Bend, Oregon, Horner dominated the American road racing scene by winning the points standings in the 2002, 2003 and 2004 USA Cycling National Racing Calendar. He won the Vuelta a España in 2013, becoming the oldest winner of any of cycling's grand tours in the process.

== Racing career ==
=== Early years (1995–99) ===
Horner turned professional in 1995 with the PAA–NutraFig team. He captured his first major victory in a stage win of the Tour DuPont in 1996. He then rode in Europe with French team Française des Jeux. From 1997 to 1999 he had three frustrating seasons with this team.

In 2000, Horner returned to the United States to resume a record-setting domestic career, riding with Mercury in 2000, Prime Alliance in 2002, Saturn in 2003 and Webcor Builders in 2004. Horner won almost every important race in the US racing calendar, with the notable exception of the USPRO National Championships.

=== Saunier Duval (2004–05) ===
Horner moved to Saunier Duval–Prodir after his top-ten finish in the 2004 UCI Road World Championships because he wanted to give the Tour de France a try. After being injured in the beginning of 2005, Horner showed strong performance in the USPRO Championships and won his first major European victory by taking the sixth stage of the 2005 Tour de Suisse. He then earned his place on the 2005 Tour de France team and nearly won the Miramas to Montpellier stage when he and Sylvain Chavanel refused to cooperate in the final kilometers and were caught by the peloton.

=== Davitamon and Predictor (2006–07) ===
Horner moved to the Belgian UCI ProTour squad Davitamon–Lotto for the 2006 season. He took a stage victory at the Tour de Romandie, and finished the race in seventh overall. During both the 2006 Tour de France and the 2007 Tour de France, Horner was one of the most important domestiques for general classification contender Cadel Evans, who placed inside the top-five overall in both years.

For 2007, Horner signed with Ed Krall Racing for the cyclo-cross season.

=== Astana (2008–09) ===
In 2008, Horner moved to Astana. Horner earned the nickname "The Smiler" for his unflappable expression of happiness, even during the most excruciating physical challenges, and "The Yahoo Kid" for his wild exclamations after winning a race. Teammates Levi Leipheimer and Lance Armstrong call him "The Redneck".

In the 2008 Cascade Cycling Classic Horner carried amateur cyclist and Nordic combined skier Bill Demong (who was from another team) with his broken bicycle to the finish line.

=== RadioShack (2010–11) ===
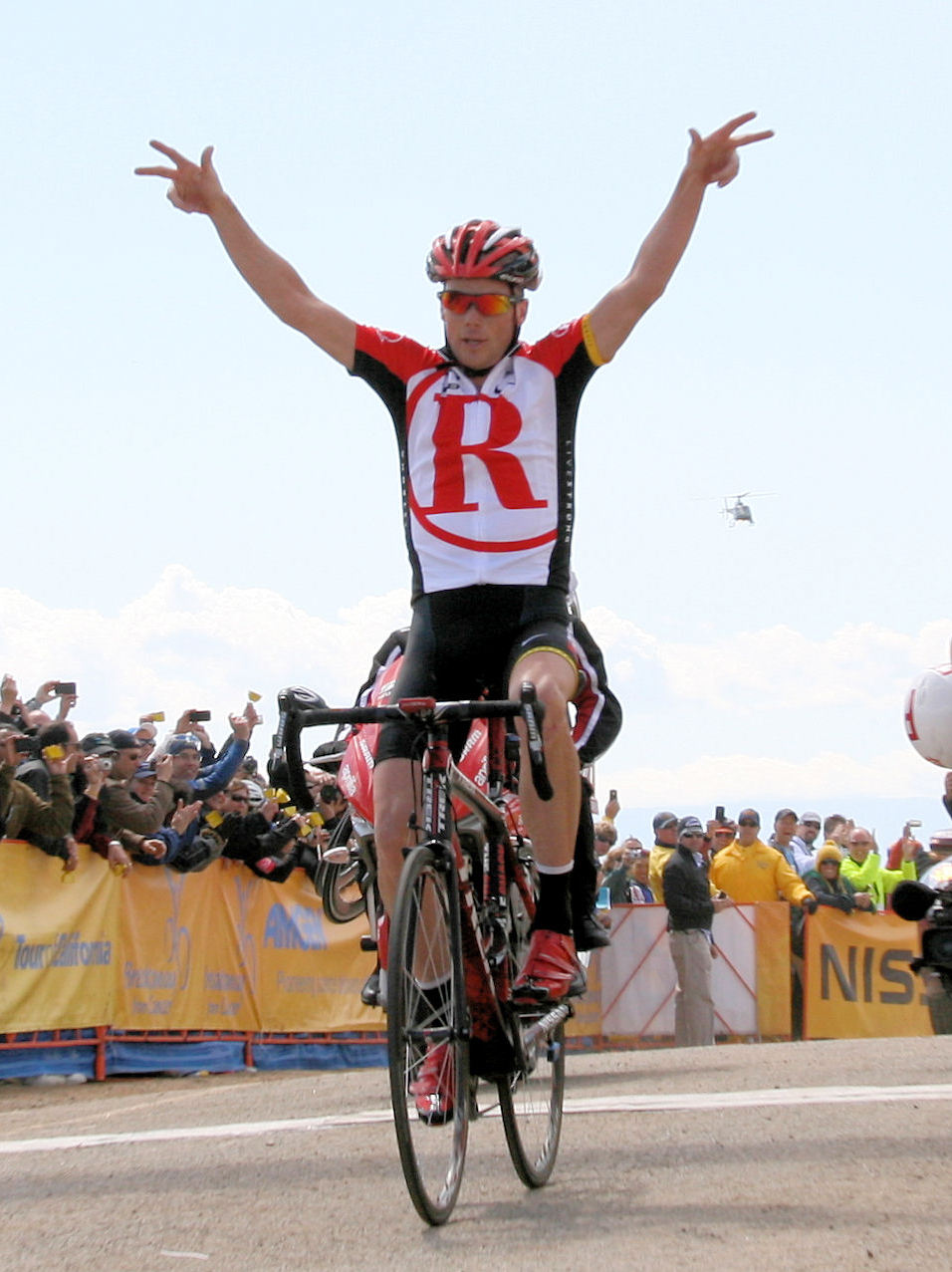
Horner won the fourth stage of the 2011 Tour of California, before taking overall victory.

==== 2010 ====
On October 4, 2009, it was confirmed that Horner would compete for Team RadioShack in the next two seasons. In one of his strongest European campaigns, Horner garnered first overall at the Tour of the Basque Country, including a stage win in the critical 6th stage individual time trial, defeating overall threat Alejandro Valverde. Horner also achieved several top 10 placings in the Spring classics of La Flèche Wallonne, Liège–Bastogne–Liège and the Amstel Gold Race. He and his RadioShack teammates did well at the Tour of California, with Horner putting on a particularly strong performance in the last stage of the race as a member of a final breakaway at Thousand Oaks. Horner finished fourth overall, 64 seconds behind winner Michael Rogers, and just 39 seconds behind teammate Levi Leipheimer in overall time. His good form also resulted in a 9th place overall at the Tour de France, as the first-placed American rider, in spite of dedicating himself in the first stages to supporting his captain Lance Armstrong.

==== 2011 ====
In 2011, Horner continued his success at the Tour of the Basque Country with a second-place finish, as well as 4th at the Volta a Catalunya. Horner then accomplished another high-profile result by winning May's Tour of California stage race. He scored a major solo victory on the 4th stage, after making significant time gains on the day's final mountain finish in San Jose. He maintained his hold on the yellow jersey until the tour's queen stage, where he completed a two-man breakaway finish with teammate Levi Leipheimer to finalize the overall lead, and at age 39 became the oldest rider in history to win that tour. His participation at the Tour de France was short lived after a crash left him out of the competition.

=== RadioShack–Nissan (2012–2013) ===
==== 2012 ====
In 2012, Horner signed with RadioShack–Nissan. He started the Tirreno–Adriatico as his first race since July where he finished second after losing his lead in the final time trial to Vincenzo Nibali. He then finished 8th in the Tour of California, failing to defend his title. He then rode the Tour de France where he ended up finishing 13th overall after putting a good performance in the mountains.

==== 2013 ====
I've been a professional for almost 20 years so this represents a lifetime of hard work. A Grand Tour is always a goal for a cyclist to show how good a rider you are. The memories will last forever and the riders I came with were amazing and my team has been fantastic.

— Chris Horner, after winning the 2013 Vuelta a España, The Daily Telegraph

After suffering an injury in the beginning of 2013, Horner returned to action after winning stage 5 in the Tour of Utah and finishing 2nd overall. Less than three weeks later, in stage 3 of the Vuelta a España, Horner attacked over the last kilometer to win the stage and take the overall lead in the race. By doing this, he became the oldest rider in history (41 years and 307 days) to win a stage and wear the leader's jersey in a Grand Tour. He won again on stage 10, another uphill finish, reclaiming the lead. and setting a new record of the oldest rider (41 years and 314 days) to win a stage in a Grand Tour. He lost the race lead on the following stage to Vincenzo Nibali, and fell to fourth overall; however, he moved up to second place overall – 50 seconds behind Nibali – before the race's final week. He reduced Nibali's lead by 22 seconds on stage 16, and 25 seconds on stage 18, to trail by 3 seconds. A six-second swing on stage 19 resulted in Horner taking a three-second lead into the penultimate stage, which ends with the climb up the Alto de l'Angliru, one of the hardest climbs in all of cycling that has been both vilified as an act of "barbarism". and praised as a great challenge.

Nibali – who had been looking to complete a Giro–Vuelta double – tried to distance Horner on several occasions as they climbed into the clouds on the mountains on the Angliru with fans parting as they rode up sections so steep that the camera bikes stalled and fell leaving no TV coverage for several minutes as they struggled to catch up. But Horner answered every attack by slowly reeling Nibali in before Nibali finally cracked on a hairpin turn on a 20% + section with just 1k remaining. However Horner continued opening the gap out to 28 seconds on the road by the finish line. But the second place time bonus gave him his race-winning margin of 37 seconds and Chris Horner won the Vuelta a España. It was Horner's only grand tour win in his 20+ year professional career, and in winning this race he became the oldest ever Grand Tour winner.

He left RadioShack–Leopard at the end of the season, as his contract expired. He felt he was worth more than the team were willing to offer for a rider of his resume and ability.

=== Lampre–Merida (2014) ===
Horner joined Lampre–Merida for the 2014 season. In April, while training in Italy for the Giro d'Italia, he was hit by a car driver who subsequently fled the scene. Horner suffered a punctured lung and broken ribs in the accident, jeopardizing his participation at the Giro d'Italia. He elected not to compete in the Giro d'Italia; on June 30, 2014, Horner was named in Lampre's Tour de France squad, with Rui Costa as team leader.

He placed second in the mountainous Tour of Utah which he raced in preparation for the Vuelta a España. However, Horner withdrew from the Vuelta ahead of the first stage due to his cortisol levels dropping below the threshold considered healthy by the Mouvement pour un cyclisme crédible, of which Lampre–Mérida is a member. The announcement followed Horner's usage of cortisone on prescription under a therapeutic use exemption to treat a case of bronchitis.

Lampre–Mérida opted not to extend Horner's contract, and in December 2014 he announced he had signed a deal with UCI Continental team Airgas–Safeway for 2015.

=== Team Illuminate (2018–2019) ===
In June 2018, Horner returned to racing for the United States National Road Race Championships, riding for Team Illuminate. He said that overcoming a bronchial infection that had plagued the tailend of his career had convinced him to come out of retirement. However, he eventually did not finish the road race.

== Broadcasting career ==
In 2019, Horner joined the team of broadcaster NBC for their coverage of the Tour de France, acting as a commentator, and in August 2020 started his own YouTube show called 'The Butterfly Effect'.

== Major results ==
1996
1st Lancaster Classic
1st Stage 1 Tour DuPont
2nd Overall Redlands Bicycle Classic
3rd Road race, National Road Championships
3rd Overall Fitchburg Longsjo Classic
1997
3rd GP Ouest–France
3rd Nevada City Classic
1998
7th Overall Tour du Poitou-Charentes et de la Vienne
9th Grand Prix des Nations
1999
9th Overall Circuit des Mines
2000
1st Overall Tour de Langkawi
1st Overall Redlands Bicycle Classic
8th Overall Critérium International
8th Route Adélie de Vitré
2001
2nd Overall Cascade Cycling Classic

1st Stage 3

5th Overall Redlands Bicycle Classic

1st Stage 5

2002
1st USA Cycling National Racing Calendar
1st Overall Redlands Bicycle Classic

1st Stages 1 & 2

1st Overall Sea Otter Classic

1st Stage 3

1st Overall Nature Valley Grand Prix

1st Stage 3

1st Overall Fitchburg Longsjo Classic
2nd Time trial, National Road Championships
3rd Overall Cascade Cycling Classic
9th San Francisco Grand Prix
2003
1st USA Cycling National Racing Calendar
1st Overall Tour de Georgia

1st Mountains classification

1st Overall Redlands Bicycle Classic
1st San Francisco Grand Prix
1st Stage 4 Cascade Cycling Classic
2nd Overall Fitchburg Longsjo Classic

1st Stages 2 & 3

3rd Overall Sea Otter Classic
9th Lancaster Classic
2004
1st USA Cycling National Racing Calendar
1st Overall Sea Otter Classic

1st Stage 2

1st Overall Redlands Bicycle Classic

1st Stages 1a (ITT), 1b & 2

1st Overall International Tour de Toona
3rd Overall Tour de Georgia
8th Road race, UCI Road World Championships
2005
3rd Road race, National Road Championships
5th Overall Tour de Suisse

1st Stage 6

6th Lancaster Classic
2006
7th Overall Tour de Romandie

1st Stage 2

8th Liège–Bastogne–Liège
10th Overall Paris–Nice
2007
3rd Giro dell'Emilia
5th Overall Tour de Romandie
5th Coppa Sabatini
10th Giro di Lombardia
2008
7th Overall Tour of California
7th Giro di Lombardia
2009
2nd Overall Tour de l'Ain

1st Points classification

2010
1st Overall Tour of the Basque Country

1st Stage 6 (ITT)

2nd Overall Giro di Sardegna
4th Road race, National Road Championships
4th Overall Tour of California
7th Overall Critérium International
7th La Flèche Wallonne
7th Liège–Bastogne–Liège
8th Overall Tour de France
9th Overall Critérium du Dauphiné
10th Amstel Gold Race
2011
1st Overall Tour of California

1st Stage 4

2nd Overall Tour of the Basque Country
3rd Overall Volta a Catalunya
2012
2nd Overall Tirreno–Adriatico
7th Overall Tour of Utah
8th Overall Tour of California
9th Overall Tour of the Basque Country
2013
1st Overall Vuelta a España

1st Combination classification
1st Stages 3 & 10

2nd Overall Tour of Utah

1st Stage 5

6th Overall Tirreno–Adriatico
2014
2nd Overall Tour of Utah
8th Overall Volta ao Algarve
2015
4th Overall Tour d'Azerbaïdjan
5th Road race, National Road Championships
5th Overall Tour of Utah
7th Overall Redlands Bicycle Classic
9th Overall Tour of the Gila
2016
9th Overall Tour of the Gila

=== General classification results timeline ===
Grand Tour general classification results timeline
Grand Tour	1998	1999	2000	2001	2002	2003	2004	2005	2006	2007	2008	2009	2010	2011	2012	2013	2014
Giro d'Italia	—	—	—	—	—	—	—	—	—	—	—	DNF	—	—	—	—	—
Tour de France	—	—	—	—	—	—	—	33	61	14	—	—	8	DNF	13	—	17
/ Vuelta a España	—	—	—	—	—	—	—	—	20	36	—	DNF	—	—	—	1	—
Major stage race general classification results timeline
Race	1998	1999	2000	2001	2002	2003	2004	2005	2006	2007	2008	2009	2010	2011	2012	2013	2014
/ Paris–Nice	—	65	—	—	—	—	—	—	10	24	—	—	49	—	—	—	—
/ Tirreno–Adriatico	—	—	—	—	—	—	—	DNF	—	—	—	—	—	—	2	6	DNF
Volta a Catalunya	—	—	—	—	—	—	—	—	—	—	58	—	—	3	—	DNF	DNF
Tour of the Basque Country	—	—	—	DNF	—	—	—	—	31	DNF	41	DNF	1	2	9	—	—
/ Tour de Romandie	43	—	—	93	—	—	—	—	7	5	—	—	—	—	—	—	—
Critérium du Dauphiné	—	—	—	—	—	—	—	—	34	—	DNF	—	9	—	—	—	—
Tour de Suisse	—	DNF	DNF	—	—	—	—	5	—	42	—	—	—	—	—	—	—

Legend
—	Did not compete
DNF	Did not finish
