= Forcella =

Forcella (Italian for 'fork; bifurcated thing') may refer to:

== Fruit ==
- Fortana, a red Italian wine grape variety
- Albana della Forcella, a white Italian wine grape variety

== Places ==
- Forcella, neighbourhood in Naples, Italy, see Quarters of Naples § Other toponyms
  - Sant'Agrippino a Forcella, a Roman Catholic church in Naples, Italy
  - Santa Maria Egiziaca a Forcella, a Roman Catholic church in Naples, Italy
- Forcella Staulanza, a mountain pass in the Dolomites, Italy
- Birnlücke, known in Italian as Forcella del Picco, a mountain pass in the Hohe Tauern, Austria
- Palazzo Forcella de Seta, a palace in Palermo, Italy

== People ==
- Enrico Forcella (1907–1989), Venezuelan shooter
- Enzo Forcella (1921–1999), Italian essayist, historian and journalist
