= José Herrada =

Spanish road racing cyclist

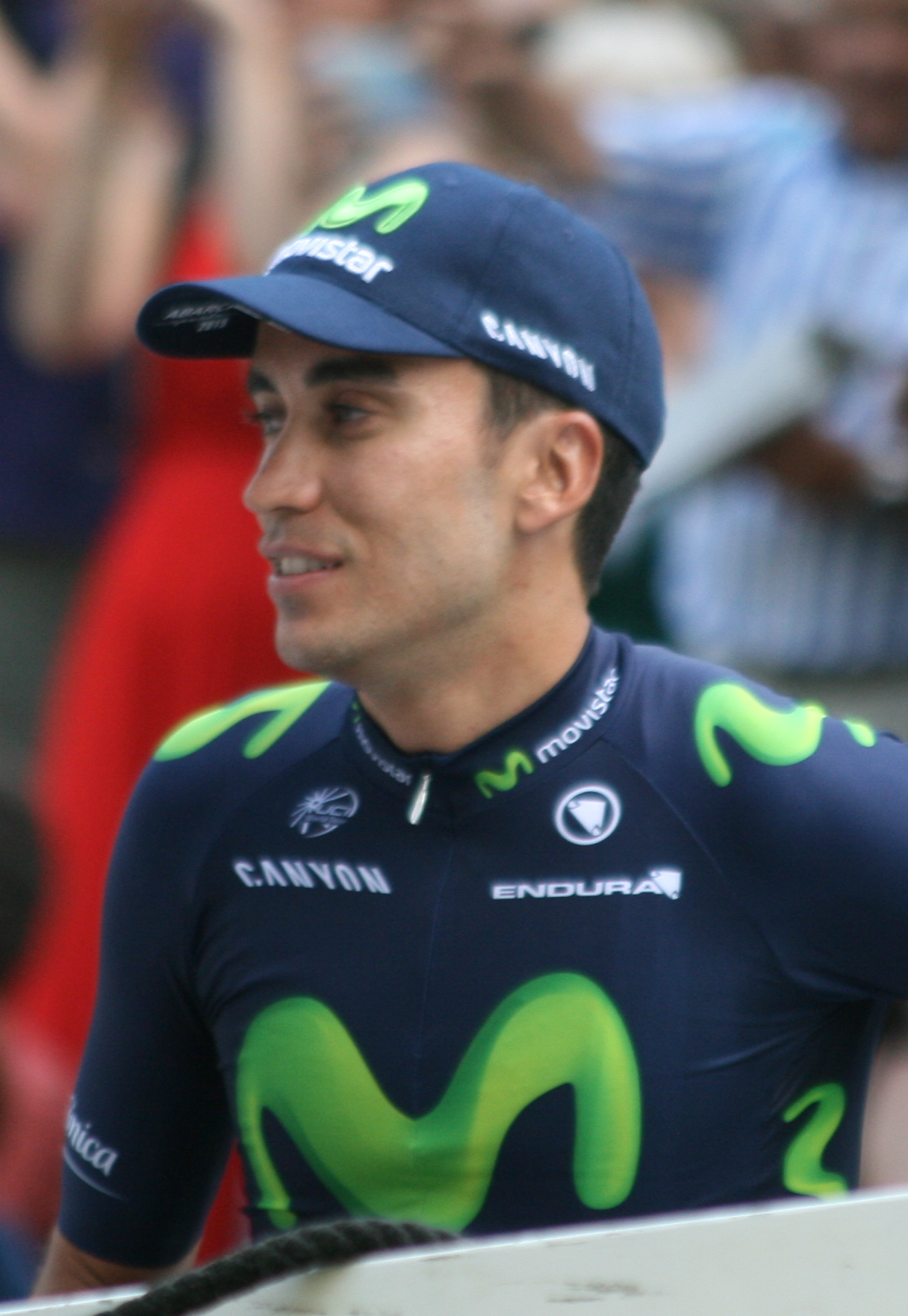
- Herrada at the 2015 Tour de France

Personal information
- Full name: José Herrada López
- Born: 1 October 1985 (age 41) Mota del Cuervo, Spain
- Height: 1.75 m (5 ft 9 in)
- Weight: 65 kg (143 lb; 10.2 st)

Cycling career
- Sport: Cycling
- Current team: Retired
- Discipline: Road
- Role: Rider
- Rider type: Climber

Amateur team
- 2004–2005: Enypesa–El Mundo

Professional teams
- 2006–2007: Viña Magna–Cropu
- 2008–2009: Contentpolis–Murcia
- 2010–2011: Caja Rural
- 2012–2017: Movistar Team
- 2018–2023: Cofidis

José Herrada Lopez (born 1 October 1985) is a Spanish former professional road bicycle racer, who competed as a professional from 2006 to 2023. His brother Jesús Herrada is also a professional cyclist, and also competes for Cofidis.

== Career ==
Born in Mota del Cuervo, Herrada has been competing as a professional since the 2006 season, competing for the Viña Magna–Cropu, Contentpolis–Murcia and Caja Rural teams prior to joining the Movistar Team for the 2012 season. Herrada made his Grand Tour début at the 2012 Giro d'Italia; during the sixteenth stage, Herrada was part of the stage-long breakaway, and ended up finishing the stage in fifth place.

He was named in the start list for the 2015 Tour de France, which was his only appearance at the race. During the 2023 Vuelta a España, it was announced that Herrada would retire from professional cycling at the conclusion of the season.

== Major results ==
2005
9th Overall Ruban Granitier Breton
2006
10th Overall Vuelta a León
2007
1st Stage 6 Tour de l'Avenir
2nd Overall Tour des Pyrénées

1st Points classification
1st Mountains classification
1st Young rider classification

2009
3rd Klasika Primavera
6th Overall Vuelta a Asturias
2010
1st Overall Cinturó de l'Empordà

1st Stage 2

1st Stage 5 Volta a Portugal
3rd Overall Tour de Normandie
4th Overall Circuito Montañés
6th Overall Vuelta a Asturias
7th Overall Vuelta a la Comunidad de Madrid
8th Prueba Villafranca de Ordizia
10th Subida al Naranco
10th Klasika Primavera
2011
4th Overall Route du Sud
6th Overall Vuelta a Asturias
7th Gran Premio de Llodio
9th Prueba Villafranca de Ordizia
10th Overall Vuelta a Murcia
2013
5th Klasika Primavera
2014
1st Stage 1 (TTT) Vuelta a España
3rd Prueba Villafranca de Ordizia
2015
1st Klasika Primavera
2016
3rd Circuito de Getxo
2017
3rd Circuito de Getxo
4th Prueba Villafranca de Ordizia
2019
8th Overall Vuelta a Murcia
Combativity award Stage 5 Vuelta a España

=== Grand Tour general classification results timeline ===
Grand Tour	2012	2013	2014	2015	2016	2017	2018	2019	2020	2021	2022	2023
Giro d'Italia	44	25	23	—	62	61	—	—	—	—	—	—
Tour de France	—	—	—	65	—	—	—	—	—	—	—	—
Vuelta a España	—	12	32	—	91	—	57	75	26	57	DNF	132

Legend
—	Did not compete
DNF	Did not finish
