= Michele Scarponi =

Italian road racing cyclist

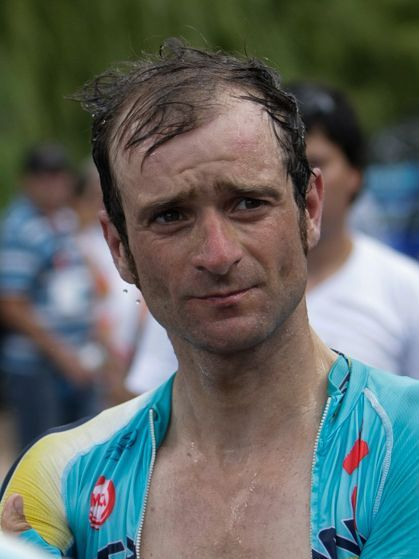
- Scarponi at the 2014 Tour de San Luis

Personal information
- Full name: Michele Scarponi
- Nickname: L'Aquila di Filottrano (The Eagle of Filottrano)
- Born: 25 September 1979 Jesi, Italy
- Died: 22 April 2017 (aged 37) Filottrano, Italy
- Height: 1.74 m (5 ft 9 in)
- Weight: 63 kg (139 lb)

Cycling career
- Sport: Cycling
- Discipline: Road
- Role: Climbing specialist Domestique

Amateur teams
- 1988–1997: Pieralisi
- 1998–2000: Zalf–Euromobil–Fior
- 2001: Site–Frezza

Professional teams
- 2002: Acqua & Sapone–Cantina Tollo
- 2003–2004: Domina Vacanze–Elitron
- 2005–2006: Liberty Seguros–Würth
- 2007: Acqua & Sapone–Caffè Mokambo
- 2008–2010: Diquigiovanni–Androni
- 2011–2013: Lampre–ISD
- 2014–2017: Astana

Major wins
- Grand Tours Giro d'Italia General classification (2011) Points classification (2011) 3 individual stages (2009, 2010) Stage races Tirreno–Adriatico (2009) Volta a Catalunya (2011) Giro del Trentino (2011)

Michele Scarponi (25 September 1979 – 22 April 2017) was an Italian road bicycle racer who rode professionally for the Acqua & Sapone–Cantina Tollo, Domina Vacanze–Elitron, Würth, Acqua & Sapone–Caffè Mokambo, Androni Giocattoli, Lampre–Merida and Astana teams from 2002 until his death in 2017. During his career, Scarponi had 21 professional victories.

He began cycling at age eight with a local team in the Marche region. Scarponi spent almost a decade with them, and won the junior Italian National Road Race Championships in 1997. He then spent four years at the amateur level with Zalf–Euromobil–Fior (1998–2000) and Site–Frezza (2001) before turning professional in 2002 with Acqua & Sapone–Cantina Tollo. For the next decade, Scarponi rode mainly for Italian teams with the exception of two-year spell with Spanish team Liberty Seguros–Würth in 2005 and 2006 (where he was a domestique during Roberto Heras' 2005 Vuelta a España success). After a doping ban, he had his first major victories in 2009 with Diquigiovanni–Androni: stage and general-classification wins in the Tirreno–Adriatico and two stage wins – both from breakaways – in the Giro d'Italia, where he was a domestique for Gilberto Simoni. He led the Androni Giocattoli team in a Grand Tour race for the first time at the 2010 Giro d'Italia, where he finished fourth overall and won a stage for the second successive year.

Scarponi spent three years with the Lampre–ISD team, from 2011 to 2013. In his first season, he won the Giro del Trentino and finished second to Alberto Contador in the Volta a Catalunya and the Giro d'Italia. Contador was stripped of those results in February 2012 after a positive test for clenbuterol at the 2010 Tour de France, and Scarponi was promoted to both victories; he also won the points classification in the Giro d'Italia. He finished fourth overall in the 2012 Giro d'Italia (losing a podium finish in the final-stage individual time trial) and the 2013 race, with no further stage wins. Scarponi joined the Astana team in 2014, initially as a team leader for that year's Giro d'Italia, before becoming a domestique for the remainder of his career for compatriots Vincenzo Nibali and Fabio Aru. In his final professional race, the 2017 Tour of the Alps, Scarponi had his first individual victory in three-and-a-half years.

During his professional career, he had two doping-related suspensions. Scarponi was implicated in 2006 in the Operación Puerto doping case conducted by the Guardia Civil in connection with Eufemiano Fuentes, Scarponi's team doctor when he rode for Liberty Seguros–Würth in 2005 and 2006. He admitted his involvement in May 2007 after meetings with the Italian National Olympic Committee (CONI), and was suspended from racing until August 2008. Scarponi received a three-month ban in late 2012 after he admitted performing medical tests with Michele Ferrari, an Italian doctor linked to a number of doping cases in cycling who had received a lifetime ban from the sport by the United States Anti-Doping Agency (USADA) earlier that year.

== Early life and amateur career ==
Scarponi was born on 25 September 1979 in the town of Jesi, in the central Italian region of Marche, to Giacomo and Flavia. He spent his childhood in Filottrano, Marche, with his brother Marco and sister Silvia. Scarponi received his first bicycle as a First Communion gift. He joined the local cycling club Pieralisi at age eight, and began to win races. In 1997, at age seventeen, Scarponi became junior national road race champion with a winning move on the climb to Castello di Caneva in the northern region of Friuli-Venezia Giulia. On the national team for the 1997 UCI Road World Championships in San Sebastián, Spain, he finished 104th in the junior road race.

In April 2001, riding for the Site–Frezza amateur team, Scarponi finished second to Yaroslav Popovych in the one-day Giro del Belvedere. In April and May, he won the fifth stage and finished second overall (again to Popovych) in the Giro delle Regioni. Scarponi finished eighth in the under-23 time trial at the UCI Road World Championships in Lisbon that October, one minute and 32.4 seconds behind winner Danny Pate of the United States.

== Professional career ==
=== 2002–2004: Turning professional ===
Scarponi turned professional in 2002 with the Acqua & Sapone–Cantina Tollo team, which folded at the end of the season. He had his first victory with that team, winning a stage of the Settimana Ciclistica Lombarda, en route to a second-place finish overall, and made his Grand Tour debut with an eighteenth-place finish in the 2002 Giro d'Italia. Scarponi moved to the Domina Vacanze–Elitron team for the 2003 season, winning a stage of the Giro d'Abruzzo and finishing third overall, and finishing in the top ten of the Amstel Gold Race (seventh) and Liège–Bastogne–Liège (fourth); the latter two were UCI Road World Cup races. He finished sixteenth in the Giro d'Italia, and thirteenth in the Vuelta a España.

Beginning the 2004 season with strong performances in the spring Italian stage races, Scarponi finished third overall and won a stage of the Settimana Internazionale di Coppi e Bartali and won the Settimana Ciclistica Lombarda two weeks later with two stage wins and victories in the points and mountain competitions. He again competed in all three Ardennes classics, finishing fourth in La Flèche Wallonne, and seventh in Liège–Bastogne–Liège. Forgoing the Giro d'Italia, Scarponi won the fourth stage of the Peace Race in Germany after joining a late-stage move and a sprint finish in Grünhain-Beierfeld. He maintained the overall lead for the remainder of the race until its finish in Prague. After a second-place finish in the June Tour of Austria, he rode in the Tour de France for the first time and finished 32nd overall.

=== 2005–2006: Liberty Seguros–Würth ===
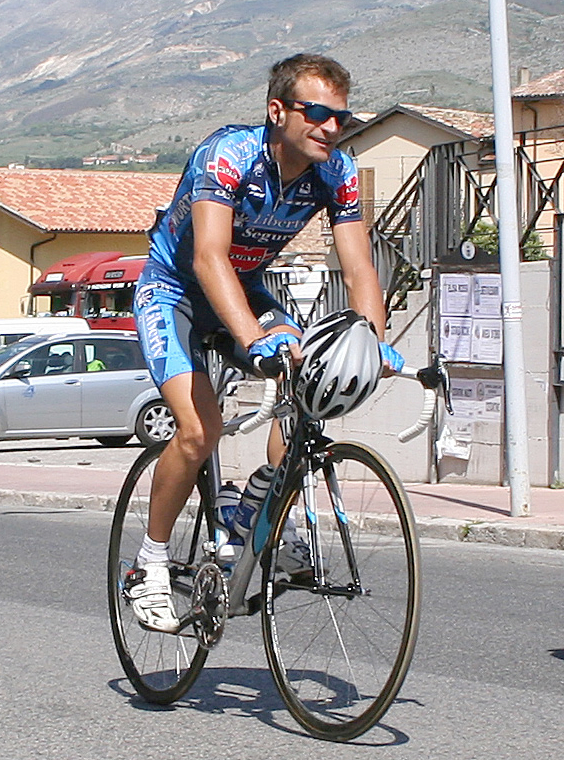
Scarponi riding for Liberty Seguros–Würth in the 2005 Giro d'Italia

Scarponi moved to the Spanish Liberty Seguros–Würth team for 2005, a quieter season than his previous ones; he did not win any races, despite his ambitions for the Giro d'Italia. He finished seventh in the Vuelta a Burgos and had his best Grand Tour finish to that point, finishing twelfth in the Vuelta a España as a domestique for Roberto Heras; Heras was disqualified after a positive test for erythropoietin (EPO), but was later reinstated. In 2006, Scarponi was implicated in the Operación Puerto doping case. His best result that year was a fifth-place finish in the thirteenth stage of the Giro d'Italia, a race he failed to finish for the first time; he did not start the seventeenth stage the day after team manager Manolo Saiz was arrested in connection with the investigation. The team folded at the end of the season, but Scarponi signed a contract with Acqua & Sapone–Caffè Mokambo in February 2007.

=== 2007: Acqua & Sapone–Caffè Mokambo ===
Scarponi began his 2007 racing season with the March Clásica de Almería, where he exceeded the time limit. He finished fifth in the Vuelta a Murcia and ninth at Tirreno–Adriatico before moving on to the Settimana Internazionale di Coppi e Bartali. Scarponi won the race's second stage, to Faenza, after attacking from the peloton with 1.6 kilometres (0.99 miles) remaining. He entered the final day two seconds behind race leader Luca Pierfelici, who then was dropped, and finished second to Riccardo Riccò in Sassuolo. Scarponi won the overall race by eight seconds over Riccò, who also passed Pierfelici in the general classification. After a fourth-place finish at the Giro d'Oro, Scarponi was second to former teammate Damiano Cunego in the Giro del Trentino; it was his final race of the season.

Scarponi was again implicated in the Operación Puerto case, meeting with the Italian National Olympic Committee (CONI) in Rome on 1 May about his apparent involvement in the investigation. A week later, one day after compatriot Ivan Basso admitted his involvement in Operación Puerto as the rider code-named "Birillo", Scarponi confirmed at another meeting with CONI that he was "Zapatero" and "Il Presidente". On 15 May, CONI requested suspensions for both riders; the request was granted the following day. Scarponi received an 18-month ban in July (effective on 15 May, the day of the CONI ban request), reduced from the normal two-year suspension due to his cooperation. In March 2008, after an appeal to the Court of Arbitration for Sport (CAS), his ban was lengthened to 21 months; allowing for Scarponi's periods of inactivity, however, he was eligible to race again on 1 August.

=== 2008–2010: Diquigiovanni–Androni ===
With Scarponi completing his ban, Diquigiovanni–Androni announced in June 2008 that they had signed him for the next two seasons. He returned to racing in the Giro dell'Appennino on 3 August, and recorded his best result of the 2008 season (seventh place) in the October Giro dell'Emilia.

==== 2009 ====
Scarponi began his 2009 season with a fifth-place finish in the Vuelta a Andalucía, supporting Davide Rebellin's unsuccessful bid to win the race. After the Italian Trofeo Laigueglia and Giro di Sardegna races in February, he moved on to the Tirreno−Adriatico. Scarponi finished fourth in the fifth-stage time trial, and won the sixth stage in Camerino. Attacking on the climb to the Sassotetto ski resort and brought back to a small group, he outlasted Stefano Garzelli and Ivan Basso on the final climb into Camerino; some gradients were 12 percent. Scarponi avoided trouble in the final stage for his first UCI World Ranking victory, 25 seconds ahead of Garzelli.

He took aim at the Giro d'Italia, where he was a main domestique for team leader Gilberto Simoni, after the Ardennes classics. After pre-race encouragement from team manager Gianni Savio, Scarponi joined the sixth-stage breakaway over the Italian–Austrian border in Mayrhofen. Dropping his final breakaway companion Vasil Kiryienka about 10 kilometres (6.2 miles) from the finish, he soloed to his first Grand Tour stage victory. Scarponi also joined the breakaway on the eighteenth stage as one of a septet of riders who broke clear of a larger group of twenty-five with 15 kilometres (9.3 miles) left to race; they contested a final sprint for Scarponi's stage win, his second of the Giro. He finished 31st in the final general-classification standings. After the Giro d'Italia, Scarponi signed a one-year contract extension with the team until the end of 2010. He rode a series of one-day races during the second half of the season, with top-ten finishes in the Prueba Villafranca de Ordizia (ninth), the Coppa Ugo Agostoni (sixth), and the Gran Premio Industria e Commercio di Prato (seventh). Scarponi was selected for the UCI Road World Championships in Mendrisio, Switzerland, but did not finish the road race.

==== 2010 ====
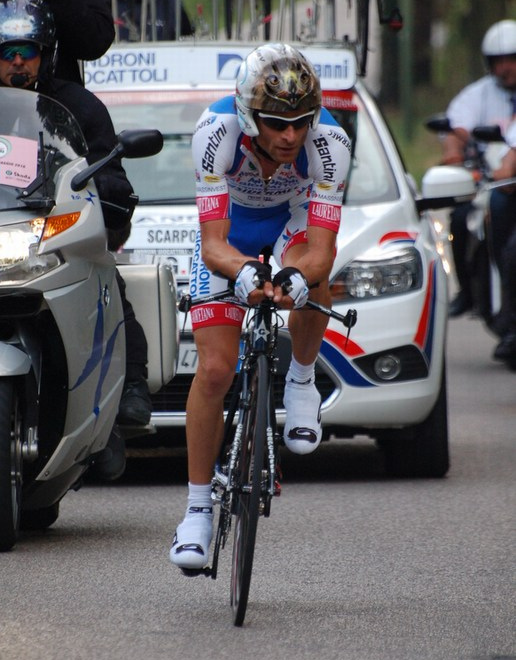
Scarponi's fourth-place finish in the 2010 Giro d'Italia was his first Grand Tour top-ten finish.

Scarponi began 2010 with top-ten finishes in the Giro di Sardegna (seventh), and the Classica Sarda (ninth) in February, before attempting to retain his Tirreno−Adriatico title. He took the race lead with a fourth-stage victory, attacking with Vincenzo Nibali before dropping Nibali on the run-in to Chieti. Scarponi then lost time to Stefano Garzelli on each of the next two stages, and went into the final day just two seconds ahead. Garzelli's Acqua & Sapone team were able to lead their captain out to gain a second in each of the stage's two intermediate sprints; with the stage suited to sprinters, Garzelli took the race overall. Scarponi won the opening-stage prologue of the Settimana Ciclistica Lombarda, where he, a 6.6-kilometre (4.1 mi) time trial up the Colle Gallo. Finishing second in two other stages, he won the overall race by 22 seconds over Riccardo Riccò. In his last warm-up race before the Giro d'Italia, Scarponi finished fourth overall in the Giro del Trentino. He missed a podium position by two seconds after Domenico Pozzovivo achieved enough of a gap to win the final stage.

Scarponi led the Androni Giocattoli team in a Grand Tour for the first time. After rarely featuring in the first half of the race, he steadily worked his way up the general classification approaching the high mountains. Scarponi finished third on successive days: in stage 14 to Monte Grappa and stage 15 to Monte Zoncolan; in the latter stage, he was in the lead group until he was distanced by Cadel Evans and Ivan Basso. He remained eighth overall until a prestigious victory in stage 19, where he went clear of the field on the Mortirolo Pass with Liquigas–Doimo teammates Nibali and Basso. Basso was attempting to take the overall lead; he and Nibali did most of the work during the dangerous descent and subsequent uphill ride to Aprica, leaving Scarponi fresh enough to out-sprint them. Scarponi moved up to fourth overall; within a second of the overall podium the following day at the Tonale Pass, he finished thirteen seconds shy in fourth place after the final-stage individual time trial in Verona. He also finished fourth in the points classification, and fifth in the mountains classification. Except for the Brixia Tour and the Vuelta a Burgos, Scarponi rode one-day races for the remainder of the season. He had three podium placings in the autumn, with a third-place finish in the Giro dell'Emilia and runner-up finishes in the Gran Premio Industria e Commercio di Prato and at the World Ranking level − in his final ride for Androni Giocattoli − in the Giro di Lombardia.

=== 2011–2013: Lampre–ISD ===
==== 2011 ====
Scarponi moved to Lampre–ISD for the 2011 season after signing a two-year contract. He made his début with the team in the Giro di Sardegna, where he won the final stage after a late attack; he finished fourth overall, missing the podium by eleven seconds. Scarponi's next race was the Tirreno–Adriatico, where he was seen as a contender but not a favourite due to his relatively weak performances in time trials. After losing time in the race-opening team time trial, Scarponi won the fourth stage to Chieti. He and five other riders went clear of the field on the final climb and, with teammate Damiano Cunego also in the move to control the pace, he pulled further away; despite fading near the end, he held on for victory a few bike lengths ahead of Cunego. Scarponi finished third in the penultimate stage and third overall, behind Cadel Evans and Robert Gesink, winning the points competition with the highest number of points for intermediate sprints and stage finishes.

He rode well in Milan–San Remo, the season's first Monument classic. After missing a split in the field, Scarponi attacked on the Cipressa and bridged a one-minute gap to the lead group. He remained with the group until the finish – where he finished sixth, his best result in that race. Scarponi then rode in the Volta a Catalunya several days later, finishing second overall to Alberto Contador. Before the Giro del Trentino, Scarponi trained at altitude on Mount Etna and his room was searched by Italian police. He won the Giro del Trentino, breaking clear with Thomas Voeckler on the final climb of the second stage; they remained clear to the end, with Voeckler winning the sprint and Scarponi taking the overall lead. Scarponi kept the lead for the rest of the race, winning it for the first time. After the race, he studied the Giro d'Italia's stages in the Dolomites.

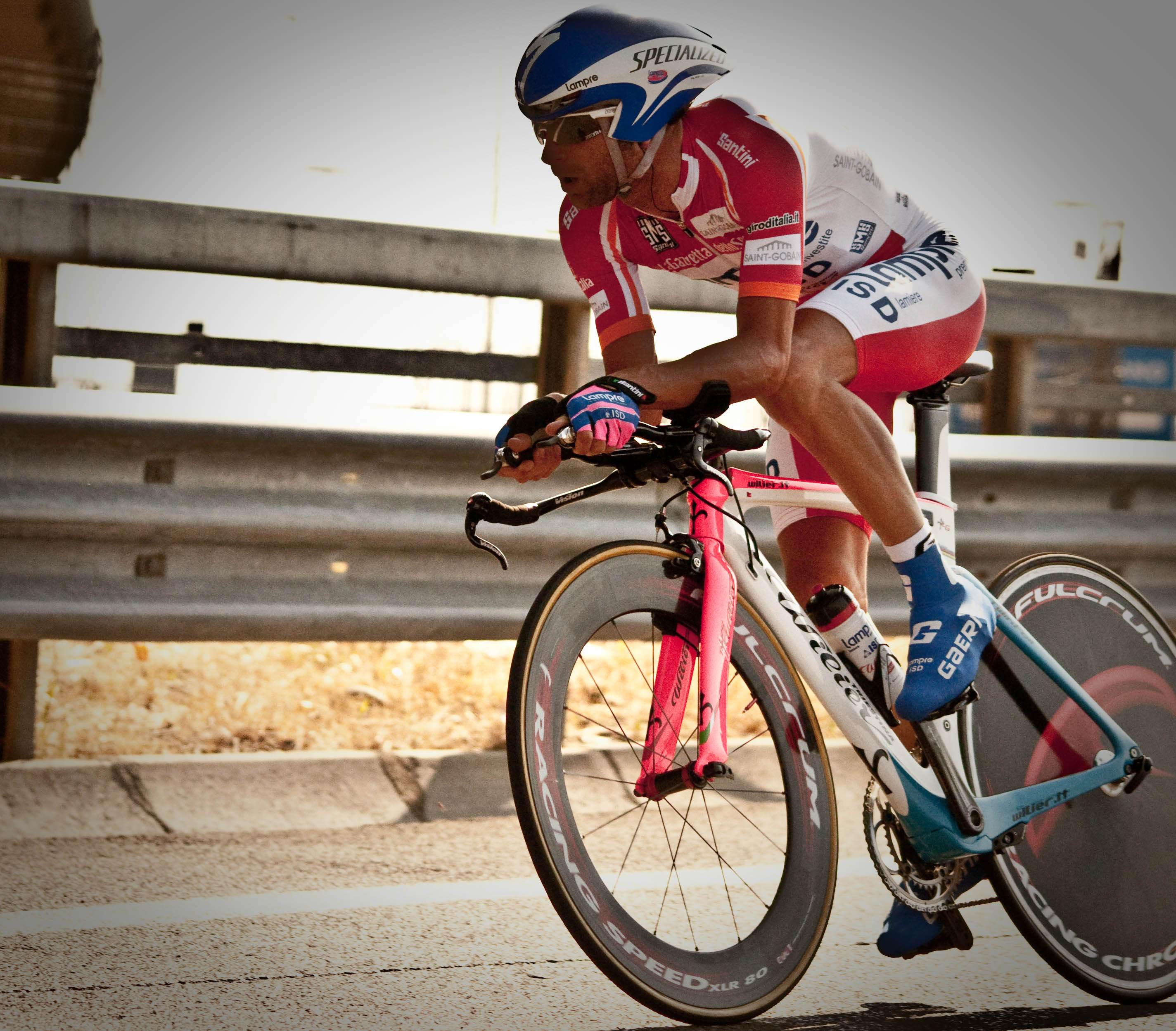
Scarponi in the 2011 Giro d'Italia, which he won retroactively after Alberto Contador's February 2012 disqualification

In the Giro, after a "satisfying" team time trial by Lampre–ISD on day one, Scarponi almost won the seventh stage; he finished second to Bart De Clercq by a tyre length after trying to chase him down in the final kilometre. The time bonus put him in fifth place, fourteen seconds from the race lead. He lost time on the ninth stage, the most difficult stage to that point with its finish on Mount Etna. After trying to follow an attack by Alberto Contador, he quickly lost the pace and lost 67 seconds to Contador. Commentators said that Scarponi was "left wanting both physically and tactically" and paid for his efforts on the climb, although he remained in fifth place overall. Lampre–ISD led the peloton at the end of the eleventh stage to set Scarponi up for the stage victory in Castelfidardo; however, John Gadret made a surprise attack in the final kilometre to win the stage. Scarponi finished eighth, praising his team (particularly Alessandro Petacchi) for their hard work at the front for much of the day. He reached the halfway point of the Giro in fifth place, 88 seconds behind race leader Contador. Before the race's second rest day, there was a triumvirate of mountaintop finishes in the Dolomites (stages thirteen to fifteen): at the Grossglockner in Austria, Monte Zoncolan and Gardeccia.

Scarponi was an early attacker on the first climb, but could not make up much ground; Contador finished second to José Rujano in the stage, increasing his lead by almost two minutes. Scarponi moved into third overall, trailing by three-and-a-quarter minutes. On the Zoncolan, Scarponi initially followed Igor Antón and Contador but could not keep up; he was overtaken by Nibali, who had approached from the following group. He lost another fifty seconds to Contador, and fell to fourth place overall as Antón moved ahead of him. Scarponi was much closer to Contador on the Gardeccia climb, losing just fourteen seconds; he finished well ahead of Antón and Nibali, and moved into second place in the overall classification. With Contador so far ahead, much of the race's focus shifted to the battle for second place between Scarponi and Nibali. The climbing time trial of stage 16 saw Scarponi lose four seconds to Nibali as he tried to limit his losses before the final-stage time trial. Nibali closed in by 13 seconds – to 34 seconds – on stage 19, but lost the ground he had gained the following day as he was dropped by the Scarponi–Contador group and lost 22 seconds by the finish in Sestriere. A weaker time trialist than Nibali, Scarponi lost ten seconds over the 26-kilometre (16 mi) distance to finish second overall by forty-six seconds; he said he was "satisfied" with his overall performance in the Giro, despite finishing over six minutes behind Contador.

He rode the Vuelta a España later in the season, again leading the Lampre–ISD team. He finished second to Joaquim Rodríguez on the eighth stage, but was not a major factor in the general classification; he abandoned in stage 14, trailing overall leader Bradley Wiggins by over 24 minutes. In February 2012, Contador was stripped of his victories in the Volta a Catalunya and the Giro d'Italia after a ruling by the Court of Arbitration for Sport (CAS) following his positive test for clenbuterol at the 2010 Tour de France. With Scarponi finishing second in both 2011 races, he was promoted to first place.

==== 2012 ====
Scarponi's first stage race of the season was March's Tirreno–Adriatico, where he finished seventh overall. In the Tour of the Basque Country, he was in the lead group on the final third-stage climb to Eibar before fading to seventh place. Scarponi finished the race in eighth place overall. He finished sixth in the April Giro dell'Appennino, and eighth in Liège–Bastogne–Liège. Promoted to the 2011 victory earlier in the year, Scarponi was poised to defend his Giro d'Italia title in May and led the Lampre–ISD team with Damiano Cunego a main domestique.

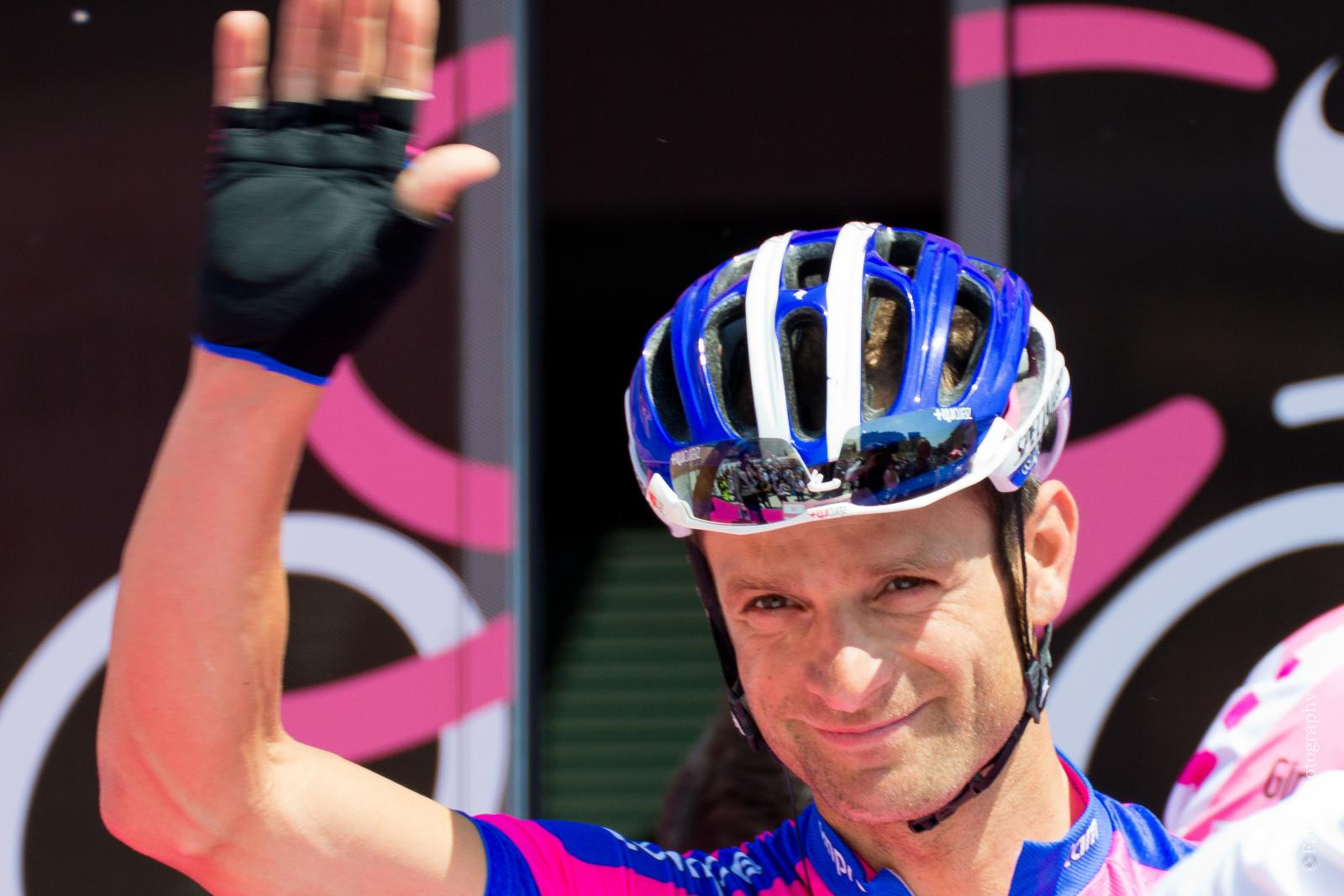
Scarponi before the start of the fifth stage of the 2012 Giro d'Italia

After losing time in both time trials during the first four stages, Scarponi advanced with the race's first summit finish – stage seven – at Rocca di Cambio. Lampre–ISD led the peloton before the climb, with Przemysław Niemiec protecting Scarponi, before Scarponi attacked on the climb. Astana's Paolo Tiralongo went with him; Scarponi held the lead until the final corner, when Tiralongo came around outside for the victory. Scarponi moved into the top ten of the overall classification after stage 14, and worked his way into the top five three stages later with a sixth-place finish in stage 17. In a lead group of six riders on the Giau Pass, he and Rigoberto Urán were dropped near the top of the climb but made it back to the lead group on the descent into Cortina d'Ampezzo. In stage 19, which finished on the Pampeago Pass, Scarponi could not breach the group of overall contenders on the final climb. He finished the stage in fourth place, however, and moved up to third overall.

The race's penultimate stage was also its queen stage; five categorised climbs were on the parcours, the last two of which were the first-category Mortirolo Pass and the final, Cima Coppi hors catégorie Stelvio Pass. On the Stelvio, Ryder Hesjedal set a pace that only Joaquim Rodríguez and Scarponi could follow. In the final 5 kilometres (3.1 miles), Scarponi attacked; he was closely followed by Rodríguez, with no movement from Hesjedal. Rodríguez passed Scarponi for fourth in the stage; with Thomas De Gendt gaining nearly four minutes winning the stage, Scarponi held an advantage of just under half a minute going into the final time trial. De Gendt was expected to reach the podium because he was a better time-trialist than Scarponi. De Gendt was first to ride, recording a time of 34 minutes and seven seconds – good enough for a fifth-place stage finish – and more than enough to move ahead of Scarponi, who recorded a time of 35 minutes. Scarponi finished fourth overall, with Hesjedal taking the overall win.

After the Giro d'Italia, Scarponi signed a one-year extension to his contract – until the end of the 2013 season – before deciding to focus on the Tour de France: a race he had not ridden since 2004. He lost over two minutes in the sixth stage after being delayed by what became known as the "Metz Massacre", a crash that involved a large proportion of the peloton. Trailing by over ten minutes after the ninth-stage time trial, Scarponi featured in the following day's breakaway. After the group broke apart on the Col du Grand Colombier, he was one of five riders who remained clear to the end of the stage and finished second (behind Thomas Voeckler) at the finish in Bellegarde-sur-Valserine. Scarponi was not a factor in the second part of the race and finished 24th overall, almost an hour behind winner Bradley Wiggins.

He was suspended by his team in November 2012 after he admitted performing tests with Michele Ferrari, a doctor linked to a number of doping cases. Scarponi's salary was reportedly €700,000 a year. The Italian National Olympic Committee (CONI) requested a three-month ban for Scarponi and Giovanni Visconti for working with Ferrari; the ban, retroactive from 1 October, was finalised on 12 December and enabled Scarponi to race again at the start of the 2013 season.

==== 2013 ====
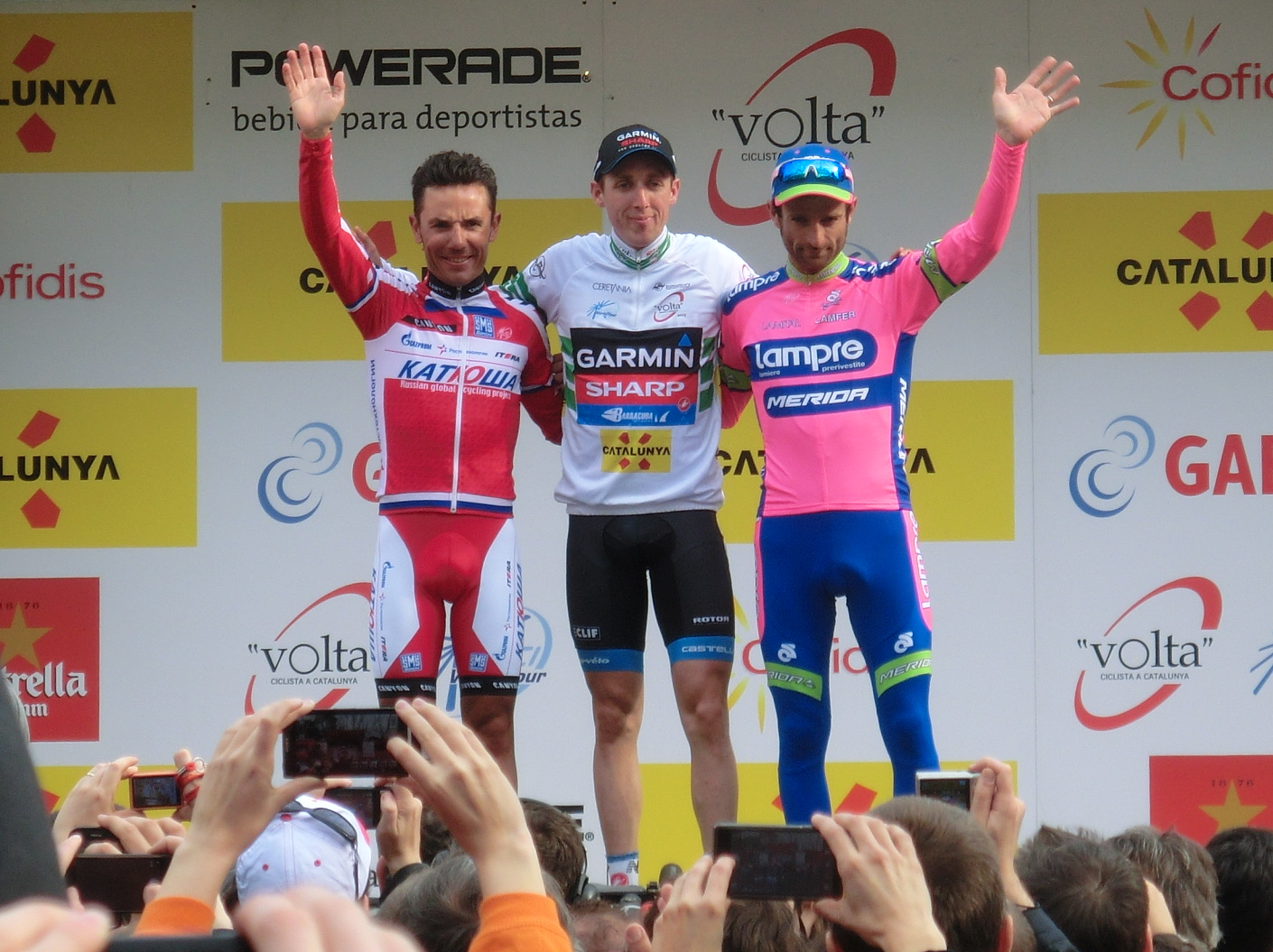
The 2013 Volta a Catalunya final general classification podium; Scarponi was third, behind Dan Martin and Joaquim Rodríguez.

Scarponi began his season at the end of February, finishing tenth in the Gran Premio Città di Camaiore. He had two top-ten placings in Paris–Nice, before moving on to the Volta a Catalunya. Scarponi was fifth going into the race's final stage in Barcelona, but bridged a 20-second gap to reach three race leaders. He remained there, finishing fourth in the stage; a 21-second gap to the peloton enabled him to move up two places into third overall, passing Nairo Quintana and Bradley Wiggins. After riding the Giro del Trentino, Scarponi continued his warmup for the Giro d'Italia with his fourth top-ten finish in Liège–Bastogne–Liège; he finished fifth after losing a sprint with Alejandro Valverde and Carlos Betancur.

He again led Lampre–Merida in the Giro d'Italia. Scarponi reached the top ten in stage results only once during the first half of the race, but never fell below sixth after the eighth stage; he finished fourth overall, like 2010 and 2012. After riding in the Tour de Suisse, Scarponi rode in the National Road Race Championships on the Trofeo Melinda course. He was part of a three-man move with Ivan Santaromita and Davide Rebellin which remained clear until the end of the race and got the better of Rebellin at the finish, but was out-sprinted by Santaromita. Scarponi then continued his progression towards the Vuelta a España with the Tour de Pologne.

Scarponi finished 15th overall in the Vuelta a España, with a best stage placing (second) in the fifteenth stage at Peyragudes; part of a 28-man breakaway, he was one of two riders to remain clear of the peloton but finished over three minutes behind stage winner Alexandre Geniez. He won the delayed Gran Premio della Costa Etruschi, his first success since his belated 2011 Giro d'Italia victory; Scarponi attacked from the lead group with one kilometre (0.62 mi) to go in a rare 1–2–3 success for his team, with Diego Ulissi and Filippo Pozzato completing the podium. He was selected for the UCI Road World Championships in Florence, where he finished sixteenth – the second-best Italian, behind Vincenzo Nibali – in the road race. Scarponi finished the season with an eighth-place finish in the Giro dell'Emilia, and decided not to extend his contract with Lampre–Merida.

=== 2014–2017: Astana ===
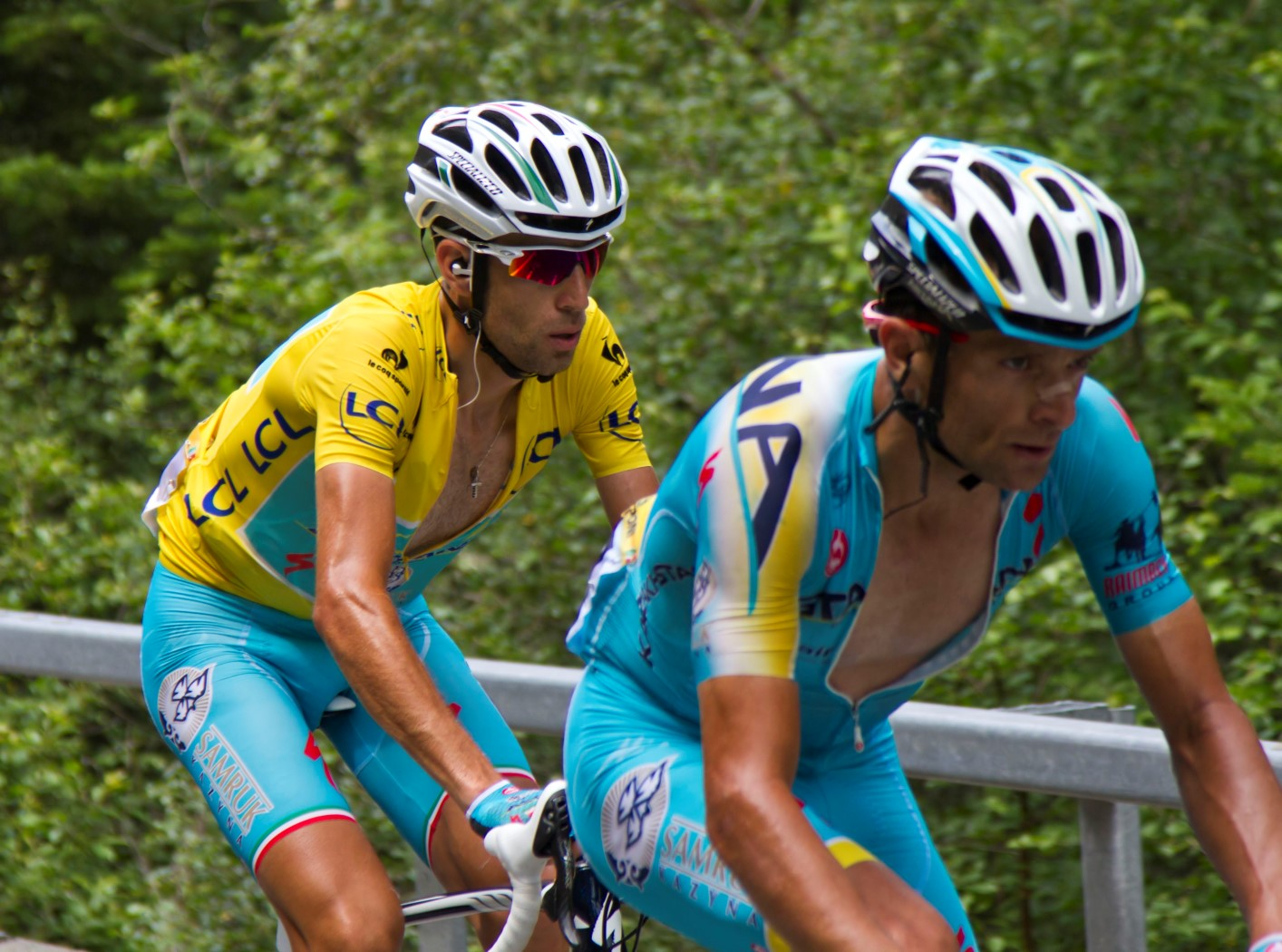
Scarponi (right) in the 2014 Tour de France, riding in support of Astana teammate and eventual winner Vincenzo Nibali

For the 2014 season, Scarponi moved to the Astana squad with an initial one-year contract. His first race with the team was January's Tour de San Luis, and he had top-ten finishes in three stage races during the spring: ninth in the Vuelta a Andalucía and Tirreno–Adriatico, and eighth in the Giro del Trentino. Scarponi was selected as the team leader for the Giro d'Italia and was a pre-race favourite for the general classification, saying that he was "optimistic" about his chances. He crashed during stage six, losing almost two minutes, and lost another ten minutes two stages later as the team leadership began to gravitate towards Fabio Aru; Scarponi withdrew from the race during stage sixteen. In the Tour de France, he was a key domestique for overall winner Vincenzo Nibali.

Scarponi remained with Astana into the 2015 season. He led the squad in the Tour of the Basque Country, where he finished sixth overall and sixth in two stages. Scarponi and Nibali rode in the Tour de Romandie, where Scarponi missed a top-ten overall result – to Nibali – by eight seconds. He again rode in support of Nibali, who placed fourth overall, in the Tour de France. Scarponi was part of the squad which won the team time trial in the Vuelta a Burgos' second stage and finished second overall, two seconds behind teammate Rein Taaramäe, and with two fourth-place stage finishes.

In September 2015, it was announced that Scarponi had again extended his contract for another year with Astana. He began his season with the Tour de San Luis before moving on to the spring Italian stage races. Scarponi dropped out of Tirreno–Adriatico, failing to start the final time-trial stage after fracturing his collarbone the previous day. He missed a month of racing as the injury healed, and returned to competition at the Giro del Trentino. Astana won the race-opening time trial; Scarponi was primarily a domestique and finished fourteenth overall, with Tanel Kangert winning the race's final two stages. He was a key domestique for overall winner Vincenzo Nibali in the Giro d'Italia, helping Nibali come from nearly five minutes down in the overall standings to win the race by 52 seconds over Esteban Chaves. Scarponi rode in the Tour de Suisse before a mid-summer break, when he announced another 12-month contract extension for 2017. He rode in the Vuelta a Burgos as a warm-up for the Vuelta a España, where Astana won the team time trial as they had done in 2015. Scarponi led his team at the Vuelta a España with three top-ten stage finishes, finishing eleventh overall.

He began the 2017 season with the February Volta a la Comunitat Valenciana and Volta ao Algarve races, finishing in the top twenty of both. Scarponi was fifteenth overall in Tirreno–Adriatico before moving on to the Tour of the Alps, the successor of the Giro del Trentino with an additional foray into Austria. In the opening stage, he was part of an elite group who moved clear on the final climb in Hungerburg, Austria. Scarponi out-sprinted the group for his first individual victory since his 2013 Gran Premio della Costa Etruschi success, and finished fourth overall.

== Death ==
On 22 April 2017, after completing the Tour of the Alps the day before, Scarponi was on a training ride for that year's Giro d'Italia; he was due to lead the Astana team after Fabio Aru withdrew due to injury. He was riding along the SP 362 provincial road (Via dell'Industria), one kilometre (0.62 miles) from the centre of his home town of Filottrano, at about 08:00 local time when he was struck at the via Schiavoni intersection by an Iveco Daily van driven by local 57-year-old craftsman Giuseppe Giacconi. According to statements to the Carabinieri (Italian police), Giacconi did not see Scarponi. He was known by Scarponi's father, Giacomo, who said: "We know each other well. I've lost a son, but I'm thinking of him too." The criminal investigation ended in mid-February 2018, after Giacconi died of cancer.

In the days following Scarponi's death, tributes were paid at professional races: the Tour of Croatia the following day had a moment of silence, and Liège–Bastogne–Liège the day after that included a round of applause. In both races, riders wore black armbands. Alejandro Valverde won Liège–Bastogne–Liège, and donated his prize money to Scarponi's family. Former teammate and close friend Vincenzo Nibali dedicated his overall victory in the Tour of Croatia to Scarponi. A moment of silence was also observed before the Juventus–Genoa Serie A football match in Turin. Scarponi's funeral, officiated by Cardinal Edoardo Menichelli on 25 April at Filottrano's football stadium, was attended by an estimated 5,000 mourners.

On 30 April 2017, it was announced that Astana would ride the Giro d'Italia with only eight riders in honour of Scarponi. Race officials dedicated stage sixteen's Mortirolo Pass climb – which played a part in his 2010 final-stage victory – to Scarponi, giving the lead rider double points in the mountains classification. Peter Sagan dedicated his victory in the September World Road Race Championships to Scarponi, and it was announced in January 2018 that the March Tirreno–Adriatico would include a stage finish in his home town of Filottrano. Scarponi was commemorated during the 2022 Giro d'Italia, when a mural of his pet parrot (who normally accompanied him on his training rides) was unveiled at the site of his death. The race's tenth stage featured an intermediate sprint in Filottrano, about 44 kilometres (27 miles) from the finish in his birthplace Jesi.

== Personal life ==
Scarponi was married to Anna Tommasi. They have twin sons, Giacomo and Tommaso.

== Major results ==
1997
1st Road race, National Junior Road Championships
3rd Grand Prix Rüebliland
2001
1st Memorial Danilo Furlan
2nd Overall Giro delle Regioni

1st Stage 5

2nd Giro del Belvedere
4th Trofeo Banca Popolare di Vicenza
8th Time trial, UCI Under-23 Road World Championships
2002
1st Stage 4 Giro del Trentino
2nd Overall Settimana Ciclistica Lombarda

1st Stage 3b (ITT)

8th Overall Settimana Internazionale di Coppi e Bartali
2003
1st Gran Premio Fred Mengoni
3rd Overall Giro d'Abruzzo

1st Points classification
1st Stage 3

4th Liège–Bastogne–Liège
6th Overall Settimana Internazionale di Coppi e Bartali
7th Amstel Gold Race
9th Züri-Metzgete
2004
1st Overall Settimana Ciclistica Lombarda

1st Points classification
1st Mountains classification
1st Stages 1 & 2

1st Overall Peace Race

1st Stage 4

2nd Overall Tour of Austria
3rd Overall Settimana Internazionale di Coppi e Bartali

1st Stage 4

4th La Flèche Wallonne
7th Liège–Bastogne–Liège
2005
7th Overall Vuelta a Burgos
2006
6th Overall Vuelta a Castilla y León
2007
1st Overall Settimana Internazionale di Coppi e Bartali

1st Stage 2

2nd Overall Giro del Trentino
4th Giro d'Oro
5th Overall Vuelta a Murcia
9th Overall Tirreno–Adriatico
2008
7th Giro dell'Emilia
2009
1st Overall Tirreno–Adriatico

1st Stage 6

Giro d'Italia

1st Stages 6 & 18

5th Overall Vuelta a Andalucía
6th Coppa Ugo Agostoni
7th Gran Premio Industria e Commercio di Prato
9th Prueba Villafranca de Ordizia
2010
1st Overall Settimana Ciclistica Lombarda

1st Prologue

2nd Overall Tirreno–Adriatico

1st Stage 4

2nd Giro di Lombardia
2nd Gran Premio Industria e Commercio di Prato
3rd Giro dell'Emilia
4th Overall Giro d'Italia

1st Stage 19

4th Overall Giro del Trentino
7th Overall Giro di Sardegna
9th Classica Sarda
10th Coppa Ugo Agostoni
10th Giro di Toscana
2011
1st Overall Giro d'Italia (Note: In February 2012, Alberto Contador was stripped of all his race results recorded from the 2010 Tour de France onwards, following his positive test for clenbuterol at that race, which resulted in his suspension from cycling. As a consequence, Scarponi was retroactively promoted one position in the standings.)

1st Points classification

1st Overall Volta a Catalunya

1st Stage 3

1st Overall Giro del Trentino
3rd Overall Tirreno–Adriatico

1st Points classification
1st Stage 4

4th UCI World Tour (Note: Scarponi was promoted to fourth overall, following the removal of points scored by Alberto Contador, who had initially finished third overall.)
4th Overall Giro di Sardegna

1st Stage 5

6th Milan–San Remo
2012
4th Overall Giro d'Italia
6th Giro dell'Appennino
7th Overall Tirreno–Adriatico
8th Overall Tour of the Basque Country
8th Liège–Bastogne–Liège
2013
1st Gran Premio della Costa Etruschi
2nd Road race, National Road Championships
3rd Overall Volta a Catalunya
4th Overall Giro d'Italia
5th Liège–Bastogne–Liège
8th Giro dell'Emilia
10th Gran Premio Città di Camaiore
2014
8th Overall Giro del Trentino
9th Overall Vuelta a Andalucía
9th Overall Tirreno–Adriatico
2015
2nd Overall Vuelta a Burgos

1st Stage 2 (TTT)

6th Overall Tour of the Basque Country
2016
1st Stage 1 (TTT) Giro del Trentino
1st Stage 2 (TTT) Vuelta a Burgos
2017
4th Overall Tour of the Alps

1st Stage 1

=== General classification results timeline ===
Grand Tour general classification results
Grand Tour	2002	2003	2004	2005	2006	2007	2008	2009	2010	2011	2012	2013	2014	2015	2016	2017
Giro d'Italia	18	16	—	47	DNF	—	—	32	4	1	4	4	DNF	—	16	—
Tour de France	—	—	32	—	—	—	—	—	—	—	24	—	49	41	—	—
/ Vuelta a España	—	13	—	12	—	—	—	—	—	DNF	—	15	—	—	11	—
Major stage race general classification results
Race	2002	2003	2004	2005	2006	2007	2008	2009	2010	2011	2012	2013	2014	2015	2016	2017
Paris–Nice	—	—	—	—	—	—	—	—	—	—	—	30	—	—	—	—
/ Tirreno–Adriatico	—	—	—	60	57	9	—	1	2	3	7	—	9	23	DNF	15
Volta a Catalunya	—	—	—	—	—	—	—	—	—	1	—	3	—	—	—	—
Tour of the Basque Country	—	—	—	—	—	—	—	—	—	—	8	—	—	6	—	—
Tour de Romandie	—	—	—	—	66	—	—	—	—	—	—	—	—	11	—	—
Critérium du Dauphiné	—	—	—	—	—	—	—	—	—	—	—	—	—	27	—	—
Tour de Suisse	—	—	—	—	40	—	—	—	—	—	—	21	—	—	27	—

=== Monuments results timeline ===
Monument	2003	2004	2005	2006	2007	2008	2009	2010	2011	2012	2013	2014	2015
Milan–San Remo	—	—	133	—	—	—	46	30	6	—	—	—	21
Tour of Flanders	Did not contest during his career												
Paris–Roubaix	Did not contest during his career												
Liège–Bastogne–Liège	4	7	—	—	—	—	34	—	—	8	5	—	41
Giro di Lombardia	DNF	DNF	DNF	—	—	56	86	2	—	—	DNF	DNF	DNF

Legend
—	Did not compete
DNF	Did not finish
