= Forcella Staulanza =

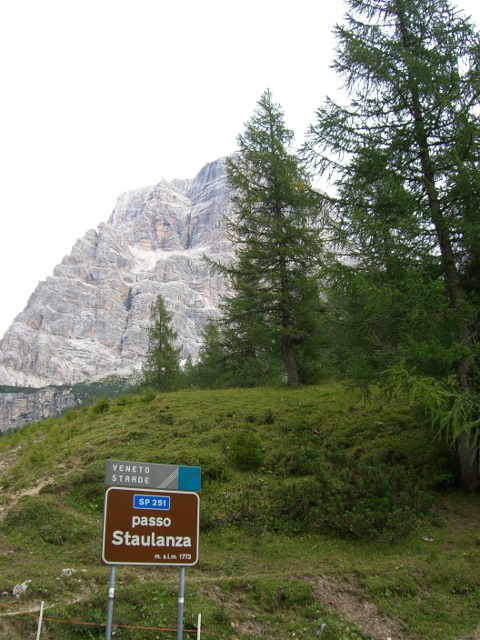
- The sign at the summit

- Location within Alps
- Elevation: 1,766 metres (5,794 ft)
- Traversed by: SP251

Third Approach
- Location: Belluno, Italy
- Range: Dolomites
- Coordinates: 46°25′14″N 12°06′14″E

Forcella Staulanza (el. 1766 m.) is a high mountain pass in the Dolomites in the province of Belluno in Italy.

It connects the Zoldo valley in the south and the Fiorentina valley in the north.

== See also ==
- List of highest paved roads in Europe
- List of mountain passes
