= 2012 Giro d'Italia =

2012 UCI World Tour, race 15 of 28
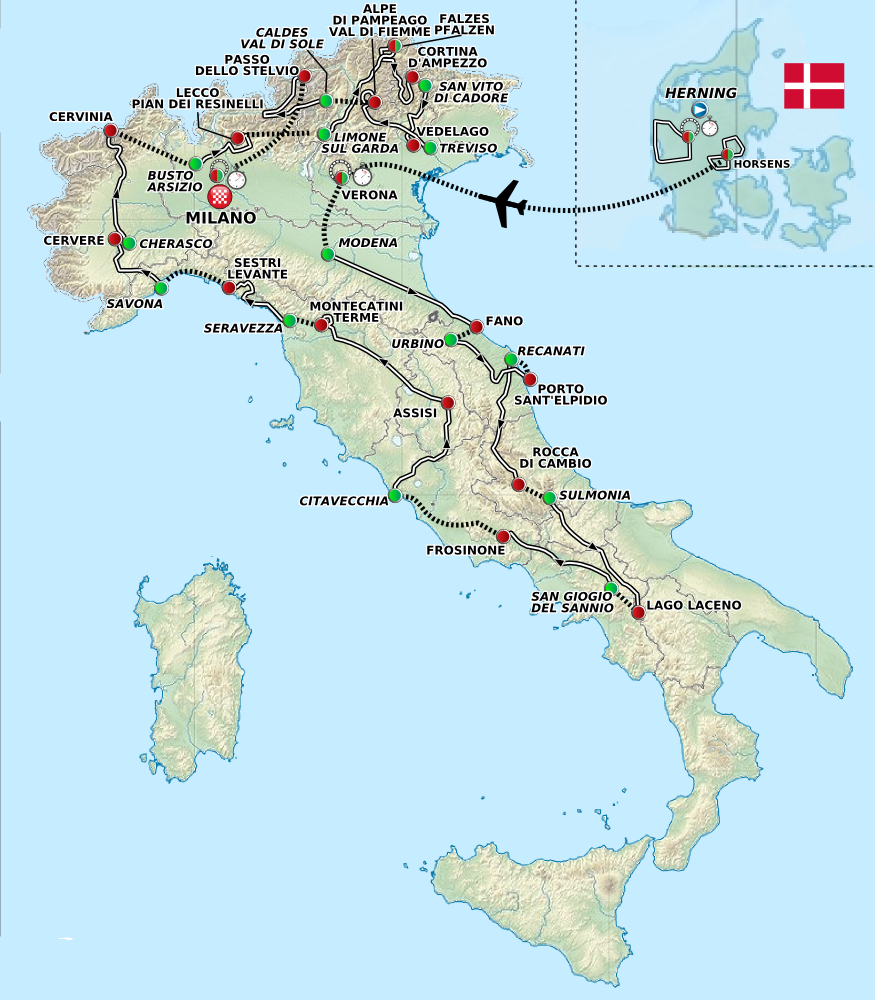

Race details
- Dates: 5–27 May 2012
- Stages: 21
- Distance: 3,502.1 km (2,176.1 mi)
- Winning time: 91h 39' 02"

Results
Jersey awarded to the overall winner	Winner	Ryder Hesjedal (CAN)	(Garmin–Barracuda)
	Second	Joaquim Rodríguez (ESP)	(Team Katusha)
	Third	Thomas De Gendt (BEL)	(Vacansoleil–DCM)
Jersey awarded to the points classification winner	Points	Joaquim Rodríguez (ESP)	(Team Katusha)
Jersey awarded to the mountains classification winner	Mountains	Matteo Rabottini (ITA)	(Farnese Vini–Selle Italia)
Jersey awarded to the young rider classification winner	Young rider	Rigoberto Urán (COL)	(Team Sky)
	Team	Lampre–ISD	
	Team points	Garmin–Barracuda	

The 2012 Giro d'Italia was the 95th edition of Giro d'Italia, one of cycling's Grand Tours. It started in the Danish city of Herning, and ended in Milan. The complete route of the 2012 Giro d'Italia was announced in mid October. For the first time since the 2007 edition no climbing time trial was included in the route. The colour of the jersey for the mountains classification was changed for this year's edition from green to blue. The move came at the behest of sponsor Banca Mediolanum, who renewed its support of the mountains classification for a further four years.

The race was won by Canada's Ryder Hesjedal of Garmin–Barracuda, becoming the first Canadian rider to win a Grand Tour event and the second non-European rider to win the Giro (the first being Andrew Hampsten in 1988); he also became only the second rider to take the leader's jersey from another rider on the final day, after Francesco Moser did so in 1984. Hesjedal won the general classification by 16 seconds over runner-up Joaquim Rodríguez of Spain, representing Team Katusha – the closest race-winning margin since Eddy Merckx beat Gianbattista Baronchelli by 12 seconds in the 1974 edition – who also won two stages and the points classification title, edging out Team Sky sprinter Mark Cavendish by one point. Third place was taken by Vacansoleil–DCM's Thomas De Gendt of Belgium, after he put in strong performances on the final two stages of the race; he won the race's queen stage, finishing at the high-point of the itinerary, at the Stelvio Pass and also finished in the top five of the time trial. As such, he gained sufficient time to move up from ninth to third over those stages, becoming the first Belgian rider to take a Grand Tour podium since Johan Bruyneel finished third at the 1995 Vuelta a España.

In the race's other classifications, Team Sky rider Rigoberto Urán of Colombia finished as the best rider aged 25 or under in the general classification, finishing in seventh place overall; the mountains competition was won by Italy's Matteo Rabottini of the Farnese Vini–Selle Italia team, scoring almost double the number of points that his nearest rival in the standings accrued. Rabottini was the only Italian to feature on the podium, as for the first time since 1995, no Italian riders finished in the top three overall, as Lampre–ISD's Michele Scarponi – the defending champion – could only finish fourth overall.

== Teams ==
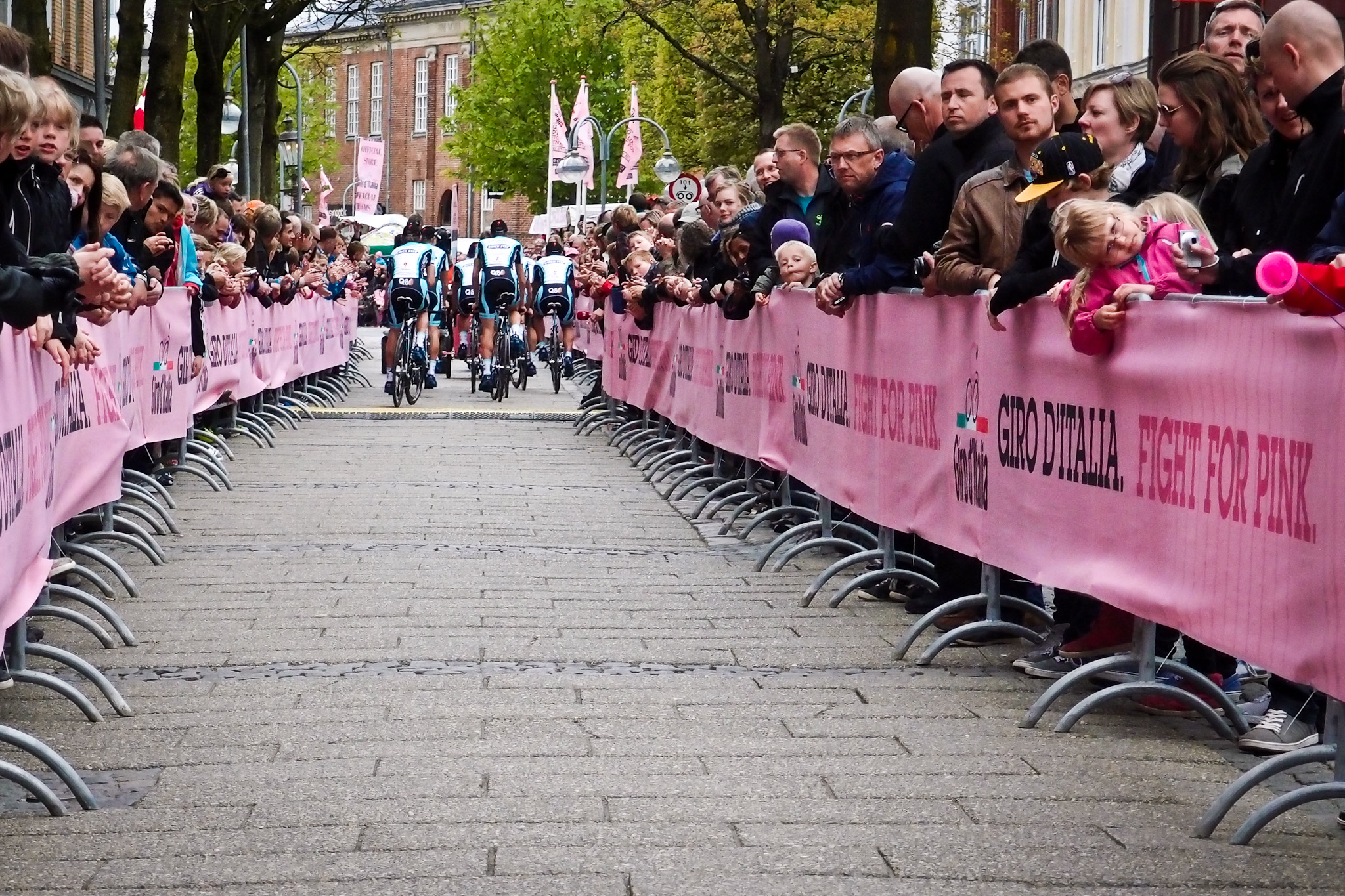
2012 Giro d'Italia team presentation in Herning

All 18 UCI ProTeams were automatically invited and were obliged to attend. In addition four UCI Professional Continental were announced in January 2012. The full list of participating teams is:

ProTeams

- Ag2r–La Mondiale
- Astana
- BMC Racing Team
- Euskaltel–Euskadi
- FDJ–BigMat
- Garmin–Barracuda

Professional Continental Teams

- Androni Giocattoli–Venezuela
- Colnago–CSF Bardiani

- Team Katusha
- Lampre–ISD
- Liquigas–Cannondale
- Lotto–Belisol
- Movistar Team
- Omega Pharma–Quick-Step

- Farnese Vini–Selle Italia
- Team NetApp

- Orica–GreenEDGE
- Rabobank
- RadioShack–Nissan
- Team Saxo Bank
- Team Sky
- Vacansoleil–DCM

== Pre-race favourites ==
2011 winner Alberto Contador was banned for two years on 6 February for doping during 2010 Tour de France and therefore did not start in the Giro. Ivan Basso, winner of the Giro of 2006 and 2010, announced on 13 November 2011 that he was aiming for a third pink jersey.

Johan Bruyneel, manager of the new fusion team between Leopard-Trek and Team Radioshack, stated that it would be hard for three-time runner-up Andy Schleck and his brother Fränk Schleck to win the 2012 Tour de France because of the large number of kilometers against the clock. There was a chance that one of the brothers would target the Giro d'Italia instead. On 19 November 2011 Fränk initially announced that the Schleck brothers would not ride the Giro and will focus on the Tour despite the time trialing kilometers. Eventually on 29 April 2012 it was announced that Fränk Schleck would replace the injured Jakob Fuglsang as the team leader during the race.

On 17 April Michele Scarponi, winner of the 2011 edition after Contador's suspension, announced that he wanted to win the Giro on the road and not after a suspension of another rider. Scarponi teamed-up with Lampre–ISD teammate and 2004 Giro d'Italia winner Damiano Cunego. Cunego aimed for a high finish in the Giro and skipped the 2012 Tour de France due to the large amount of time trialing kilometers.

Other riders named as overall contenders were Ag2r–La Mondiale's John Gadret (third overall in the 2011 Giro d'Italia), 2011 Youth classification winner Roman Kreuziger of team Astana, Team Katusha's Joaquim Rodríguez (fourth overall in the 2011 Giro d'Italia) and the Venezuelan climber José Rujano of the Androni Giocattoli team.

== Route and stages ==
The first three stages were announced on 5 October 2011, with the remaining stages announced on 16 October. On 18 April 2012 it was announced that the route for Stage 12 Seravezza to Sestri Levante had been altered because the coastal road through the Cinque Terre remains unusable following the severe landslides which struck the area on 25 October 2011. The new route is 155 km (96 mi) long.

The stages were divided into five categories of difficulty; category A, B for flat stages (from A for "stages presenting no particular difficulty"), category C for medium mountain stage, category D for mountain stages and category E for time trial stages. These categories were used to determine the time limit on the stage.

Stage characteristics and winners
Stage	Date	Course	Distance	Type	Winner
1	5 May	Herning (Denmark)	8.7 km (5.4 mi)	Individual time trial	Taylor Phinney (USA)
2	6 May	Herning (Denmark)	206 km (128 mi)	Flat stage	Mark Cavendish (GBR)
3	7 May	Horsens (Denmark)	190 km (118 mi)	Flat stage	Matthew Goss (AUS)
	8 May	Rest day			
4	9 May	Verona	33.2 km (20.6 mi)	Team time trial	Garmin–Barracuda
5	10 May	Modena to Fano	209 km (130 mi)	Flat stage	Mark Cavendish (GBR)
6	11 May	Urbino to Porto Sant'Elpidio	210 km (130 mi)	Medium mountain stage	Miguel Ángel Rubiano (COL)
7	12 May	Recanati to Rocca di Cambio	205 km (127 mi)	Medium mountain stage	Paolo Tiralongo (ITA)
8	13 May	Sulmona to Lago Laceno	229 km (142 mi)	Medium mountain stage	Domenico Pozzovivo (ITA)
9	14 May	San Giorgio del Sannio to Frosinone	166 km (103 mi)	Flat stage	Francisco Ventoso (ESP)
10	15 May	Civitavecchia to Assisi	186 km (116 mi)	Hilly stage	Joaquim Rodríguez (ESP)
11	16 May	Assisi to Montecatini Terme	255 km (158 mi)	Hilly stage	Roberto Ferrari (ITA)
12	17 May	Seravezza to Sestri Levante	155 km (96 mi)	Medium mountain stage	Lars Bak (DEN)
13	18 May	Savona to Cervere	121 km (75 mi)	Flat stage	Mark Cavendish (GBR)
14	19 May	Cherasco to Cervinia	206 km (128 mi)	Mountain stage	Andrey Amador (CRC)
15	20 May	Busto Arsizio to Lecco–Pian dei Resinelli	169 km (105 mi)	Mountain stage	Matteo Rabottini (ITA)
	21 May	Rest day			
16	22 May	Limone sul Garda to Pfalzen	173 km (107 mi)	Hilly stage	Ion Izagirre (ESP)
17	23 May	Pfalzen to Cortina d'Ampezzo	186 km (116 mi)	Mountain stage	Joaquim Rodríguez (ESP)
18	24 May	San Vito di Cadore to Vedelago	149 km (93 mi)	Flat stage	Andrea Guardini (ITA)
19	25 May	Treviso to Alpe di Pampeago	198 km (123 mi)	Mountain stage	Roman Kreuziger (CZE)
20	26 May	Caldes-Val di Sole to Stelvio Pass	219 km (136 mi)	Mountain stage	Thomas De Gendt (BEL)
21	27 May	Milan	28.2 km (17.5 mi)	Individual time trial	Marco Pinotti (ITA)

== Classification leadership ==
In the 2012 Giro d'Italia, four different jerseys were awarded. For the general classification, calculated by adding each cyclist's finishing times on each stage, and allowing time bonuses for the first three finishers on mass-start stages, the leader received a pink jersey. This classification was considered the most important of the Giro d'Italia, and the winner was considered the winner of the Giro.

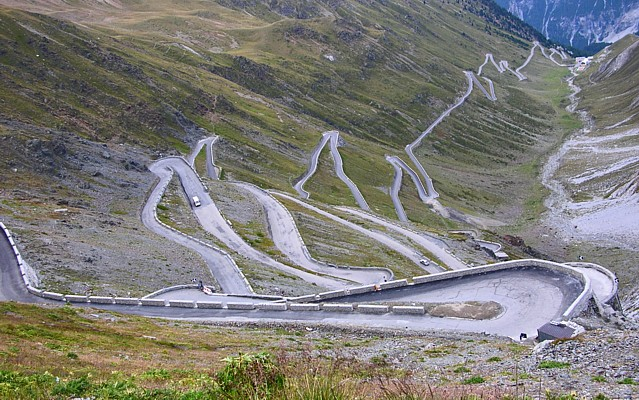
Some of the 48 hairpin turns near the top of the eastern ramp of the Stelvio Pass

Additionally, there was a points classification, which awarded a red jersey. In the points classification, cyclists got points for finishing in the top 15 in a stage. Unlike in the better known points classification in the Tour de France, the type of stage had no effect on what points were on offer – each stage had the same points available on the same scale. The win earned 25 points, second place earned 20 points, third 16, fourth 14, fifth 12, sixth 10, and one point fewer per place down to a single point for 15th. In addition, points could be won in intermediate sprints.

There was also a mountains classification, the leadership of which was marked by a blue jersey. The jersey had been green since the jersey was first awarded, but with a sponsorship change, the jersey color was changed to blue. In the mountains classifications, points were won by reaching the top of a climb before other cyclists. Each climb was categorized as either first, second, third, or fourth-category, with more points available for the higher-categorized climbs. The Cima Coppi, the race's highest point of elevation, awarded still more points than the other first-category climbs. The Cima Coppi for the 2012 Giro d'Italia was the Stelvio Pass. The first rider to cross the Stelvio was Thomas De Gendt.

The fourth jersey represented the young rider classification, marked by a white jersey. This was decided the same way as the general classification, but only riders born after 1 January 1987 were eligible.

There were also two classifications for teams. In the Trofeo Fast Team classification, the times of the best three cyclists per team on each stage were added; the leading team was the team with the lowest total time; the Trofeo Super Team was a team points classification, with the top 20 placed riders on each stage earning points (20 for first place, 19 for second place and so on, down to a single point for 20th) for their team.

The rows in the following table correspond to the jerseys awarded after that stage was run.

Stage	Winner	General classification	Points classification	Mountains classification	Young rider classification	Trofeo Fast Team	Trofeo Super Team
1	Taylor Phinney	Taylor Phinney	Taylor Phinney	not awarded	Taylor Phinney	Garmin–Barracuda	Garmin–Barracuda
2	Mark Cavendish	Taylor Phinney	Mark Cavendish	Alfredo Balloni	Taylor Phinney	Garmin–Barracuda	Garmin–Barracuda
3	Matthew Goss	Taylor Phinney	Matthew Goss	Alfredo Balloni	Taylor Phinney	Garmin–Barracuda	Garmin–Barracuda
4	Garmin–Barracuda	Ramūnas Navardauskas	Matthew Goss	Alfredo Balloni	Ramūnas Navardauskas	Garmin–Barracuda	Garmin–Barracuda
5	Mark Cavendish	Ramūnas Navardauskas	Matthew Goss	Alfredo Balloni	Ramūnas Navardauskas	Garmin–Barracuda	Garmin–Barracuda
6	Miguel Ángel Rubiano	Adriano Malori	Matthew Goss	Miguel Ángel Rubiano	Adriano Malori	Garmin–Barracuda	Garmin–Barracuda
7	Paolo Tiralongo	Ryder Hesjedal	Matthew Goss	Miguel Ángel Rubiano	Peter Stetina	Garmin–Barracuda	Garmin–Barracuda
8	Domenico Pozzovivo	Ryder Hesjedal	Matthew Goss	Miguel Ángel Rubiano	Damiano Caruso	Liquigas–Cannondale	Garmin–Barracuda
9	Francisco Ventoso	Ryder Hesjedal	Matthew Goss	Miguel Ángel Rubiano	Damiano Caruso	Liquigas–Cannondale	Garmin–Barracuda
10	Joaquim Rodríguez	Joaquim Rodríguez	Matthew Goss	Miguel Ángel Rubiano	Damiano Caruso	Liquigas–Cannondale	Garmin–Barracuda
11	Roberto Ferrari	Joaquim Rodríguez	Mark Cavendish	Miguel Ángel Rubiano	Damiano Caruso	Liquigas–Cannondale	Garmin–Barracuda
12	Lars Bak	Joaquim Rodríguez	Mark Cavendish	Michał Gołaś	Damiano Caruso	Movistar Team	Garmin–Barracuda
13	Mark Cavendish	Joaquim Rodríguez	Mark Cavendish	Michał Gołaś	Damiano Caruso	Movistar Team	Garmin–Barracuda
14	Andrey Amador	Ryder Hesjedal	Mark Cavendish	Michał Gołaś	Rigoberto Urán	Movistar Team	Garmin–Barracuda
15	Matteo Rabottini	Joaquim Rodríguez	Mark Cavendish	Matteo Rabottini	Sergio Henao	Movistar Team	Garmin–Barracuda
16	Jon Izagirre	Joaquim Rodríguez	Mark Cavendish	Matteo Rabottini	Sergio Henao	Movistar Team	Garmin–Barracuda
17	Joaquim Rodríguez	Joaquim Rodríguez	Mark Cavendish	Matteo Rabottini	Rigoberto Urán	Movistar Team	Garmin–Barracuda
18	Andrea Guardini	Joaquim Rodríguez	Mark Cavendish	Matteo Rabottini	Rigoberto Urán	Movistar Team	Garmin–Barracuda
19	Roman Kreuziger	Joaquim Rodríguez	Mark Cavendish	Matteo Rabottini	Rigoberto Urán	Movistar Team	Garmin–Barracuda
20	Thomas De Gendt	Joaquim Rodríguez	Joaquim Rodríguez	Matteo Rabottini	Rigoberto Urán	Lampre–ISD	Garmin–Barracuda
21	Marco Pinotti	Ryder Hesjedal	Joaquim Rodríguez	Matteo Rabottini	Rigoberto Urán	Lampre–ISD	Garmin–Barracuda
Final		Ryder Hesjedal	Joaquim Rodríguez	Matteo Rabottini	Rigoberto Urán	Lampre–ISD	Garmin–Barracuda

== Final standings ==
Legend
A pink jersey	Denotes the winner of the General classification	A green jersey	Denotes the winner of the Mountains classification
A red jersey	Denotes the winner of the Points classification	A white jersey	Denotes the winner of the Young rider classification

=== General classification ===
	Rider	Team	Time
1	Ryder Hesjedal (CAN)	Garmin–Barracuda	91h 39' 02"
2	Joaquim Rodríguez (ESP)	Team Katusha	+ 16"
3	Thomas De Gendt (BEL)	Vacansoleil–DCM	+ 1' 39"
4	Michele Scarponi (ITA)	Lampre–ISD	+ 2' 05"
5	Ivan Basso (ITA)	Liquigas–Cannondale	+ 3' 44"
6	Damiano Cunego (ITA)	Lampre–ISD	+ 4' 40"
7	Rigoberto Urán (COL)	Team Sky	+ 5' 57"
8	Domenico Pozzovivo (ITA)	Colnago–CSF Bardiani	+ 6' 28"
9	Sergio Henao (COL)	Team Sky	+ 7' 50"
10	Mikel Nieve (ESP)	Euskaltel–Euskadi	+ 8' 08"

=== Points classification ===
	Rider	Team	Points
1	Joaquim Rodríguez (ESP)	Team Katusha	139
2	Mark Cavendish (GBR)	Team Sky	138
3	Ryder Hesjedal (CAN)	Garmin–Barracuda	113
4	Michele Scarponi (ITA)	Lampre–ISD	81
5	Domenico Pozzovivo (ITA)	Colnago–CSF Bardiani	80
6	Thomas De Gendt (BEL)	Vacansoleil–DCM	76
7	Ivan Basso (ITA)	Liquigas–Cannondale	58
8	Alexander Kristoff (NOR)	Team Katusha	58
9	Geraint Thomas (GBR)	Team Sky	53
10	Andrey Amador (CRC)	Movistar Team	52

=== Mountains classification ===
	Rider	Team	Points
1	Matteo Rabottini (ITA)	Farnese Vini–Selle Italia	84
2	Stefano Pirazzi (ITA)	Colnago–CSF Bardiani	44
3	Andrey Amador (CRC)	Movistar Team	43
4	Michał Gołaś (POL)	Omega Pharma–Quick-Step	34
5	Domenico Pozzovivo (ITA)	Colnago–CSF Bardiani	26
6	Jan Bárta (CZE)	Team NetApp	24
7	Miguel Ángel Rubiano (COL)	Androni Giocattoli–Venezuela	24
8	Ryder Hesjedal (CAN)	Garmin–Barracuda	24
9	Joaquim Rodríguez (ESP)	Team Katusha	23
10	Thomas De Gendt (BEL)	Vacansoleil–DCM	21

=== Young riders classification ===
	Rider	Team	Time
1	Rigoberto Urán (COL)	Team Sky	91h 44′ 59″
2	Sergio Henao (COL)	Team Sky	+ 1' 53″
3	Gianluca Brambilla (ITA)	Colnago–CSF Bardiani	+ 8' 23″
4	Diego Ulissi (ITA)	Lampre–ISD	+ 31' 20″
5	Damiano Caruso (ITA)	Liquigas–Cannondale	+ 43' 48″
6	Tanel Kangert (EST)	Astana	+ 44' 52″
7	Peter Stetina (USA)	Garmin–Barracuda	+ 48' 28″
8	Tom-Jelte Slagter (NED)	Rabobank	+ 51' 27″
9	Stefano Pirazzi (ITA)	Colnago–CSF Bardiani	+ 1h 35' 00″
10	Jon Izagirre (ESP)	Euskaltel–Euskadi	+ 1h 42' 57″

=== Trofeo Fast Team classification ===
	Team	Time
1	(Italy) Lampre–ISD	274h 19′ 46″
2	(Spain) Movistar Team	+ 10' 53″
3	(United Kingdom) Team Sky	+ 37' 07″
4	(Kazakhstan) Astana	+ 43' 12″
5	(United States) Garmin–Barracuda	+ 51' 52"
6	(Italy) Liquigas–Cannondale	+ 54' 09″
7	(Spain) Euskaltel–Euskadi	+ 56' 27″
8	(Republic of Ireland) Colnago–CSF Bardiani	+ 1h 10' 25″
9	(France) Ag2r–La Mondiale	+ 1h 22' 12″
10	(Russia) Team Katusha	+ 1h 30' 51″

=== Trofeo Super Team classification ===
	Team	Points
1	(United States) Garmin–Barracuda	363
2	(United Kingdom) Team Sky	345
3	(Russia) Team Katusha	301
4	(Republic of Ireland) Colnago–CSF Bardiani	253
5	(Belgium) Omega Pharma–Quick-Step	244
6	(Spain) Movistar Team	239
7	(Luxembourg) RadioShack–Nissan	234
8	(Italy) Liquigas–Cannondale	221
9	(Australia) Orica–GreenEDGE	212
10	(France) FDJ–BigMat	197
