= 2012 Giro d'Italia, Stage 1 to Stage 11 =

Cycling race stages

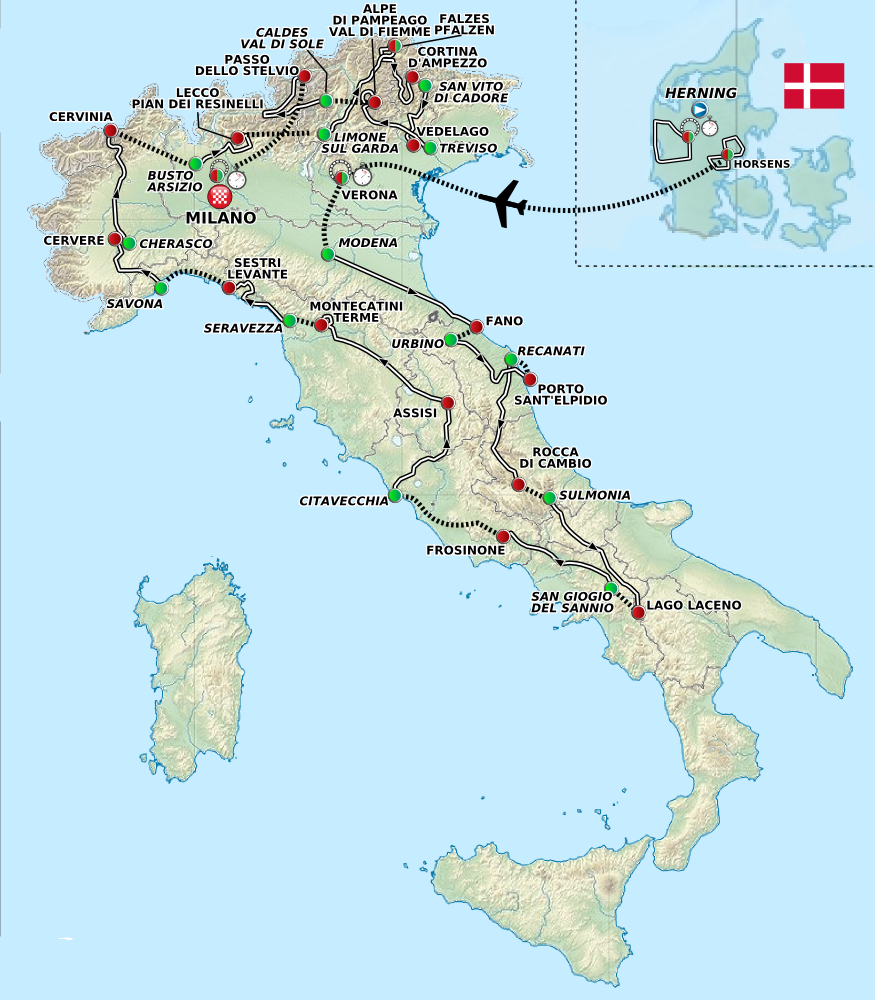
Overview of the stages; purple lines represent distances covered in the individual stages, while black dotted lines are the distances covered in transfers between the stages.

The 2012 Giro d'Italia began on 5 May, and stage 11 occurred on 16 May. The 2012 edition began with an individual time trial stage – where each member of the starting peloton of 198 riders competed against the clock – in Herning, Denmark with two more stages held in the country before an early rest day. The riders then travelled by air to Italy, with the race resuming in Verona and a team time trial, an event where each member of a team started together racing against the clock.

Taylor Phinney held the lead of the race throughout its opening Danish leg; having won the race-commencing individual time trial, Phinney defended it on the following two stages, despite crashing in the closing stages of the third stage after being involved in a multi-rider incident. Phinney crossed the line in an ambulance, receiving medical attention before making his way onto the rostrum. The incident itself was started by Roberto Ferrari clipping Mark Cavendish – the winner of the second stage – causing Cavendish to fall and the rest of the field to stack up behind. Race organisers saw fit to demote Ferrari on the stage results, penalise him on both time – 30 seconds penalty on the general classification – and a 25-point deduction, while he was fined also. Ferrari was remorseful at the time of the crash, but later apologised to Cavendish and other riders involved.

Upon the race's return to Italy, Garmin–Barracuda won the fourth stage, the team time trial in Verona. Alex Rasmussen had been placed third after the Danish leg, but he was dropped during the stage and thus it was Ramūnas Navardauskas who picked up the maglia rosa from Phinney, becoming the first rider from Lithuania to wear the leader's jersey at the Giro. Navardauskas held on to the jersey for another day, before Adriano Malori assumed the lead of the race at the end of stage six. Malori had been a part of the breakaway on that stage, before Miguel Ángel Rubiano soloed to victory on the day. The jersey changed hands again the following day, as Malori cracked during the seventh stage, with Ryder Hesjedal coming through to become the first Canadian to wear the pink jersey. He held the jersey for three days, before handing it over to Joaquim Rodríguez, who took the jersey with a win on the tenth stage, a steep finish into Assisi. Rodríguez held on to the jersey the next day, topping the overall standings with the more mountainous second half of the Giro still to race.

Legend (Note: Jerseys appearing in the table on the left of the page indicate those worn by the cyclist during the particular stage, while those appearing in the table on the right of the page indicate those awarded to the cyclist after the stage.)
A pink jersey	Denotes the leader of the General classification	A blue jersey	Denotes the leader of the Mountains classification
A red jersey	Denotes the leader of the Points classification	A white jersey	Denotes the leader of the Young rider classification
	s.t. indicates that the rider crossed the finish line in the same group as the one receiving the time above him, and was therefore credited with the same finishing time.		

== Stage 1 ==
5 May 2012 — Herning (Denmark), 8.7 km (5.4 mi), individual time trial (ITT)

The race commenced with a short individual time trial stage, much like it had done on the Giro's previous start in a foreign country – the start in Herning was the tenth time that the race had started outside of Italy, and the furthest north geographically – when the race began with an individual time trial of 8.4 km (5.2 mi) held in Amsterdam, Netherlands in 2010. The stage in Herning itself, 8.7 km (5.4 mi) in length, was relatively flat, dropping only 8 metres (26 ft) in altitude from the start, to the end. Despite this, it was considered technical due to the nature of the parcours, with several tight ninety-degree turns and cobblestones on several sections of the course before the finish at H. P. Hansensvej. Jackson Rodríguez (Androni Giocattoli–Venezuela) was the first rider to depart the start house in Herning, recording a time of 11' 58" for the course, a time that was eventually only good enough for the bottom ten places overall.

Indeed, Rodríguez's lead was short-lived as Marco Bandiera (Omega Pharma–Quick-Step), Team Saxo Bank's Jonas Aaen Jørgensen and Team Sky rider Bernhard Eisel all assumed the top spot as they reached the finish, with Robert Hunter of Garmin–Barracuda recording the first time under eleven minutes, as he set a time of 10' 54". Hunter's time held to the next group of riders and it was his team-mate Ramūnas Navardauskas that took the lead; Navardauskas recorded a time some six seconds faster, and was good enough to hold off the rest of the field for over two hours. Navardauskas' time was given a few close calls; RadioShack–Nissan's Jesse Sergent went quicker at the start of the stage – four seconds ahead of Navardauskas to the mid-stage intermediate point – but ultimately faded to two seconds outside of the Lithuanian rider's time. A while later, Brett Lancaster went even closer to the time of Navardauskas for the newly renamed Orica–GreenEDGE team; he was quicker to the intermediate point than what Sergent had been, but fell outside the time by just one second at the stage finish, having encountered his minute-man Andrey Zeits (Astana) in the closing stages.

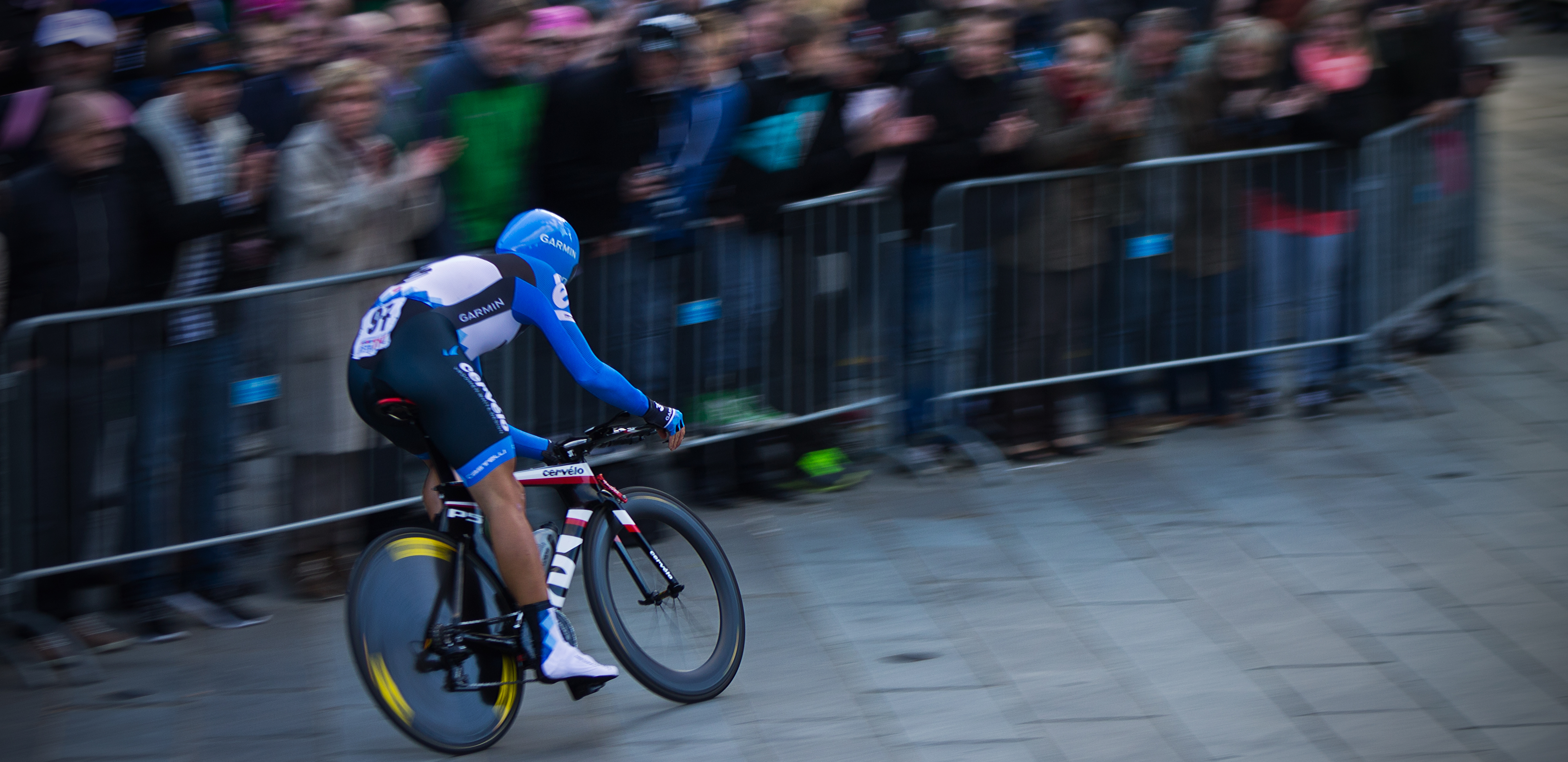
Alex Rasmussen (Garmin–Barracuda) was the highest-placed Danish rider in the opening stage, placing third behind Taylor Phinney and Geraint Thomas.

Navardauskas' stay at the head of the stage classification was eventually ended by Team Saxo Bank's Manuele Boaro, who had placed in the top ten in individual time trials of both Tirreno–Adriatico and the Tour de Romandie, having set the quickest time to the intermediate point and eventually continued the pace to the end of the stage, recording a time of 10' 41". Geraint Thomas was next to the line for Team Sky, and went six seconds below the time of Boaro, but both were eventually eclipsed by BMC Racing Team's Taylor Phinney, the 2010 world under-23 time trial champion. Thomas had held the advantage at midpoint by one second, but an impressive second half of the course turned a deficit into an eventual stage-winning margin of nine seconds. Thus Phinney, who later stated that it had been a dream to win the jersey, became only the third American rider to wear the leader's maglia rosa after Andrew Hampsten in 1988 and Christian Vande Velde in 2008. Phinney and Thomas were safe from further challenges, but Alex Rasmussen (Garmin–Barracuda) and Vacansoleil–DCM's Gustav Larsson both broke into the top five later on, recording times of 10' 39" and 10' 48" respectively. Further back, Astana's Roman Kreuziger recorded the best time of the overall contenders, with a time of 11' 02" good enough for 28th position in the stage results. Ivan Basso (Liquigas–Cannondale) and Joaquim Rodríguez (Team Katusha) set times within ten seconds of Kreuziger in their disadvantageous discipline; although they both gained a 20-second advantage over Lampre–ISD pair Damiano Cunego and Michele Scarponi.

Stage 1 result and general classification after stage 1

	Rider	Team	Time
1	Taylor Phinney (USA)	BMC Racing Team	10' 26"
2	Geraint Thomas (GBR)	Team Sky	+ 9"
3	Alex Rasmussen (DEN)	Garmin–Barracuda	+ 13"
4	Manuele Boaro (ITA)	Team Saxo Bank	+ 15"
5	Gustav Larsson (SWE)	Vacansoleil–DCM	+ 22"
6	Ramūnas Navardauskas (LTU)	Garmin–Barracuda	+ 22"
7	Brett Lancaster (AUS)	Orica–GreenEDGE	+ 23"
8	Marco Pinotti (ITA)	BMC Racing Team	+ 24"
9	Jesse Sergent (NZL)	RadioShack–Nissan	+ 26"
10	Nelson Oliveira (POR)	RadioShack–Nissan	+ 27"

== Stage 2 ==
6 May 2012 — Herning (Denmark) to Herning (Denmark), 206 km (128.0 mi)

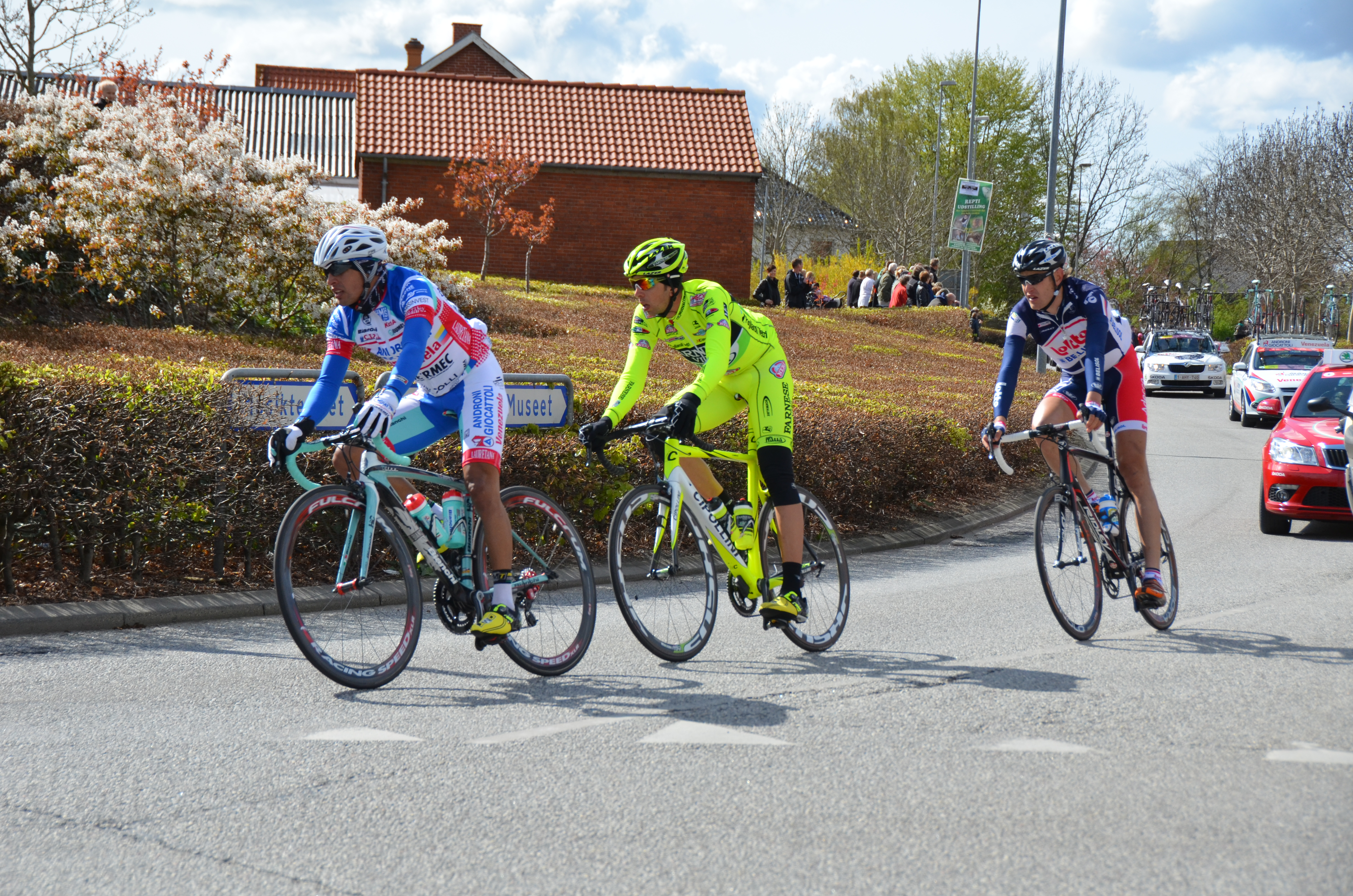
The day's breakaway in Holstebro; Miguel Ángel Rubiano leads Alfredo Balloni and Olivier Kaisen.

Three riders – Farnese Vini–Selle Italia's Alfredo Balloni, Olivier Kaisen of Lotto–Belisol, and Androni Giocattoli–Venezuela rider Miguel Ángel Rubiano – advanced clear of the main field in the early running of the stage; the quartet managed to extend their advantage to a maximum of over thirteen minutes around a quarter of the way through the stage. With all the riders close together time-wise following the opening stage, Team Sky and BMC Racing Team were mainstays at the front of the peloton, trying to chip away at the advantage of the breakaway throughout the twisting Danish roads alongside the coast. Orica–GreenEDGE were also prominent towards the front of the main pack, as they looked to protect their main sprinter Matthew Goss. In the breakaway, Balloni guaranteed himself as the recipient of the first maglia azzurra of the race, as he crested the day's only categorised climb in Østerbjerg first, ahead of Rubiano and Kaisen.

The lead advantage at this point – with around 90 km (55.9 mi) remaining – had been cut to less than half of what it had been before; Team Sky's pace on the front allowed the gap to fall to just over five minutes on the route. With other teams coming towards the front of the main pack, namely Liquigas–Cannondale and Lampre–ISD, the advantage that the trio out front held, continued to dwindle. It was inevitable that the trio would be caught, and sure enough, just shy of the 40 km (24.9 mi) to go banner, the peloton absorbed the breakaway back into their midsts. Parity however was short-lived as an attacking move was launched by Kaisen's team-mate Lars Bak, the Danish rider giving home fans someone to cheer for; he was given space for a time by the main field, allowing to get clear by around 45 seconds as they reached the 30 km (18.6 mi) remaining mark. He stayed off the front for a time longer, and was caught with around 17 km (10.6 mi) to go; Astana and Rabobank having done most of the legwork to bring him back, after the other teams had only brought Bak back marginally.

The riders remained together as they entered Herning for the final finishing loop of 12.5 km (7.8 mi) in and around the city, with no riders being allowed any initiative to get a gap on the field, and thus limiting the chances of somebody getting clear in the closing stages. The lap had been passing without drama, until race leader Taylor Phinney (BMC Racing Team) crashed a third of the way around the lap. Once he got back onto his feet, Phinney suffered the misfortune of dropping his chain and lost over 30 seconds trying to fix the issue, but with help from his team-mates, including Danilo Wyss and Alessandro Ballan, he managed to bridge back up to the main pack ahead of the finish. At the front, Garmin–Barracuda were starting to set up their leadout train for Tyler Farrar while Farnese Vini–Selle Italia had hoped to get Andrea Guardini, the six-stage winner at the Tour de Langkawi earlier in the season, in position for the sprint. As the field rounded the final corner, Rabobank's Theo Bos lost control – having clipped the wheel of team-mate Mark Renshaw – and crashed into Alexander Kristoff (Team Katusha), and caused a stack-up which reduced the number of contenders for the stage win; Garmin–Barracuda's train was still in position at the front, but Geraint Thomas delivered Mark Cavendish to the line for the incumbent world champion to claim his 31st Grand Tour stage win on the line, ahead of Goss and FDJ–BigMat's Geoffrey Soupe. Phinney held the leader's jersey after finishing within the main field, while Cavendish took the lead of the points classification from Phinney.

Stage 2 result

	Rider	Team	Time
1	Mark Cavendish (GBR)	Team Sky	4h 53' 12"
2	Matthew Goss (AUS)	Orica–GreenEDGE	s.t.
3	Geoffrey Soupe (FRA)	FDJ–BigMat	s.t.
4	Tyler Farrar (USA)	Garmin–Barracuda	s.t.
5	Roberto Ferrari (ITA)	Androni Giocattoli–Venezuela	s.t.
6	Mark Renshaw (AUS)	Rabobank	s.t.
7	Thor Hushovd (NOR)	BMC Racing Team	s.t.
8	Daniele Bennati (ITA)	RadioShack–Nissan	s.t.
9	William Bonnet (FRA)	FDJ–BigMat	s.t.
10	Geraint Thomas (GBR)	Team Sky	s.t.

General classification after stage 2

	Rider	Team	Time
1	Taylor Phinney (USA)	BMC Racing Team	5h 03' 38"
2	Geraint Thomas (GBR)	Team Sky	+ 9"
3	Alex Rasmussen (DEN)	Garmin–Barracuda	+ 13"
4	Manuele Boaro (ITA)	Team Saxo Bank	+ 15"
5	Gustav Larsson (SWE)	Vacansoleil–DCM	+ 22"
6	Ramūnas Navardauskas (LTU)	Garmin–Barracuda	+ 22"
7	Brett Lancaster (AUS)	Orica–GreenEDGE	+ 23"
8	Marco Pinotti (ITA)	BMC Racing Team	+ 24"
9	Jesse Sergent (NZL)	RadioShack–Nissan	+ 26"
10	Nelson Oliveira (POR)	RadioShack–Nissan	+ 27"

== Stage 3 ==
7 May 2012 — Horsens (Denmark) to Horsens (Denmark), 190 km (118.1 mi)

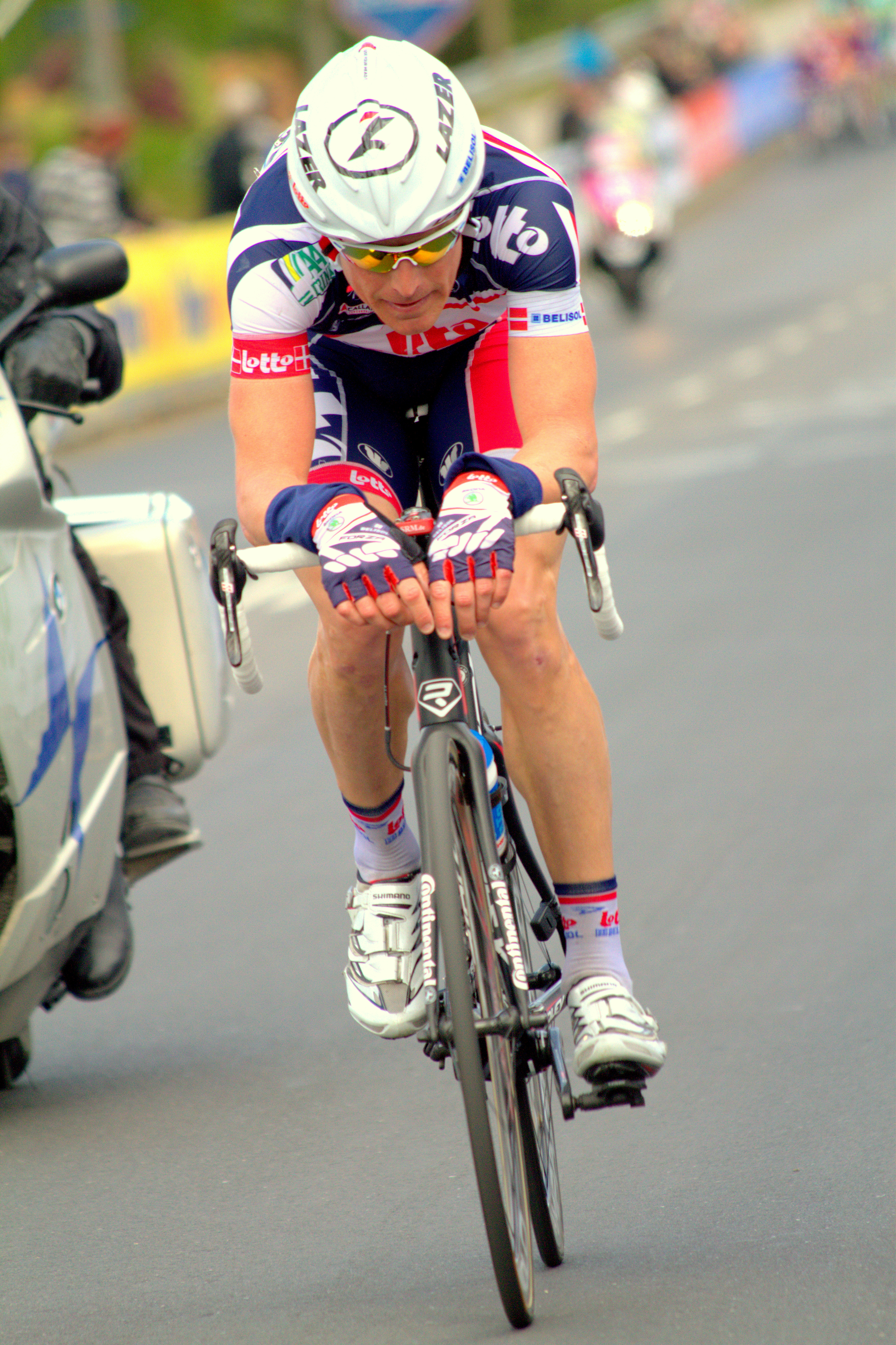
Lotto–Belisol's Lars Bak counter-attacked the field for the second consecutive day, during the third stage – following the end of the breakaway – but failed to achieve a suitable gap over the peloton and was caught before the end.

The third stage of the race was dedicated to Belgian rider Wouter Weylandt – the winner of the third stage of the 2010 edition of the race into Middelburg, Netherlands – after he crashed while descending the Passo del Bocco during the third stage of the 2011 race, and died of his injuries in the crash. A short ceremony, including a minute's silence led by RadioShack–Nissan team members – Weylandt's former Leopard Trek team – was held prior to the stage in Horsens. As well as Weylandt, the mayor of Horsens, Jan Trøjborg, was also commemorated during the ceremony. Trøjborg, who had been a prevalent figure in bringing the Giro to Denmark, died on 6 May after suffering a heart attack during an amateur bicycle ride in Jutland.

Six riders made up the stage's breakaway, including sixth-placed Ramūnas Navardauskas (Garmin–Barracuda), but they could not gather more than three-and-a-half minutes of an advantage throughout the entire parcours, and were all caught by around 25 km (15.5 mi) remaining. As he had done the previous day, Lotto–Belisol's Lars Bak counter-attacked the peloton as they caught the leaders, but he was caught on the final lap of a finishing circuit 14.3 km (8.9 mi) in length, and thus setting up for an eventual bunch sprint to the finish line. Team Sky and Team Saxo Bank were towards the front although Geraint Thomas later sat up as Mark Cavendish was not directly behind him, and in effect leaving him without a lead-out man. Orica–GreenEDGE brought their men forward inside the final kilometre; with Tomas Vaitkus and Brett Lancaster setting the pace for Matthew Goss, they moved to the head of the pack. Cavendish picked up the wheel of Garmin–Barracuda's Tyler Farrar and they attacked down the outside of the road, moving forward at around 200 m (660 ft) remaining.

Androni Giocattoli–Venezuela rider Roberto Ferrari tried to move from the left side of the road to the right side of it, but as he aggressively switched lanes, he clipped Cavendish, sending the world champion to the ground and causing the whole field to stack up behind. Among other riders to fall were overall leader Taylor Phinney (BMC Racing Team) and Colnago–CSF Bardiani sprinter Sacha Modolo. In front of the chaos, Goss led out the sprint to take Orica–GreenEDGE's first Grand Tour win, and with the bonus seconds on offer at the finish, moved into the top ten overall, as well as taking the points classification lead from Cavendish; Team Saxo Bank rider Juan José Haedo finished second ahead of Farrar. Ferrari, who had finished the stage ninth, was demoted to the end of the stage results, fined, and was penalised 30 seconds in the general classification and 25 points in the points classification; a decision that his team boss Gianni Savio had no qualms about, although Ferrari was remorseless when reflecting about his actions. Cavendish later tweeted that Ferrari should be "ashamed to take out Pink, Red & World Champ jerseys", and also questioned the decision to keep Ferrari in the race.

Stage 3 result

	Rider	Team	Time
1	Matthew Goss (AUS)	Orica–GreenEDGE	4h 20' 53"
2	Juan José Haedo (ARG)	Team Saxo Bank	s.t.
3	Tyler Farrar (USA)	Garmin–Barracuda	s.t.
4	Arnaud Démare (FRA)	FDJ–BigMat	s.t.
5	Mark Renshaw (AUS)	Rabobank	s.t.
6	Thor Hushovd (NOR)	BMC Racing Team	s.t.
7	Alexander Kristoff (NOR)	Team Katusha	s.t.
8	Romain Feillu (FRA)	Vacansoleil–DCM	s.t.
9	Fumiyuki Beppu (JPN)	Orica–GreenEDGE	s.t.
10	Andrea Guardini (ITA)	Farnese Vini–Selle Italia	s.t.

General classification after stage 3

	Rider	Team	Time
1	Taylor Phinney (USA)	BMC Racing Team	9h 24' 31"
2	Geraint Thomas (GBR)	Team Sky	+ 9"
3	Alex Rasmussen (DEN)	Garmin–Barracuda	+ 13"
4	Manuele Boaro (ITA)	Team Saxo Bank	+ 15"
5	Ramūnas Navardauskas (LTU)	Garmin–Barracuda	+ 18"
6	Gustav Larsson (SWE)	Vacansoleil–DCM	+ 22"
7	Brett Lancaster (AUS)	Orica–GreenEDGE	+ 23"
8	Matthew Goss (AUS)	Orica–GreenEDGE	+ 23"
9	Marco Pinotti (ITA)	BMC Racing Team	+ 24"
10	Jesse Sergent (NZL)	RadioShack–Nissan	+ 26"

== Stage 4 ==
9 May 2012 — Verona, 33.2 km (20.6 mi), team time trial (TTT)

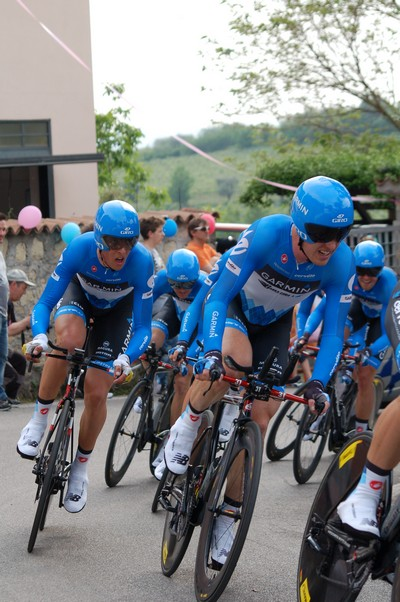
Members of the Garmin–Barracuda team during the stage. Their stage-winning performance ultimately allowed Ramūnas Navardauskas to become the first Lithuanian rider to wear the leader's pink jersey.

For the seventh successive year, the Giro's first stage on Italian soil was held as a time trial; on this occasion it was held in and around Verona, on a 33.2 km (20.6 mi) circuit. The circuit started at the Basilica di San Zeno, heading out towards the comune of San Pietro in Cariano, around 10 km (6.2 mi) outside of Verona before returning to Verona itself, finishing on the city's largest piazza, the Piazza Bra. Much like individual time trial stages, each of the squads set off in reverse order from where they were ranked in the teams general classification at the end of the previous stage, with the exception of BMC Racing Team – second in the standings – who started after the classification leaders Garmin–Barracuda, as Taylor Phinney held the lead of the race overall for BMC Racing Team. Thus, Ag2r–La Mondiale, who were bottom of the classification, trailing Garmin–Barracuda by two minutes and eighteen seconds, were the first team to set off on the stage. Ag2r–La Mondiale set a time of 38' 49" for the course, with only Euskaltel–Euskadi – starting three minutes later – recording a slower time overall.

Androni Giocattoli–Venezuela knocked a second off the time of Ag2r–La Mondiale to take a short spell at the top of the timesheets, before Lampre–ISD comfortably bettered their time, by over a minute, with Italian national champion Adriano Malori helping to drive the pace on the front of the squad's train, with their overall contenders Michele Scarponi and Damiano Cunego in tow. Their time held until the ninth squad to start the stage, Joaquim Rodríguez's Team Katusha, took another half minute off the best time of Lampre–ISD, recording a time of 37' 09", to aid with Rodríguez's placing in the general classification – moving into the top ten placings – overall. The team's time held until the second team from the end, Garmin–Barracuda went round the course five seconds quicker, for their second team time trial win of the year after a victory in the Tour of Qatar; the result, and the squad's teamwork, pleased sporting director Allan Peiper at the conclusion of the stage. Phinney's stay in the maglia rosa was ended, as BMC Racing Team finished the stage in a time 31 seconds outside that of Garmin–Barracuda; assuming the lead of the race was Ramūnas Navardauskas, after the team's highest-placed rider prior to the stage, Alex Rasmussen, was dropped during the stage. Phinney later suggested that his crashes of previous days may have been a contributing factor in the loss of the leader's jersey.

Stage 4 result

	Team	Time
1	Garmin–Barracuda	37' 04"
2	Team Katusha	+ 5"
3	Astana	+ 22"
4	Team Saxo Bank	+ 22"
5	Omega Pharma–Quick-Step	+ 24"
6	Orica–GreenEDGE	+ 25"
7	Liquigas–Cannondale	+ 26"
8	RadioShack–Nissan	+ 28"
9	Team Sky	+ 30"
10	BMC Racing Team	+ 31"

General classification after stage 4

	Rider	Team	Time
1	Ramūnas Navardauskas (LTU)	Garmin–Barracuda	10h 01' 53"
2	Tyler Farrar (USA)	Garmin–Barracuda	+ 10"
3	Robert Hunter (RSA)	Garmin–Barracuda	+ 10"
4	Ryder Hesjedal (CAN)	Garmin–Barracuda	+ 11"
5	Taylor Phinney (USA)	BMC Racing Team	+ 13"
6	Manuele Boaro (ITA)	Team Saxo Bank	+ 19"
7	Geraint Thomas (GBR)	Team Sky	+ 21"
8	Sébastien Rosseler (BEL)	Garmin–Barracuda	+ 25"
9	Christian Vande Velde (USA)	Garmin–Barracuda	+ 26"
10	Joaquim Rodríguez (ESP)	Team Katusha	+ 30"

== Stage 5 ==
10 May 2012 — Modena to Fano, 209 km (129.9 mi)

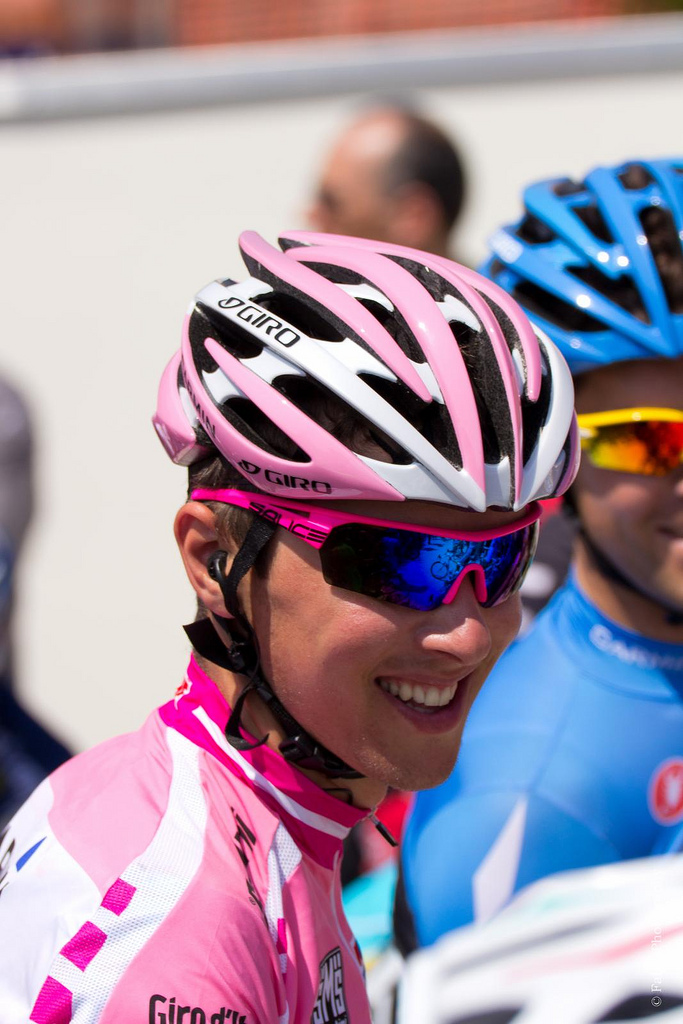
Ramūnas Navardauskas at the start of the stage in Modena. Navardauskas maintained his overall lead, but his advantage was reduced to five seconds by Garmin–Barracuda team-mate Robert Hunter.

Following the route of the Via Aemilia Roman road, Pierpaolo De Negri of Farnese Vini–Selle Italia instigated the breakaway of the day, and was joined shortly after by several other riders, with Lotto–Belisol pairing Olivier Kaisen – who had been a part of the second stage breakaway – and Brian Bulgaç, and Androni Giocattoli–Venezuela rider Alessandro De Marchi joining De Negri out front. The quartet quickly stepped up the pace to pull clear of the peloton, fronted by the Garmin–Barracuda team of race leader Ramūnas Navardauskas. After leaving Forlì, approaching the midpoint of the stage, the breakaway's lead was over six minutes. Garmin–Barracuda then set about reducing their advantage steadily, with proficient time-trial riders Alex Rasmussen and Sébastien Rosseler controlling the tempo on the front of the main field as they headed ever nearer the finish point; FDJ–BigMat also had riders towards the front, in the hope of setting up their sprinter Arnaud Démare for the finish in Fano. Team Katusha then drove the pace of the peloton – reducing their advantage to 2' 30" – as the leaders hit the foot of the day's only categorised climb, the fourth-category Gabicce Monte where De Negri led across the summit, and Kaisen was dropped on the climb. The main field had reduced their advantage to half of what it was at the bottom of the climb.

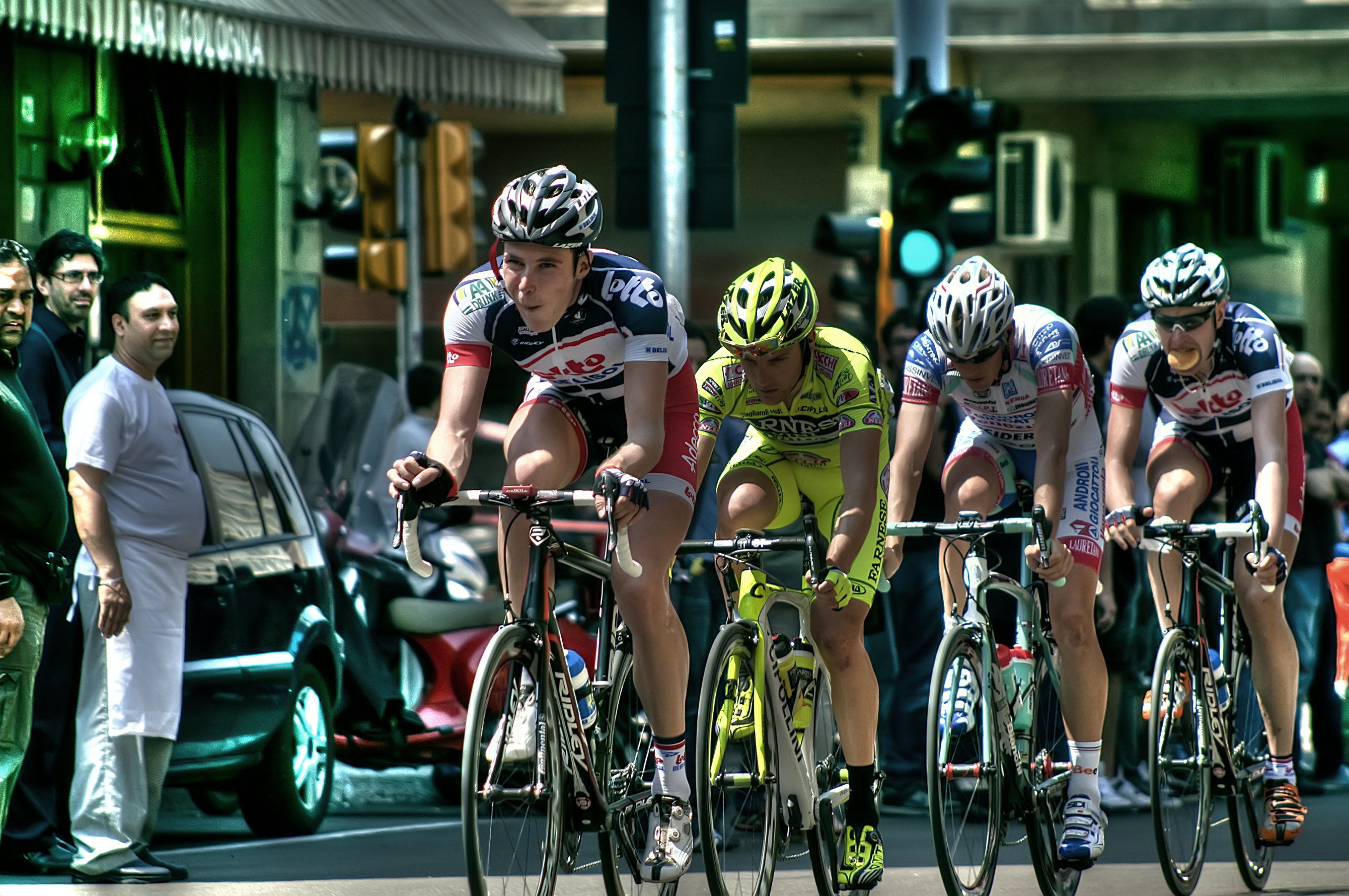
The day's breakaway in Bologna. Brian Bulgaç leads Pierpaolo De Negri, Alessandro De Marchi and Olivier Kaisen.

De Marchi attacked not long after the summit of the climb, maintaining a lead of around a minute ahead of the peloton now led by Liquigas–Cannondale, who were looking to keep two-time Giro winner Ivan Basso out of trouble, unlike BMC Racing Team's Taylor Phinney, who encountered a crash for the fourth stage in succession. De Negri and Bulgaç were pulled back by the main field not long after the climb, while De Marchi managed to hold off the front until around 20 km (12.4 mi) from the end. Within that distance, there were several mini-attacks by the likes of former Italian national champion Giovanni Visconti (Movistar Team) and another Lotto–Belisol rider, Adam Hansen, but it all came down to the final sprint for the line. The sprint itself came down to two teams; Orica–GreenEDGE, the team of points classification leader Matthew Goss, and Team Sky, with world champion – and Goss' former team-mate – Mark Cavendish looking to pick up his second win of the Giro. As he had done on stage 2, Geraint Thomas led Cavendish out for the sprint with around 200 m (660 ft) to go and despite Goss' best attempts, Cavendish prevailed ahead of Goss, while Daniele Bennati (RadioShack–Nissan) beat out Robert Hunter (Garmin–Barracuda) for third place. With a split in the peloton – resulting in a five-second gap – Hunter missed out on the maglia rosa by five seconds, and the jersey remained with Navardauskas. Goss and Cavendish – who was joined on the podium by his new-born daughter Delilah Grace – both moved into the top five overall with the bonus seconds on offer at the finish.

Stage 5 result

	Rider	Team	Time
1	Mark Cavendish (GBR)	Team Sky	4h 43' 15"
2	Matthew Goss (AUS)	Orica–GreenEDGE	s.t.
3	Daniele Bennati (ITA)	RadioShack–Nissan	s.t.
4	Robert Hunter (RSA)	Garmin–Barracuda	s.t.
5	Sacha Modolo (ITA)	Colnago–CSF Bardiani	s.t.
6	Alexander Kristoff (NOR)	Team Katusha	s.t.
7	Elia Favilli (ITA)	Farnese Vini–Selle Italia	s.t.
8	Manuel Belletti (ITA)	Ag2r–La Mondiale	s.t.
9	Arnaud Démare (FRA)	FDJ–BigMat	s.t.
10	Jonas Aaen Jørgensen (DEN)	Team Saxo Bank	s.t.

General classification after stage 5

	Rider	Team	Time
1	Ramūnas Navardauskas (LTU)	Garmin–Barracuda	14h 45' 13"
2	Robert Hunter (RSA)	Garmin–Barracuda	+ 5"
3	Ryder Hesjedal (CAN)	Garmin–Barracuda	+ 11"
4	Matthew Goss (AUS)	Orica–GreenEDGE	+ 13"
5	Mark Cavendish (GBR)	Team Sky	+ 14"
6	Geraint Thomas (GBR)	Team Sky	+ 16"
7	Manuele Boaro (ITA)	Team Saxo Bank	+ 19"
8	Christian Vande Velde (USA)	Garmin–Barracuda	+ 26"
9	Joaquim Rodríguez (ESP)	Team Katusha	+ 30"
10	Alexander Kristoff (NOR)	Team Katusha	+ 30"

== Stage 6 ==
11 May 2012 — Urbino to Porto Sant'Elpidio, 210 km (130.5 mi)

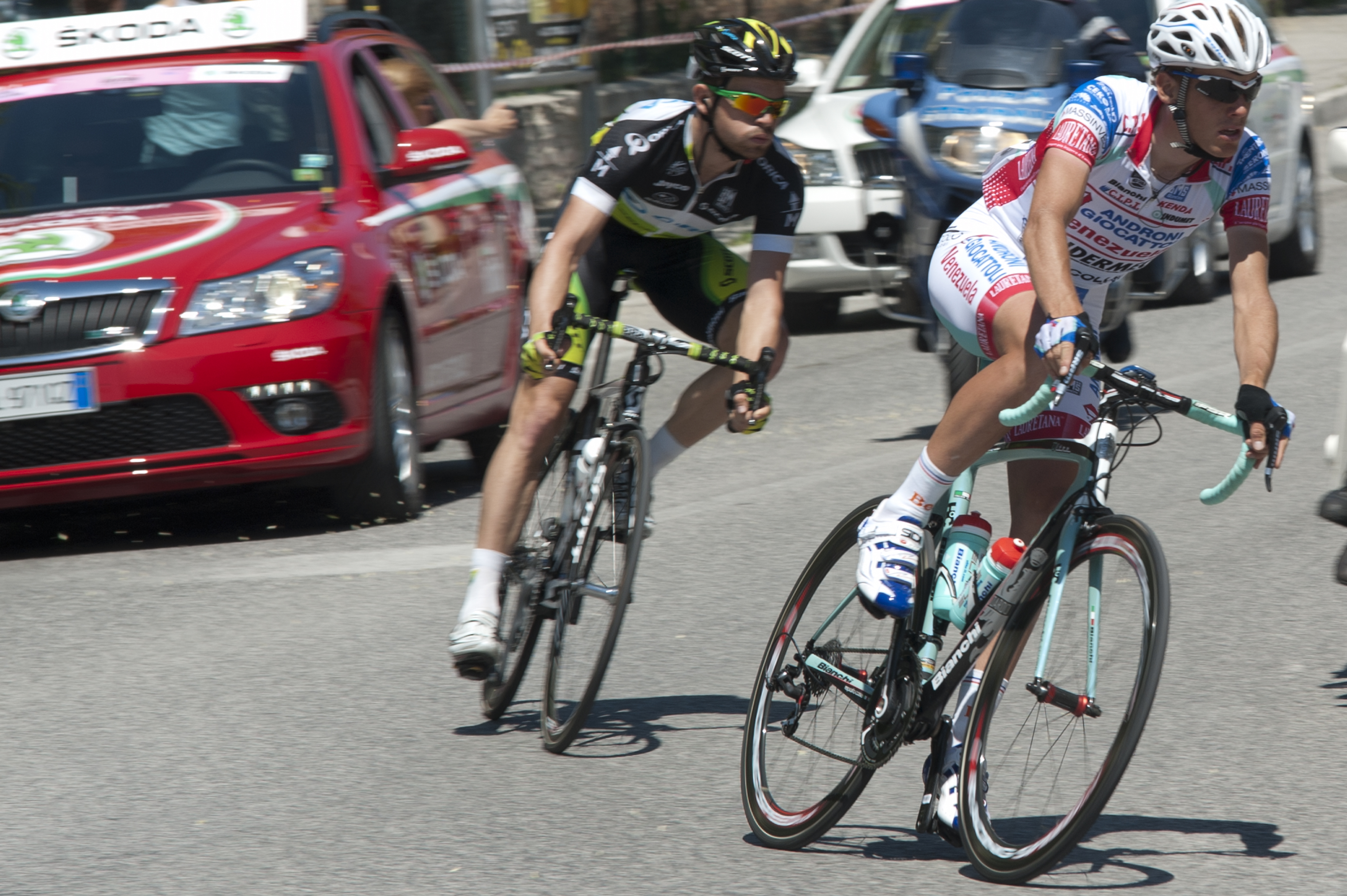
Miguel Ángel Rubiano leads Jens Keukeleire during the stage. Rubiano eventually went on to win the stage by over a minute, and assumed the lead of the mountains classification.

After only fourth-category climbs at best during the early stages of the race, the sixth stage saw the introduction of the higher categorised climbs, with three third-category climbs on the stage's parcours, as well as the second-category Passo della Cappella on gravel roads, all coming after the 90 km (55.9 mi) mark. Fifteen riders representing fourteen teams – only Team Katusha had more than one rider in the breakaway, with riders Gatis Smukulis and Aleksandr Kuschynski – contributed to the opening move of the stage, as they accelerated off the front of the main field inside the first 20 km (12.4 mi) of the stage. Of the fifteen, four riders were dropped very quickly after that, including mountains classification leader Alfredo Balloni (Farnese Vini–Selle Italia), with the best placed of the remaining eleven out front being Team Saxo Bank's Luke Roberts, who had been 25th prior to the stage. Liquigas–Cannondale, who did not have a rider in the move out front, set about trying to bring the gap down to the main field, as the eleven riders held an advantage of close to nine minutes prior to the first climb of the day, the Cingoli.

Omega Pharma–Quick-Step's Michał Gołaś led over the climb, while Miguel Ángel Rubiano (Androni Giocattoli–Venezuela) attacked on all three of the remaining climbs, giving him enough points to replace Balloni as the leader of the mountains classification at stage's end. After sitting up on the first two climbs to allow his breakaway companions – sans one rider, Movistar Team's Pablo Lastras, who abandoned after a crash with Garmin–Barracuda rider Jack Bauer – to rejoin, Rubiano did not wait at the top of the Montegranaro and accelerated away solo. Rubiano continued to extend his gap over the main field in the next few kilometres, extending his gap over his former breakaway companions to a maximum of a minute-and-a-half, while he had three minutes in hand over the peloton. As it transpired, Rubiano continued on to the stage victory, 70 seconds clear of a group of riders consisting of Lampre–ISD's Adriano Malori, Gołaś, Alexsandr Dyachenko of the Astana team, and Cesare Benedetti representing Grand Tour debutants Team NetApp. The field was led over the line 41 seconds later by Orica–GreenEDGE rider Daryl Impey, but Malori gained sufficient time to become the new leader of the race overall, 15 seconds ahead of Gołaś. Rubiano moved into fourth place in the standings behind Ryder Hesjedal (Garmin–Barracuda), half a minute behind Malori.

Stage 6 result

	Rider	Team	Time
1	Miguel Ángel Rubiano (COL)	Androni Giocattoli–Venezuela	5h 38' 30"
2	Adriano Malori (ITA)	Lampre–ISD	+ 1' 10"
3	Michał Gołaś (POL)	Omega Pharma–Quick-Step	+ 1' 10"
4	Alexsandr Dyachenko (KAZ)	Astana	+ 1' 10"
5	Cesare Benedetti (ITA)	Team NetApp	+ 1' 10"
6	Daryl Impey (RSA)	Orica–GreenEDGE	+ 1' 51"
7	Filippo Pozzato (ITA)	Farnese Vini–Selle Italia	+ 1' 51"
8	Fabio Sabatini (ITA)	Liquigas–Cannondale	+ 1' 51"
9	Francisco Ventoso (ESP)	Movistar Team	+ 1' 51"
10	Michał Kwiatkowski (POL)	Omega Pharma–Quick-Step	+ 1' 51"

General classification after stage 6

	Rider	Team	Time
1	Adriano Malori (ITA)	Lampre–ISD	20h 25' 28"
2	Michał Gołaś (POL)	Omega Pharma–Quick-Step	+ 15"
3	Ryder Hesjedal (CAN)	Garmin–Barracuda	+ 17"
4	Miguel Ángel Rubiano (COL)	Androni Giocattoli–Venezuela	+ 30"
5	Christian Vande Velde (USA)	Garmin–Barracuda	+ 32"
6	Joaquim Rodríguez (ESP)	Team Katusha	+ 36"
7	Peter Stetina (USA)	Garmin–Barracuda	+ 37"
8	Daniel Moreno (ESP)	Team Katusha	+ 39"
9	Enrico Gasparotto (ITA)	Astana	+ 39"
10	Luke Roberts (AUS)	Team Saxo Bank	+ 41"

== Stage 7 ==
12 May 2012 — Recanati to Rocca di Cambio, 205 km (127.4 mi)

The race's first summit finish occurred during the seventh stage, with a second-category climb up to Rocca di Cambio, at an altitude of 1,392 metres (4,567 ft). Although there was only one other climb on the parcours – the Colle Galluccio – the stage was considered hilly, as the majority of the stage consisted of frequent hills and descents, and was run above 500 m (1,600 ft) except for the opening 50 km (31.1 mi). The primary breakaway of the stage was formed early in the stage, when a wave of four riders went clear. Fumiyuki Beppu (Orica–GreenEDGE) was joined in the breakaway by Vacansoleil–DCM's Mirko Selvaggi as well as two riders representing UCI Professional Continental Teams; Reto Hollenstein for Team NetApp and Farnese Vini–Selle Italia rider Matteo Rabottini, with the quartet quickly gaining a substantial advantage over the main field, as they were over nine minutes clear after 27 km (16.8 mi).

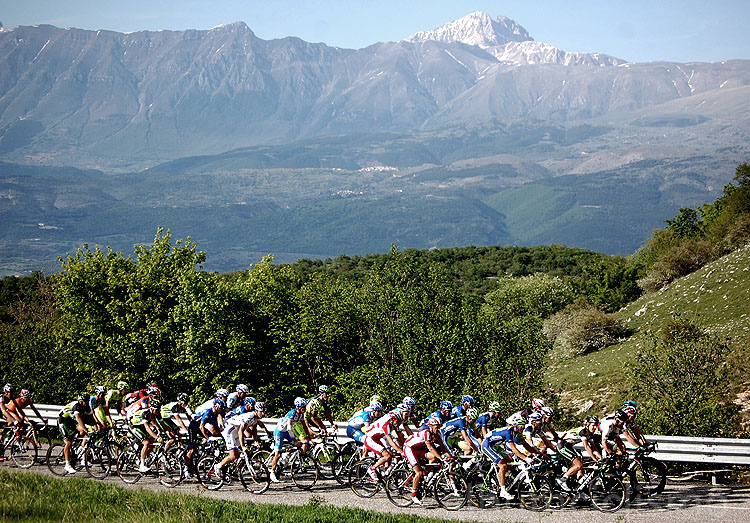
The peloton, on the stage's final climb to a summit finish at Rocca di Cambio.

The peloton slowly closed the time down at first, but by the time that the four leaders had gone over the climb and then moved on to the intermediate sprint in L'Aquila, efforts from Garmin–Barracuda, Team Katusha and Lampre–ISD had brought the time gap down to just under two-and-a-half minutes. Rabottini then attacked his breakaway companions, soon breaking clear, while in the peloton, several mini-attacks were established, with Colnago–CSF Bardiani rider Stefano Pirazzi being caught before making a second move while Valerio Agnoli tried to follow for Liquigas–Cannondale. Pirazzi caught up to Rabottini, while Movistar Team's José Herrada and Daniele Pietropolli (Lampre–ISD) caught up to Agnoli, with Herrada later joining the front duo and BMC Racing Team's Ivan Santaromita established an all-Italian chase group with Agnoli and Pietropolli. Several Androni Giocattoli–Venezuela riders attacked on the climb, which in effect brought the main field up towards the leaders, with Rabottini being absorbed back after failing to hold on to the pace set by Herrada and Pirazzi.

Pirazzi tried to attack Herrada on several occasions within the final 5 km (3.1 mi) of the stage, but he could not establish a big enough gap to get clear. Pirazzi then wasted his chance of a stage victory by making a mistake on a right-hand corner with around 1.5 km (0.9 mi); he overshot the corner and this gave Herrada a chance to extend his lead, but the peloton were closing all the time. In the end, Herrada was ultimately caught with 700 m (2,300 ft) to go where, on the steepest bit of the climb, with a gradient of 10% in places. Lampre–ISD held station at the front of the peloton, with Przemysław Niemiec protecting Michele Scarponi, before Scarponi made an attack on the climb, with Astana's Paolo Tiralongo going with him; Scarponi held the lead until the final corner, when Tiralongo came around the outside of him, to take his second Giro stage victory. With Scarponi's team-mate Adriano Malori dropping off the back of the peloton at the foot of the climb, Ryder Hesjedal – fifth on the stage, five seconds behind Tiralongo – assumed the lead of the race, to become the first Canadian rider to wear the leader's pink jersey. Fifteen seconds behind, Tiralongo moved into second place ahead of Team Katusha's Joaquim Rodríguez.

Stage 7 result

	Rider	Team	Time
1	Paolo Tiralongo (ITA)	Astana	5h 51' 03"
2	Michele Scarponi (ITA)	Lampre–ISD	s.t.
3	Fränk Schleck (LUX)	RadioShack–Nissan	+ 3"
4	Joaquim Rodríguez (ESP)	Team Katusha	+ 3"
5	Ryder Hesjedal (CAN)	Garmin–Barracuda	+ 5"
6	Domenico Pozzovivo (ITA)	Colnago–CSF Bardiani	+ 9"
7	Daniel Moreno (ESP)	Team Katusha	+ 9"
8	Ivan Basso (ITA)	Liquigas–Cannondale	+ 9"
9	Mikel Nieve (ESP)	Euskaltel–Euskadi	+ 11"
10	Gianluca Brambilla (ITA)	Colnago–CSF Bardiani	+ 11"

General classification after stage 7

	Rider	Team	Time
1	Ryder Hesjedal (CAN)	Garmin–Barracuda	26h 16' 53"
2	Paolo Tiralongo (ITA)	Astana	+ 15"
3	Joaquim Rodríguez (ESP)	Team Katusha	+ 17"
4	Christian Vande Velde (USA)	Garmin–Barracuda	+ 21"
5	Peter Stetina (USA)	Garmin–Barracuda	+ 26"
6	Daniel Moreno (ESP)	Team Katusha	+ 26"
7	Roman Kreuziger (CZE)	Astana	+ 35"
8	Ivan Basso (ITA)	Liquigas–Cannondale	+ 40"
9	Damiano Caruso (ITA)	Liquigas–Cannondale	+ 45"
10	Dario Cataldo (ITA)	Omega Pharma–Quick-Step	+ 46"

== Stage 8 ==
13 May 2012 — Sulmona to Lago Laceno, 229 km (142.3 mi)

For the third successive day, the riders contended with a stage that was designated as a medium-mountain stage, with the race reaching its most southerly point by the finish in Laceno. Again, only two categorised climbs were scheduled; the fourth-category Valico di Macerone climb was contested at the 65.5 km (40.7 mi) mark, before descending down and ramping up towards the finish, with the day's other climb – the Colle Molella – coming just 4.4 km (2.7 mi) prior to the finish. The primary breakaway of the stage was formed early in the stage, when a wave of four riders – Movistar Team's Andrey Amador, Julien Bérard of Ag2r–La Mondiale, Vacansoleil–DCM rider Tomasz Marczyński and Miguel Mínguez (Euskaltel–Euskadi) – went clear after 15 km (9.3 mi) of the day's running. By the midpoint of the stage, the lead quartet held a lead of over eleven minutes after the peloton elected not to chase them down at first.

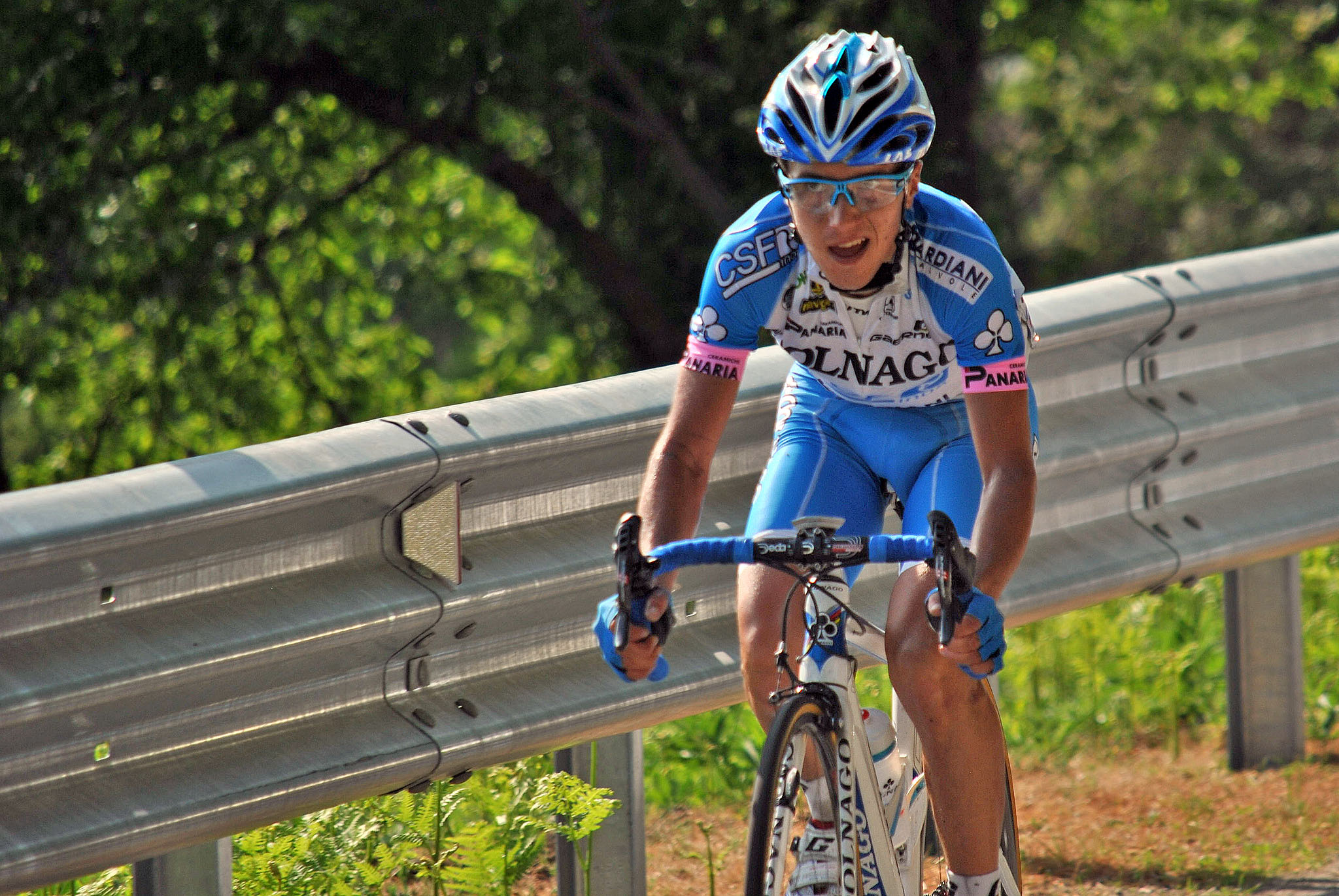
Domenico Pozzovivo attacked with 6.8 km (4.2 mi) to go, ultimately winning his first Giro stage by 23 seconds, ahead of his closest challenger, Beñat Intxausti.

Amador and Marczyński went clear of their companions, after their advantage had been reduced to four minutes by the time of the intermediate sprint with around 65 km (40.4 mi) to go in San Giorgio del Sannio. With Garmin–Barracuda, Astana and Colnago–CSF Bardiani driving the pace on the front of the peloton, the advantage that Amador and Marczyński was reduced steadily, and they were caught with 17 km (10.6 mi) remaining. Astana's pace, mainly driven by Amstel Gold Race winner Enrico Gasparotto put numerous riders in trouble, including stage six winner Miguel Ángel Rubiano (Androni Giocattoli–Venezuela), but after Gasparotto pulled off, it was left to BMC Racing Team and Liquigas–Cannondale to set the tempo on the Colle Molella. At 6.8 km (4.2 mi) to go, Giro del Trentino winner Domenico Pozzovivo attacked, and quickly gained a 30-second gap before any movement was made in the peloton, when Beñat Intxausti (Movistar Team) attempted to follow him; he could not catch him, as Pozzovivo held on to win his first Giro stage by 23 seconds. Intxausti managed to hold on to second place, with a small group being led home by third-placed Joaquim Rodríguez of Team Katusha, four seconds further back. Ryder Hesjedal maintained the maglia rosa, with Rodríguez moving ahead of Paolo Tiralongo into second place – nine seconds behind Hesjedal – while Intxausti and Pozzovivo moved into fifth and thirteenth in the overall classification respectively.

Stage 8 result

	Rider	Team	Time
1	Domenico Pozzovivo (ITA)	Colnago–CSF Bardiani	6h 06' 05"
2	Beñat Intxausti (ESP)	Movistar Team	+ 23"
3	Joaquim Rodríguez (ESP)	Team Katusha	+ 27"
4	Thomas De Gendt (BEL)	Vacansoleil–DCM	+ 27"
5	Dario Cataldo (ITA)	Omega Pharma–Quick-Step	+ 27"
6	Damiano Caruso (ITA)	Liquigas–Cannondale	+ 27"
7	Gianluca Brambilla (ITA)	Colnago–CSF Bardiani	+ 27"
8	Bartosz Huzarski (POL)	Team NetApp	+ 27"
9	José Rujano (VEN)	Androni Giocattoli–Venezuela	+ 27"
10	John Gadret (FRA)	Ag2r–La Mondiale	+ 27"

General classification after stage 8

	Rider	Team	Time
1	Ryder Hesjedal (CAN)	Garmin–Barracuda	32h 23' 25"
2	Joaquim Rodríguez (ESP)	Team Katusha	+ 9"
3	Paolo Tiralongo (ITA)	Astana	+ 15"
4	Roman Kreuziger (CZE)	Astana	+ 35"
5	Beñat Intxausti (ESP)	Movistar Team	+ 35"
6	Ivan Basso (ITA)	Liquigas–Cannondale	+ 40"
7	Damiano Caruso (ITA)	Liquigas–Cannondale	+ 45"
8	Dario Cataldo (ITA)	Omega Pharma–Quick-Step	+ 46"
9	Fränk Schleck (LUX)	RadioShack–Nissan	+ 48"
10	Eros Capecchi (ITA)	Liquigas–Cannondale	+ 52"

== Stage 9 ==
14 May 2012 — San Giorgio del Sannio to Frosinone, 166 km (103.1 mi)

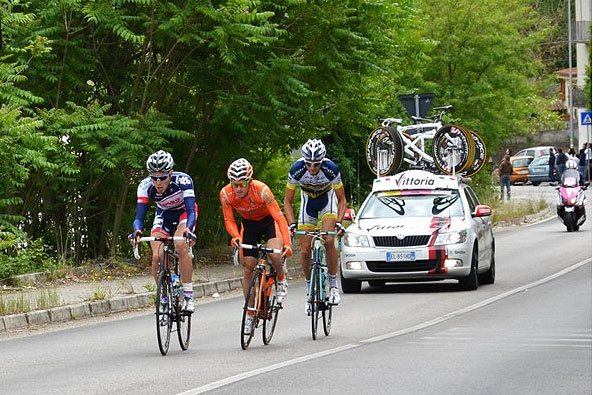
The day's breakaway approaching the town of Benevento, in the opening 10 km (6.2 mi) of the stage. Brian Bulgaç leads Pierre Cazaux and Martijn Keizer.

With no categorised climbs on the parcours, the stage – although undulating – was widely expected to be a battle between the sprinters in Frosinone, with the top two riders in the points classification, Team Sky's Mark Cavendish and Orica–GreenEDGE's Matthew Goss widely tipped for stage honours, with Mark Renshaw (Rabobank) also looking to usurp his former HTC–Highroad team-mates for a first World Tour win. Lotto–Belisol rider Brian Bulgaç made it into the breakaway for the second time in five stages, and was joined at the head of the race by Martijn Keizer of the Vacansoleil–DCM team, and Euskaltel–Euskadi's Pierre Cazaux. The breakaway trio's maximum advantage over the main field came around an hour into the stage, with the gap breaching the four-minute mark, but with none of the three riders in any contention to challenge overall leader Ryder Hesjedal (Garmin–Barracuda), the teams of the general classification contenders allowed them to hang off the front. With Orica–GreenEDGE on the front of the peloton, the advantage started to dwindle and with 35 km (21.7 mi) remaining in the stage, their lead was under a minute. Keizer left his two rivals behind and began a solo escape in the hope of staying clear of the peloton all the way to Frosinone.

His hopes were ended halfway towards the finish, as he was caught with around 17 km (10.6 mi) to go. The small hills just outside Frosinone saw several mini-attacks; Lotto–Belisol pair Dennis Vanendert and Gaëtan Bille, Matteo Rabottini (Farnese Vini–Selle Italia) and Sonny Colbrelli (Colnago–CSF Bardiani) were the first quartet to make moves, but it set up Joaquim Rodríguez, second in the overall classification for Team Katusha, to have a go himself. With help from team-mate Ángel Vicioso, Rodríguez tried to break clear but was promptly recaptured by the main field. Several other mini-attacks occurred on the run-in to the finish, but the field was together as they approached a left-hand turn with 400 m (1,300 ft) to go. Contact between Goss and Farnese Vini–Selle Italia's Filippo Pozzato sent both riders to the tarmac, with other riders, including Cavendish, being forced down as well. Pozzato blamed Goss for the crash, while Orica–GreenEDGE sporting director Matt White directed the blame at Pozzato. With a reduced number of sprinters for the finish, RadioShack–Nissan rider Giacomo Nizzolo was best placed for the sprint, but a quick-closing Francisco Ventoso of the Movistar Team wrested the stage win away from Nizzolo, his second career Giro stage victory. Ventoso was followed over the line by Androni Giocattoli–Venezuela's Fabio Felline, Nizzolo and Liquigas–Cannondale's Damiano Caruso, the young rider classification leader. Hesjedal was also in the top ten of the stage results, and maintained his overall lead, having covered off Rodríguez's late-stage attack.

Stage 9 result

	Rider	Team	Time
1	Francisco Ventoso (ESP)	Movistar Team	3h 39' 15"
2	Fabio Felline (ITA)	Androni Giocattoli–Venezuela	s.t.
3	Giacomo Nizzolo (ITA)	RadioShack–Nissan	s.t.
4	Damiano Caruso (ITA)	Liquigas–Cannondale	s.t.
5	Daniel Schorn (AUT)	Team NetApp	s.t.
6	Alexander Kristoff (NOR)	Team Katusha	s.t.
7	Ryder Hesjedal (CAN)	Garmin–Barracuda	s.t.
8	Matthias Brändle (AUT)	Team NetApp	s.t.
9	Manuel Belletti (ITA)	Ag2r–La Mondiale	s.t.
10	Daryl Impey (RSA)	Orica–GreenEDGE	s.t.

General classification after stage 9

	Rider	Team	Time
1	Ryder Hesjedal (CAN)	Garmin–Barracuda	36h 02' 40"
2	Joaquim Rodríguez (ESP)	Team Katusha	+ 9"
3	Paolo Tiralongo (ITA)	Astana	+ 15"
4	Roman Kreuziger (CZE)	Astana	+ 35"
5	Beñat Intxausti (ESP)	Movistar Team	+ 35"
6	Ivan Basso (ITA)	Liquigas–Cannondale	+ 40"
7	Damiano Caruso (ITA)	Liquigas–Cannondale	+ 45"
8	Dario Cataldo (ITA)	Omega Pharma–Quick-Step	+ 46"
9	Fränk Schleck (LUX)	RadioShack–Nissan	+ 48"
10	Eros Capecchi (ITA)	Liquigas–Cannondale	+ 52"

== Stage 10 ==
15 May 2012 — Civitavecchia to Assisi, 186 km (115.6 mi)

Although race organisers characterised the stage as "medium-mountain", only one climb was categorised on the parcours, with that being the hilltop finish in Assisi. The climb was in two parts, peaking at 15% in places on the first ascent, and after a slight descent, an average gradient of 8.5% for the final 1.2 km (0.7 mi) with elements of the climb being held on pavé. Team Katusha's Joaquim Rodríguez – second place overnight, nine seconds behind leader Ryder Hesjedal (Garmin–Barracuda) – was the favourite for the stage, having won numerous races on similarly steep finishes in the previous twelve months, including two stage victories at the 2011 Vuelta a España and a win at April's La Flèche Wallonne.

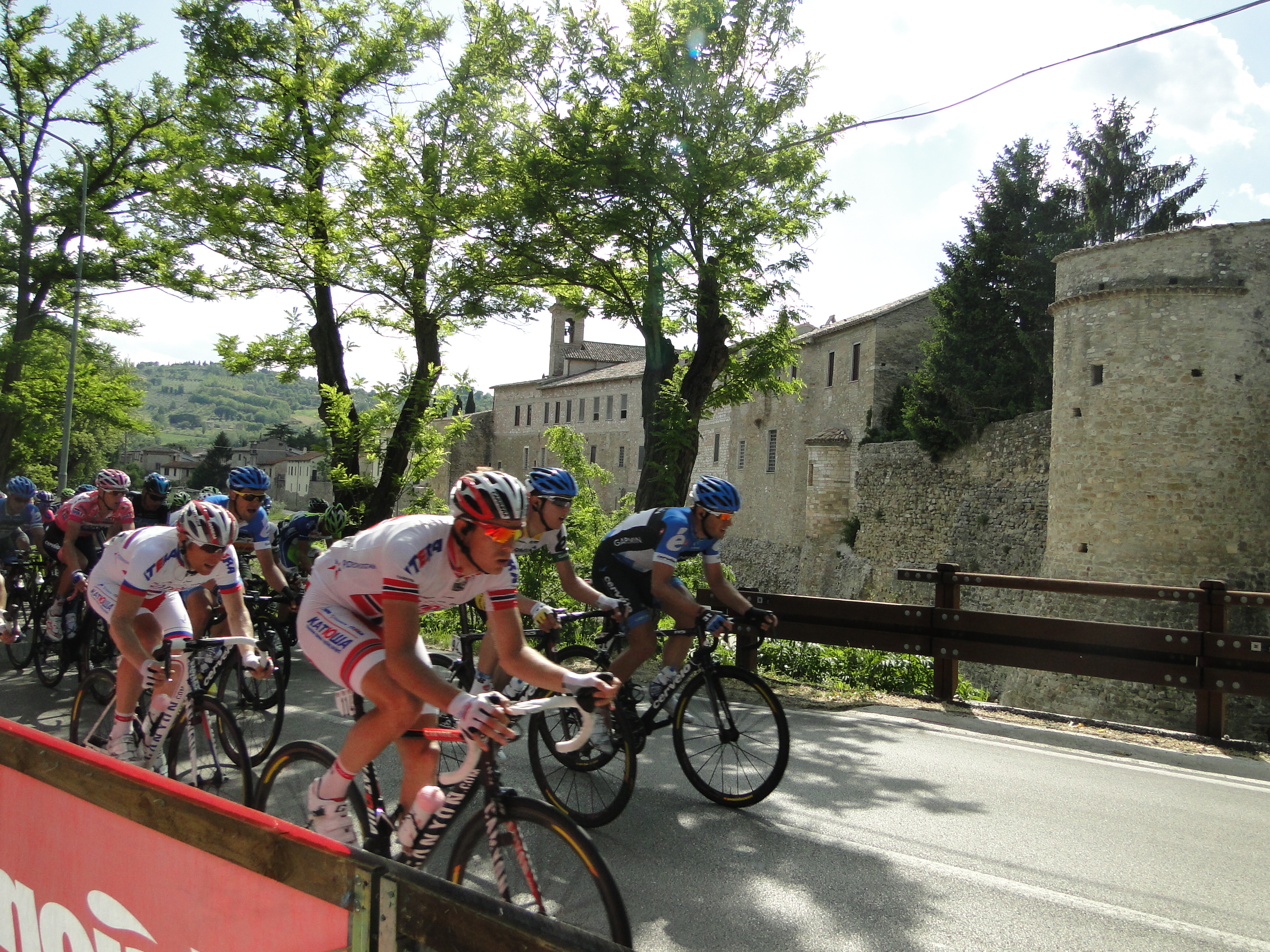
Team Katusha and Garmin–Barracuda at the front of the peloton during the stage, protecting their respective riders in the top two of the general classification, Joaquim Rodríguez and Ryder Hesjedal.

After several, yet unsuccessful, mini-attacks in the opening few kilometres of the stage, a breakaway move of riders was established; consisting of Vacansoleil–DCM rider Martijn Keizer – for the second day running – with Euskaltel–Euskadi's Miguel Mínguez also making it out front for the second time during the race. They were joined by Ag2r–La Mondiale rider Guillaume Bonnafond, Matthias Brändle of Team NetApp and Farnese Vini–Selle Italia's Francesco Failli, and this quintet went clear after 10 km (6.2 mi). The group managed to extend their advantage to a maximum of almost five minutes after 50 km (31.1 mi); with Bonnafond being best placed of the five riders in the overall classification, trailing Hesjedal by almost 24 minutes, Team Katusha and Garmin–Barracuda protected their respective highest-placed riders by staying towards the front of the peloton. Failli attempted to drop his breakaway companions with around 30 km (18.6 mi) to go, but in the process destabilised Keizer and Brändle from the group; Rabobank's Stef Clement later caught those two riders after accelerating off the front of the pack.

With added assistance from Clement, the trio later rejoined Bonnafond, Mínguez and Failli at the head of the race, and held a lead over the peloton, led by Hesjedal's Garmin–Barracuda squad, of around a minute; their strong pace at the front managed to bring the gap down to about twenty seconds with 10 km (6.2 mi) remaining. The leaders were caught 2.5 km (1.6 mi) later, with several teams moving forward to be in a prime position for the climb up to Assisi. Tomas Vaitkus (Orica–GreenEDGE) and Tom-Jelte Slagter (Rabobank) tried to go clear on the lower stages of the climb, but it was not until Ag2r–La Mondiale's John Gadret and Team Sky rider Rigoberto Urán hit the front that the main group of riders started to accelerate. Daniel Moreno led the group, protecting Rodríguez but as he stepped aside, it was Paolo Tiralongo that led the move for Astana. Slagter then tried to go clear once again, with only Rodríguez and Team NetApp's Bartosz Huzarski following closely; Rodríguez left his sprint until 150 m (490 ft) to go, but was sufficient to take the stage victory – his first Giro win, meaning that he had won a stage in all three Grand Tours – and with bonus seconds on the line, the leader's pink jersey for the first time in his career. Huzarski was second, with Slagter fading to seventh behind Hesjedal.

Stage 10 result

	Rider	Team	Time
1	Joaquim Rodríguez (ESP)	Team Katusha	4h 25' 05"
2	Bartosz Huzarski (POL)	Team NetApp	+ 2"
3	Giovanni Visconti (ITA)	Movistar Team	+ 2"
4	Domenico Pozzovivo (ITA)	Colnago–CSF Bardiani	+ 6"
5	John Gadret (FRA)	Ag2r–La Mondiale	+ 6"
6	Ryder Hesjedal (CAN)	Garmin–Barracuda	+ 6"
7	Tom-Jelte Slagter (NED)	Rabobank	+ 6"
8	Dario Cataldo (ITA)	Omega Pharma–Quick-Step	+ 6"
9	Roman Kreuziger (CZE)	Astana	+ 6"
10	Rigoberto Urán (COL)	Team Sky	+ 6"

General classification after stage 10

	Rider	Team	Time
1	Joaquim Rodríguez (ESP)	Team Katusha	40h 27' 34"
2	Ryder Hesjedal (CAN)	Garmin–Barracuda	+ 17"
3	Paolo Tiralongo (ITA)	Astana	+ 32"
4	Roman Kreuziger (CZE)	Astana	+ 52"
5	Beñat Intxausti (ESP)	Movistar Team	+ 52"
6	Ivan Basso (ITA)	Liquigas–Cannondale	+ 57"
7	Damiano Caruso (ITA)	Liquigas–Cannondale	+ 1' 02"
8	Dario Cataldo (ITA)	Omega Pharma–Quick-Step	+ 1' 03"
9	Eros Capecchi (ITA)	Liquigas–Cannondale	+ 1' 09"
10	Rigoberto Urán (COL)	Team Sky	+ 1' 10"

== Stage 11 ==
16 May 2012 — Assisi to Montecatini Terme, 255 km (158.4 mi)

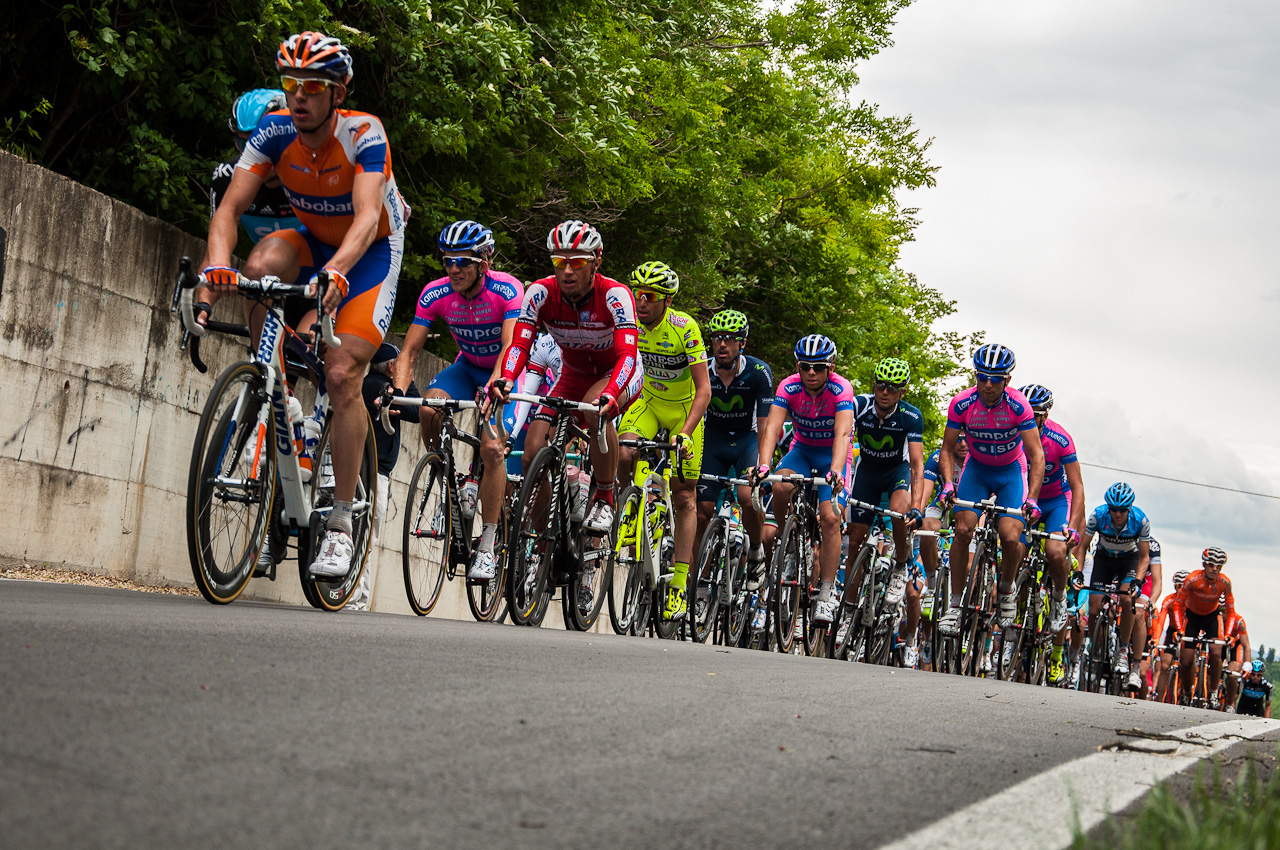
The peloton, being led by members of various different squads, negotiate a hill on the parcours.

The midway point of the race was marked by the longest stage of the entire itinerary; a 255 km (158.4 mi) long stage ideally suited for the sprinters, despite a late-race climb of Vico, with around 11 km (6.8 mi) to go before the finish in Montecatini Terme. Inside the opening 10 km (6.2 mi) of the stage, six riders – Euskaltel–Euskadi's Adrián Sáez, FDJ–BigMat rider Mickaël Delage, Olivier Kaisen (Lotto–Belisol), Manuele Boaro of Team Saxo Bank, Vacansoleil–DCM rider Stefan Denifl and Simone Ponzi of Astana – advanced clear of the main field, and they managed to extend their advantage to a maximum of almost five minutes. The peloton was keeping the gap in check however, despite Denifl – the best-placed of the sextet – trailing overnight leader Joaquim Rodríguez (Team Katusha) by almost 42 minutes.

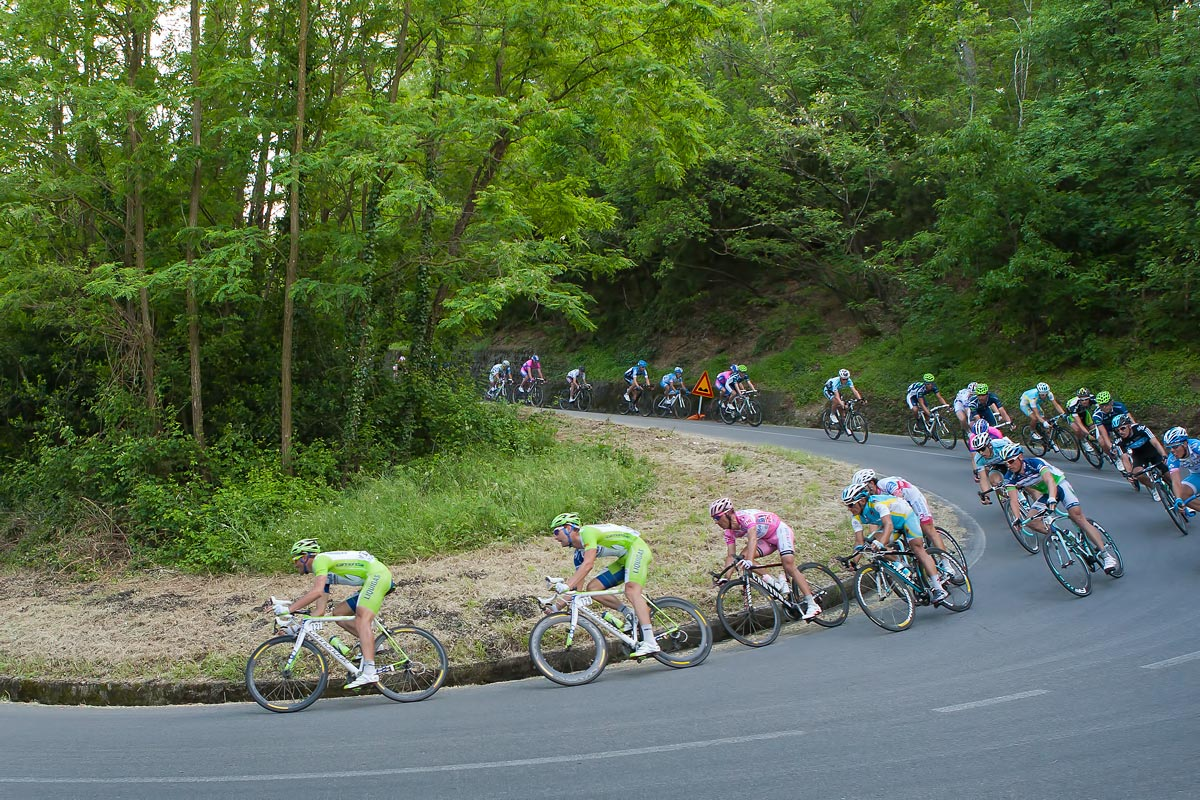
The peloton, pictured around 15 km (9.3 mi) from the finish of the stage. The field is led by Liquigas–Cannondale pair Ivan Basso and Eros Capecchi, with overall leader Joaquim Rodríguez, in the pink jersey in third wheel.

With Rabobank, Team Sky and Team Katusha doing the majority of the work on the front of the peloton, the gap that the breakaway held fluctuated between two and four minutes; at the summit of the stage's first of two climbs, the Poggio alla Croce after 100 km (62.1 mi), the gap that the breakaway – now minus Ponzi, who had fallen back to the peloton after the first hour's racing – held was just two minutes. The time gap reduced steadily after that, with around 30 km (18.6 mi) to go, the gap was just a number of seconds. At this point, Boaro – a proficient time trial rider, having been national champion as a junior, and finished runner-up to Adriano Malori in the 2011 Italian championships – attacked his breakaway companions. Boaro managed to hold out off the front until the final finishing circuit, 14.4 km (8.9 mi) in length, with the Movistar Team leading the way.

A mini-attack occurred on the climb at Vico, but it was pulled back quickly after; in effect, guaranteeing a bunch sprint. Team Sky tried to set up the finish for Mark Cavendish, but a miscue on the final corner by leadout men Peter Kennaugh and Geraint Thomas hampered the world champion, allowing Tomas Vaitkus (Orica–GreenEDGE) and Androni Giocattoli–Venezuela's Roberto Ferrari to get through and contest the finish. Behind that, Colnago–CSF Bardiani's sprinter Sacha Modolo hit the tarmac for the second time during the race, having been involved in the stage 3 incident. Ferrari finished stronger, and beat out his chasers for his first Giro win, with Omega Pharma–Quick-Step rider Francesco Chicchi outdragging Vaitkus for second. Cavendish finished an unhappy fourth, but did take the points classification lead from Vaitkus' team-mate Matthew Goss. There were no other changes to the jersey holders, with Rodríguez holding the overall lead into the second half of the race.

Stage 11 result

	Rider	Team	Time
1	Roberto Ferrari (ITA)	Androni Giocattoli–Venezuela	6h 49' 05"
2	Francesco Chicchi (ITA)	Omega Pharma–Quick-Step	s.t.
3	Tomas Vaitkus (LTU)	Orica–GreenEDGE	s.t.
4	Mark Cavendish (GBR)	Team Sky	s.t.
5	Manuel Belletti (ITA)	Ag2r–La Mondiale	s.t.
6	Giacomo Nizzolo (ITA)	RadioShack–Nissan	s.t.
7	Daniel Schorn (AUT)	Team NetApp	s.t.
8	Arnaud Démare (FRA)	FDJ–BigMat	s.t.
9	Danilo Wyss (SUI)	BMC Racing Team	s.t.
10	Geoffrey Soupe (FRA)	FDJ–BigMat	s.t.

General classification after stage 11

	Rider	Team	Time
1	Joaquim Rodríguez (ESP)	Team Katusha	47h 16' 39"
2	Ryder Hesjedal (CAN)	Garmin–Barracuda	+ 17"
3	Paolo Tiralongo (ITA)	Astana	+ 32"
4	Roman Kreuziger (CZE)	Astana	+ 52"
5	Beñat Intxausti (ESP)	Movistar Team	+ 52"
6	Ivan Basso (ITA)	Liquigas–Cannondale	+ 57"
7	Damiano Caruso (ITA)	Liquigas–Cannondale	+ 1' 02"
8	Dario Cataldo (ITA)	Omega Pharma–Quick-Step	+ 1' 03"
9	Eros Capecchi (ITA)	Liquigas–Cannondale	+ 1' 09"
10	Rigoberto Urán (COL)	Team Sky	+ 1' 10"

For further results, see 2012 Giro d'Italia, Stage 12 to Stage 21
