= Roberto Ferrari (cyclist) =

Italian racing cyclist

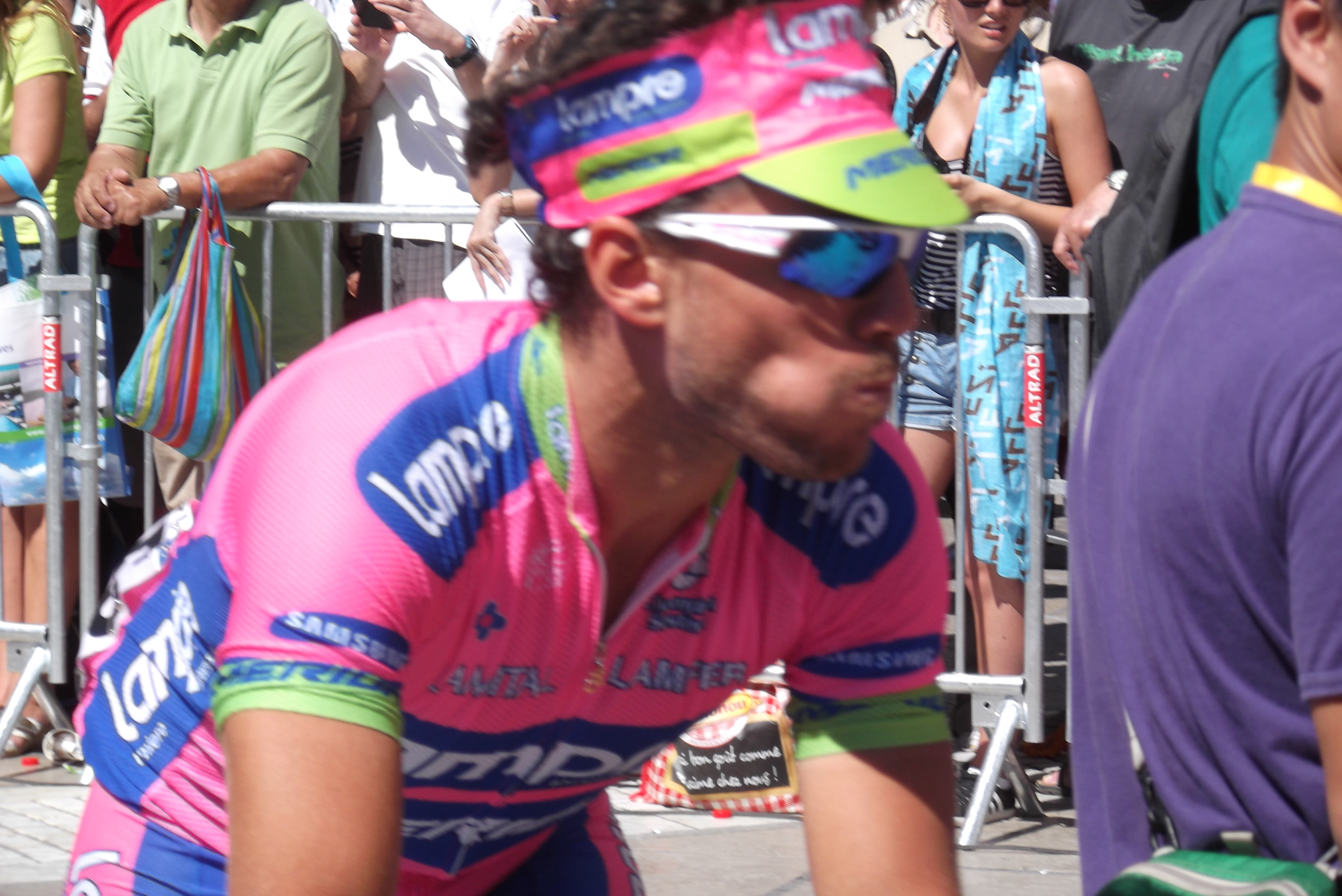

Personal information
- Full name: Roberto Ferrari
- Born: 9 March 1983 (age 43) Gavardo, Italy
- Height: 1.73 m (5 ft 8 in)
- Weight: 70 kg (154 lb; 11 st 0 lb)

Cycling career
- Sport: Cycling
- Current team: Retired
- Discipline: Road
- Role: Rider
- Rider type: Sprinter

Amateur teams
- 2002: Colibrì
- 2003–2004: L'Edile
- 2005–2006: U.C. Trevigiani–Dynamon
- 2006: Team Tenax (stagiaire)

Professional teams
- 2007: Team Tenax
- 2008–2009: LPR Brakes–Ballan
- 2010: De Rosa–Stac Plastic
- 2011–2012: Androni Giocattoli
- 2013–2019: Lampre–Merida

Major wins
- Grand Tours Giro d'Italia 1 individual stage (2012)

Roberto Ferrari (born 9 March 1983) is an Italian former professional cyclist, who competed professionally between 2007 and 2019 for the Tenax, LPR Brakes–Farnese Vini, De Rosa–Stac Plastic, Androni Giocattoli–Venezuela, and UAE Team Emirates teams.

== Career ==
Ferrari was born in Gavardo. After stage 3 of the 2012 Giro d'Italia in Horsens, Denmark, Ferrari was relegated from 10th to 192nd position after the race jury ruled that he was responsible for a crash that brought down world champion Mark Cavendish and race leader Taylor Phinney since he swerved from the left to the right side of the road in the final meters. He stated after that mishap that "I don't care what is going on behind me". He gained extensive disapproval with this statement, from within the professional peloton and from the public. Ferrari later won stage 11 – the longest stage of the race – in a sprint finish in Montecatini Terme.

== Major results ==
2004
9th Trofeo Franco Balestra
2005
6th Circuito del Porto
8th Trofeo Città di Brescia
2006
1st GP Città di Felino
1st Trofeo Città di Brescia
1st Stage 2 Giro della Regione Friuli Venezia Giulia
4th Trofeo Gianfranco Bianchin
8th Trofeo Franco Balestra
2008
1st Prologue Tour Ivoirien de la Paix
4th Gran Premio della Costa Etruschi
2009
1st Memorial Marco Pantani
4th Grand Prix de Denain
2010
1st Gran Premio di Lugano
1st Giro del Friuli
1st Stage 5 Brixia Tour
5th Gran Premio Industria e Commercio Artigianato Carnaghese
5th Gran Premio Nobili Rubinetterie
10th GP Industria & Artigianato di Larciano
2011
Tour de San Luis

1st Stages 1 & 3

1st Stage 1b (TTT) Settimana Internazionale di Coppi e Bartali
2nd Gran Premio della Costa Etruschi
2012
1st Route Adélie
1st Flèche d'Emeraude
1st Stage 11 Giro d'Italia
4th Coppa Bernocchi
6th Overall Tour de Taiwan

1st Stage 5

2013
2nd Coppa Bernocchi
2015
3rd Gran Premio Bruno Beghelli
2016
3rd Gran Premio di Lugano

=== Grand Tour general classification results timeline ===
Grand Tour	2011	2012	2013	2014	2015	2016	2017	2018
Giro d'Italia	143	147	150	144	133	132	150	—
Tour de France	—	—	157	—	—	—	—	138
Vuelta a España	—	—	—	145	—	—	—	—

Legend
—	Did not compete
DNF	Did not finish
