= Damiano Caruso =

Italian road racing cyclist

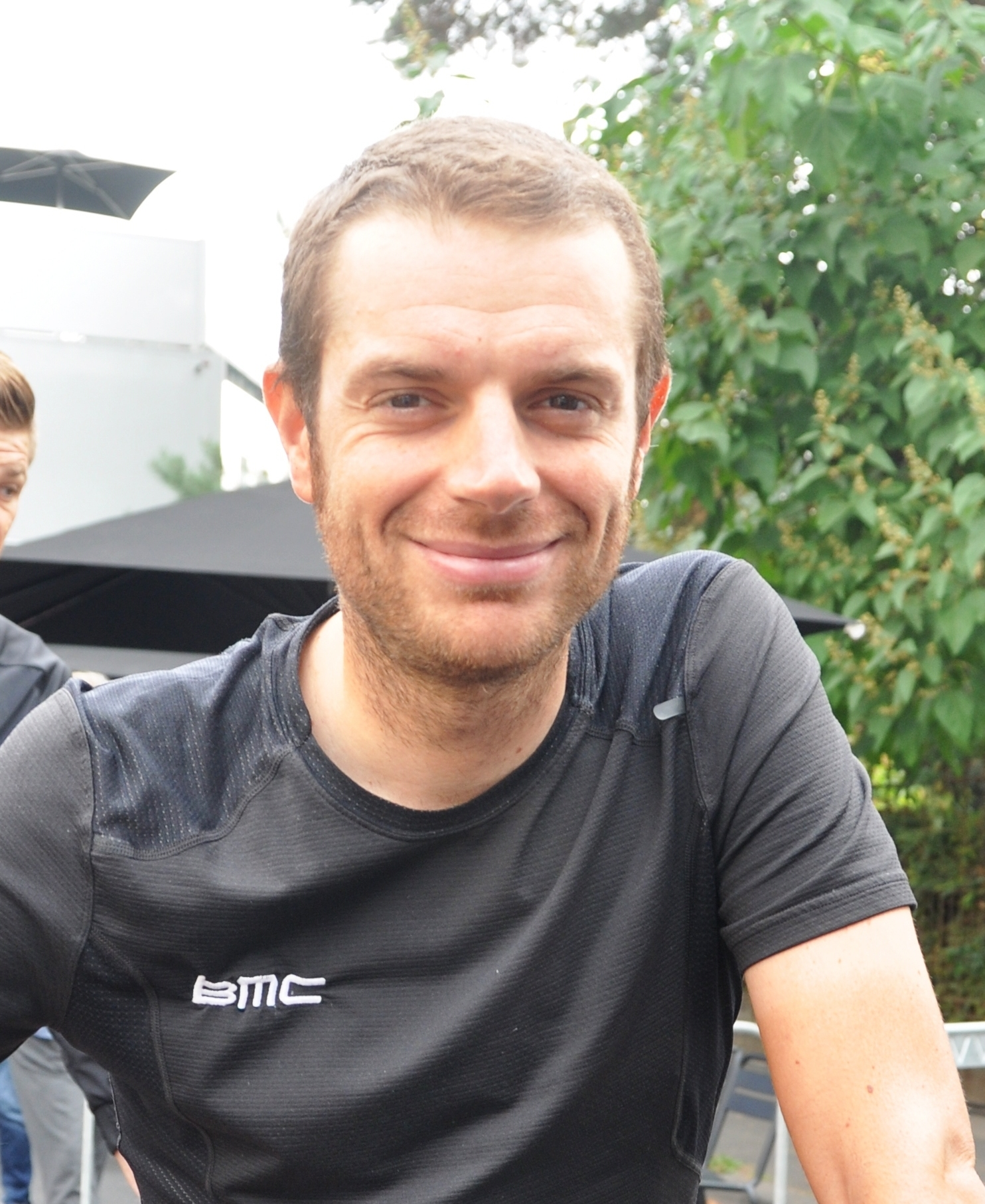
- Caruso in 2018

Personal information
- Full name: Damiano Caruso
- Born: 12 October 1987 (age 39) Ragusa, Italy
- Height: 1.79 m (5 ft 10 in)
- Weight: 68 kg (150 lb)

Cycling career
- Sport: Cycling
- Current team: Team Bahrain Victorious
- Discipline: Road
- Role: Rider
- Rider type: Climber

Professional teams
- 2009: LPR Brakes–Farnese Vini
- 2010: De Rosa–Stac Plastic
- 2011–2014: Liquigas–Cannondale
- 2015–2018: BMC Racing Team
- 2019–: Bahrain–Merida

Major wins
- Grand Tours Tour de France 2 TTT stages (2015, 2018) Giro d'Italia 1 individual stage (2021) Combativity award (2026) Vuelta a España 1 individual stage (2021) 1 TTT stage (2017)

Damiano Caruso (born 12 October 1987) is an Italian professional road bicycle racer, who rides for UCI WorldTeam Team Bahrain Victorious. A stage winner at both the 2021 Giro d'Italia and the 2021 Vuelta a España, Caruso was also the 2008 under-23 Italian national champion for the road race. He competed at the 2020 Summer Olympics, in the road race.

== Career ==
=== Italian-based teams (2009–2014) ===
Born in Ragusa, Sicily, Caruso has competed as a professional since the second half of the 2009 season, competing for the LPR Brakes–Farnese Vini, and De Rosa–Stac Plastic teams, before joining Liquigas–Cannondale for the 2011 season.

In October 2011, the Italian National Olympic Committee (CONI) requested that Caruso be suspended from competition for two years, although backdated from December 2010, in relation to a doping offence in 2007. He was given a backdated one-year ban in February 2012, allowing him to return to competition without being banned, but all his 2011 results were voided.

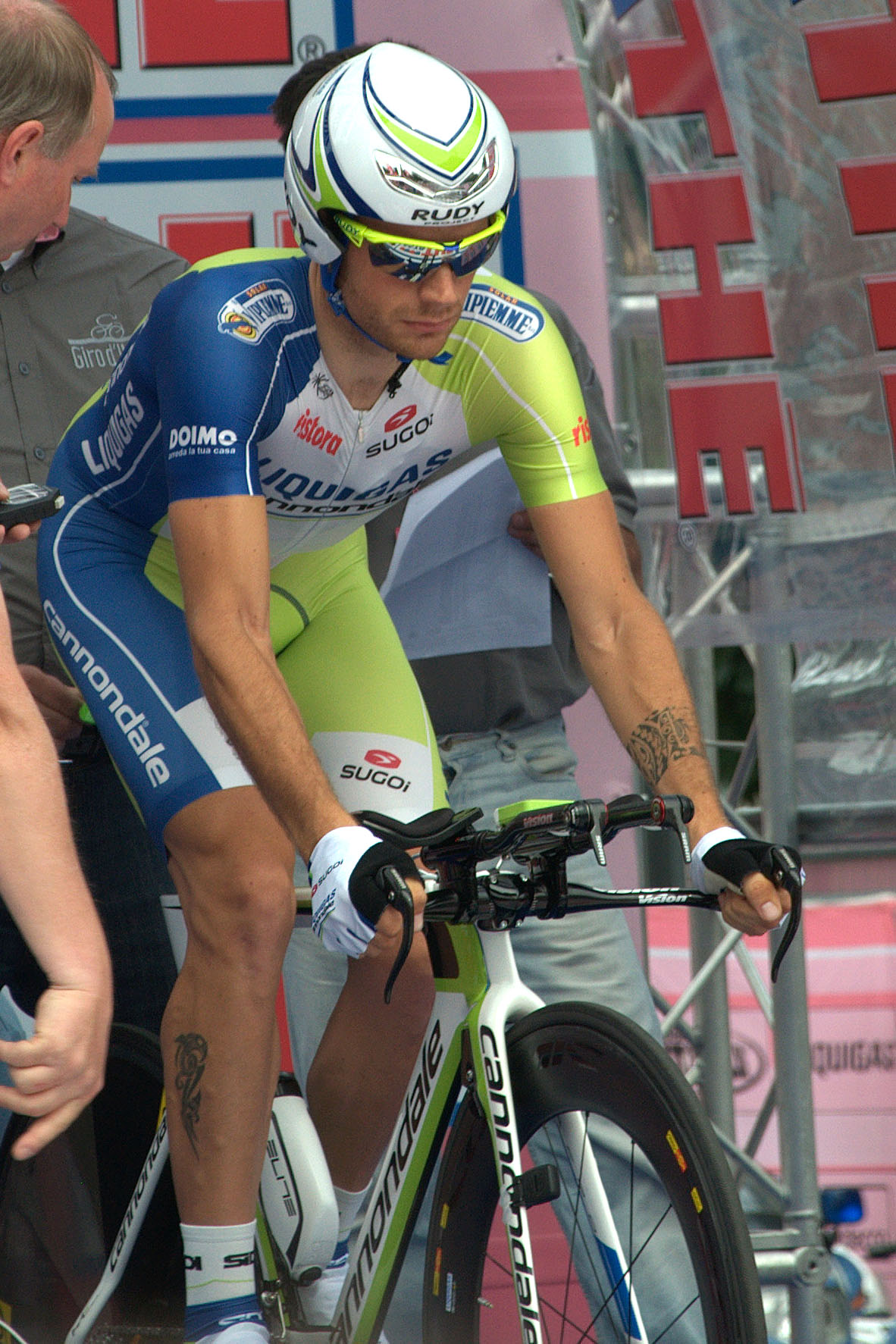
Caruso at the 2012 Giro d'Italia

Caruso held the lead of the young rider classification at the 2012 Giro d'Italia, after Garmin–Barracuda's Peter Stetina lost time on the eighth stage.

=== BMC Racing Team (2015–2018) ===
In August 2014, Caruso signed a multi-year deal with the BMC Racing Team. At the end of 2014, Caruso scored a top-10 placing in the Vuelta a España, finishing ninth in the general classification. In 2015, Caruso finished eighth in the Giro d'Italia, before he was named in the start list for the Tour de France for the first time. Caruso rode each of the following five editions of the race.

=== Bahrain–Merida (2019–present) ===
In August 2018, Bahrain–Merida announced that Caruso would join them from 2019 on an initial two-year contract, with a continued focus on riding as a domestique in Grand Tours and to take opportunities as a team leader in some shorter stage races.

==== 2019–2020 ====
During the 2019 Giro d'Italia, both he and teammate Domenico Pozzovivo rode as mountain domestiques for team leader and general classification favourite Vincenzo Nibali; Nibali finished the race in second place overall.

During the 2020 Tour de France he rode well with Mikel Landa, who finished in fourth place, as Caruso finished in tenth place overall, his first such placing at the Tour de France.

==== 2021 ====
Caruso remained with Team Bahrain Victorious for the 2021 season; going into the Giro d'Italia he would once again ride for Landa, who was considered one of the favourites for overall victory. However, on stage five, Landa was involved in a crash that left him with multiple fractures, and he had to withdraw from the race. As a result, Caruso became Team Bahrain Victorious' highest-placed rider on the general classification, and moved onto the overall podium at the halfway point of the race. In the final five road stages, Caruso took four top-five stage placings, culminating in a stage victory on the penultimate day. In second place overall, and trailing race leader Egan Bernal by two-and-a-half minutes, Caruso attacked with 50 kilometres (31 miles) remaining and caught up to the remnants of the breakaway, along with teammate Pello Bilbao. Caruso outlasted Romain Bardet on the final climb, the Alpe Motta, and soloed to his first Grand Tour stage win. Bernal finished second on the stage, limiting his losses to half a minute, and held an almost two-minute lead going into the final stage individual time trial. Caruso took another 30 seconds on that stage, confirming his second-place overall finish. During the Vuelta a España, Caruso went on a 70-kilometre (43-mile) solo attack and won the mountainous stage nine in Andalusia. He finished in 17th overall, and in conjunction with the performances of teammates Gino Mäder and Jack Haig, who both placed in the top-five overall, Team Bahrain Victorious won the teams classification. He signed a two-year contract extension with the team in October, with an additional year's extension confirmed the following month.

==== 2022 ====
After a seventh-place overall finish at the 2022 Tirreno–Adriatico, Caruso took his first senior general classification victory at the Giro di Sicilia – riding for the Italy national cycling team – where he also won two stages and the points classification. He then placed highly at the Tour de Romandie (sixth) and the Critérium du Dauphiné (fourth), ahead of the Tour de France, where he was co-leader of Team Bahrain Victorious, alongside Jack Haig. Haig withdrew from the race in the first week due to injury, and Caruso also had to withdraw in the final week, due to a positive test for COVID-19 – the first time he had failed to complete a Grand Tour.

==== 2023 ====
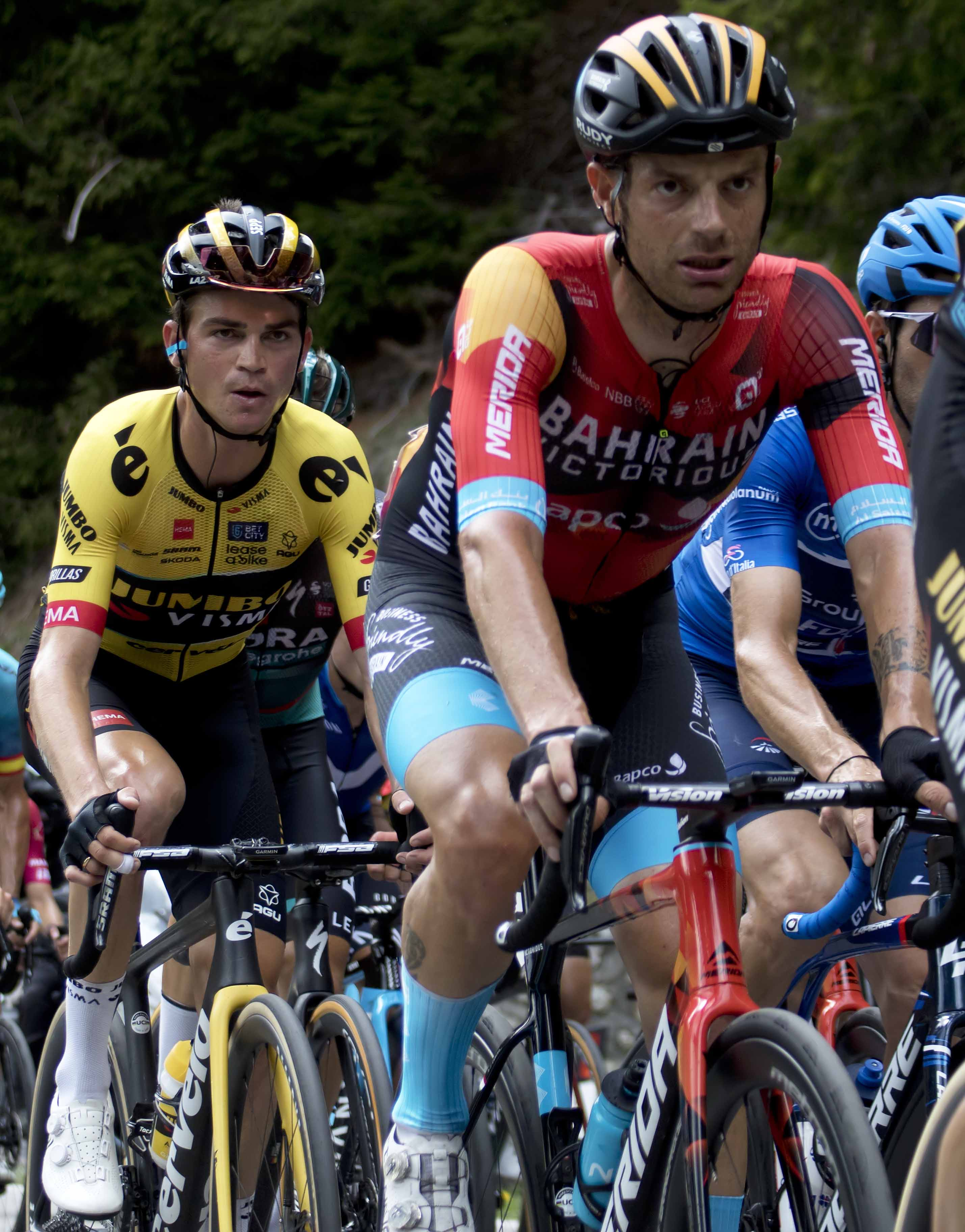
Caruso (right) at the 2023 Giro d'Italia, where he finished in fourth place overall

Caruso started his 2023 season racing in Spain; he finished in seventh overall at February's Vuelta a Andalucía, having finished four of the five stages in the top-ten placings. Another top-ten overall finish followed at April's Giro di Sicilia (tenth), before finishing on the podium at the Tour de Romandie at the end of the month; he finished third on the queen stage – a summit finish at Thyon – to move up to the same position in the general classification. Caruso took this performance into the Giro d'Italia, where he was due to ride in support of team leader Jack Haig. Caruso ultimately became the best-placed rider for Team Bahrain Victorious, and recorded his second top-five overall finish in three years, with fourth place in the final standings. He also competed at the Vuelta a España, where he made it into the breakaway on four stages and recorded a best stage finish of second place on stage eighteen – however, he was nearly five minutes down on stage winner Remco Evenepoel, describing Evenepoel's performance as "trying to follow a scooter".

== Major results ==
2005
1st Overall Tre Ciclistica Bresciana Junior

1st Stage 2

5th Overall Giro della Lunigiana
2007
4th Overall Giro della Toscana

1st Young rider classification

8th Trofeo Gianfranco Bianchin
9th Trofeo Banca Popolare di Vicenza
2008
1st Road race, National Under-23 Road Championships
3rd Gran Premio Industria e Commercio Artigianato Carnaghese
3rd Gran Premio Città di Camaiore
6th Giro Del Canavese
9th Overall Tour de l'Avenir
9th Trofeo Banca Popolare di Vicenza
10th Road race, UCI Under-23 Road World Championships
2009
1st Overall Giro Delle Pesche Nettarine Di Romagna

1st Stage 5

1st Trofeo Comune di Cafasse
1st Stage 2 Giro Ciclistico d'Italia
4th Trofeo Banca Popolare di Vicenza
10th Road race, UCI Under-23 Road World Championships
2010
5th Overall Giro di Sardegna
5th Giro dell'Appennino
7th Overall Brixia Tour
7th Overall Settimana Internazionale di Coppi e Bartali
10th Overall Giro del Trentino
2011

Voided results from 6 October 2010 to 5 October 2011.

~~4th Overall Giro della Provincia di Reggio Calabria~~
~~6th Gran Premio Città di Camaiore~~

7th Japan Cup
2012
2nd Overall Tour of Britain
8th GP Miguel Induráin
8th Gran Premio Nobili Rubinetterie
9th Giro di Toscana
2013 (1 pro win)
1st Mountains classification, Tour of Beijing
1st Stage 5 Settimana Internazionale di Coppi e Bartali
3rd Overall Tour of Alberta
2014
3rd Overall Tour of Austria
5th Overall Settimana Internazionale di Coppi e Bartali
5th Tre Valli Varesine
6th Overall Tour of Slovenia
9th Overall Vuelta a España
2015
1st Stage 9 (TTT) Tour de France
8th Overall Giro d'Italia
9th Classic Sud-Ardèche
2016
1st Mountains classification, Vuelta a Andalucía
1st Stage 1 (TTT) Tirreno–Adriatico
4th Road race, National Road Championships
5th Overall Tour des Fjords
2017
1st Stage 1 (TTT) Vuelta a España
1st Stage 1 (TTT) Tirreno–Adriatico
2nd Overall Tour de Suisse
4th Road race, National Road Championships
4th Overall Tour du Haut Var
9th Overall Tour La Provence
2018
1st Stage 3 (TTT) Tour de France
2nd Overall Tirreno–Adriatico

1st Stage 1 (TTT)

3rd Team time trial, UCI Road World Championships
5th Overall Critérium du Dauphiné
5th Overall Deutschland Tour
2019
9th Tre Valli Varesine
2020 (1)
1st Circuito de Getxo
10th Road race, UCI Road World Championships
10th Overall Tour de France
2021 (2)
Vuelta a España

1st Stage 9
Held after Stages 9–13

2nd Overall Giro d'Italia

1st Stage 20

7th Overall UAE Tour
9th Overall Tour de Romandie
2022 (3)
1st Overall Giro di Sicilia

1st Points classification
1st Stages 2 & 4

4th Overall Critérium du Dauphiné
6th Overall Tour de Romandie
7th Overall Tirreno–Adriatico
2023
3rd Overall Tour de Romandie
4th Overall Giro d'Italia
7th Overall Vuelta a Andalucía
10th Overall Giro di Sicilia
Combativity award Stage 3 Vuelta a España
2025 (1)
1st Stage 4 Vuelta a Burgos
5th Overall Giro d'Italia
6th Overall Tour of the Alps
2026
9th Overall Giro d'Italia

=== General classification results timeline ===
Grand Tour general classification results
Grand Tour	2011	2012	2013	2014	2015	2016	2017	2018	2019	2020	2021	2022	2023	2024	2025	2026
Giro d'Italia	—	24	19	—	8	—	—	—	23	—	2	—	4	17	5	9
Tour de France	—	—	—	—	53	22	11	20	58	10	—	DNF	—	—	—	
Vuelta a España	74	—	—	9	—	—	109	—	—	—	17	—	19	DNF	—	
Major stage race general classification results
Race	2011	2012	2013	2014	2015	2016	2017	2018	2019	2020	2021	2022	2023	2024	2025	2026
Paris–Nice	—	—	—	14	—	—	—	—	—	DNF	—	—	—	—	—	32
Tirreno–Adriatico	21	—	19	—	14	11	12	2	DNF	—	37	7	14	41	66	—
Volta a Catalunya	—	—	—	—	—	—	—	—	19	NH	—	—	—	19	—	—
Tour of the Basque Country	36	56	—	35	—	56	73	67	—	NH	—	—	—	—	—	—
Tour de Romandie	—	—	—	84	27	13	—	—	—	NH	9	6	3	DNF	—	
Critérium du Dauphiné	—	—	—	DNF	—	21	—	5	—	29	—	4	—	—	—	—
Tour de Suisse	51	—	67	—	—	—	2	—	—	NH	—	—	—	71	—	—

Legend
—	Did not compete
DNF	Did not finish
NH	Not held

== See also ==
- List of doping cases in cycling
- List of sportspeople sanctioned for doping offences
