= 2014 Giro d'Italia, Stage 12 to Stage 21 =

Cycling race stages

The 2014 Giro d'Italia began on 9 May, and stage 21 occurred on 1 June.

Legend
A pink jersey	Denotes the leader of the General classification	A blue jersey	Denotes the leader of the Mountains classification
A red jersey	Denotes the leader of the Points classification	A white jersey	Denotes the leader of the Young rider classification
	s.t. indicates that the rider crossed the finish line in the same group as the one receiving the time above him, and was therefore credited with the same finishing time.		

== Stage 12 ==
22 May 2014 — Barbaresco to Barolo, 41.9 km (26.0 mi), individual time trial (ITT)

Stage 12 result

	Rider	Team	Time
1	Rigoberto Urán (COL)	Omega Pharma–Quick-Step	57' 34"
2	Diego Ulissi (ITA)	Lampre–Merida	+ 1' 17"
3	Cadel Evans (AUS)	BMC Racing Team	+ 1' 34"
4	Rafał Majka (POL)	Tinkoff–Saxo	+ 1' 39"
5	Gianluca Brambilla (ITA)	Omega Pharma–Quick-Step	+ 1' 53"
6	Wout Poels (NED)	Omega Pharma–Quick-Step	+ 2' 00"
7	Wilco Kelderman (NED)	Belkin Pro Cycling	+ 2' 03"
8	Thomas De Gendt (BEL)	Omega Pharma–Quick-Step	+ 2' 07"
9	Domenico Pozzovivo (ITA)	Ag2r–La Mondiale	+ 2' 09"
10	Patrick Gretsch (GER)	Ag2r–La Mondiale	+ 2' 12"

General classification after stage 12

	Rider	Team	Time
1	Rigoberto Urán (COL)	Omega Pharma–Quick-Step	49h 37' 35"
2	Cadel Evans (AUS)	BMC Racing Team	+ 37"
3	Rafał Majka (POL)	Tinkoff–Saxo	+ 1' 52"
4	Domenico Pozzovivo (ITA)	Ag2r–La Mondiale	+ 2' 32"
5	Wilco Kelderman (NED)	Belkin Pro Cycling	+ 2' 50"
6	Nairo Quintana (COL)	Movistar Team	+ 3' 29"
7	Fabio Aru (ITA)	Astana	+ 3' 37"
8	Wout Poels (NED)	Omega Pharma–Quick-Step	+ 4' 06"
9	Steve Morabito (SUI)	BMC Racing Team	+ 4' 20"
10	Robert Kišerlovski (CRO)	Trek Factory Racing	+ 4' 41"

== Stage 13 ==
23 May 2014 — Fossano to Rivarolo Canavese, 157 km (97.6 mi)

Stage 13 result

	Rider	Team	Time
1	Marco Canola (ITA)	Bardiani–CSF	3h 37' 20"
2	Jackson Rodríguez (VEN)	Androni Giocattoli–Venezuela	s.t.
3	Angelo Tulik (FRA)	Team Europcar	s.t.
4	Nacer Bouhanni (FRA)	FDJ.fr	+ 11"
5	Giacomo Nizzolo (ITA)	Trek Factory Racing	+ 11"
6	Elia Viviani (ITA)	Cannondale	+ 11"
7	Luka Mezgec (SLO)	Giant–Shimano	+ 11"
8	Ben Swift (GBR)	Team Sky	+ 11"
9	Tyler Farrar (USA)	Garmin–Sharp	+ 11"
10	Borut Božič (SLO)	Astana	+ 11"

General classification after stage 13

	Rider	Team	Time
1	Rigoberto Urán (COL)	Omega Pharma–Quick-Step	53h 15' 06"
2	Cadel Evans (AUS)	BMC Racing Team	+ 37"
3	Rafał Majka (POL)	Tinkoff–Saxo	+ 1' 52"
4	Domenico Pozzovivo (ITA)	Ag2r–La Mondiale	+ 2' 32"
5	Wilco Kelderman (NED)	Belkin Pro Cycling	+ 2' 50"
6	Nairo Quintana (COL)	Movistar Team	+ 3' 29"
7	Fabio Aru (ITA)	Astana	+ 3' 37"
8	Wout Poels (NED)	Omega Pharma–Quick-Step	+ 4' 06"
9	Steve Morabito (SUI)	BMC Racing Team	+ 4' 20"
10	Robert Kišerlovski (CRO)	Trek Factory Racing	+ 4' 41"

== Stage 14 ==
24 May 2014 — Agliè to Oropa, 164 km (101.9 mi)

Stage 14 result

	Rider	Team	Time
1	Enrico Battaglin (ITA)	Bardiani–CSF	4h 34' 41"
2	Dario Cataldo (ITA)	Team Sky	s.t.
3	Jarlinson Pantano (COL)	Colombia	+ 7"
4	Jan Polanc (SLO)	Lampre–Merida	+ 17"
5	Nicolas Roche (IRL)	Tinkoff–Saxo	+ 22"
6	Albert Timmer (NED)	Giant–Shimano	+ 26"
7	Emanuele Sella (ITA)	Androni Giocattoli–Venezuela	+ 28"
8	Mattia Cattaneo (ITA)	Lampre–Merida	+ 33"
9	Tim Wellens (BEL)	Lotto–Belisol	+ 39"
10	Ivan Santaromita (ITA)	Orica–GreenEDGE	+ 54"

General classification after stage 14

	Rider	Team	Time
1	Rigoberto Urán (COL)	Omega Pharma–Quick-Step	57h 52' 51"
2	Cadel Evans (AUS)	BMC Racing Team	+ 32"
3	Rafał Majka (POL)	Tinkoff–Saxo	+ 1' 35"
4	Domenico Pozzovivo (ITA)	Ag2r–La Mondiale	+ 2' 11"
5	Wilco Kelderman (NED)	Belkin Pro Cycling	+ 2' 33"
6	Nairo Quintana (COL)	Movistar Team	+ 3' 04"
7	Fabio Aru (ITA)	Astana	+ 3' 16"
8	Wout Poels (NED)	Omega Pharma–Quick-Step	+ 4' 01"
9	Pierre Rolland (FRA)	Team Europcar	+ 5' 07"
10	Robert Kišerlovski (CRO)	Trek Factory Racing	+ 5' 13"

== Stage 15 ==
25 May 2014 — Valdengo to Montecampione, 225 km (139.8 mi)

Stage 15 result

	Rider	Team	Time
1	Fabio Aru (ITA)	Astana	5h 33' 06"
2	Fabio Duarte (COL)	Colombia	+ 21"
3	Nairo Quintana (COL)	Movistar Team	+ 22"
4	Pierre Rolland (FRA)	Team Europcar	+ 22"
5	Rigoberto Urán (COL)	Omega Pharma–Quick-Step	+ 42"
6	Rafał Majka (POL)	Tinkoff–Saxo	+ 57"
7	Franco Pellizotti (ITA)	Androni Giocattoli–Venezuela	+ 1' 08"
8	Daniel Moreno (ESP)	Team Katusha	+ 1' 08"
9	Ryder Hesjedal (CAN)	Garmin–Sharp	+ 1' 13"
10	Cadel Evans (AUS)	BMC Racing Team	+ 1' 13"

General classification after stage 15

	Rider	Team	Time
1	Rigoberto Urán (COL)	Omega Pharma–Quick-Step	63h 26' 39"
2	Cadel Evans (AUS)	BMC Racing Team	+ 1' 03"
3	Rafał Majka (POL)	Tinkoff–Saxo	+ 1' 50"
4	Fabio Aru (ITA)	Astana	+ 2' 24"
5	Nairo Quintana (COL)	Movistar Team	+ 2' 40"
6	Domenico Pozzovivo (ITA)	Ag2r–La Mondiale	+ 2' 42"
7	Wilco Kelderman (NED)	Belkin Pro Cycling	+ 3' 04"
8	Pierre Rolland (FRA)	Team Europcar	+ 4' 47"
9	Robert Kišerlovski (CRO)	Trek Factory Racing	+ 5' 44"
10	Wout Poels (NED)	Omega Pharma–Quick-Step	+ 6' 32"

== Stage 16 ==
27 May 2014 — Ponte di Legno to Val Martello–Martelltal, 139 km (86.4 mi)

Stage 16 result

	Rider	Team	Time
1	Nairo Quintana (COL)	Movistar Team	4h 42' 35"
2	Ryder Hesjedal (CAN)	Garmin–Sharp	+ 8"
3	Pierre Rolland (FRA)	Team Europcar	+ 1' 13"
4	Wilco Kelderman (NED)	Belkin Pro Cycling	+ 3' 32"
5	Domenico Pozzovivo (ITA)	Ag2r–La Mondiale	+ 3' 37"
6	Fabio Aru (ITA)	Astana	+ 3' 40"
7	Rafał Majka (POL)	Tinkoff–Saxo	+ 4' 08"
8	Sebastián Henao (COL)	Team Sky	+ 4' 11"
9	Rigoberto Urán (COL)	Omega Pharma–Quick-Step	+ 4' 11"
10	Cadel Evans (AUS)	BMC Racing Team	+ 4' 48"

General classification after stage 16

	Rider	Team	Time
1	Nairo Quintana (COL)	Movistar Team	68h 11' 44"
2	Rigoberto Urán (COL)	Omega Pharma–Quick-Step	+ 1' 41"
3	Cadel Evans (AUS)	BMC Racing Team	+ 3' 21"
4	Pierre Rolland (FRA)	Team Europcar	+ 3' 26"
5	Rafał Majka (POL)	Tinkoff–Saxo	+ 3' 28"
6	Fabio Aru (ITA)	Astana	+ 3' 34"
7	Domenico Pozzovivo (ITA)	Ag2r–La Mondiale	+ 3' 49"
8	Wilco Kelderman (NED)	Belkin Pro Cycling	+ 4' 06"
9	Ryder Hesjedal (CAN)	Garmin–Sharp	+ 4' 16"
10	Robert Kišerlovski (CRO)	Trek Factory Racing	+ 8' 02"

== Stage 17 ==
28 May 2014 — Sarnonico to Vittorio Veneto, 208 km (129.2 mi)

Stage 17 result

	Rider	Team	Time
1	Stefano Pirazzi (ITA)	Bardiani–CSF	4h 38' 11"
2	Tim Wellens (BEL)	Lotto–Belisol	s.t.
3	Jay McCarthy (AUS)	Tinkoff–Saxo	s.t.
4	Thomas De Gendt (BEL)	Omega Pharma–Quick-Step	s.t.
5	Matteo Montaguti (ITA)	Ag2r–La Mondiale	s.t.
6	Jussi Veikkanen (FIN)	FDJ.fr	+ 28"
7	Simon Geschke (GER)	Giant–Shimano	+ 28"
8	Fabio Felline (ITA)	Trek Factory Racing	+ 28"
9	Marco Canola (ITA)	Bardiani–CSF	+ 28"
10	Serge Pauwels (BEL)	Omega Pharma–Quick-Step	+ 28"

General classification after stage 17

	Rider	Team	Time
1	Nairo Quintana (COL)	Movistar Team	73h 05' 31"
2	Rigoberto Urán (COL)	Omega Pharma–Quick-Step	+ 1' 41"
3	Cadel Evans (AUS)	BMC Racing Team	+ 3' 21"
4	Pierre Rolland (FRA)	Team Europcar	+ 3' 26"
5	Rafał Majka (POL)	Tinkoff–Saxo	+ 3' 28"
6	Fabio Aru (ITA)	Astana	+ 3' 34"
7	Domenico Pozzovivo (ITA)	Ag2r–La Mondiale	+ 3' 49"
8	Wilco Kelderman (NED)	Belkin Pro Cycling	+ 4' 06"
9	Ryder Hesjedal (CAN)	Garmin–Sharp	+ 4' 16"
10	Robert Kišerlovski (CRO)	Trek Factory Racing	+ 8' 02"

== Stage 18 ==
29 May 2014 — Belluno to Rifugio Panarotta–Valsugana, 171 km (106.3 mi)

Stage 18 result

	Rider	Team	Time
1	Julián Arredondo (COL)	Trek Factory Racing	4h 49' 51"
2	Fabio Duarte (COL)	Colombia	+ 17"
3	Philip Deignan (IRL)	Team Sky	+ 37"
4	Franco Pellizotti (ITA)	Androni Giocattoli–Venezuela	+ 1' 20"
5	Edoardo Zardini (ITA)	Bardiani–CSF	+ 1' 24"
6	Thomas De Gendt (BEL)	Omega Pharma–Quick-Step	+ 1' 38"
7	Ivan Basso (ITA)	Cannondale	+ 1' 43"
8	Dario Cataldo (ITA)	Team Sky	+ 1' 59"
9	Fabio Aru (ITA)	Astana	+ 2' 43"
10	Nairo Quintana (COL)	Movistar Team	+ 2' 46"

General classification after stage 18

	Rider	Team	Time
1	Nairo Quintana (COL)	Movistar Team	77h 58' 08"
2	Rigoberto Urán (COL)	Omega Pharma–Quick-Step	+ 1' 41"
3	Pierre Rolland (FRA)	Team Europcar	+ 3' 29"
4	Fabio Aru (ITA)	Astana	+ 3' 31"
5	Rafał Majka (POL)	Tinkoff–Saxo	+ 3' 31"
6	Domenico Pozzovivo (ITA)	Ag2r–La Mondiale	+ 3' 52"
7	Ryder Hesjedal (CAN)	Garmin–Sharp	+ 4' 32"
8	Wilco Kelderman (NED)	Belkin Pro Cycling	+ 4' 37"
9	Cadel Evans (AUS)	BMC Racing Team	+ 4' 59"
10	Robert Kišerlovski (CRO)	Trek Factory Racing	+ 8' 33"

== Stage 19 ==
30 May 2014 — Bassano del Grappa to Cima Grappa–Crespano del Grappa, 26.8 km (16.7 mi), individual time trial (ITT)

Stage 19 result

	Rider	Team	Time
1	Nairo Quintana (COL)	Movistar Team	1h 05' 37"
2	Fabio Aru (ITA)	Astana	+ 17"
3	Rigoberto Urán (COL)	Omega Pharma–Quick-Step	+ 1' 26"
4	Pierre Rolland (FRA)	Team Europcar	+ 1' 57"
5	Domenico Pozzovivo (ITA)	Ag2r–La Mondiale	+ 2' 24"
6	Franco Pellizotti (ITA)	Androni Giocattoli–Venezuela	+ 3' 22"
7	Rafał Majka (POL)	Tinkoff–Saxo	+ 3' 28"
8	Sebastián Henao (COL)	Team Sky	+ 3' 48"
9	Tim Wellens (BEL)	Lotto–Belisol	+ 4' 00"
10	Dario Cataldo (ITA)	Team Sky	+ 4' 10"

General classification after stage 19

	Rider	Team	Time
1	Nairo Quintana (COL)	Movistar Team	79h 03' 45"
2	Rigoberto Urán (COL)	Omega Pharma–Quick-Step	+ 3' 07"
3	Fabio Aru (ITA)	Astana	+ 3' 48"
4	Pierre Rolland (FRA)	Team Europcar	+ 5' 26"
5	Domenico Pozzovivo (ITA)	Ag2r–La Mondiale	+ 6' 16"
6	Rafał Majka (POL)	Tinkoff–Saxo	+ 6' 59"
7	Cadel Evans (AUS)	BMC Racing Team	+ 9' 25"
8	Wilco Kelderman (NED)	Belkin Pro Cycling	+ 9' 29"
9	Ryder Hesjedal (CAN)	Garmin–Sharp	+ 10' 11"
10	Robert Kišerlovski (CRO)	Trek Factory Racing	+ 13' 59"

== Stage 20 ==
31 May 2014 — Maniago to Monte Zoncolan, 167 km (103.8 mi)

Stage 20 result

	Rider	Team	Time
1	Michael Rogers (AUS)	Tinkoff–Saxo	4h 41' 55"
2	Franco Pellizotti (ITA)	Androni Giocattoli–Venezuela	+ 38"
3	Francesco Manuel Bongiorno (ITA)	Bardiani–CSF	+ 49"
4	Nicolas Roche (IRE)	Tinkoff–Saxo	+ 1' 35"
5	Brent Bookwalter (USA)	BMC Racing Team	+ 1' 37"
6	Robinson Chalapud (COL)	Colombia	+ 1' 46"
7	Georg Preidler (AUT)	Giant–Shimano	+ 1' 52"
8	Maxime Monfort (BEL)	Lotto–Belisol	+ 2' 12"
9	Dario Cataldo (ITA)	Team Sky	+ 2' 24"
10	Simon Geschke (GER)	Giant–Shimano	+ 2' 37"

General classification after stage 20

	Rider	Team	Time
1	Nairo Quintana (COL)	Movistar Team	83h 50' 25"
2	Rigoberto Urán (COL)	Omega Pharma–Quick-Step	+ 3' 07"
3	Fabio Aru (ITA)	Astana	+ 4' 04"
4	Pierre Rolland (FRA)	Team Europcar	+ 5' 46"
5	Domenico Pozzovivo (ITA)	Ag2r–La Mondiale	+ 6' 41"
6	Rafał Majka (POL)	Tinkoff–Saxo	+ 7' 13"
7	Wilco Kelderman (NED)	Belkin Pro Cycling	+ 11' 09"
8	Cadel Evans (AUS)	BMC Racing Team	+ 12' 00"
9	Ryder Hesjedal (CAN)	Garmin–Sharp	+ 13' 35"
10	Robert Kišerlovski (CRO)	Trek Factory Racing	+ 15' 49"

== Stage 21 ==
1 June 2014 — Gemona del Friuli to Trieste, 172 km (106.9 mi)

Stage 21 result

	Rider	Team	Time
1	Luka Mezgec (SLO)	Giant–Shimano	4h 23' 58"
2	Giacomo Nizzolo (ITA)	Trek Factory Racing	s.t.
3	Tyler Farrar (USA)	Garmin–Sharp	s.t.
4	Nacer Bouhanni (FRA)	FDJ.fr	s.t.
5	Roberto Ferrari (ITA)	Lampre–Merida	s.t.
6	Leonardo Duque (COL)	Colombia	s.t.
7	Luca Paolini (ITA)	Team Katusha	s.t.
8	Tosh Van der Sande (BEL)	Lotto–Belisol	s.t.
9	Borut Božič (SLO)	Astana	s.t.
10	Iljo Keisse (BEL)	Omega Pharma–Quick-Step	s.t.

General classification after stage 21

	Rider	Team	Time
1	Nairo Quintana (COL)	Movistar Team	88h 14' 32"
2	Rigoberto Urán (COL)	Omega Pharma–Quick-Step	+ 2' 58"
3	Fabio Aru (ITA)	Astana	+ 4' 04"
4	Pierre Rolland (FRA)	Team Europcar	+ 5' 46"
5	Domenico Pozzovivo (ITA)	Ag2r–La Mondiale	+ 6' 32"
6	Rafał Majka (POL)	Tinkoff–Saxo	+ 7' 04"
7	Wilco Kelderman (NED)	Belkin Pro Cycling	+ 11' 00"
8	Cadel Evans (AUS)	BMC Racing Team	+ 11' 51"
9	Ryder Hesjedal (CAN)	Garmin–Sharp	+ 13' 35"
10	Robert Kišerlovski (CRO)	Trek Factory Racing	+ 15' 49"
