= 2014 Giro d'Italia =

2014 UCI World Tour, race 16 of 30
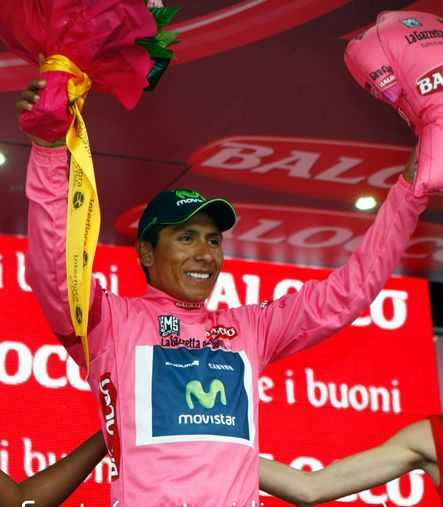
- Nairo Quintana, winner of the 2014 Giro d'Italia

Race details
- Dates: 9 May – 1 June 2014
- Stages: 21
- Distance: 3,445.5 km (2,140.9 mi)

Results
Jersey awarded to the overall winner	Winner	Nairo Quintana (COL)	(Movistar Team)
	Second	Rigoberto Urán (COL)	(Omega Pharma–Quick-Step)
	Third	Fabio Aru (ITA)	(Astana)
Jersey awarded to the points classification winner	Points	Nacer Bouhanni (FRA)	(FDJ.fr)
Jersey awarded to the mountains classification winner	Mountains	Julián Arredondo (COL)	(Trek Factory Racing)
Jersey awarded to the young rider classification winner	Young rider	Nairo Quintana (COL)	(Movistar Team)
	Sprints	Marco Bandiera (ITA)	(Androni Giocattoli–Venezuela)
Jersey awarded to the combativity classification winner	Combativity	Julián Arredondo (COL)	(Trek Factory Racing)
	Team	Ag2r–La Mondiale	
	Team points	Omega Pharma–Quick-Step	

The 2014 Giro d'Italia was the 97th running of the Giro d'Italia, one of cycling's Grand Tour races.

The race started off in Belfast, on 9 May, with a 21.7 km (13.5 mi) team time trial and concluded in Trieste, on 1 June, with a 172 km (106.9 mi) flat stage. A total of 198 riders from 22 teams entered the 21-stage race, which was won by Colombian Nairo Quintana of the Movistar Team team. The second and third places were taken by Colombian Rigoberto Urán and Italian Fabio Aru, respectively.

Quintana became the first Colombian to win the Giro. He won the secondary young rider classification. In the other classifications, FDJ.fr rider Nacer Bouhanni was the winner of the points classification and Trek Factory Racing's Julián Arredondo won the Mountains classification. Ag2r–La Mondiale finished as the winners of the team classification, while Omega Pharma–Quick-Step won the team points classification. This was also the first grand tour where non-Europeans led for the entire race, with a Canadian, two Australians, and two Colombians wearing the Pink jersey.

== Teams ==
All eighteen UCI ProTeams were automatically invited and were obliged to attend the race. As the winners of the 2013 Coppa Italia rankings for Italian teams, Androni Giocattoli–Venezuela were invited to the race in October 2013. In January 2014, the three remaining wildcard places were decided by a vote on social media, from a shortlist of eight UCI Professional Continental teams. The places were later awarded to the Bardiani–CSF, Colombia and Neri Sottoli squads.

The 22 teams that competed in the race were:

- Ag2r–La Mondiale
- Androni Giocattoli–Venezuela*
- Astana
- Bardiani–CSF*
- Belkin Pro Cycling
- BMC Racing Team
- Cannondale
- Colombia*
- Team Europcar
- FDJ.fr
- Garmin–Sharp
- Giant–Shimano
- Team Katusha
- Lampre–Merida
- Lotto–Belisol
- Movistar Team
- Neri Sottoli*
- Omega Pharma–Quick-Step
- Orica–GreenEDGE
- Team Sky
- Tinkoff–Saxo
- Trek Factory Racing

*: Marked UCI Professional Continental teams given wild card entry to this event.

== Pre-race favourites ==
Before the start of a race, Nairo Quintana, Joaquim Rodríguez, Cadel Evans, Rigoberto Urán were among the main favourites for overall victory. Other possible contenders were Domenico Pozzovivo, Michele Scarponi, Dan Martin, Ivan Basso, Rafał Majka and Przemysław Niemiec.

== Stages ==
The 2014 Giro has its stages categorized into five different categories, named A to E. The category of a stage determines the points given for the points classification, and for the maximum time allowed for cyclists to finish the stage. Category A is reserved for the flattest stages, while category D is for the stages with the highest mountains. Category E is for time-trial stages.

It started in Belfast on 9 May 2014 and traveled across both Northern Ireland and the Republic of Ireland. There were three rest days instead of the usual two and the race started on a Friday.

List of stages
Stage	Date	Course	Distance	Type	Winner
1	9 May	Belfast (Northern Ireland) – Belfast (Northern Ireland)	21.7 km (13 mi)	E (Team time trial)	Orica–GreenEDGE
2	10 May	Belfast (Northern Ireland) – Belfast (Northern Ireland)	219 km (136 mi)	A (Very flat stage)	Marcel Kittel (GER)
3	11 May	Armagh (Northern Ireland) – Dublin (Ireland)	187 km (116 mi)	A (Very flat stage)	Marcel Kittel (GER)
	12 May	Rest day			
4	13 May	Giovinazzo – Bari	112 km (70 mi)	A (Very flat stage)	Nacer Bouhanni (FRA)
5	14 May	Taranto – Viggiano	203 km (126 mi)	C (Medium-mountain stage)	Diego Ulissi (ITA)
6	15 May	Sassano – Montecassino	257 km (160 mi)	C (Medium-mountain stage)	Michael Matthews (AUS)
7	16 May	Frosinone – Foligno	211 km (131 mi)	B (Flat stage)	Nacer Bouhanni (FRA)
8	17 May	Foligno – Montecopiolo	179 km (111 mi)	D (Mountain stage)	Diego Ulissi (ITA)
9	18 May	Lugo – Sestola	172 km (107 mi)	C (Medium-mountain stage)	Pieter Weening (NED)
	19 May	Rest day			
10	20 May	Modena – Salsomaggiore Terme	173 km (107 mi)	A (Very flat stage)	Nacer Bouhanni (FRA)
11	21 May	Collecchio – Savona	249 km (155 mi)	C (Medium-mountain stage)	Michael Rogers (AUS)
12	22 May	Barbaresco – Barolo	41.9 km (26 mi)	E (Individual time trial)	Rigoberto Urán (COL)
13	23 May	Fossano – Rivarolo Canavese	157 km (98 mi)	A (Very flat stage)	Marco Canola (ITA)
14	24 May	Agliè – Oropa	164 km (102 mi)	D (Mountain stage)	Enrico Battaglin (ITA)
15	25 May	Valdengo – Montecampione	225 km (140 mi)	D (Mountain stage)	Fabio Aru (ITA)
	26 May	Rest day			
16	27 May	Ponte di Legno – Val Martello (Martelltal)	139 km (86 mi)	D (Mountain stage)	Nairo Quintana (COL)
17	28 May	Sarnonico – Vittorio Veneto	208 km (129 mi)	B (Flat stage)	Stefano Pirazzi (ITA)
18	29 May	Belluno – Rifugio Panarotta (Valsugana)	171 km (106 mi)	D (Mountain stage)	Julián Arredondo (COL)
19	30 May	Bassano del Grappa – Cima Grappa (Crespano del Grappa)	26.8 km (17 mi)	E (Individual time trial)	Nairo Quintana (COL)
20	31 May	Maniago – Monte Zoncolan	167 km (104 mi)	D (Mountain stage)	Michael Rogers (AUS)
21	1 June	Gemona del Friuli – Trieste	172 km (107 mi)	A (Very flat stage)	Luka Mezgec (SLO)

== Classification leadership ==
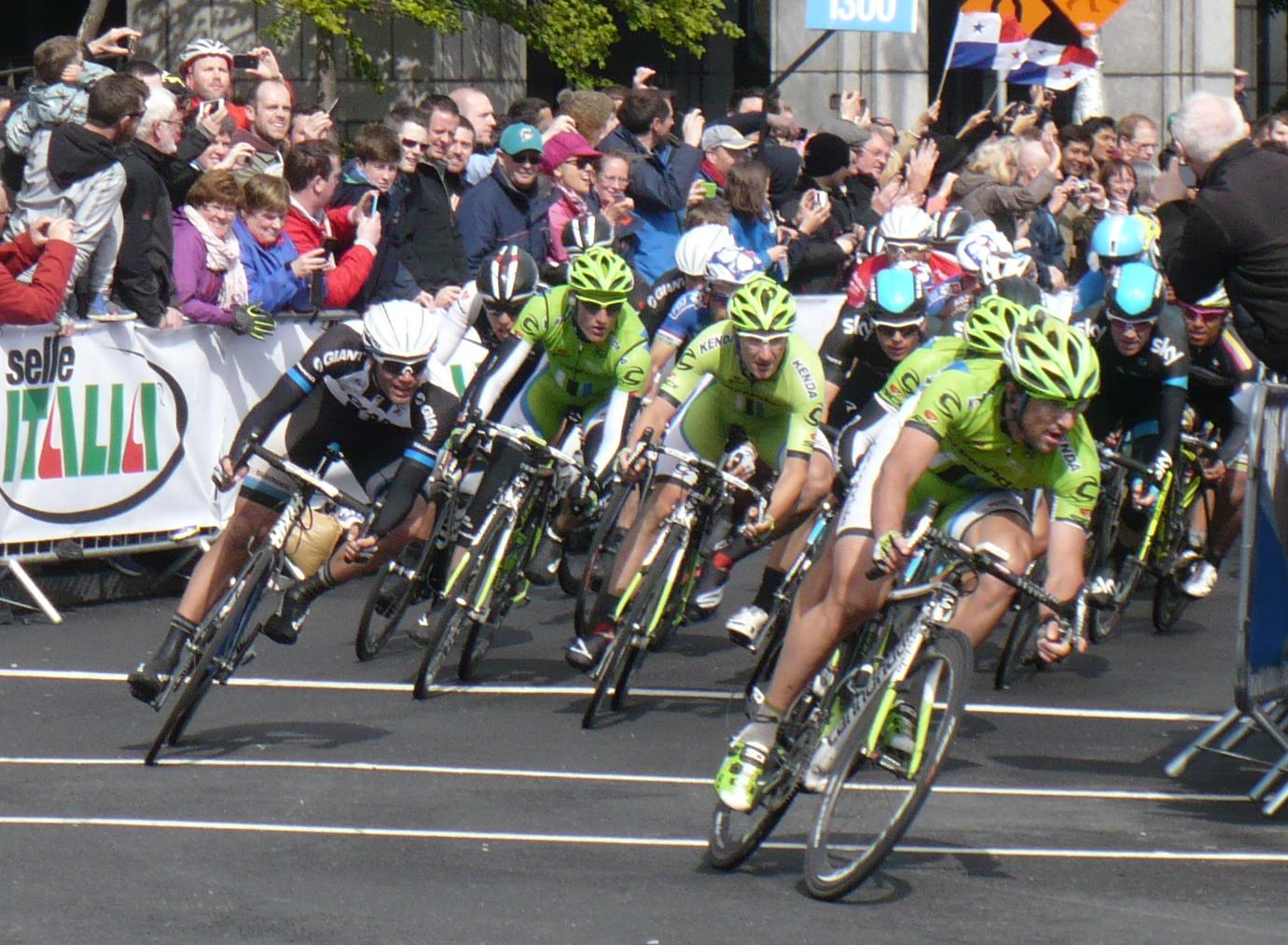
Head of the peloton in Dublin (stage 3)

In the 2014 Giro d'Italia, four different jerseys were awarded. For the general classification, calculated by adding each cyclist's finishing times on each stage, and allowing time bonuses (10, 6 and 4 seconds respectively) for the first three finishers on mass-start stages, the leader received a pink jersey. This classification is considered the most important of the Giro d'Italia, and the winner is considered the winner of the Giro.

Additionally, there was a points classification, awarding a red jersey. In the points classification, cyclists received points for finishing in the top 15 in a stage. Unlike in the better known points classification in the Tour de France, the type of stage has no effect on what points were on offer – each stage had the same points available on the same scale. The winner earned 25 points, second place earned 20 points, third 16, fourth 14, fifth 12, sixth 10, and one point fewer per place down to a single point for 15th. In addition, points could be won in intermediate sprints.

There was a mountains classification, the leadership of which was marked by a blue jersey. In the mountains classifications, points were won by reaching the top of a climb before other cyclists. Each climb was categorized as either first, second, third, or fourth-category, with more points available for the higher-categorized climbs. The Cima Coppi, the race's highest point of elevation, was worth still more points than the other first-category climbs. The fourth jersey represents the young rider classification, marked by a white jersey. This was decided the same way as the general classification, but only riders born after 1 January 1989 were eligible.

There were two classifications for teams. In the Trofeo Fast Team classification, the times of the best three cyclists per team on each stage were added; the leading team was the team with the lowest total time; the Trofeo Super Team was a team points classification, with the top 20 placed riders on each stage earning points (20 for first place, 19 for second place and so on, down to a single point for 20th) for their team.

The rows in the following table correspond to the jerseys awarded after that stage was run.

Stage	Winner	General classification	Points classification	Mountains classification	Young rider classification	Trofeo Fast Team	Trofeo Super Team
1	Orica–GreenEDGE	Svein Tuft	not awarded	not awarded	Luke Durbridge	Orica–GreenEDGE	Orica–GreenEDGE
2	Marcel Kittel	Michael Matthews	Marcel Kittel	Maarten Tjallingii	Michael Matthews	Orica–GreenEDGE	Orica–GreenEDGE
3	Marcel Kittel	Michael Matthews	Marcel Kittel	Maarten Tjallingii	Michael Matthews	Orica–GreenEDGE	Team Sky
4	Nacer Bouhanni	Michael Matthews	Nacer Bouhanni	Maarten Tjallingii	Michael Matthews	Orica–GreenEDGE	Giant–Shimano
5	Diego Ulissi	Michael Matthews	Elia Viviani	Maarten Tjallingii	Michael Matthews	Astana	Giant–Shimano
6	Michael Matthews	Michael Matthews	Elia Viviani	Michael Matthews	Michael Matthews	BMC Racing Team	Giant–Shimano
7	Nacer Bouhanni	Michael Matthews	Nacer Bouhanni	Michael Matthews	Michael Matthews	BMC Racing Team	Giant–Shimano
8	Diego Ulissi	Cadel Evans	Nacer Bouhanni	Julián Arredondo	Rafał Majka	BMC Racing Team	Trek Factory Racing
9	Pieter Weening	Cadel Evans	Nacer Bouhanni	Julián Arredondo	Rafał Majka	Omega Pharma–Quick-Step	Lampre–Merida
10	Nacer Bouhanni	Cadel Evans	Nacer Bouhanni	Julián Arredondo	Rafał Majka	Omega Pharma–Quick-Step	Lampre–Merida
11	Michael Rogers	Cadel Evans	Nacer Bouhanni	Julián Arredondo	Rafał Majka	Omega Pharma–Quick-Step	Lampre–Merida
12	Rigoberto Urán	Rigoberto Urán	Nacer Bouhanni	Julián Arredondo	Rafał Majka	Omega Pharma–Quick-Step	Lampre–Merida
13	Marco Canola	Rigoberto Urán	Nacer Bouhanni	Julián Arredondo	Rafał Majka	Omega Pharma–Quick-Step	Lampre–Merida
14	Enrico Battaglin	Rigoberto Urán	Nacer Bouhanni	Julián Arredondo	Rafał Majka	Omega Pharma–Quick-Step	Lampre–Merida
15	Fabio Aru	Rigoberto Urán	Nacer Bouhanni	Julián Arredondo	Rafał Majka	Omega Pharma–Quick-Step	Lampre–Merida
16	Nairo Quintana	Nairo Quintana	Nacer Bouhanni	Julián Arredondo	Nairo Quintana	Ag2r–La Mondiale	Lampre–Merida
17	Stefano Pirazzi	Nairo Quintana	Nacer Bouhanni	Julián Arredondo	Nairo Quintana	Ag2r–La Mondiale	Omega Pharma–Quick-Step
18	Julián Arredondo	Nairo Quintana	Nacer Bouhanni	Julián Arredondo	Nairo Quintana	Ag2r–La Mondiale	Omega Pharma–Quick-Step
19	Nairo Quintana	Nairo Quintana	Nacer Bouhanni	Julián Arredondo	Nairo Quintana	Ag2r–La Mondiale	Omega Pharma–Quick-Step
20	Michael Rogers	Nairo Quintana	Nacer Bouhanni	Julián Arredondo	Nairo Quintana	Ag2r–La Mondiale	Omega Pharma–Quick-Step
21	Luka Mezgec	Nairo Quintana	Nacer Bouhanni	Julián Arredondo	Nairo Quintana	Ag2r–La Mondiale	Omega Pharma–Quick-Step
Final		Nairo Quintana	Nacer Bouhanni	Julián Arredondo	Nairo Quintana	Ag2r–La Mondiale	Omega Pharma–Quick-Step

Notes

- In stages 3, 4, and 5, Luke Durbridge, who was second in the young riders classification, wore the white jersey, because Michael Matthews (in first place) wore the pink jersey as leader of the general classification during that stage.
- In stage 4, no rider wore the red jersey after Marcel Kittel, who was first in the points classification, withdrew from the race.
- In stages 6, 7, and 8, Rafał Majka, who was second in the young riders classification, wore the white jersey, because Michael Matthews (in first place) wore the pink jersey as leader of the general classification during that stage.
- In stages 7 and 8, Maarten Tjallingii, who was second in the mountains classification, wore the blue jersey, because Michael Matthews (in first place) wore the pink jersey as leader of the general classification during that stage.
- In stage 17 and 18, Rafał Majka, who was second in the young riders classification, wore the white jersey, because Nairo Quintana (in first place) wore the pink jersey as leader of the general classification during that stage.
- In stages 19, 20, and 21, Fabio Aru, who was second in the young riders classification, wore the white jersey, because Nairo Quintana (in first place) wore the pink jersey as leader of the general classification during that stage.

== Final standings ==
Legend
Pink jersey	Denotes the leader of the General classification	Green jersey	Denotes the leader of the Mountains classification
Red jersey	Denotes the leader of the Points classification	White jersey	Denotes the leader of the Young rider classification

=== General classification ===
	Rider	Team	Time
1	Nairo Quintana (COL)	Movistar Team	88h 14' 32"
2	Rigoberto Urán (COL)	Omega Pharma–Quick-Step	+ 2' 58"
3	Fabio Aru (ITA)	Astana	+ 4' 04"
4	Pierre Rolland (FRA)	Team Europcar	+ 5' 46"
5	Domenico Pozzovivo (ITA)	Ag2r–La Mondiale	+ 6' 32"
6	Rafał Majka (POL)	Tinkoff–Saxo	+ 7' 04"
7	Wilco Kelderman (NED)	Belkin Pro Cycling	+ 11' 00"
8	Cadel Evans (AUS)	BMC Racing Team	+ 11' 51"
9	Ryder Hesjedal (CAN)	Garmin–Sharp	+ 13' 35"
10	Robert Kišerlovski (CRO)	Trek Factory Racing	+ 15' 49"

=== Points classification ===
	Rider	Team	Points
1	Nacer Bouhanni (FRA)	FDJ.fr	291
2	Giacomo Nizzolo (ITA)	Trek Factory Racing	265
3	Roberto Ferrari (ITA)	Lampre–Merida	186
4	Elia Viviani (ITA)	Cannondale	174
5	Ben Swift (GBR)	Team Sky	135
6	Luka Mezgec (SLO)	Giant–Shimano	128
7	Enrico Battaglin (ITA)	Bardiani–CSF	108
8	Tyler Farrar (USA)	Garmin–Sharp	103
9	Cadel Evans (AUS)	BMC Racing Team	96
10	Tim Wellens (BEL)	Lotto–Belisol	94

=== Mountains classification ===
	Rider	Team	Points
1	Julián Arredondo (COL)	Trek Factory Racing	173
2	Dario Cataldo (ITA)	Team Sky	132
3	Nairo Quintana (COL)	Movistar Team	88
4	Tim Wellens (BEL)	Lotto–Belisol	79
5	Robinson Chalapud (COL)	Colombia	73
6	Jonathan Monsalve (VEN)	Neri Sottoli	68
7	Fabio Aru (ITA)	Astana	57
8	Pierre Rolland (FRA)	Team Europcar	46
9	Jarlinson Pantano (COL)	Colombia	43
10	Franco Pellizotti (ITA)	Androni Giocattoli–Venezuela	42

=== Young riders classification ===
	Rider	Team	Time
1	Nairo Quintana (COL)	Movistar Team	88h 14' 32"
2	Fabio Aru (ITA)	Astana	+ 4' 04"
3	Rafał Majka (POL)	Tinkoff–Saxo	+ 7' 04"
4	Wilco Kelderman (NED)	Belkin Pro Cycling	+ 11' 00"
5	Sebastián Henao (COL)	Team Sky	+ 56' 24"
6	Georg Preidler (AUT)	Giant–Shimano	+ 1h 05' 03"
7	Mikel Landa (ESP)	Astana	+ 1h 23' 06"
8	Marc Goos (NED)	Belkin Pro Cycling	+ 1h 30' 43"
9	Jan Polanc (SLO)	Lampre–Merida	+ 1h 45' 31"
10	Paweł Poljański (POL)	Tinkoff–Saxo	+ 2h 04' 29"

=== Trofeo Fast Team classification ===
	Team	Time
1	(France) Ag2r–La Mondiale	264h 30' 55"
2	(Belgium) Omega Pharma–Quick-Step	+ 19' 32"
3	(Russia) Tinkoff–Saxo	+ 27' 12"
4	(United States) BMC Racing Team	+ 1h 08' 24"
5	(Spain) Movistar Team	+ 1h 13' 52"
6	(Kazakhstan) Astana	+ 1h 26' 51"
7	(United Kingdom) Team Sky	+ 1h 28' 05"
8	(Italy) Lampre–Merida	+ 1h 47' 02"
9	(France) Team Europcar	+ 2h 04' 31"
10	(United States) Trek Factory Racing	+ 2h 14' 58"

=== Trofeo Super Team classification ===
	Team	Points
1	(Belgium) Omega Pharma–Quick-Step	327
2	(Italy) Bardiani–CSF	303
3	(United States) Trek Factory Racing	294
4	(United Kingdom) Team Sky	294
5	(France) Ag2r–La Mondiale	285
6	(Italy) Lampre–Merida	280
7	(Netherlands) Giant–Shimano	278
8	(Russia) Tinkoff–Saxo	262
9	(Italy) Androni Giocattoli–Venezuela	224
10	(United States) BMC Racing Team	211

=== Minor classifications ===
Other less well-known classifications, whose leaders do not receive a special jersey, were awarded during the Giro. These awards are based on points earned throughout the three weeks of the tour. Each mass-start stage has one intermediate sprint, the Traguardi Volante, or T.V. The T.V. sprints give bonus seconds towards the general classification, points towards the regular points classification, and also points towards the T.V. classification. This award was known by various names in previous years, and was previously time-based. It was won by Italian Marco Bandiera. The Premio della Fuga, rewards riders who take part in breakaways at the head of the field. Each rider in an escape of ten or fewer riders receives one point for each kilometre that the group stayed clear. Andrea Fedi won this classification.

Other awards include the Fighting Spirit (Combativity classification), which is a compilation of points gained for position on crossing intermediate sprints, mountain passes and stage finishes. This classification was won by Julián Arredondo. The Azzurri d'Italia classification is based on finishing order, but points were awarded only to the top three finishers in each stage. It was won by Frenchman Nacer Bouhanni. Teams take part in the Fair Play classification where teams are given penalty points for minor technical infringements. This was won by Cannondale. A new classification, the Energy Prize classification was introduced this year and awarded points to the rider with the fastest time in those last 3 km gets 4 points, the second 2 points and the third one point. The first winner of this was Enrico Battaglin.
