= 2014 Giro d'Italia, Stage 1 to Stage 11 =

Cycling race stages

The 2014 Giro d'Italia began on 9 May, and stage 11 occurred on 21 May. The 2014 edition began with a team time trial in Belfast. The first three stage of the Giro began in Northern Ireland, while the Giro returned to Italy on 13 May, after the first rest day.

Legend
A pink jersey	Denotes the leader of the General classification	A blue jersey	Denotes the leader of the Mountains classification
A red jersey	Denotes the leader of the Points classification	A white jersey	Denotes the leader of the Young rider classification
	s.t. indicates that the rider crossed the finish line in the same group as the one receiving the time above him, and was therefore credited with the same finishing time.		

== Stage 1 ==
9 May 2014 — Belfast (Northern Ireland), 21.7 km (13.5 mi), team time trial (TTT)

Stage 1 result

	Team	Time
1	Orica–GreenEDGE	24' 42"
2	Omega Pharma–Quick-Step	+ 5"
3	BMC Racing Team	+ 7"
4	Tinkoff–Saxo	+ 23"
5	Team Sky	+ 35"
6	Astana	+ 38"
7	Cannondale	+ 53"
8	Movistar Team	+ 55"
9	Giant–Shimano	+ 56"
10	Ag2r–La Mondiale	+ 58"

General classification after stage 1

	Rider	Team	Time
1	Svein Tuft (CAN)	Orica–GreenEDGE	24' 42"
2	Luke Durbridge (AUS)	Orica–GreenEDGE	+ 0"
3	Pieter Weening (NED)	Orica–GreenEDGE	+ 0"
4	Cameron Meyer (AUS)	Orica–GreenEDGE	+ 0"
5	Michael Matthews (AUS)	Orica–GreenEDGE	+ 0"
6	Ivan Santaromita (ITA)	Orica–GreenEDGE	+ 0"
7	Pieter Serry (BEL)	Omega Pharma–Quick-Step	+ 5"
8	Gianluca Brambilla (ITA)	Omega Pharma–Quick-Step	+ 5"
9	Rigoberto Urán (COL)	Omega Pharma–Quick-Step	+ 5"
10	Serge Pauwels (BEL)	Omega Pharma–Quick-Step	+ 5"

== Stage 2 ==
10 May 2014 — Belfast (Northern Ireland) to Belfast (Northern Ireland), 219 km (136.1 mi)

Stage 2 result

	Rider	Team	Time
1	Marcel Kittel (GER)	Giant–Shimano	5h 13' 12"
2	Nacer Bouhanni (FRA)	FDJ.fr	s.t.
3	Giacomo Nizzolo (ITA)	Trek Factory Racing	s.t.
4	Elia Viviani (ITA)	Cannondale	s.t.
5	Roberto Ferrari (ITA)	Lampre–Merida	s.t.
6	Manuel Belletti (ITA)	Androni Giocattoli–Venezuela	s.t.
7	Ben Swift (GBR)	Team Sky	s.t.
8	Michael Matthews (AUS)	Orica–GreenEDGE	s.t.
9	Davide Appollonio (ITA)	Ag2r–La Mondiale	s.t.
10	Tyler Farrar (USA)	Garmin–Sharp	s.t.

General classification after stage 2

	Rider	Team	Time
1	Michael Matthews (AUS)	Orica–GreenEDGE	5h 37' 54"
2	Luke Durbridge (AUS)	Orica–GreenEDGE	+ 3"
3	Ivan Santaromita (ITA)	Orica–GreenEDGE	+ 3"
4	Svein Tuft (CAN)	Orica–GreenEDGE	+ 3"
5	Pieter Weening (NED)	Orica–GreenEDGE	+ 3"
6	Cameron Meyer (AUS)	Orica–GreenEDGE	+ 3"
7	Rigoberto Urán (COL)	Omega Pharma–Quick-Step	+ 8"
8	Gianluca Brambilla (ITA)	Omega Pharma–Quick-Step	+ 8"
9	Pieter Serry (BEL)	Omega Pharma–Quick-Step	+ 8"
10	Alessandro Petacchi (ITA)	Omega Pharma–Quick-Step	+ 8"

== Stage 3 ==
11 May 2014 — Armagh (Northern Ireland) to Dublin (Republic of Ireland), 187 km (116.2 mi)

Stage 3 result

	Rider	Team	Time
1	Marcel Kittel (GER)	Giant–Shimano	4h 28' 43"
2	Ben Swift (GBR)	Team Sky	s.t.
3	Elia Viviani (ITA)	Cannondale	s.t.
4	Davide Appollonio (ITA)	Ag2r–La Mondiale	s.t.
5	Nacer Bouhanni (FRA)	FDJ.fr	s.t.
6	Edvald Boasson Hagen (NOR)	Team Sky	s.t.
7	Roberto Ferrari (ITA)	Lampre–Merida	s.t.
8	Edwin Ávila (COL)	Colombia	s.t.
9	Giacomo Nizzolo (ITA)	Trek Factory Racing	s.t.
10	Tyler Farrar (USA)	Garmin–Sharp	s.t.

General classification after stage 3

	Rider	Team	Time
1	Michael Matthews (AUS)	Orica–GreenEDGE	10h 06' 37"
2	Alessandro Petacchi (ITA)	Omega Pharma–Quick-Step	+ 8"
3	Daniel Oss (ITA)	BMC Racing Team	+ 10"
4	Luke Durbridge (AUS)	Orica–GreenEDGE	+ 14"
5	Ivan Santaromita (ITA)	Orica–GreenEDGE	+ 14"
6	Svein Tuft (CAN)	Orica–GreenEDGE	+ 14"
7	Pieter Weening (NED)	Orica–GreenEDGE	+ 14"
8	Rigoberto Urán (COL)	Omega Pharma–Quick-Step	+ 19"
9	Pieter Serry (BEL)	Omega Pharma–Quick-Step	+ 19"
10	Serge Pauwels (BEL)	Omega Pharma–Quick-Step	+ 19"

== Stage 4 ==
13 May 2014 — Giovinazzo to Bari, 112 km (69.6 mi)

Stage 4 result

	Rider	Team	Time
1	Nacer Bouhanni (FRA)	FDJ.fr	2h 22' 06"
2	Giacomo Nizzolo (ITA)	Trek Factory Racing	s.t.
3	Tom Veelers (NED)	Giant–Shimano	s.t.
4	Roberto Ferrari (ITA)	Lampre–Merida	s.t.
5	Elia Viviani (ITA)	Cannondale	s.t.
6	Matteo Montaguti (ITA)	Ag2r–La Mondiale	s.t.
7	Kenny Dehaes (BEL)	Lotto–Belisol	s.t.
8	Luka Mezgec (SLO)	Giant–Shimano	s.t.
9	Bert De Backer (BEL)	Giant–Shimano	s.t.
10	Francesco Chicchi (ITA)	Neri Sottoli	s.t.

General classification after stage 4

	Rider	Team	Time
1	Michael Matthews (AUS)	Orica–GreenEDGE	12h 28' 43"
2	Alessandro Petacchi (ITA)	Omega Pharma–Quick-Step	+ 8"
3	Daniel Oss (ITA)	BMC Racing Team	+ 10"
4	Ivan Santaromita (ITA)	Orica–GreenEDGE	+ 14"
5	Pieter Weening (NED)	Orica–GreenEDGE	+ 14"
6	Luke Durbridge (AUS)	Orica–GreenEDGE	+ 14"
7	Svein Tuft (CAN)	Orica–GreenEDGE	+ 14"
8	Serge Pauwels (BEL)	Omega Pharma–Quick-Step	+ 19"
9	Rigoberto Urán (COL)	Omega Pharma–Quick-Step	+ 19"
10	Julien Vermote (BEL)	Omega Pharma–Quick-Step	+ 19"

== Stage 5 ==
14 May 2014 — Taranto to Viggiano, 203 km (126.1 mi)

Stage 5 result

	Rider	Team	Time
1	Diego Ulissi (ITA)	Lampre–Merida	5h 12' 39"
2	Cadel Evans (AUS)	BMC Racing Team	+ 1"
3	Julián Arredondo (COL)	Trek Factory Racing	+ 1"
4	Rigoberto Urán (COL)	Omega Pharma–Quick-Step	+ 1"
5	Rafał Majka (POL)	Tinkoff–Saxo	+ 1"
6	Michael Matthews (AUS)	Orica–GreenEDGE	+ 1"
7	Joaquim Rodríguez (ESP)	Team Katusha	+ 1"
8	Wilco Kelderman (NED)	Belkin Pro Cycling	+ 1"
9	Domenico Pozzovivo (ITA)	Ag2r–La Mondiale	+ 1"
10	Nairo Quintana (COL)	Movistar Team	+ 1"

General classification after stage 5

	Rider	Team	Time
1	Michael Matthews (AUS)	Orica–GreenEDGE	17h 41' 23"
2	Pieter Weening (NED)	Orica–GreenEDGE	+ 14"
3	Cadel Evans (AUS)	BMC Racing Team	+ 15"
4	Rigoberto Urán (COL)	Omega Pharma–Quick-Step	+ 19"
5	Rafał Majka (POL)	Tinkoff–Saxo	+ 26"
6	Edvald Boasson Hagen (NOR)	Team Sky	+ 35"
7	Nicolas Roche (IRL)	Tinkoff–Saxo	+ 37"
8	Michele Scarponi (ITA)	Astana	+ 41"
9	Dario Cataldo (ITA)	Team Sky	+ 49"
10	Fabio Aru (ITA)	Astana	+ 52"

== Stage 6 ==
15 May 2014 — Sassano to Montecassino, 257 km (159.7 mi)

Due to an uncleared landslide in the town of Polla, the stage was lengthened from its original itinerary of 247 km (153.5 mi), to a 257 km (159.7 mi) distance.

Stage 6 result

	Rider	Team	Time
1	Michael Matthews (AUS)	Orica–GreenEDGE	6h 37' 01"
2	Tim Wellens (BEL)	Lotto–Belisol	s.t.
3	Cadel Evans (AUS)	BMC Racing Team	s.t.
4	Matteo Rabottini (ITA)	Neri Sottoli	s.t.
5	Ivan Santaromita (ITA)	Orica–GreenEDGE	+ 13"
6	Steve Morabito (SUI)	BMC Racing Team	+ 23"
7	Wilco Kelderman (NED)	Belkin Pro Cycling	+ 49"
8	Mauro Finetto (ITA)	Neri Sottoli	+ 49"
9	Diego Ulissi (ITA)	Lampre–Merida	+ 49"
10	Fabio Duarte (COL)	Colombia	+ 49"

General classification after stage 6

	Rider	Team	Time
1	Michael Matthews (AUS)	Orica–GreenEDGE	24h 18' 14"
2	Cadel Evans (AUS)	BMC Racing Team	+ 21"
3	Rigoberto Urán (COL)	Omega Pharma–Quick-Step	+ 1' 18"
4	Rafał Majka (POL)	Tinkoff–Saxo	+ 1' 25"
5	Steve Morabito (SUI)	BMC Racing Team	+ 1' 25"
6	Matteo Rabottini (ITA)	Neri Sottoli	+ 1' 25"
7	Ivan Santaromita (ITA)	Orica–GreenEDGE	+ 1' 47"
8	Fabio Aru (ITA)	Astana	+ 1' 51"
9	Tim Wellens (BEL)	Lotto–Belisol	+ 1' 52"
10	Ivan Basso (ITA)	Cannondale	+ 2' 06"

== Stage 7 ==
16 May 2014 — Frosinone to Foligno, 211 km (131.1 mi)

Stage 7 result

	Rider	Team	Time
1	Nacer Bouhanni (FRA)	FDJ.fr	5h 16' 05"
2	Giacomo Nizzolo (ITA)	Trek Factory Racing	s.t.
3	Luka Mezgec (SLO)	Giant–Shimano	s.t.
4	Michael Matthews (AUS)	Orica–GreenEDGE	s.t.
5	Roberto Ferrari (ITA)	Lampre–Merida	s.t.
6	Tyler Farrar (USA)	Garmin–Sharp	s.t.
7	Enrico Battaglin (ITA)	Bardiani–CSF	s.t.
8	Boy van Poppel (NED)	Trek Factory Racing	s.t.
9	Ivan Rovny (RUS)	Tinkoff–Saxo	s.t.
10	Elia Viviani (ITA)	Cannondale	s.t.

General classification after stage 7

	Rider	Team	Time
1	Michael Matthews (AUS)	Orica–GreenEDGE	29h 34' 19"
2	Cadel Evans (AUS)	BMC Racing Team	+ 21"
3	Rigoberto Urán (COL)	Omega Pharma–Quick-Step	+ 1' 18"
4	Rafał Majka (POL)	Tinkoff–Saxo	+ 1' 25"
5	Steve Morabito (SUI)	BMC Racing Team	+ 1' 25"
6	Matteo Rabottini (ITA)	Neri Sottoli	+ 1' 25"
7	Ivan Santaromita (ITA)	Orica–GreenEDGE	+ 1' 47"
8	Fabio Aru (ITA)	Astana	+ 1' 51"
9	Tim Wellens (BEL)	Lotto–Belisol	+ 1' 52"
10	Ivan Basso (ITA)	Cannondale	+ 2' 06"

== Stage 8 ==
17 May 2014 — Foligno to Montecopiolo, 179 km (111.2 mi)

Stage 8 result

	Rider	Team	Time
1	Diego Ulissi (ITA)	Lampre–Merida	4h 47' 47"
2	Robert Kišerlovski (CRO)	Trek Factory Racing	s.t.
3	Wilco Kelderman (NED)	Belkin Pro Cycling	+ 6"
4	Nairo Quintana (COL)	Movistar Team	+ 6"
5	Cadel Evans (AUS)	BMC Racing Team	+ 8"
6	Rigoberto Urán (COL)	Omega Pharma–Quick-Step	+ 8"
7	Domenico Pozzovivo (ITA)	Ag2r–La Mondiale	+ 8"
8	Rafał Majka (POL)	Tinkoff–Saxo	+ 14"
9	Fabio Aru (ITA)	Astana	+ 17"
10	Ryder Hesjedal (CAN)	Garmin–Sharp	+ 20"

General classification after stage 8

	Rider	Team	Time
1	Cadel Evans (AUS)	BMC Racing Team	34h 22' 35"
2	Rigoberto Urán (COL)	Omega Pharma–Quick-Step	+ 57"
3	Rafał Majka (POL)	Tinkoff–Saxo	+ 1' 10"
4	Steve Morabito (SUI)	BMC Racing Team	+ 1' 31"
5	Fabio Aru (ITA)	Astana	+ 1' 39"
6	Diego Ulissi (ITA)	Lampre–Merida	+ 1' 43"
7	Wilco Kelderman (NED)	Belkin Pro Cycling	+ 1' 44"
8	Nairo Quintana (COL)	Movistar Team	+ 1' 45"
9	Robert Kišerlovski (CRO)	Trek Factory Racing	+ 1' 49"
10	Domenico Pozzovivo (ITA)	Ag2r–La Mondiale	+ 1' 50"

== Stage 9 ==
18 May 2014 — Lugo to Sestola, 172 km (106.9 mi)

Stage 9 result

	Rider	Team	Time
1	Pieter Weening (NED)	Orica–GreenEDGE	4h 25' 51"
2	Davide Malacarne (ITA)	Team Europcar	s.t.
3	Domenico Pozzovivo (ITA)	Ag2r–La Mondiale	+ 42"
4	Diego Ulissi (ITA)	Lampre–Merida	+ 1' 08"
5	Rigoberto Urán (COL)	Omega Pharma–Quick-Step	+ 1' 08"
6	Wilco Kelderman (NED)	Belkin Pro Cycling	+ 1' 08"
7	Cadel Evans (AUS)	BMC Racing Team	+ 1' 08"
8	Dario Cataldo (ITA)	Team Sky	+ 1' 08"
9	Rafał Majka (POL)	Tinkoff–Saxo	+ 1' 08"
10	Fabio Duarte (COL)	Colombia	+ 1' 08"

General classification after stage 9

	Rider	Team	Time
1	Cadel Evans (AUS)	BMC Racing Team	38h 49' 34"
2	Rigoberto Urán (COL)	Omega Pharma–Quick-Step	+ 57"
3	Rafał Majka (POL)	Tinkoff–Saxo	+ 1' 10"
4	Domenico Pozzovivo (ITA)	Ag2r–La Mondiale	+ 1' 20"
5	Steve Morabito (SUI)	BMC Racing Team	+ 1' 31"
6	Fabio Aru (ITA)	Astana	+ 1' 39"
7	Diego Ulissi (ITA)	Lampre–Merida	+ 1' 43"
8	Wilco Kelderman (NED)	Belkin Pro Cycling	+ 1' 44"
9	Nairo Quintana (COL)	Movistar Team	+ 1' 45"
10	Robert Kišerlovski (CRO)	Trek Factory Racing	+ 1' 49"

== Stage 10 ==
20 May 2014 — Modena to Salsomaggiore Terme, 173 km (107.5 mi)

On this stage, members of the Colombia team wore a white cockade, in memory of the people who died in the Fundación bus fire in Colombia.

Stage 10 result

	Rider	Team	Time
1	Nacer Bouhanni (FRA)	FDJ.fr	4h 01' 13"
2	Giacomo Nizzolo (ITA)	Trek Factory Racing	s.t.
3	Michael Matthews (AUS)	Orica–GreenEDGE	s.t.
4	Roberto Ferrari (ITA)	Lampre–Merida	s.t.
5	Enrico Battaglin (ITA)	Bardiani–CSF	s.t.
6	Vladimir Gusev (RUS)	Team Katusha	s.t.
7	Albert Timmer (NED)	Giant–Shimano	s.t.
8	Ben Swift (GBR)	Team Sky	s.t.
9	Cadel Evans (AUS)	BMC Racing Team	s.t.
10	Mauro Finetto (ITA)	Neri Sottoli	s.t.

General classification after stage 10

	Rider	Team	Time
1	Cadel Evans (AUS)	BMC Racing Team	42h 50' 47"
2	Rigoberto Urán (COL)	Omega Pharma–Quick-Step	+ 57"
3	Rafał Majka (POL)	Tinkoff–Saxo	+ 1' 10"
4	Domenico Pozzovivo (ITA)	Ag2r–La Mondiale	+ 1' 20"
5	Steve Morabito (SUI)	BMC Racing Team	+ 1' 31"
6	Fabio Aru (ITA)	Astana	+ 1' 39"
7	Diego Ulissi (ITA)	Lampre–Merida	+ 1' 43"
8	Wilco Kelderman (NED)	Belkin Pro Cycling	+ 1' 44"
9	Nairo Quintana (COL)	Movistar Team	+ 1' 45"
10	Robert Kišerlovski (CRO)	Trek Factory Racing	+ 1' 49"

== Stage 11 ==
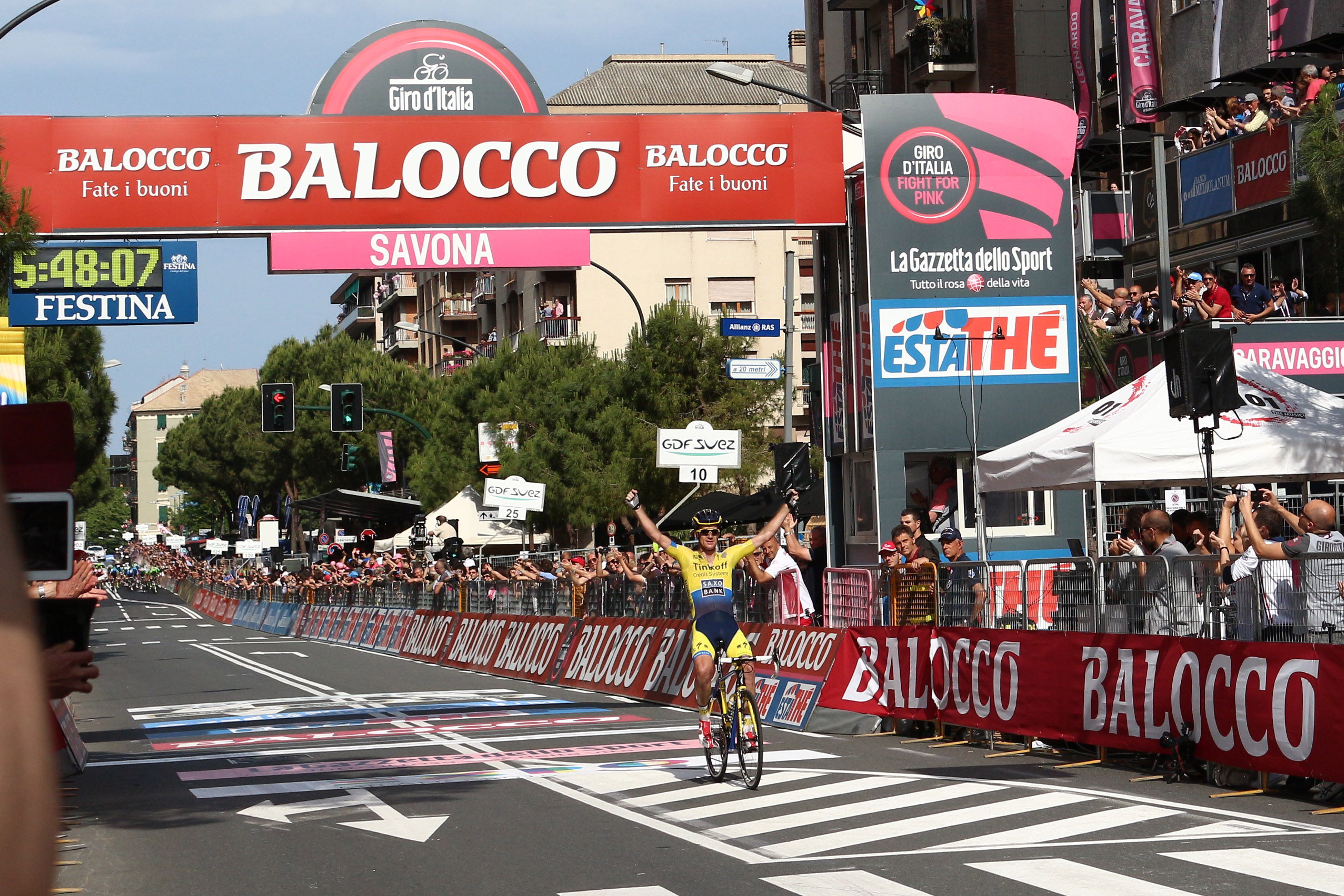
Rogers winning the stage.

21 May 2014 — Collecchio to Savona, 249 km (154.7 mi)

Stage 11 result

	Rider	Team	Time
1	Michael Rogers (AUS)	Tinkoff–Saxo	5h 48' 07"
2	Simon Geschke (GER)	Giant–Shimano	+ 10"
3	Enrico Battaglin (ITA)	Bardiani–CSF	+ 10"
4	Wilco Kelderman (NED)	Belkin Pro Cycling	+ 10"
5	Gianluca Brambilla (ITA)	Omega Pharma–Quick-Step	+ 10"
6	Moreno Moser (ITA)	Cannondale	+ 10"
7	Ryder Hesjedal (CAN)	Garmin–Sharp	+ 10"
8	Matteo Rabottini (ITA)	Neri Sottoli	+ 10"
9	Fabio Duarte (COL)	Colombia	+ 10"
10	Alexis Vuillermoz (FRA)	Ag2r–La Mondiale	+ 10"

General classification after stage 11

	Rider	Team	Time
1	Cadel Evans (AUS)	BMC Racing Team	48h 39' 04"
2	Rigoberto Urán (COL)	Omega Pharma–Quick-Step	+ 57"
3	Rafał Majka (POL)	Tinkoff–Saxo	+ 1' 10"
4	Domenico Pozzovivo (ITA)	Ag2r–La Mondiale	+ 1' 20"
5	Steve Morabito (SUI)	BMC Racing Team	+ 1' 31"
6	Fabio Aru (ITA)	Astana	+ 1' 39"
7	Wilco Kelderman (NED)	Belkin Pro Cycling	+ 1' 44"
8	Nairo Quintana (COL)	Movistar Team	+ 1' 45"
9	Robert Kišerlovski (CRO)	Trek Factory Racing	+ 1' 49"
10	Ivan Basso (ITA)	Cannondale	+ 2' 01"
