= Fabio Aru =

Italian cyclist

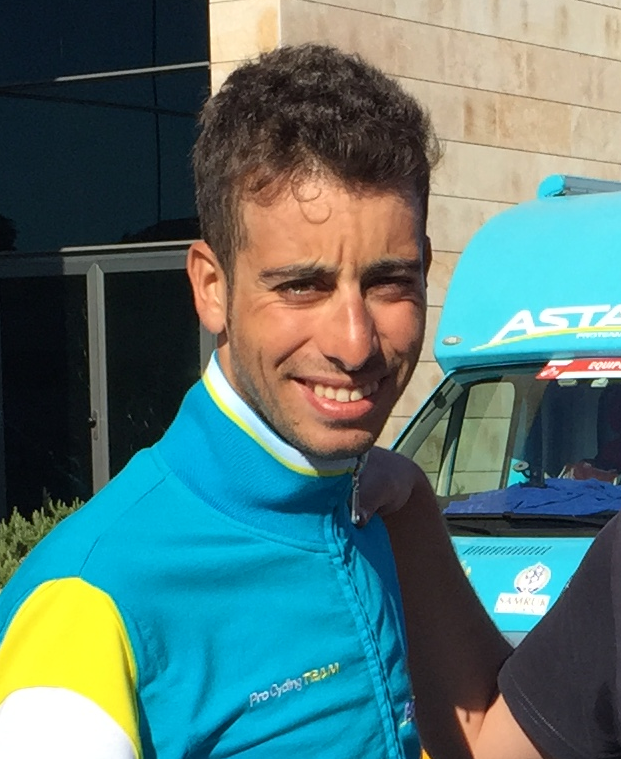
- Aru at the 2015 Vuelta a España

Personal information
- Full name: Fabio Aru
- Nicknames: The Knight of the four Moors (Italian: Il cavaliere dei quattro mori)
- Born: 3 July 1990 (age 36) San Gavino Monreale, Sardinia, Italy
- Height: 1.83 m (6 ft 0 in)
- Weight: 63 kg (139 lb; 9 st 13 lb)

Cycling career
- Sport: Cycling
- Discipline: Road
- Role: Rider
- Rider type: Climber

Amateur team
- 2009–2012: Palazzago

Professional teams
- 2012–2017: Astana
- 2018–2020: UAE Team Emirates
- 2021: Team Qhubeka Assos

Major wins
- Grand Tours Tour de France 1 individual stage (2017) Giro d'Italia Young rider classification (2015) 3 individual stages (2014, 2015) Vuelta a España General classification (2015) 2 individual stages (2014) One-day races and Classics National Road Race Championships (2017)

Fabio Aru (born 3 July 1990) is an Italian former professional road bicycle racer, who rode professionally between 2012 and 2021 for the Astana, UAE Team Emirates and Team Qhubeka NextHash squads. He hails from San Gavino Monreale in Sardinia, and is known for his climbing ability, which made him a favorite for the Grand Tours. He is known as "The Knight of the four Moors", a reference to his native island of Sardinia.

During his career, Aru won stages in all three Grand Tours, including a stage at the Tour de France, three stages at the Giro d'Italia and two stages at the Vuelta a España, and won the 2017 Italian National Road Race Championships. Alongside his stage wins, Aru has also worn the race leader's jersey in all three Grand Tours. In 2014, Aru placed third overall in the Giro d'Italia and fifth in the Vuelta a España. The following year, he finished second in the Giro d'Italia before taking his only overall Grand Tour win at the Vuelta a España. His best finish at the Tour de France came in 2017 where he was 5th.

== Career ==
=== Early career ===
Aru was born in San Gavino Monreale, Sardinia and was raised in Villacidro. At the age of 18 he moved to mainland Italy to pursue a cycling career. He joined the Palazzago team where he won the Giro della Valle d'Aosta in 2011 and 2012. Also in 2012, he finished second behind American rider Joe Dombrowski in the Baby Giro.

=== Astana (2012–2017) ===
Aru joined Astana during the 2012 season after four years with the Palazzago domestic team in Italy.

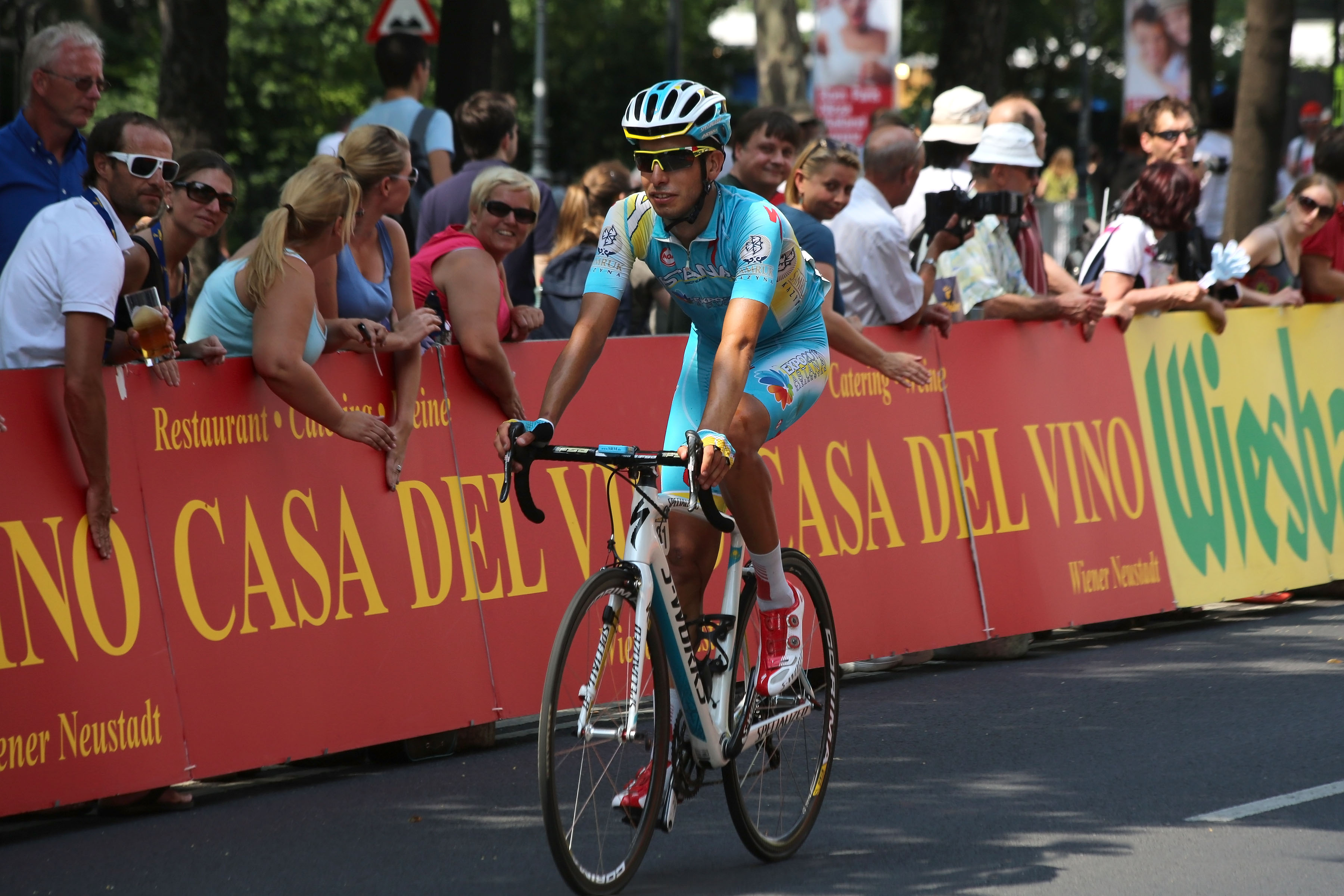
Aru at the 2013 Tour of Austria

In 2013 he finished fourth overall in the Giro del Trentino, also claiming the young rider classification. He rode his first Grand Tour, the Giro d'Italia, in support of team leader Vincenzo Nibali. He helped Nibali win the race overall, finishing 42nd himself.

==== 2014 ====
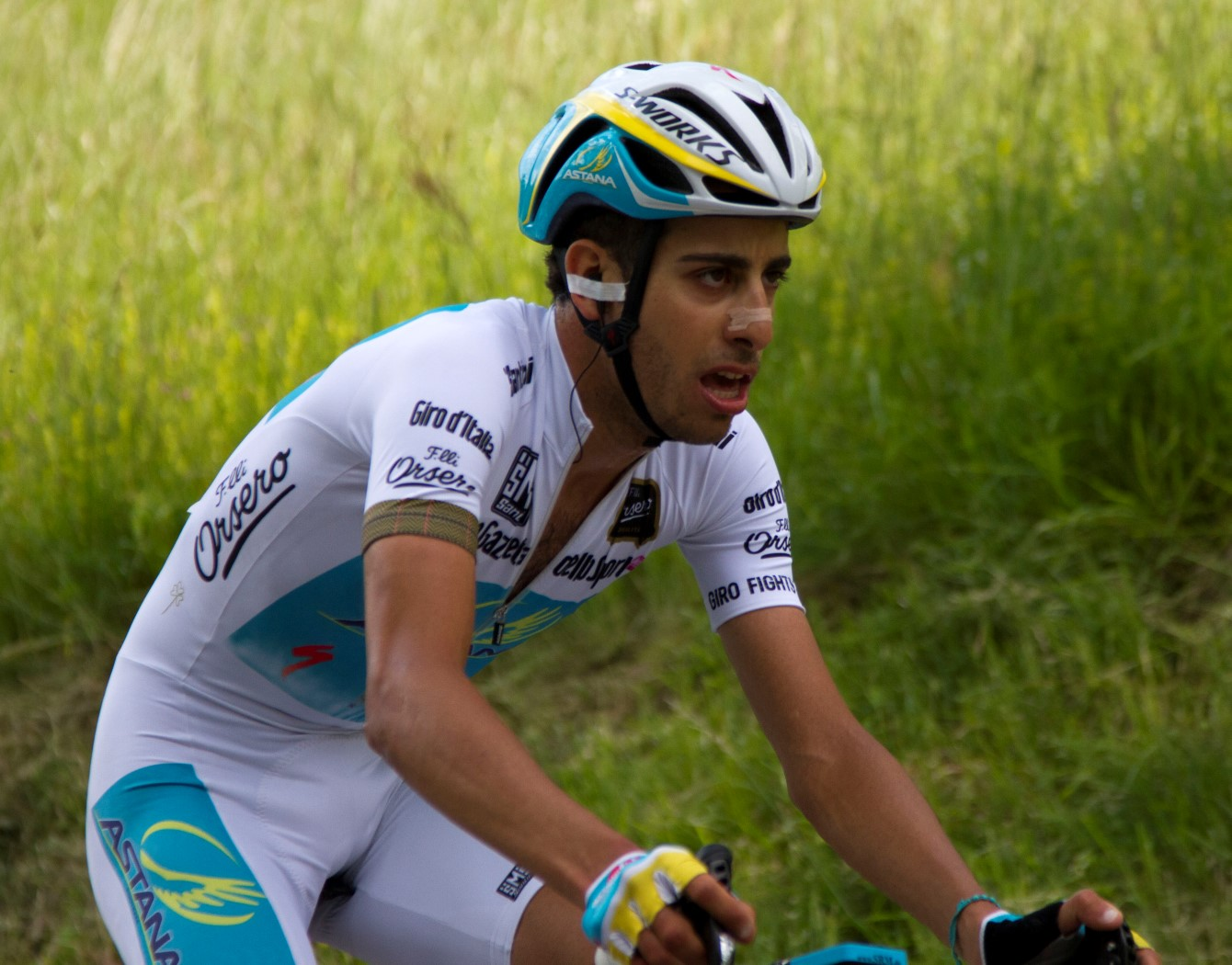
Aru at the 2014 Giro d'Italia

In 2014, Aru again rode the Giro d'Italia, with the expectation of supporting former winner Michele Scarponi. However, Aru proved stronger than his teammate and on Stage 15 took his first professional victory by winning on the summit finish of Montecampione. Aru went on to finish the Giro in third place overall behind Nairo Quintana (Movistar Team) and Rigoberto Urán (Omega Pharma–Quick-Step), reaching the podium in just his second Grand Tour.

In his next Grand Tour, the Vuelta a España, Aru won the Stage 11 summit finish atop the Santuario de San Miguel de Aralar, attacking the leading group in the final kilometre. He repeated the feat on Stage 18 finishing at Monte Castrove; he escaped with Chris Froome near the end of the climb and outsprinted his rival. He finished the race, won by Alberto Contador, in fifth overall.

He finished his season in the Italian Autumn classics, placing fourth in Milano–Torino and ninth in the Giro di Lombardia.

==== 2015 ====
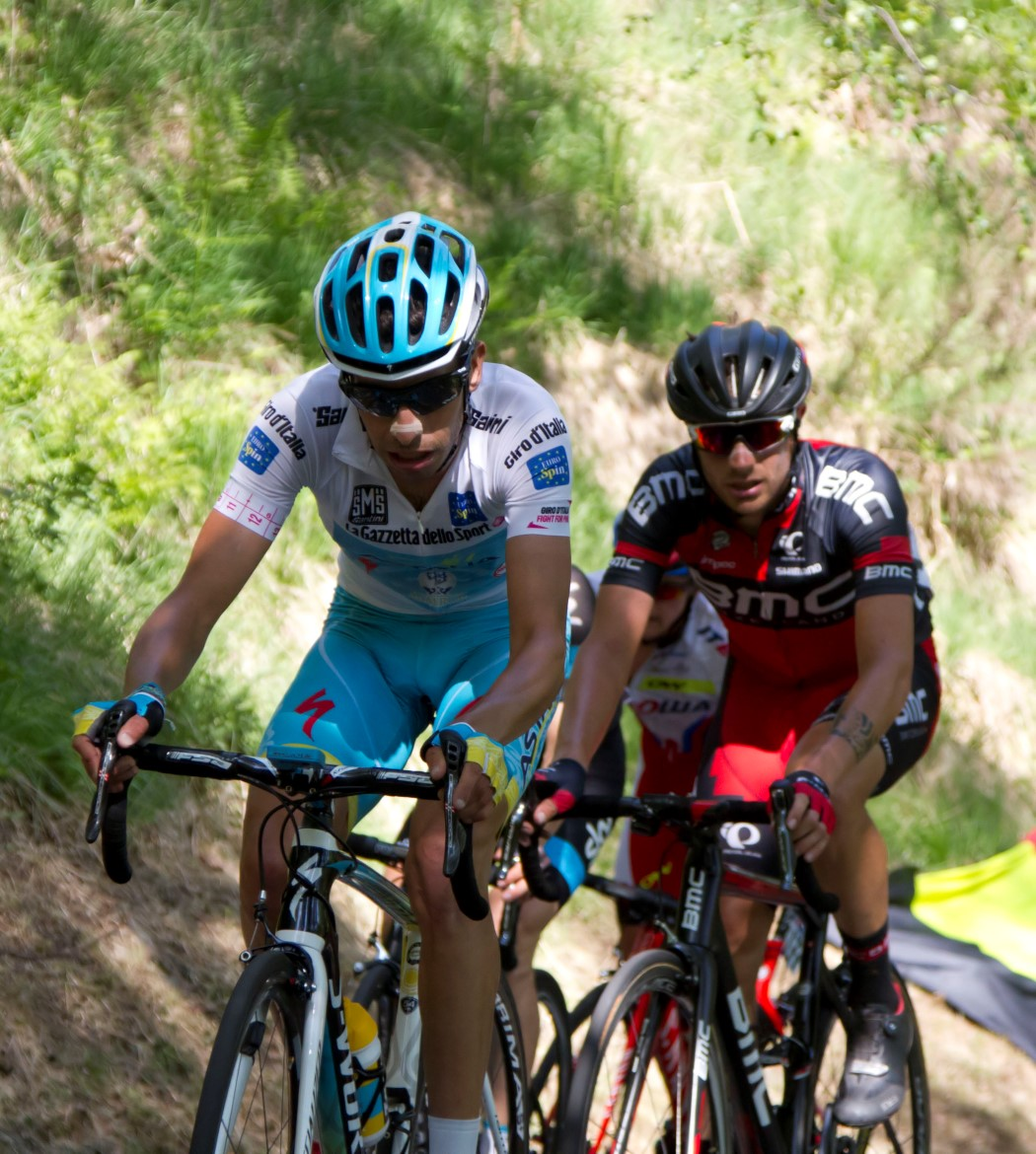
Aru (left), wearing the white jersey of young rider classification leader, at the 2015 Giro d'Italia.

In 2015, Aru came in sixth at the Volta a Catalunya. In April, he missed the Giro del Trentino because of an intestinal ailment. Greg Henderson accused Aru of faking the ailment, and actually skipping due to a pending biological passport case. Aru promised to sue Henderson for his accusations as he was preparing for the Giro d'Italia. In May 2015, it was announced that Aru's contract with Astana was renewed until the end of 2017. The Giro d'Italia started off poorly for Aru's Astana team, losing seconds to Alberto Contador and the Tinkoff–Saxo team. However, in the first week of racing, Aru attacked Contador in the mountains as he was led by his Astana team, remaining only seconds behind Contador in the general classification battle. When Contador crashed on stage 13 in a pile-up, Aru crossed the line well in front of Contador, securing the first pink jersey of his career. However the next day, a 59.3-kilometre (36.8-mile) individual time trial, hyped as the Giro's determining day, Aru lost 2 and a half minutes to Contador, thus losing the pink jersey. He lost more time in the Mortirolo stage, but bounced back on Stage 19 to take an emotional solo victory. On Stage 20 featuring the Colle delle Finestre, Aru won his second consecutive stage, taking two minutes from Contador but failing to take the pink jersey.

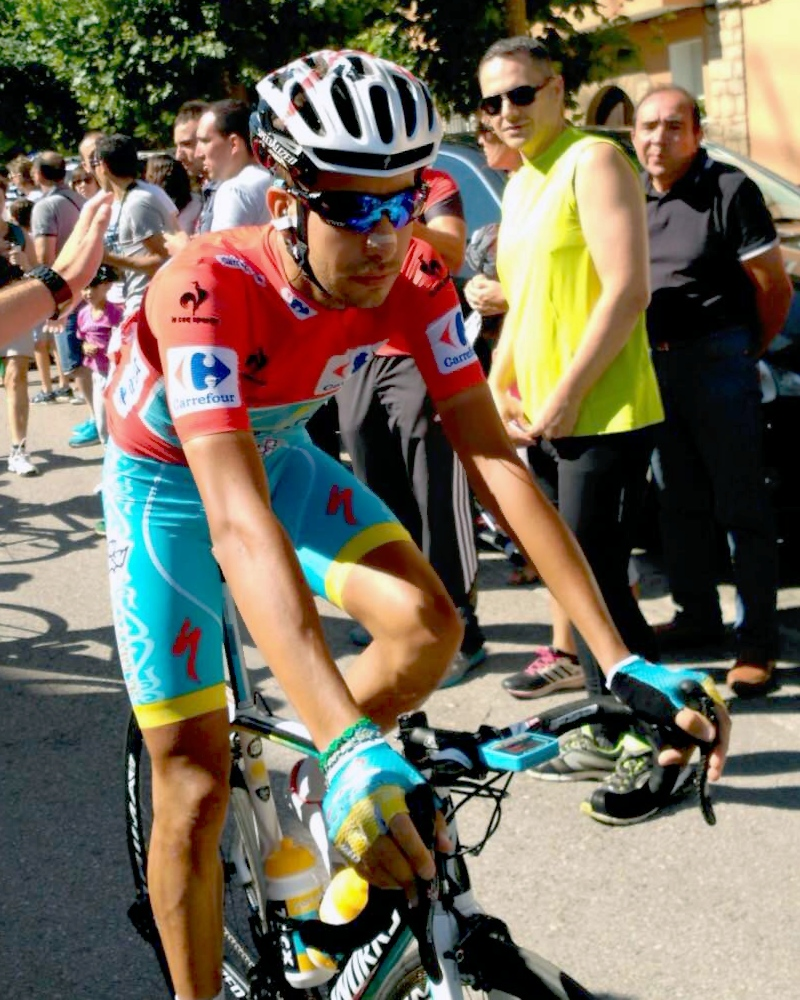
Aru, wearing the red jersey of general classification leader, at the 2015 Vuelta a España.

Aru returned to racing at the Tour de Pologne and finished in 5th place as he prepared for his next season target, the Vuelta a España. He performed well in the first week, taking the red leader's jersey after finishing second on stage 11, the Vuelta's queen stage. He held the lead by a handful of seconds before losing it to Joaquim Rodríguez on stage 16. On stage 17, a 38-kilometre (24-mile) individual time trial, he was able to perform very well and keep himself within 3 seconds of the winner of the stage and new leader of the Vuelta, Tom Dumoulin. Over the final days, Aru attacked Dumoulin repeatedly, trying to place himself back in red. It was not until the penultimate mountain day that Aru succeeded, dropping Dumoulin and advancing himself towards his first Grand Tour win.

==== 2016 ====
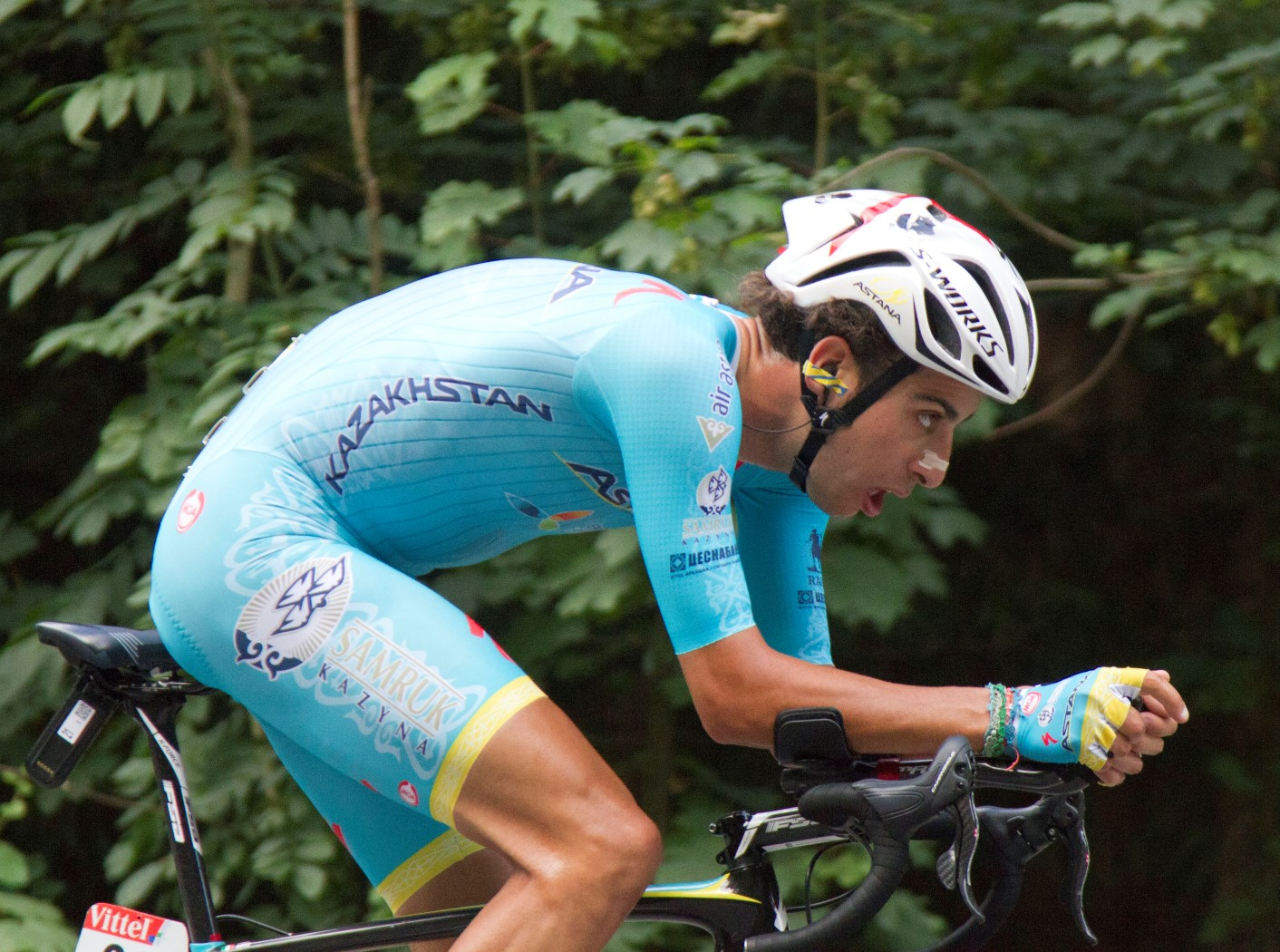
Aru at the 2016 Tour de France

Aru started his 2016 season, at the Volta a la Comunitat Valenciana where he finished 6th overall. He then raced the Volta ao Algarve, and finished 9th overall after taking 2nd place on the last stage. He took his only victory of the season, at the Critérium du Dauphiné where he won Stage 3 after attacking on the downhill inside the last 15 kilometres (9.3 miles) of the stage. His main goal of the season was the Tour de France, and after Stage 8 Aru was 7th overall but dropped to 13th on the following stage to Andorra Arcalis. He managed to get into the top 10 again on Stage 12 to Mont Ventoux. He had a mechanical problem on the stage, and had problems getting back into the bunch before the climb to Mont Ventoux. He received help from the Astana team car, as he was paced for a while, resulting in a time penalty post-stage. On the last mountain stage he was not feeling well, and ended up losing 13 minutes to his main rivals, dropping to 13th place in the general classification.

==== 2017 ====
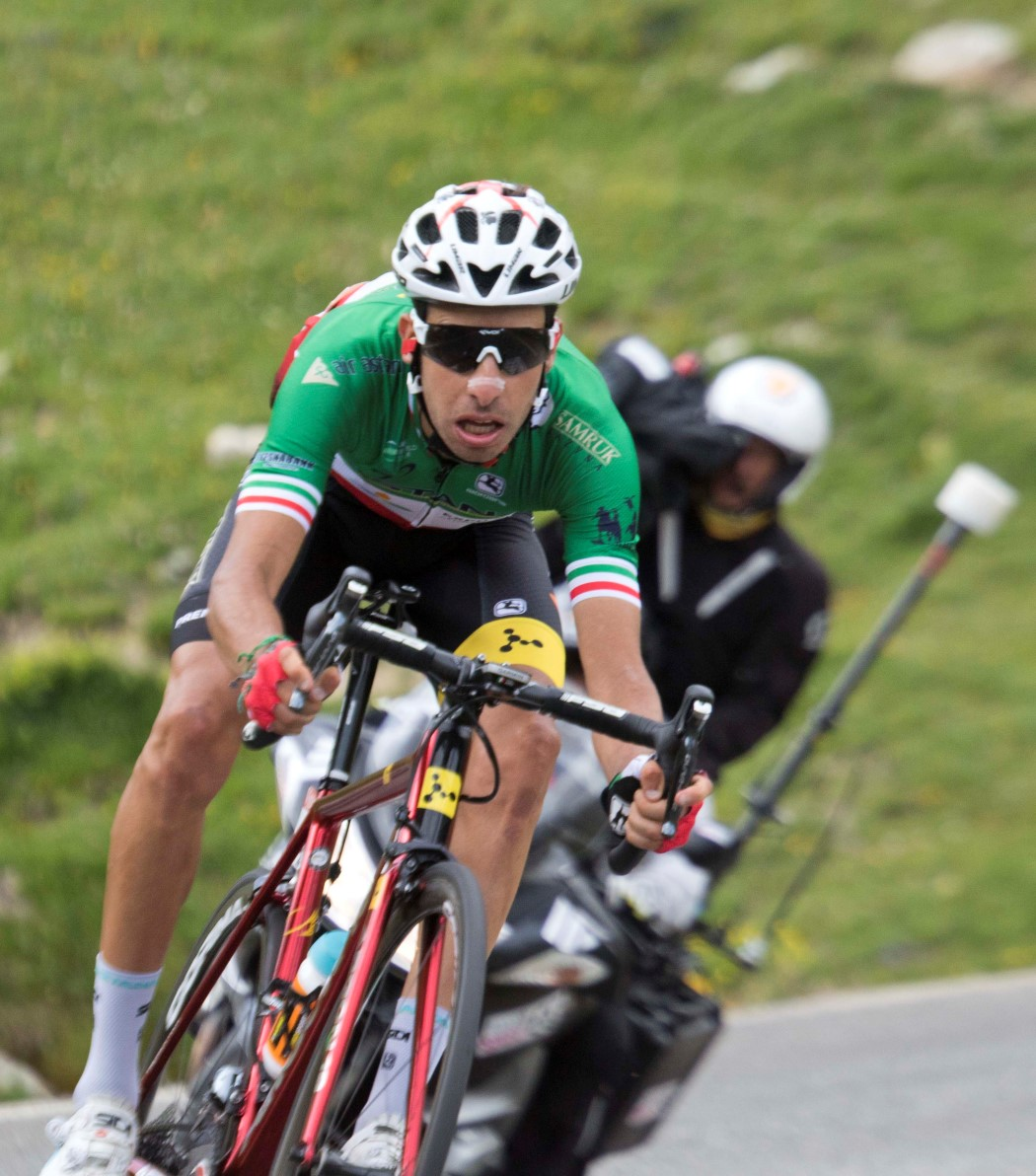
Aru at the 2017 Tour de France

Going into the 2017 season, Aru was targeting the 100th edition of the Giro d'Italia. He showed good form early on in the season with his first podium place coming at the Tour of Oman, where he finished 3rd overall. He finished 8th overall in his following race at the Abu Dhabi Tour. In April, in a training camp at Sierra Nevada, Aru crashed and hurt his knee. He received no fractures to the knee but it was swollen a lot, and he was recommended by a doctor to stay off the bike for several days in order to recover properly, missing the Giro d'Italia as a result. He returned to racing in June at the Critérium du Dauphiné, and finished 5th overall. One week before the Tour de France, Aru won the Italian National Road Race Championships for the first time in his career. He later described this victory as the best moment in his career.

At the Tour de France, Aru won the 5th stage attacking on the climb to La Planche des Belles Filles, 2.2 kilometres (1.4 miles) from the finish line. After that stage he wore the polka dot jersey for three days. On stage 9 he was accused of unsportsmanlike behaviour after attacking yellow jersey holder Chris Froome as the latter suffered from a mechanical issue. The camera captured Aru attacking from behind right when he realized Froome had a mechanical. On stage 12 he attacked on the climb to Peyragudes and he took the yellow jersey from Froome. In the next stages he struggled with bronchitis and he finished fifth overall in his second Tour de France. This was his best general classification finish in a Grand Tour following his 2015 Vuelta a España win, and his win on stage 5 was the ninth and final victory of his career.

=== UAE Team Emirates (2018–2020) ===
==== 2018 ====
After riding 6 seasons with Astana, Aru signed a three-year contract with UAE Team Emirates. He started his season at the Abu Dhabi Tour but only finished 13th overall. At the following race, Tirreno–Adriatico, Aru finished 4th to Sarnano Sassotetto, but was struggling on other decisive stages, meaning he once again missed out on the top 10, in 12th place. His first top 10 finish of the season came at the Tour of the Alps. Aru could not follow the pace of his fellow Giro d'Italia contenders Chris Froome, Thibaut Pinot, Domenico Pozzovivo, Miguel Ángel López and George Bennett, and ended the race in 6th position.

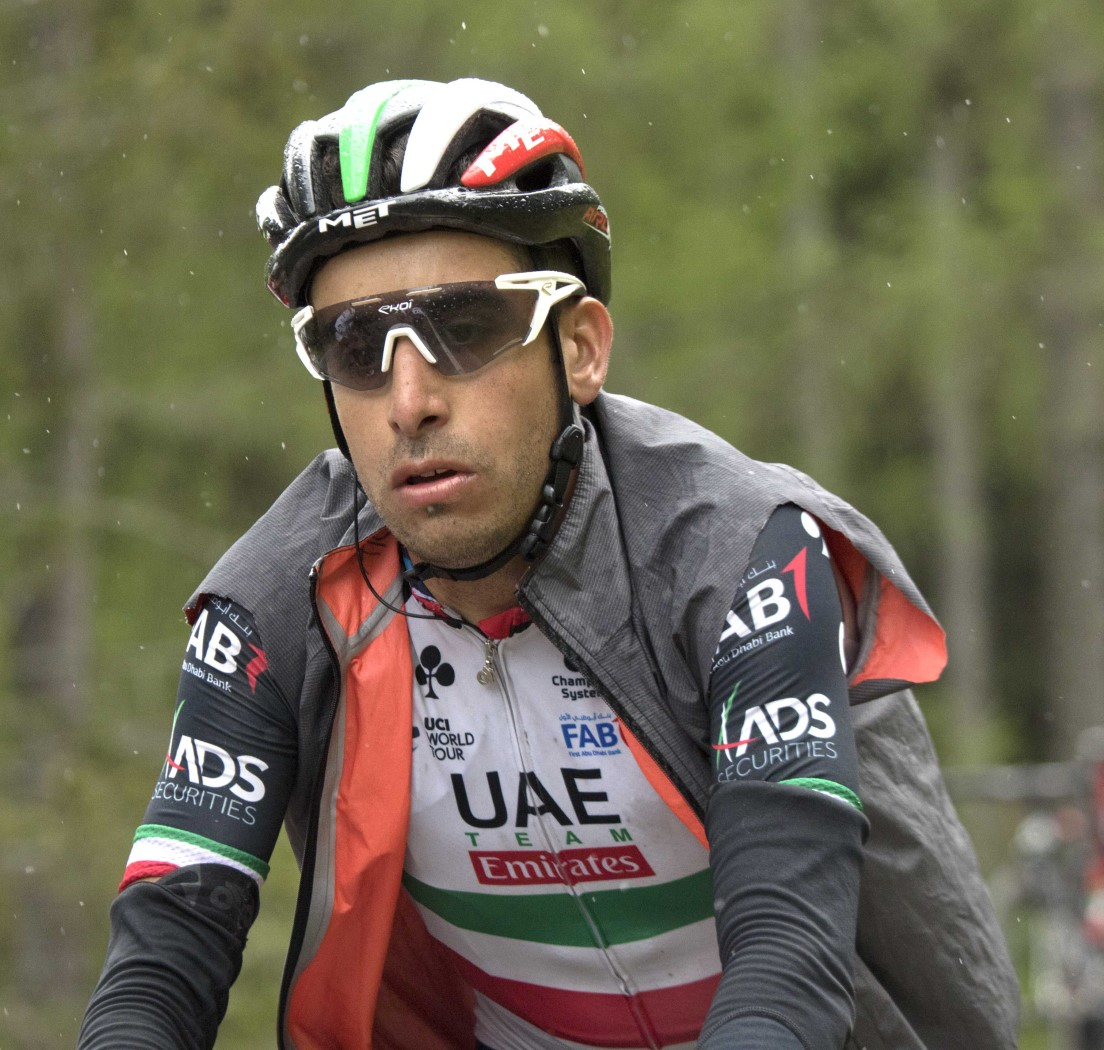
Aru at the 2018 Giro d'Italia.

At the Giro d'Italia, he finished alongside many of the strong Giro contenders on the stage to Mount Etna, and moved up to 10th position after the stage. However, on the following mountain stages, Aru did not manage to finish with the strongest riders meaning that he dropped to 22nd place after the 2nd week of racing. However he bounced back on the next stage, which was a mainly flat time trial. He finished 8th on the stage but was later penalised due to pacing. Aru finally withdrew from the race on Stage 19. Aru explained he had suffered from a gluten and dairy intolerance since 2015 but never got to the bottom of it. Aru and his personal coach Paolo Tiralongo made his training too hard, and spent too much time at altitude which meant his body was fatigued already going into the Giro d'Italia. He returned to racing at the end of July, at the Tour de Wallonie, and finished 10th overall. A week later at the Tour de Pologne, Aru finished 10th overall once again. He started the Vuelta a España as one of the main favourites. However his form was fluctuating, and he was over 10 minutes behind Simon Yates, starting stage 17. On the stage, Aru crashed before the final climb which ripped his shorts. Aru reacting angrily while calling for a new bike; as a result, he had to formally apologise to Colnago's Ernesto Colnago by telephone after the stage.

==== 2019 ====
In March 2019, following a disappointing start of the season, Aru was diagnosed with a constriction of the iliac artery and underwent an angioplasty surgery, which forced him out from racing for several months. As a result, his immediate plans to ride the Volta a Catalunya, as well as the Giro d'Italia were abandoned. Aru was back on his bike at altitude training in Sestriere in May. He made his comeback to racing in June, at the Gran Premio di Lugano where he finished 22nd. A week later he started his first Tour de Suisse.

=== Team Qhubeka Assos (2021) ===
In December 2020, Aru signed a one-year contract with Team Qhubeka Assos, for the 2021 season. Shortly before the Vuelta a España, Aru announced that he would retire from cycling at the conclusion of the race. His best results from his final season were a pair of second-place overall finishes at the Sibiu Cycling Tour and the Vuelta a Burgos.

== Personal life ==
Aru resides in the Swiss city of Lugano, a few kilometres north of the Italian border. Aru suffers from a gluten and dairy intolerance which means he struggles with food intake. He has cut away dairy from his diet, and has also limited the amount of pasta he eats in order to keep his diet on track. After his retirement from cycle racing, Aru expressed an interest in competing in triathlon in the future.

== Major results ==
2010
2nd Trofeo Gianfranco Bianchin
4th Overall Giro della Valle d'Aosta
5th Giro del Belvedere
2011
1st Overall Giro della Valle d'Aosta

1st Stage 6 (ITT)

2nd Road race, National Under-23 Road Championships
2nd Overall Toscana-Terra di Ciclismo
4th Overall Giro Ciclistico d'Italia
6th Gran Premio Palio del Recioto
10th Giro del Medio Brenta
2012
1st Overall Giro della Valle d'Aosta

1st Stage 3

1st Overall Toscana-Terra di Ciclismo
2nd Overall Baby Giro
4th Gran Premio Palio del Recioto
8th Trofeo Banca Popolare di Vicenza
2013
4th Overall Giro del Trentino

1st Young rider classification

7th Tre Valli Varesine
8th Overall Tour of Austria
2014
3rd Overall Giro d'Italia

1st Stage 15

4th Milano–Torino
5th Overall Vuelta a España

1st Stages 11 & 18

7th Overall Giro del Trentino
9th Giro di Lombardia
2015
1st Overall Vuelta a España
2nd Overall Giro d'Italia

1st Young rider classification
1st Stages 19 & 20
Held after Stage 13

2nd Overall Abu Dhabi Tour
2nd Tour of Almaty
3rd Milano–Torino
5th Overall Tour de Pologne
5th Overall UCI World Tour
6th Overall Volta a Catalunya
2016
1st Stage 3 Critérium du Dauphiné
4th Overall Giro di Toscana
4th Giro dell'Emilia
6th Road race, Olympic Games
6th Overall Volta a la Comunitat Valenciana
6th Milano–Torino
9th Overall Volta ao Algarve
9th Tre Valli Varesine
2017
1st Road race, National Road Championships
3rd Overall Tour of Oman
3rd Milano–Torino
5th Overall Tour de France

1st Stage 5
Held after Stages 12–13
Held after Stages 5–7

5th Overall Critérium du Dauphiné
7th Giro di Lombardia
8th Overall Abu Dhabi Tour
8th Tre Valli Varesine
2018
6th Overall Tour of the Alps
9th Milano–Torino
10th Overall Tour de Pologne
10th Overall Tour de Wallonie
2019
8th Trofeo Campos, Porreres, Felanitx, Ses Salines
2020
5th Mont Ventoux Dénivelé Challenge
9th Overall Vuelta a Burgos
10th Overall Tour de l'Ain
2021
2nd Overall Vuelta a Burgos
2nd Overall Sibiu Cycling Tour

=== General classification results timeline ===
Grand Tour general classification results
Grand Tour	2013	2014	2015	2016	2017	2018	2019	2020	2021
Giro d'Italia	42	3	2	—	—	DNF	—	—	—
Tour de France	—	—	—	13	5	—	14	DNF	—
Vuelta a España	—	5	1	—	13	23	DNF	—	51
Major stage race general classification results
Race	2013	2014	2015	2016	2017	2018	2019	2020	2021
Paris–Nice	—	—	39	—	—	—	DNF	—	26
Tirreno–Adriatico	—	—	—	—	DNF	12	—	—	—
Volta a Catalunya	70	21	6	14	—	DNF	—	NH	—
Tour of the Basque Country	—	—	—	DNF	—	—	—	NH	24
Tour de Romandie	—	—	—	—	—	—	—	NH	—
Critérium du Dauphiné	—	—	—	45	5	—	—	—	26
Tour de Suisse	—	—	—	—	—	—	21	NH	—

=== Monuments results timeline ===
Monument	2012	2013	2014	2015	2016	2017	2018	2019	2020	2021
Milan–San Remo	Did not contest during his career									
Tour of Flanders	Did not contest during his career									
Paris–Roubaix	Did not contest during his career									
Liège–Bastogne–Liège	—	—	—	—	—	—	—	—	—	61
Giro di Lombardia	DNF	DNF	9	—	11	7	54	—	DNF	—

Legend
—	Did not compete
DNF	Did not finish
DSQ	Disqualified
NH	Not held
IP	In progress
