= Montecampione =

Coordinates: 45°49′49″N 10°11′5″E

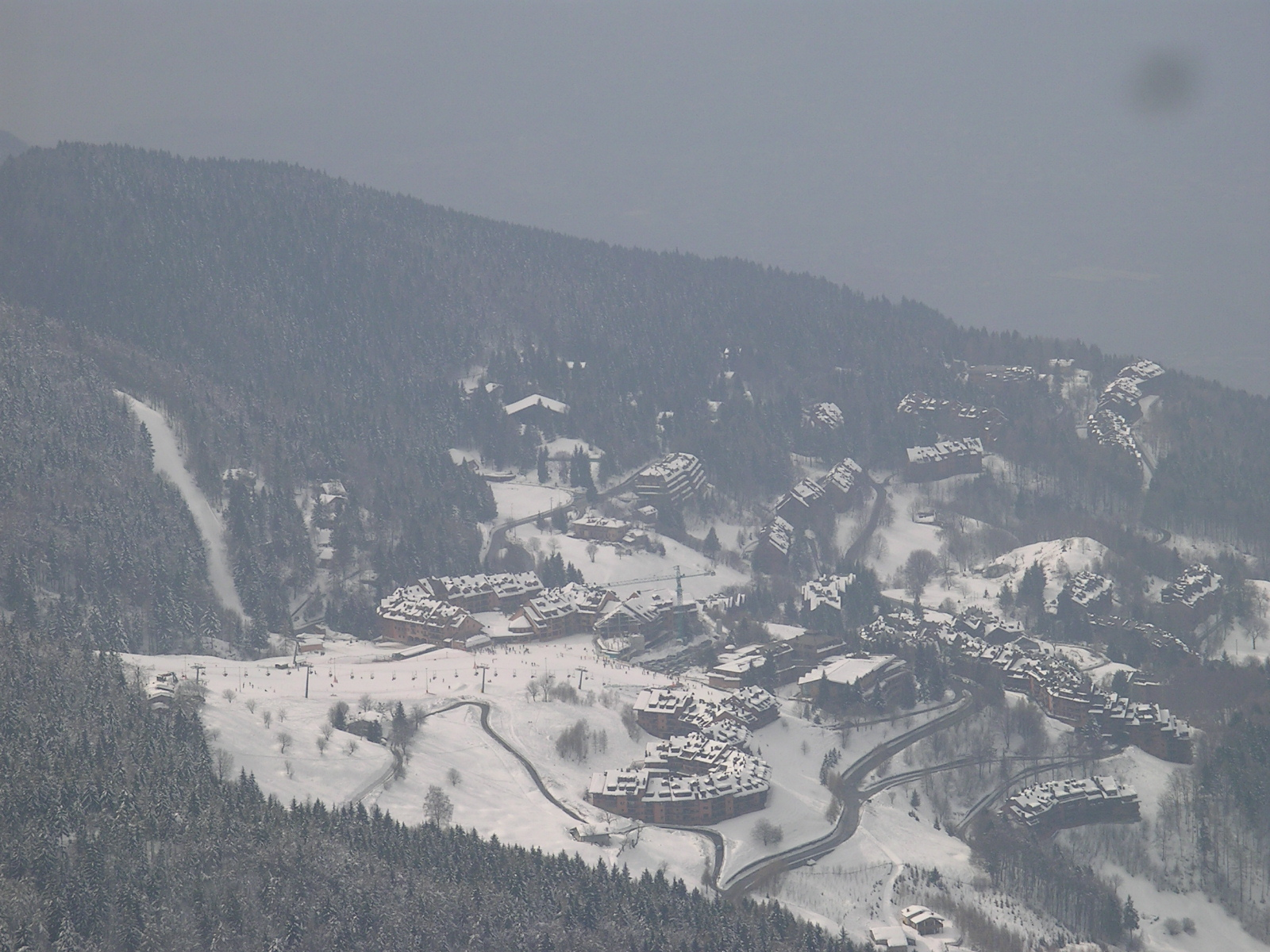
View of Montecampione.

Location in the Alps of Europe

Montecampione is a ski resort in Valcamonica, Lombardy, northern Italy. It is part of the communes of Artogne and Pian Camuno and is located 60 km (37 mi) from Brescia and 95 km (60 mi) from Milan, near Lake Iseo. The resort operates from mid-December to the end of March. Montecampione is the closest ski resort to Milan's Orio al Serio International Airport.

After the failure of Alpiaz Srl, the corporation which developed the resort from the ground up, the resort has been managed by several other organizations with varying degrees of success.

The operation of ski lifts and slopes is now in the hands of Plan 1800 Srl, which has managed to get 4 of the 11 ski lifts running, with the others needing renovations.

== Statistics ==
- Lifts: 11
- Lift capacity: 18,000 per hour
- Runs: 23 (around 65 km (40 mi)
- Bars: 12 including lodges
- Height: 1,200–2,050 m (3,940–6,730 ft)
- Vertical: 850 m (2,790 ft)
- Stations:
  - 1,200 m (3,940 ft) - Alpiaz
  - 1,400 m (4,590 ft) - Secondino
  - 1,800 m (5,910 ft) - Plan

The ski hire shops are at 1,200 m and 1,800 m
