= 2013 Tirreno–Adriatico =

2013 UCI World Tour, race 3 of 28

Race details
- Dates: 6–12 March 2013
- Stages: 7
- Distance: 1,060.1 km (658.7 mi)
- Winning time: 28h 08' 17"

Results
Jersey awarded to the overall winner	Winner	Vincenzo Nibali (Italy)	(Astana)
	Second	Chris Froome (Great Britain)	(Team Sky)
	Third	Alberto Contador (Spain)	(Saxo–Tinkoff)
Jersey awarded to the points classification winner	Points	Alberto Contador (Spain)	(Saxo–Tinkoff)
Jersey awarded to the mountains classification winner	Mountains	Damiano Cunego (Italy)	(Lampre–Merida)
Jersey awarded to the young rider classification winner	Young rider	Michał Kwiatkowski (Poland)	(Omega Pharma–Quick-Step)
	Team	Movistar Team	

The 2013 Tirreno–Adriatico was the 48th edition of the Tirreno–Adriatico cycling stage race, often known as the Race of the Two Seas. It started on 6 March in San Vincenzo and ended on 12 March in San Benedetto del Tronto and consisted of seven stages, including a race-commencing team time trial and a race-concluding individual time trial. It was the third race of the 2013 UCI World Tour season.

The race was won for the second consecutive year by Italy's Vincenzo Nibali of the Astana team – becoming the first rider to do so since Tony Rominger in 1989 and 1990 – who took the race lead on the penultimate stage, and held the lead to the end of the race, the following day in San Benedetto del Tronto. Nibali won the general classification by 23 seconds over runner-up Chris Froome (Team Sky), who won the race's queen stage – the fourth stage – at a summit finish at Prati di Tivo. Saxo–Tinkoff's Alberto Contador completed the podium, 29 seconds behind Froome and 52 seconds down on Nibali. Contador was also the winner of the points classification, taking home the red jersey for amassing the highest number of points during stages at intermediate sprints and stage finishes.

In the race's other classifications, Omega Pharma–Quick-Step's Michał Kwiatkowski was the winner of the white jersey for the young rider classification as he was the highest placed rider born in 1988 or later, finishing in fourth place overall, having led the general classification for one stage. Lampre–Merida's Damiano Cunego won the green jersey as winner of the mountains classification, while the Movistar Team were winners of the teams classification.

== Teams ==
As Tirreno–Adriatico was a UCI World Tour event, all UCI ProTeams were invited automatically and obligated to send a squad. Originally, eighteen ProTeams were invited to the race, with four other squads given wildcard places, and as such, would have formed the event's 22-team peloton. Originally admitted to the event as a wildcard, Team Katusha subsequently regained their ProTour status after an appeal to the Court of Arbitration for Sport.

The 22 teams that competed in the race were:

- Ag2r–La Mondiale
- Argos–Shimano
- Astana
- Blanco Pro Cycling
- BMC Racing Team
- Cannondale
- Euskaltel–Euskadi
- FDJ
- Garmin–Sharp
- Team Katusha
- Lampre–Merida
- Lotto–Belisol
- Movistar Team
- MTN–Qhubeka
- NetApp–Endura
- Omega Pharma–Quick-Step
- Orica–GreenEDGE
- RadioShack–Leopard
- Saxo–Tinkoff
- Team Sky
- Vacansoleil–DCM
- Vini Fantini–Selle Italia

Among the 176-rider start list were five previous winners of the race, including the most recent three riders to win. Lampre–Merida's Filippo Pozzato (winner in 2003), and 2008 winner Fabian Cancellara of RadioShack–Leopard, were both using the race as a tune-up for the spring Classic races. Stefano Garzelli (2010), Cadel Evans (2011), and Vincenzo Nibali (2012) were all leaders of their respective squads Vini Fantini–Selle Italia, BMC Racing Team and Astana.

== Race overview ==
Stage	Date	Course	Distance	Type	Winner
1	6 March	San Vincenzo to Donoratico	16.9 km (10.5 mi)	Team time trial	Omega Pharma–Quick-Step
2	7 March	San Vincenzo to Indicatore	232 km (144.2 mi)	Flat stage	Matthew Goss (AUS)
3	8 March	Indicatore to Narni Scalo	190 km (118.1 mi)	Flat stage	Peter Sagan (SVK)
4	9 March	Narni to Prati di Tivo	173 km (107.5 mi)	Mountain stage	Chris Froome (GBR)
5	10 March	Ortona to Chieti	230 km (142.9 mi)	Mountain stage	Joaquim Rodríguez (ESP)
6	11 March	Porto Sant'Elpidio to Porto Sant'Elpidio	209 km (129.9 mi)	Intermediate stage	Peter Sagan (SVK)
7	12 March	San Benedetto del Tronto	9.2 km (5.7 mi)	Individual time trial	Tony Martin (GER)

== Stages ==
=== Stage 1 ===
6 March 2013 — San Vincenzo to Donoratico, 16.9 km (10.5 mi) team time trial (TTT)

The opening stage team time trial was contested over the same 16.9 km (10.5 mi) parcours that the 2012 edition of the race started with. On that occasion it was the GreenEDGE team that won by seventeen seconds from their closest rivals, completing the course in a time of 18' 41". The 2013 running of the team time trial was never going to trouble that sort of time due to the weather conditions beside the Mediterranean Sea, as rain caused treacherous conditions for the teams. Lotto–Belisol were the first team over the start line in San Vincenzo, and set the early benchmark with a time of 20' 19", but only held the top spot for a short period, as the defending winners Orica–GreenEDGE went beneath twenty minutes for the course by recording a time of 19' 48". After Joaquim Rodríguez and Team Katusha failed to impress on the course, Movistar Team took the lead, going thirteen seconds quicker than the time set by Orica–GreenEDGE. After a fifteenth-place finish on the stage in 2012, Cannondale improved vastly with their performance, getting to within seven seconds of the time of the Movistar Team – with the team describing their performance as a confidence boost – but both would be usurped by the pre-stage favourites Omega Pharma–Quick-Step.

With proficient time trial riders Tony Martin, Michał Kwiatkowski and Niki Terpstra among their ranks, the squad were fastest by three seconds at the midway point of the stage, which was later extended to eleven seconds by the time they reached Donoratico, stopping the clock with an eventual stage-winning time of 19' 24". As Mark Cavendish was the first of the team's riders to cross the line, he was entitled to wear the race's first azzurra jersey, but attributed the acclaim to Martin, who he believed had done most of the work during the stage. Kwiatkowski was also part of the train at the finish – as well as Terpstra and Zdeněk Štybar – and thus was the best placed rider under the age of 25, and was entitled to wear the first white jersey. Along with the Movistar Team and Cannondale, BMC Racing Team were the only other team to get within twenty seconds of the winning time. Of the overall contenders, defending champion Vincenzo Nibali and his Astana squad were best positioned in fifth place, trailing Omega Pharma–Quick-Step by exactly twenty seconds. Chris Froome's Team Sky outfit gave up five seconds to Nibali in a time of 19' 49", while Saxo–Tinkoff, with Alberto Contador amongst their ranks, recorded a time of 19' 56", twelve seconds behind Nibali.

Stage 1 Result

	Team	Time
1	Omega Pharma–Quick-Step	19' 24"
2	Movistar Team	+ 11"
3	BMC Racing Team	+ 16"
4	Cannondale	+ 19"
5	Astana	+ 20"
6	Orica–GreenEDGE	+ 24"
7	Team Sky	+ 25"
8	Saxo–Tinkoff	+ 29"
9	Lampre–Merida	+ 35"
10	RadioShack–Leopard	+ 36"

General Classification after Stage 1

	Rider	Team	Time
1	Mark Cavendish (GBR)	Omega Pharma–Quick-Step	19' 24"
2	Tony Martin (GER)	Omega Pharma–Quick-Step	+ 0"
3	Michał Kwiatkowski (POL)	Omega Pharma–Quick-Step	+ 0"
4	Zdeněk Štybar (CZE)	Omega Pharma–Quick-Step	+ 0"
5	Niki Terpstra (NED)	Omega Pharma–Quick-Step	+ 0"
6	Giovanni Visconti (ITA)	Movistar Team	+ 11"
7	Beñat Intxausti (ESP)	Movistar Team	+ 11"
8	Andrey Amador (CRC)	Movistar Team	+ 11"
9	Jonathan Castroviejo (ESP)	Movistar Team	+ 11"
10	Eros Capecchi (ITA)	Movistar Team	+ 11"

=== Stage 2 ===
7 March 2013 — San Vincenzo to Indicatore, 232 km (144.2 mi)

With an itinerary of 232 km (144.2 mi), the first mass-start stage of Tirreno–Adriatico was also the longest stage of the 2013 edition of the race. However, this did not stop the stage being set up for the sprinters' benefit. There were two categorised climbs in the first half of the stage, at the Massa Marittima and the Cantoniera Montebello respectively, but after descending from the latter climb, the rest of the parcours was relatively flat before entering Indicatore for the first time. From then on, five laps of a 12.4 km (7.7 mi) finishing circuit were to be completed, with bonus time on offer at intermediate sprint points on the second and fourth passes of the finish line. However, like the previous day's team time trial, rain was expected to factor into the riding conditions, especially for the finish, which included a railway overpass around 1.2 km (0.7 mi) from the line.

A trio of riders – Euskaltel–Euskadi's Garikoitz Bravo, NetApp–Endura rider Cesare Benedetti and Kevin Hulsmans of Vini Fantini–Selle Italia – made the early breakaway from the field, and managed to extend their advantage to the main field to around nine minutes at one point during the stage, before eventually stabilising at the seven-minute mark for the majority of the stage. Bravo and Benedetti each led over one of the day's two climbs, with a tie between the two on points in the mountains classification, with the day's general classification standings ultimately being the tie-breaker; ultimately, it was Bravo that finished highest, and thus he took the race's first green jersey. He would drop back from the lead trio first, thus leaving Benedetti and Hulsmans to continue on, at the head of the race. Race leader Mark Cavendish, the winner in Indicatore in 2012, was able to gain a second at the first intermediate sprint, to establish a virtual one-second lead on the road.

Cavendish added a further two seconds at the second intermediate sprint point – won by Cannondale's Maciej Bodnar – while his Omega Pharma–Quick-Step team-mate Michał Kwiatkowski was also able to gain a second at the sprint, in effect, boosting his own lead in the young rider classification. On the penultimate lap, Blanco Pro Cycling's Sep Vanmarcke tried to establish a solo move in the heavy rain that had been falling for most of the stage, but was caught by the main field after several kilometres off the front. Cannondale moved to the front of the peloton on the final lap, hoping to set up Peter Sagan for the sprint finish. Lotto–Belisol led the sprint out in the closing metres for André Greipel, but first Sagan and then Orica–GreenEDGE's Matthew Goss both came past him, with Goss ultimately taking the stage win on the line – his first win of the season – ahead of Ag2r–La Mondiale's Manuel Belletti and Gerald Ciolek, riding for World Tour débutants MTN–Qhubeka. Cavendish maintained the leader's jersey after finishing fifth in the sprint – criticising his team's lead-out in the process – while Greipel and Sagan finished seventh and ninth respectively.

Stage 2 Result

	Rider	Team	Time
1	Matthew Goss (AUS)	Orica–GreenEDGE	5h 48' 41"
2	Manuel Belletti (ITA)	Ag2r–La Mondiale	s.t.
3	Gerald Ciolek (GER)	MTN–Qhubeka	s.t.
4	Roberto Ferrari (ITA)	Lampre–Merida	s.t.
5	Mark Cavendish (GBR)	Omega Pharma–Quick-Step	s.t.
6	Arnaud Démare (FRA)	FDJ	s.t.
7	André Greipel (GER)	Lotto–Belisol	s.t.
8	Kristian Sbaragli (ITA)	MTN–Qhubeka	s.t.
9	Peter Sagan (SVK)	Cannondale	s.t.
10	Davide Appollonio (ITA)	Ag2r–La Mondiale	s.t.

General Classification after Stage 2

	Rider	Team	Time
1	Mark Cavendish (GBR)	Omega Pharma–Quick-Step	6h 08' 02"
2	Michał Kwiatkowski (POL)	Omega Pharma–Quick-Step	+ 2"
3	Niki Terpstra (NED)	Omega Pharma–Quick-Step	+ 3"
4	Tony Martin (GER)	Omega Pharma–Quick-Step	+ 3"
5	Zdeněk Štybar (CZE)	Omega Pharma–Quick-Step	+ 3"
6	Giovanni Visconti (ITA)	Movistar Team	+ 14"
7	Alex Dowsett (GBR)	Movistar Team	+ 14"
8	Juan José Cobo (ESP)	Movistar Team	+ 14"
9	Beñat Intxausti (ESP)	Movistar Team	+ 14"
10	Eros Capecchi (ITA)	Movistar Team	+ 14"

=== Stage 3 ===
8 March 2013 — Indicatore to Narni Scalo, 190 km (118.1 mi)

For the second stage running, the stage was set up for sprinters, with only one categorised climb during the 190 km (118.1 mi) parcours. The climb itself – situated in the town of Todi – was short and steep, averaging 12.2% over 1.5 km (0.9 mi) of climbing. The remaining 70 km (43.5 mi) of the stage after the climb, were undulating around Narni and Narni Scalo. After a 22 km (13.7 mi) circuit towards the finish, the riders completed a final loop of 7.6 km (4.7 mi) before reaching the finish. For the second day running, NetApp–Endura rider Cesare Benedetti and mountains classification leader Garikoitz Bravo of the Euskaltel–Euskadi team both made it into the day's breakaway, where again they were joined by a member of the Vini Fantini–Selle Italia team, with Francesco Failli completing the lead trio. The trio quickly established an advantage over the main field, which they extended to around nine minutes before the climb at Todi, where Benedetti was able to take the green jersey from Bravo.

Benedetti was able to do so, as he led over the top of the climb ahead of Failli and Bravo. At this point, Bravo departed the breakaway and returned to the main field. Benedetti and Failli continued apace out front, while the peloton slowly brought the peloton back, in order to not catch the leaders too quickly and create opportunities for riders to attack before the finish in Narni Scalo. Cannondale were mainstays at the front of the group, hoping to set up a sprint for Peter Sagan. As wet conditions hit the race once again, several mini-attacks occurred on the run-in to the finish, with Blanco Pro Cycling's Lars Boom heading onto the final circuit with a small lead over the peloton. His attack was brought back before the end, as were solo attacks by Failli's team-mate Matteo Rabottini and Vacansoleil–DCM's Sergey Lagutin – the latter's attempt ending inside the final kilometre – setting up the final sprint. Matthew Goss, in the red jersey for points classification leader, for Orica–GreenEDGE launched his sprint first, but Gerald Ciolek (MTN–Qhubeka) came past him on the outside, before fading. Sagan and race leader Mark Cavendish (Omega Pharma–Quick-Step) also came past him, with the former winning on the line, beating Cavendish for the first time in a head-to-head sprint. Cavendish extended his overall lead with bonus seconds on offer for second place, while taking the points lead from Goss.

Stage 3 Result

	Rider	Team	Time
1	Peter Sagan (SVK)	Cannondale	5h 15' 12"
2	Mark Cavendish (GBR)	Omega Pharma–Quick-Step	s.t.
3	André Greipel (GER)	Lotto–Belisol	s.t.
4	Gerald Ciolek (GER)	MTN–Qhubeka	s.t.
5	Matthew Goss (AUS)	Orica–GreenEDGE	s.t.
6	Davide Cimolai (ITA)	Lampre–Merida	s.t.
7	Tyler Farrar (USA)	Garmin–Sharp	s.t.
8	Thor Hushovd (NOR)	BMC Racing Team	s.t.
9	Manuel Belletti (ITA)	Ag2r–La Mondiale	s.t.
10	Simon Geschke (GER)	Argos–Shimano	s.t.

General Classification after Stage 3

	Rider	Team	Time
1	Mark Cavendish (GBR)	Omega Pharma–Quick-Step	11h 23' 08"
2	Michał Kwiatkowski (POL)	Omega Pharma–Quick-Step	+ 7"
3	Niki Terpstra (NED)	Omega Pharma–Quick-Step	+ 9"
4	Tony Martin (GER)	Omega Pharma–Quick-Step	+ 9"
5	Zdeněk Štybar (CZE)	Omega Pharma–Quick-Step	+ 9"
6	Peter Sagan (SVK)	Cannondale	+ 18"
7	Alex Dowsett (GBR)	Movistar Team	+ 20"
8	Giovanni Visconti (ITA)	Movistar Team	+ 20"
9	Beñat Intxausti (ESP)	Movistar Team	+ 20"
10	Juan José Cobo (ESP)	Movistar Team	+ 20"

=== Stage 4 ===
9 March 2013 — Narni to Prati di Tivo, 173 km (107.5 mi)

The queen stage of the 2013 Tirreno–Adriatico, the fourth stage saw the summit finish at Prati di Tivo for the second consecutive year, where Vincenzo Nibali soloed away to a sixteen-second victory after attacking with 4 km (2.5 mi) left to climb, en route to winning the race overall in the final individual time trial stage. From the start in Narni, the 173 km (107.5 mi) parcours steadily rose, with three categorised climbs as part of the itinerary; the Forca di Arrone and the Capannelle Pass were both ascented but were not major tests to the riders, as both had average gradients of lower than 5%, but this was the preparation to the climb to Prati di Tivo. The 14.6 km (9.1 mi) long climb reached a gradient of 12% at its lower slopes, but the gradient averaged 7.1% for the duration. There was also the second of the day's intermediate sprints during the climb, at Pietracamela, coming with just under 6 km (3.7 mi) remaining.

Four riders – Astana's Fredrik Kessiakoff, Anthony Roux (FDJ), Tomasz Marczyński of Vacansoleil–DCM, and for the second day running, Francesco Failli riding for the Vini Fantini–Selle Italia team – advanced clear of the main field after 20 km (12.4 mi) of the stage, and managed to extend their advantage to a maximum of about seven minutes around a third of the way into the stage. Failli was in the breakaway to try and take the mountains classification lead away from NetApp–Endura's Cesare Benedetti, and ultimately did so, after taking maximum points at the first two climbs on the route. Omega Pharma–Quick-Step and the BMC Racing Team moved to the front of the peloton behind, keeping their respective protected riders out of danger, prior to the final climb. The lead quartet held a lead of under two minutes at the foot of the climb, with the peloton closing quickly.

With such a pace behind, Marczyński went off the front on his own, in order to prevent himself being caught for as long as possible. He held a lead of around 45 seconds with 9 km (5.6 mi) remaining, as Team Sky led the chase in the peloton with five riders on the front, protecting Chris Froome, who was one of the favourites for the stage. Marczyński was caught not long after, with Team Sky's pace reducing numbers in the peloton drastically, with Cadel Evans, Joaquim Rodríguez and Roman Kreuziger among those dropped. Saxo–Tinkoff rider Alberto Contador tried several times to get clear, and at one point, had formed a group with Nibali and Failli's team-mate Mauro Santambrogio. Froome was able to get back to them with assistance from RadioShack–Leopard's Chris Horner, and countered over the top of the group, and soloed away to a six-second margin of victory, ahead of Santambrogio who finished second, with Nibali in third. Michał Kwiatkowski kept the azzurra jersey with Omega Pharma–Quick-Step, finishing the stage fourth, to take the jersey from team-mate Mark Cavendish.

Stage 4 Result

	Rider	Team	Time
1	Chris Froome (GBR)	Team Sky	4h 41' 31"
2	Mauro Santambrogio (ITA)	Vini Fantini–Selle Italia	+ 6"
3	Vincenzo Nibali (ITA)	Astana	+ 11"
4	Michał Kwiatkowski (POL)	Omega Pharma–Quick-Step	+ 13"
5	Chris Horner (USA)	RadioShack–Leopard	+ 15"
6	Alberto Contador (ESP)	Saxo–Tinkoff	+ 15"
7	Rigoberto Urán (COL)	Team Sky	+ 20"
8	Wout Poels (NED)	Vacansoleil–DCM	+ 43"
9	Joaquim Rodríguez (ESP)	Team Katusha	+ 43"
10	Roman Kreuziger (CZE)	Saxo–Tinkoff	+ 58"

General Classification after Stage 4

	Rider	Team	Time
1	Michał Kwiatkowski (POL)	Omega Pharma–Quick-Step	16h 04' 59"
2	Chris Froome (GBR)	Team Sky	+ 4"
3	Vincenzo Nibali (ITA)	Astana	+ 16"
4	Alberto Contador (ESP)	Saxo–Tinkoff	+ 30"
5	Rigoberto Urán (COL)	Team Sky	+ 33"
6	Chris Horner (USA)	RadioShack–Leopard	+ 40"
7	Mauro Santambrogio (ITA)	Vini Fantini–Selle Italia	+ 55"
8	Jonathan Castroviejo (ESP)	Movistar Team	+ 1' 04"
9	Roman Kreuziger (CZE)	Saxo–Tinkoff	+ 1' 16"
10	Joaquim Rodríguez (ESP)	Team Katusha	+ 1' 16"

=== Stage 5 ===
10 March 2013 — Ortona to Chieti, 230 km (142.9 mi)

The race finished in Chieti for the fourth successive year, after a long day in the saddle for the peloton. After a lumpy parcours out of the start town of Ortona, the riders had to wait some 90 km (55.9 mi) for the first of three categorised climbs on the day. The first climb, the Forchetta di Palena, was not excessive steep at an average gradient of 3.3% but the climb itself was long and laborious at 21.7 km (13.5 mi) long. After a substantial descent, the riders headed towards the second climb via the first of two intermediate sprint points at Lettomanoppello, before the steep Passo Lanciano. The Lanciano, 11.3 km (7.0 mi) at 8.6%, was introduced by race organisers for the 2013 edition in order to make the run in to Chieti more demanding than before. Upon arriving in Chieti, there were two steep climbs in the final 7.5 km (4.7 mi); the first, averaging 7.7%, led up to the second intermediate sprint, and the second – after a short descent – averaged over 12% for 1,200 metres (3,900 ft), reaching 19% in places. Upon cresting the top of the climb, there was a false flat to the finish on the Via Salomone.

Nine riders formed the day's breakaway after 20 km (12.4 mi) of racing, with the advantage that they held increasing to a maximum of over eight minutes at the top of the first climb on the day. Omega Pharma–Quick-Step, Team Sky and Cannondale were keeping station at the front of the peloton, while at the front, Lampre–Merida's Damiano Cunego attacked on the Passo Lanciano, while RadioShack–Leopard rider Stijn Devolder attempted to chase him down. Cunego's solo move was ultimately unsuccessful, as he was the last member of the breakaway to be brought back by the peloton with around 7 km (4.3 mi) remaining. Team Sky's pace on the front was reducing numbers in the peloton, with 2012 Chieti winner Peter Sagan (Cannondale) being dropped. After a move from Saxo–Tinkoff's Roman Kreuziger and the Movistar Team's Andrey Amador was brought back, Joaquim Rodríguez (Team Katusha) saw his chance to attack with 1.4 km (0.9 mi) to go. He got a gap, and soloed away to his second victory of the season. A group of five riders came across the line eight seconds in arrears, with Chris Froome (Team Sky) among them, to take the leader's blue jersey from Omega Pharma–Quick-Step's Michał Kwiatkowski.

Stage 5 Result

	Rider	Team	Time
1	Joaquim Rodríguez (ESP)	Team Katusha	6h 06' 43"
2	Bauke Mollema (NED)	Blanco Pro Cycling	+ 8"
3	Alberto Contador (ESP)	Saxo–Tinkoff	+ 8"
4	Mauro Santambrogio (ITA)	Vini Fantini–Selle Italia	+ 8"
5	Chris Horner (USA)	RadioShack–Leopard	+ 8"
6	Chris Froome (GBR)	Team Sky	+ 8"
7	Vincenzo Nibali (ITA)	Astana	+ 17"
8	Przemysław Niemiec (POL)	Lampre–Merida	+ 22"
9	Roman Kreuziger (CZE)	Saxo–Tinkoff	+ 22"
10	Dan Martin (IRE)	Garmin–Sharp	+ 28"

General Classification after Stage 5

	Rider	Team	Time
1	Chris Froome (GBR)	Team Sky	22h 11' 53"
2	Alberto Contador (ESP)	Saxo–Tinkoff	+ 20"
3	Vincenzo Nibali (ITA)	Astana	+ 20"
4	Michał Kwiatkowski (POL)	Omega Pharma–Quick-Step	+ 24"
5	Chris Horner (USA)	RadioShack–Leopard	+ 37"
6	Mauro Santambrogio (ITA)	Vini Fantini–Selle Italia	+ 52"
7	Joaquim Rodríguez (ESP)	Team Katusha	+ 55"
8	Rigoberto Urán (COL)	Team Sky	+ 57"
9	Roman Kreuziger (CZE)	Saxo–Tinkoff	+ 1' 27"
10	Sergio Henao (COL)	Team Sky	+ 1' 51"

=== Stage 6 ===
11 March 2013 — Porto Sant'Elpidio to Porto Sant'Elpidio, 209 km (129.9 mi)

The penultimate stage of the race was held as a circuit race around Porto Sant'Elpidio, with an itinerary of 209 km (129.9 mi) being held over two separate circuits. Firstly, the riders completed two laps of a circuit 91.2 km (56.7 mi) in length – 3.2 km (2.0 mi) were covered in the neutral zone before the real start of the stage – before the peloton turned onto another circuit, this time 29.8 km (18.5 mi) in length, towards the stage finish back along the Adriatic coast. On each lap, the riders had to ascent a climb in Sant'Elpidio a Mare; on the first two laps, the climb was 3 km (1.9 mi) long and averaging 6.1%, while on the final lap, it was a more gradual 2.9% after approaching from a different direction. These figures were dwarfed in comparison to the maximum gradient of the climb, listed by race organisers as reaching 27%.

Continuing a theme that has occurred throughout the race, wet conditions greeted the riders in Porto Sant'Elpidio for the start of the stage. The breakaway of the day was sizable, as sixteen riders made up the group. With such a large group, the peloton did not allow for a large gap to be created over themselves, keeping the gap below four minutes for the majority of the stage, before reaching an absolute maximum of around four-and-a-half minutes. With around 50 km (31.1 mi) remaining, Argos–Shimano's Tom Dumoulin and Damiano Cunego of Lampre–Merida attacked out of the lead group, hitting the climb in Sant'Elpidio a Mare off the front. Five riders were able to rejoin the lead duo, as the peloton continually closed down on the group. Dumoulin attacked again on the final ascent of the climb, and was joined by the Movistar Team's Beñat Intxausti. Intxausti soon left Dumoulin and crossed the top of the climb first.

He was later joined on the descent by the defending champion Vincenzo Nibali of Astana and Euskaltel–Euskadi's Samuel Sánchez, known as two of the best descenders in the peloton. Cannondale's Peter Sagan also joined them, after the peloton had been led by his team to keep him out of any available danger on the wet roads. Intxausti and Sánchez were both later dropped from the lead group, while the previous day's stage winner Joaquim Rodríguez (Team Katusha) soon bridged up to the group from a separate group of chasers, among them was the points classification leader, Saxo–Tinkoff rider Alberto Contador. Sagan was ultimately strongest for the finish, taking his second stage victory of the week, and further adding to his favourite tag for Milan–San Remo. Nibali and Rodríguez followed two seconds behind, and with Chris Froome (Team Sky) losing forty-eight seconds to Nibali, the Astana rider moved into the azzurra jersey ahead of the final time trial. Nearly a third of the peloton abandoned the race during the stage due to the conditions, to which race director Michele Acquarone apologised for, on social networking service Twitter.

Stage 6 Result

	Rider	Team	Time
1	Peter Sagan (SVK)	Cannondale	5h 45' 17"
2	Vincenzo Nibali (ITA)	Astana	+ 2"
3	Joaquim Rodríguez (ESP)	Team Katusha	+ 2"
4	Mauro Santambrogio (ITA)	Vini Fantini–Selle Italia	+ 44"
5	Samuel Sánchez (ESP)	Euskaltel–Euskadi	+ 44"
6	Chris Horner (USA)	RadioShack–Leopard	+ 44"
7	Alberto Contador (ESP)	Saxo–Tinkoff	+ 44"
8	Jürgen Roelandts (BEL)	Lotto–Belisol	+ 50"
9	Thor Hushovd (NOR)	BMC Racing Team	+ 50"
10	Simon Geschke (GER)	Argos–Shimano	+ 50"

General Classification after Stage 6

	Rider	Team	Time
1	Vincenzo Nibali (ITA)	Astana	27h 57' 26"
2	Chris Froome (GBR)	Team Sky	+ 34"
3	Joaquim Rodríguez (ESP)	Team Katusha	+ 37"
4	Alberto Contador (ESP)	Saxo–Tinkoff	+ 48"
5	Michał Kwiatkowski (POL)	Omega Pharma–Quick-Step	+ 58"
6	Chris Horner (USA)	RadioShack–Leopard	+ 1' 05"
7	Mauro Santambrogio (ITA)	Vini Fantini–Selle Italia	+ 1' 20"
8	Przemysław Niemiec (POL)	Lampre–Merida	+ 2' 54"
9	Andrey Amador (CRC)	Movistar Team	+ 2' 58"
10	Wout Poels (NED)	Vacansoleil–DCM	+ 3' 08"

=== Stage 7 ===
12 March 2013 — San Benedetto del Tronto, 9.2 km (5.7 mi) individual time trial (ITT)

Tirreno–Adriatico ended with an individual time trial in San Benedetto del Tronto for the third successive year, with the Marche city playing host to a perfectly flat out-and-back ride right along the Adriatic coast; it was held on the largely the same course as the 2011 and 2012 editions – although 100 m (330 ft) shorter in 2013 – won on both occasions by Fabian Cancellara, winning in times of 10' 33" and 10' 36" respectively. Cancellara of the RadioShack–Leopard team and Omega Pharma–Quick-Step's Tony Martin were regarded as the pre-stage favourites, while in the battle for the overall race victory, it was expected that Vincenzo Nibali (Astana) would win the race for the second successive year, having overturned a six-second deficit to Cancellara's team-mate Chris Horner to win the race in the time trial, in 2012.

As was customary of time trial stages, cyclists set off in reverse order from where they were ranked in the general classification at the end of the previous stage. Thus, Martin Velits of Omega Pharma–Quick-Step, who, in 108th place, trailed overall leader Nibali by one hour, fifteen minutes and thirty-eight seconds, was the first rider to set off on the final stage. Velits set a time of 11' 25" for the course, but was immediately beaten by Orica–GreenEDGE's Jens Mouris, who went inside the 11-minute barrier, with a time of 10' 52". His time held on top for around half an hour, before being bettered twice within the space of a minute by two RadioShack–Leopard team-mates, Hayden Roulston and Cancellara. Roulston went seven seconds quicker than Mouris to take top spot, but Cancellara went eight quicker than Roulston to assume top spot in a time of 10' 37". Lampre–Merida's Adriano Malori deposed Cancellara of the fastest time not long after, with a time of 10' 31", but ultimately, Martin improved upon that time, setting an eventual stage-winning time of 10' 25", passing his minute man Egoi Martínez (Euskaltel–Euskadi) on the stage. This gave Martin his second time trial win of the season, having won a final day time trial at the Volta ao Algarve.

The focus then moved to the overall battle, with Andrey Amador of the Movistar Team taking eighth place from Malori's team-mate Przemysław Niemiec, after Amador recorded the third fastest time for the stage. The final place on the overall podium was also settled on the stage, with three riders within twenty-one seconds of one another, pre-stage. Young rider classification leader Michał Kwiatkowski (Omega Pharma–Quick-Step), fifth overall overnight, set a target of 10' 46" for the other riders to follow. Points classification leader Alberto Contador of Saxo–Tinkoff was next across the line, going nine seconds slower than Kwiatkowski, but doing enough to stay ahead of him by one second. Team Katusha's Joaquim Rodríguez recorded a time of 11' 08" for the course, but was not good enough to remain ahead of Contador and Kwiatkowski, missing the podium by two seconds, leaving him disappointed. Chris Froome (Team Sky) set a time of 10' 40" for Nibali to chase in the battle for the victory, which Nibali prevailed in, losing around a third of his 34-second overnight lead on the stage.

Stage 7 Result

	Rider	Team	Time
1	Tony Martin (GER)	Omega Pharma–Quick-Step	10' 25"
2	Adriano Malori (ITA)	Lampre–Merida	+ 6"
3	Andrey Amador (CRC)	Movistar Team	+ 10"
4	Fabian Cancellara (SUI)	RadioShack–Leopard	+ 12"
5	Jonathan Castroviejo (ESP)	Movistar Team	+ 14"
6	Chris Froome (GBR)	Team Sky	+ 15"
7	Hayden Roulston (NZL)	RadioShack–Leopard	+ 20"
8	Michał Kwiatkowski (POL)	Omega Pharma–Quick-Step	+ 21"
9	Dario Cataldo (ITA)	Team Sky	+ 23"
10	Alex Dowsett (GBR)	Movistar Team	+ 23"

Final General Classification

	Rider	Team	Time
1	Vincenzo Nibali (ITA)	Astana	28h 08' 17"
2	Chris Froome (GBR)	Team Sky	+ 23"
3	Alberto Contador (ESP)	Saxo–Tinkoff	+ 52"
4	Michał Kwiatkowski (POL)	Omega Pharma–Quick-Step	+ 53"
5	Joaquim Rodríguez (ESP)	Team Katusha	+ 54"
6	Chris Horner (USA)	RadioShack–Leopard	+ 1' 21"
7	Mauro Santambrogio (ITA)	Vini Fantini–Selle Italia	+ 2' 03"
8	Andrey Amador (CRC)	Movistar Team	+ 2' 42"
9	Przemysław Niemiec (POL)	Lampre–Merida	+ 3' 19"
10	Wout Poels (NED)	Vacansoleil–DCM	+ 3' 35"

== Classification leadership table ==
In the Tirreno–Adriatico, four different jerseys were awarded. For the general classification, calculated by adding each cyclist's finishing times on each stage, and allowing time bonuses in intermediate sprints and at the finish in mass-start stages, the leader received a blue jersey. This classification was considered the most important of the 2013 Tirreno–Adriatico, and the winner was considered the winner of the race itself.

Additionally, there was a points classification, which awarded a red jersey. In the points classification, cyclists got points for finishing in the top ten in a stage. The stage win awarded 12 points, second place awarded 10 points, third 8, and one point fewer per place down the line, to a single point for tenth. In addition, the first four riders across the intermediate sprint lines earned points, 5, 3, 2, and 1 in succession.

There was also a mountains classification, which awarded a green jersey. In the mountains classification, points were won by reaching the top of a mountain before other cyclists. There were twelve recognised climbs in the race, and unlike most other races, the climbs were not separated into categories – each awarded the same points to the first four riders over its summit, on a scale of 5, 3, 2, and 1 in succession.

The fourth jersey represented the young rider classification, marked by a white jersey. This was decided the same way as the general classification, but only riders born after 1 January 1988 were eligible to be ranked in the classification.

There was also a classification for teams, in which the times of the best three cyclists per team on each stage were added together; the leading team at the end of the race was the team with the lowest total time.

Stage	Winner	General Classification	Points Classification	Mountains Classification	Young Riders Classification	Team Classification
1	Omega Pharma–Quick-Step	Mark Cavendish	not awarded	not awarded	Michał Kwiatkowski	Omega Pharma–Quick-Step
2	Matthew Goss	Mark Cavendish	Matthew Goss	Garikoitz Bravo	Michał Kwiatkowski	Omega Pharma–Quick-Step
3	Peter Sagan	Mark Cavendish	Mark Cavendish	Cesare Benedetti	Michał Kwiatkowski	Omega Pharma–Quick-Step
4	Chris Froome	Michał Kwiatkowski	Mark Cavendish	Francesco Failli	Michał Kwiatkowski	Team Sky
5	Joaquim Rodríguez	Chris Froome	Alberto Contador	Cesare Benedetti	Michał Kwiatkowski	Team Sky
6	Peter Sagan	Vincenzo Nibali	Alberto Contador	Damiano Cunego	Michał Kwiatkowski	Movistar Team
7	Tony Martin	Vincenzo Nibali	Alberto Contador	Damiano Cunego	Michał Kwiatkowski	Movistar Team
Final		Vincenzo Nibali	Alberto Contador	Damiano Cunego	Michał Kwiatkowski	Movistar Team

== Final standings ==
=== General Classification ===
	Rider	Team	Time
1	Vincenzo Nibali (ITA)	Astana	28h 08' 17"
2	Chris Froome (GBR)	Team Sky	+ 23"
3	Alberto Contador (ESP)	Saxo–Tinkoff	+ 52"
4	Michał Kwiatkowski (POL)	Omega Pharma–Quick-Step	+ 53"
5	Joaquim Rodríguez (ESP)	Team Katusha	+ 54"
6	Chris Horner (USA)	RadioShack–Leopard	+ 1' 21"
7	Mauro Santambrogio (ITA)	Vini Fantini–Selle Italia	+ 2' 03"
8	Andrey Amador (CRC)	Movistar Team	+ 2' 42"
9	Przemysław Niemiec (POL)	Lampre–Merida	+ 3' 19"
10	Wout Poels (NED)	Vacansoleil–DCM	+ 3' 35"

=== Points Classification ===
	Rider	Team	Points
1	Alberto Contador (ESP)	Saxo–Tinkoff	27
2	Peter Sagan (SVK)	Cannondale	26
3	Chris Froome (GBR)	Team Sky	25

=== King of the Mountains Classification ===
	Rider	Team	Points
1	Damiano Cunego (ITA)	Lampre–Merida	20
2	Cesare Benedetti (ITA)	NetApp–Endura	13
3	Garikoitz Bravo (ESP)	Euskaltel–Euskadi	10

=== Young Rider Classification ===
	Rider	Team	Time
1	Michał Kwiatkowski (POL)	Omega Pharma–Quick-Step	28h 09' 10"
2	Tom-Jelte Slagter (NED)	Blanco Pro Cycling	+ 16' 34"
3	Arthur Vichot (FRA)	FDJ	+ 16' 47"
