= 2012 Tirreno–Adriatico =

2012 UCI World Tour, race 3 of 28
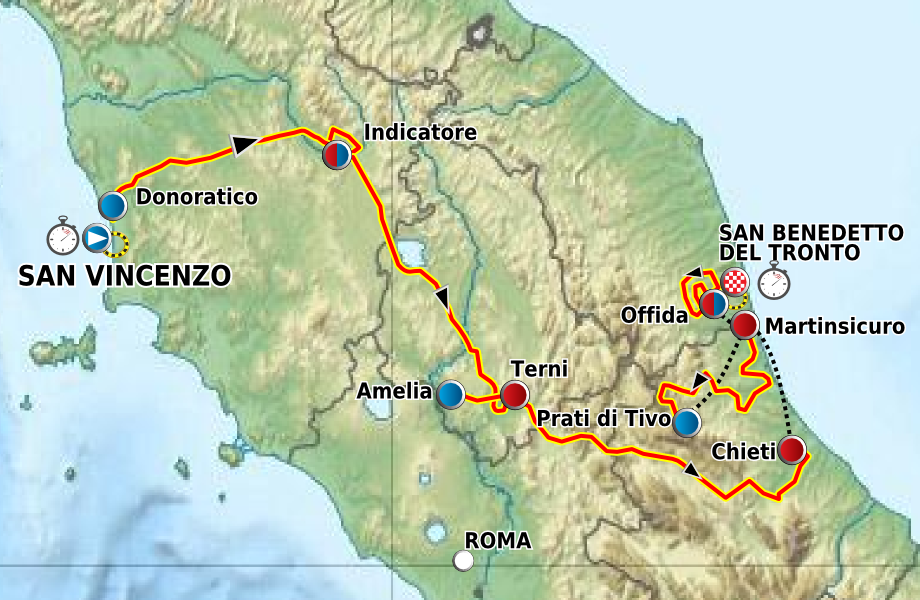

Race details
- Dates: 7–13 March 2012
- Stages: 7
- Distance: 1,062.2 km (660.0 mi)
- Winning time: 29h 38' 08"

Results
Jersey awarded to the overall winner	Winner	Vincenzo Nibali (ITA)	(Liquigas–Cannondale)
	Second	Chris Horner (USA)	(RadioShack–Nissan)
	Third	Roman Kreuziger (CZE)	(Astana)
Jersey awarded to the points classification winner	Points	Vincenzo Nibali (ITA)	(Liquigas–Cannondale)
Jersey awarded to the mountains classification winner	Mountains	Stefano Pirazzi (ITA)	(Colnago–CSF Bardiani)
Jersey awarded to the young rider classification winner	Young rider	Wout Poels (NED)	(Vacansoleil–DCM)
	Team	Ag2r–La Mondiale	

The 2012 Tirreno–Adriatico was the 47th running of the Tirreno–Adriatico cycling stage race, often known as the Race of two seas. It started on 7 March in Donoratico and ended on 13 March in San Benedetto del Tronto and consisted of seven stages, including a team time trial to begin the race and an individual time trial to conclude it. It was the third race of the 2012 UCI World Tour season.

The race was won by Italy's Vincenzo Nibali of Liquigas–Cannondale, after recording a quicker time in the race-ending time trial than RadioShack–Nissan's Chris Horner and Astana's Roman Kreuziger, and overhauled both riders for victory; during the race, Nibali also won the race's queen stage to Prati di Tivo. Nibali also took home the red jersey for amassing the highest number of points during stages at intermediate sprints and stage finishes, and won the general classification by fourteen seconds over runner-up Horner. Kreuziger completed the podium, 12 seconds behind Horner and 26 seconds down on Nibali.

In the race's other classifications, Wout Poels of Vacansoleil–DCM won the white jersey for the highest placed rider born in 1987 or later by placing eighth overall in the general classification, while Colnago–CSF Bardiani rider Stefano Pirazzi won the King of the Mountains classification, and Ag2r–La Mondiale finished at the head of the teams classification.

== Teams ==
As Tirreno–Adriatico was a UCI World Tour event, all 18 UCI ProTeams were invited automatically and obligated to send a squad. Four other squads were given wildcard places into the race, and as such, formed the event's 22-team peloton.

The 22 teams that competed in the race were:

- Ag2r–La Mondiale
- Astana
- BMC Racing Team
- Euskaltel–Euskadi
- FDJ–BigMat
- Garmin–Barracuda
- GreenEDGE
- Team Katusha
- Lampre–ISD
- Liquigas–Cannondale
- Lotto–Belisol
- Movistar Team
- Omega Pharma–Quick-Step
- Rabobank
- RadioShack–Nissan
- Team Sky
- Team Saxo Bank
- Vacansoleil–DCM
- Acqua & Sapone
- Colnago–CSF Bardiani
- Colombia–Coldeportes
- Farnese Vini–Selle Italia

== Stages ==
=== Stage 1 ===
7 March 2012 — San Vincenzo to Donoratico, 16.9 km (10.5 mi), team time trial (TTT)

Following the introduction of a race-opening team time trial by organisers in 2011, the 2012 event began in the same fashion with a short test between the towns of San Vincenzo and Donoratico; both of which are synonymous within Italian cycling as the start and finish towns of the early-season Gran Premio della Costa Etruschi race. Team Saxo Bank were the first team to set off from the start, and set the early benchmark with a time of 19' 19", but only held the top spot for a short period. The third team on the course, Garmin–Barracuda – winners of the 2011 Tour de France team time trial, and a time trial in February's Tour of Qatar – were touted as favourites for the stage by several team personnel, and lived up to that, as the team went under the nineteen-minute barrier, with a time of 18' 58". Another fancied team was Team Sky, but they fell six seconds shy of the time of Garmin–Barracuda.

After struggling to maintain five riders in the train during the 2011 team time trial as Leopard Trek, RadioShack–Nissan were once again highly tipped, with four-time world time trial champion Fabian Cancellara among their ranks, and only just claimed the lead from Garmin–Barracuda, besting their time by less than a second. However, the eventual stage-winning time came from the GreenEDGE team, newly formed for the 2012 season. Following practice for the discipline prior to the race, GreenEDGE came into the race with no real contender for the overall race but set a goal to win the team time trial; the team met their goal, recording a time of 18' 41", surpassing the mark of RadioShack–Nissan by seventeen seconds. As Matthew Goss was the first of the team's riders to cross the line, he was entitled to wear the race's first azzurra jersey, while Cameron Meyer was also part of the train at the finish and thus was the best placed rider under the age of 25. Sporting director Matt White later expressed his delight at the team's run, and was surprised at the team's large margin of victory.

Outside of the top five placed teams, as Roman Kreuziger's Astana team rounded out the top five, several of the teams with general classification favourites suffered arduous runs in the stage. Defending race-winner Cadel Evans' BMC Racing Team and 2011 team time trial winners Rabobank were caught out due to atmospheric conditions; a change in wind direction caused both teams to lose almost a minute to GreenEDGE on the stage, finishing 16th and 17th respectively of the 22 teams contesting the race. Lampre–ISD and Liquigas–Cannondale, the teams of the main Italian hopes for the race – Michele Scarponi and Vincenzo Nibali – also lost more than 45 seconds to the stage-winners. Lampre–ISD finished eleventh, while Liquigas–Cannondale recorded a fifteenth-place finish on the stage.

Stage 1 Result

	Team	Time
1	GreenEDGE	18' 41"
2	RadioShack–Nissan	+ 17"
3	Garmin–Barracuda	+ 17"
4	Team Sky	+ 23"
5	Astana	+ 30"
6	Team Saxo Bank	+ 38"
7	Acqua & Sapone	+ 39"
8	Team Katusha	+ 40"
9	Ag2r–La Mondiale	+ 43"
10	Lotto–Belisol	+ 45"

General Classification after Stage 1

	Rider	Team	Time
1	Matthew Goss (AUS)	GreenEDGE	18' 41"
2	Svein Tuft (CAN)	GreenEDGE	+ 0"
3	Sebastian Langeveld (NED)	GreenEDGE	+ 0"
4	Stuart O'Grady (AUS)	GreenEDGE	+ 0"
5	Cameron Meyer (AUS)	GreenEDGE	+ 0"
6	Baden Cooke (AUS)	GreenEDGE	+ 5"
7	Daniele Bennati (ITA)	RadioShack–Nissan	+ 17"
8	Fabian Cancellara (SUI)	RadioShack–Nissan	+ 17"
9	Hayden Roulston (NZL)	RadioShack–Nissan	+ 17"
10	Tony Gallopin (FRA)	RadioShack–Nissan	+ 17"

=== Stage 2 ===
8 March 2012 — San Vincenzo to Indicatore, 230 km (142.9 mi)

Diego Caccia of Farnese Vini–Selle Italia instigated the breakaway of the day, and was joined shortly after by a rider from the Colnago–CSF Bardiani team, with Stefano Pirazzi joining Caccia out front. Caccia and Pirazzi quickly stepped up the pace to pull clear of the peloton, fronted by the GreenEDGE team of race leader Matthew Goss. By the time the lead duo reached the first climb of the race, coming after around 60 km (37.3 mi) in Volterra, with Pirazzi taking maximum points, their lead was close to eight minutes. GreenEDGE reduced their advantage steadily, with Svein Tuft controlling the tempo on the front of the main field, knocking the advantage down to five minutes by the second categorised climb after 106 km (65.9 mi). Pirazzi again crossed the line first ahead of Caccia, and thus guaranteed himself the first green jersey of the race for mountains classification leader. Their advantage stayed largely between four-and-a-half and five minutes before entering the finishing circuit, 33.4 km (20.8 mi) in length, at Indicatore for the first of two laps.

Team Sky and Omega Pharma–Quick-Step joined GreenEDGE at the head of the main field and set about cutting into the lead duo's advantage, and by the time the first lap was complete, the gap was under a minute; within the next 5 km (3.1 mi), the breakaway was over after around 200 km (124.3 mi) clear. With Team Sky again controlling the pace of the main pack, Yaroslav Popovych (RadioShack–Nissan) attacked inside the final 10 km (6.2 mi), causing two other riders – Enrico Gasparotto of Astana and Fabio Taborre of Acqua & Sapone – to follow suit, but all three were swallowed up shortly after. Gasparotto's team-mate Paolo Tiralongo then launched an attack with BMC Racing Team's Greg Van Avermaet at 3 km (1.9 mi) to go, but to no avail as they were both caught outside Indicatore. A large crash with 1.5 km (0.9 mi) to go reduced the number of contenders for the sprint, where Garmin–Barracuda tried to lead it out for Tyler Farrar, the stage-winner in Indicatore in 2011. Farrar held the lead until the closing metres as Mark Cavendish accelerated past him, following a lead-out from Edvald Boasson Hagen, to record his fourth victory of the season ahead of a closing Óscar Freire (Team Katusha) and Farrar. Cavendish moved into fifth place overall, and assumed the lead of the points classification.

Stage 2 Result

	Rider	Team	Time
1	Mark Cavendish (GBR)	Team Sky	6h 32' 32"
2	Óscar Freire (ESP)	Team Katusha	s.t.
3	Tyler Farrar (USA)	Garmin–Barracuda	s.t.
4	Peter Sagan (SVK)	Liquigas–Cannondale	s.t.
5	Sacha Modolo (ITA)	Colnago–CSF Bardiani	s.t.
6	Kenny van Hummel (NED)	Vacansoleil–DCM	s.t.
7	Danilo Napolitano (ITA)	Acqua & Sapone	s.t.
8	Borut Božič (SLO)	Astana	s.t.
9	William Bonnet (FRA)	FDJ–BigMat	s.t.
10	Rubén Pérez (ESP)	Euskaltel–Euskadi	s.t.

General Classification after Stage 2

	Rider	Team	Time
1	Matthew Goss (AUS)	GreenEDGE	6h 51' 13"
2	Stuart O'Grady (AUS)	GreenEDGE	+ 0"
3	Sebastian Langeveld (NED)	GreenEDGE	+ 0"
4	Cameron Meyer (AUS)	GreenEDGE	+ 0"
5	Mark Cavendish (GBR)	Team Sky	+ 13"
6	Tyler Farrar (USA)	Garmin–Barracuda	+ 13"
7	Daniele Bennati (ITA)	RadioShack–Nissan	+ 17"
8	Chris Horner (USA)	RadioShack–Nissan	+ 17"
9	Fabian Cancellara (SUI)	RadioShack–Nissan	+ 17"
10	Ramūnas Navardauskas (LTU)	Garmin–Barracuda	+ 17"

=== Stage 3 ===
9 March 2012 — Indicatore to Terni, 178 km (110.6 mi)

Colnago–CSF Bardiani rider Filippo Savini broke away from the field almost from the start of the stage, and managed to get clear without a breakaway companion. The main field decided not to follow him closely to begin with, as he was not a factor in the overall classification; over nine minutes behind overnight leader Matthew Goss of the GreenEDGE team. Savini's lead grew to over eleven minutes at one point during the stage, but due to windy conditions and the peloton stepping up the pace, it was quickly reduced to around 7' 30" with just over 100 km (62.1 mi) remaining on the stage. Savini gained maximum points on the road; crossing the line first at the two intermediate sprints – gaining six bonus seconds in the process – and also crested the climb at Todi first, with team-mate Stefano Pirazzi maintaining his lead in that competition by crossing second.

Savini's brave salvo off the front of the pack ended with around 30 km (18.6 mi), as BMC Racing Team led the chase of him during the stage. Many of the sprinters' teams launched themselves frontwards in order to set themselves up for the finish in Terni, coming on cobblestones in the town centre. With no further attacks getting away, it eventually came down to a sprint finish; Garmin–Barracuda looked to get Tyler Farrar the stage victory, but were caught out by an early sprint from Team Sky's Edvald Boasson Hagen, who had been expected to lead-out for team-mate Mark Cavendish, but with Cavendish not in his best shape – despite picking up two bonus seconds at an intermediate sprint – it was left to Boasson Hagen to contest for the honours; taking his team's tenth victory of the season. André Greipel was close behind in second for Lotto–Belisol, ahead of Liquigas–Cannondale's Peter Sagan, Farrar, Manuel Belletti (Ag2r–La Mondiale) and Goss, who maintained his race lead.

Stage 3 Result

	Rider	Team	Time
1	Edvald Boasson Hagen (NOR)	Team Sky	4h 45' 31"
2	André Greipel (GER)	Lotto–Belisol	s.t.
3	Peter Sagan (SVK)	Liquigas–Cannondale	s.t.
4	Tyler Farrar (USA)	Garmin–Barracuda	s.t.
5	Manuel Belletti (ITA)	Ag2r–La Mondiale	s.t.
6	Matthew Goss (AUS)	GreenEDGE	s.t.
7	Kenny van Hummel (NED)	Vacansoleil–DCM	s.t.
8	Francisco Ventoso (ESP)	Movistar Team	s.t.
9	Elia Favilli (ITA)	Farnese Vini–Selle Italia	s.t.
10	Wout Poels (NED)	Vacansoleil–DCM	+ 3"

General Classification after Stage 3

	Rider	Team	Time
1	Matthew Goss (AUS)	GreenEDGE	11h 36' 44"
2	Stuart O'Grady (AUS)	GreenEDGE	+ 3"
3	Cameron Meyer (AUS)	GreenEDGE	+ 3"
4	Sebastian Langeveld (NED)	GreenEDGE	+ 3"
5	Tyler Farrar (USA)	Garmin–Barracuda	+ 13"
6	Edvald Boasson Hagen (NOR)	Team Sky	+ 13"
7	Mark Cavendish (GBR)	Team Sky	+ 14"
8	Chris Horner (USA)	RadioShack–Nissan	+ 20"
9	Daniele Bennati (ITA)	RadioShack–Nissan	+ 20"
10	Fabian Cancellara (SUI)	RadioShack–Nissan	+ 20"

=== Stage 4 ===
10 March 2012 — Amelia to Chieti, 251 km (156.0 mi)

Prior to the running of the stage, its parcours was changed the night before due to poor weather conditions, although the slight rerouting reduced the stage's total distance to 251 km (156.0 mi). On the stage itself, seven riders from six different teams, including mountains classification leader Stefano Pirazzi formed a part of the breakaway. The main field decided not to follow them closely to begin with, with the lead increasing dramatically in the early stages, reaching an ultimate maximum gap of around twelve minutes. With Pirazzi in the lead group, it enabled the Colnago–CSF Bardiani rider to extend his already substantial lead in the mountains classification, taking maximum points on the first two climbs of the stage.

The peloton, led by a combined front between the Lampre–ISD, Colombia–Coldeportes, Omega Pharma–Quick-Step and Liquigas–Cannondale teams enabled the gap between the main field and the breakaway septet to be cut sufficiently, dropping under five minutes at the stage's halfway point, and by 36 km (22.4 mi) to go, the gap was just 90 seconds, and a catch seemed a certainty. With the peloton closing, Pavel Brutt (Team Katusha) and Manuele Boaro of Team Saxo Bank both launched solo attacks in order to maintain their move ahead of the advancing pack. Boaro and Brutt were both caught outside of 10 km (6.2 mi) to go before the finish in Chieti. Another crash split the field once again, and Liquigas–Cannondale continued to hold front at the head of the peloton as it moved towards the finish. Johnny Hoogerland launched a late attack for Vacansoleil–DCM, but was usurped by Acqua & Sapone's Danilo Di Luca and Liquigas–Cannondale rider Peter Sagan. Three other riders – Sagan's team-mate Vincenzo Nibali, Roman Kreuziger of Astana and RadioShack–Nissan rider Chris Horner – joined up with the lead duo, and this pentet did battle for the stage honours. Kreuziger and Nibali both launched bids for victory, but it was Sagan that prevailed, ultimately. Horner's gain for making this small group was to assume the race lead, from GreenEDGE's Matthew Goss.

Stage 4 Result

	Rider	Team	Time
1	Peter Sagan (SVK)	Liquigas–Cannondale	7h 24' 50"
2	Roman Kreuziger (CZE)	Astana	s.t.
3	Vincenzo Nibali (ITA)	Liquigas–Cannondale	s.t.
4	Danilo Di Luca (ITA)	Acqua & Sapone	s.t.
5	Chris Horner (USA)	RadioShack–Nissan	s.t.
6	Johnny Hoogerland (NED)	Vacansoleil–DCM	+ 8"
7	Rinaldo Nocentini (ITA)	Ag2r–La Mondiale	+ 10"
8	Cadel Evans (AUS)	BMC Racing Team	+ 12"
9	Michele Scarponi (ITA)	Lampre–ISD	+ 12"
10	Joaquim Rodríguez (ESP)	Team Katusha	+ 12"

General Classification after Stage 4

	Rider	Team	Time
1	Chris Horner (USA)	RadioShack–Nissan	19h 01' 54"
2	Roman Kreuziger (CZE)	Astana	+ 7"
3	Cameron Meyer (AUS)	GreenEDGE	+ 13"
4	Peter Sagan (SVK)	Liquigas–Cannondale	+ 21"
5	Danilo Di Luca (ITA)	Acqua & Sapone	+ 22"
6	Fabian Cancellara (SUI)	RadioShack–Nissan	+ 30"
7	Paolo Tiralongo (ITA)	Astana	+ 32"
8	Vincenzo Nibali (ITA)	Liquigas–Cannondale	+ 34"
9	Joaquim Rodríguez (ESP)	Team Katusha	+ 35"
10	Rinaldo Nocentini (ITA)	Ag2r–La Mondiale	+ 36"

=== Stage 5 ===
11 March 2012 — Martinsicuro to Prati di Tivo, 196 km (121.8 mi)

The race's queen stage consisted of three categorised climbs over the 196 km (121.8 mi) parcours, including two climbs to over 1,200 m (3,900 ft); the Piano Roseto, a climb of just over 20 km (12.4 mi), and also the climb to the mountain-top finish at Prati di Tivo, which crested out at 1,450 m (4,760 ft); a shorter climb of 14.5 km (9.0 mi), at an average gradient of just over 7%. Three riders – Lotto–Belisol's Jens Debusschere, Euskaltel–Euskadi rider Egoi Martínez and Kristof Goddaert of Ag2r–La Mondiale – advanced clear of the main field after 15 km (9.3 mi) of the stage, and managed to extend their advantage to a maximum of around ten-and-a-half minutes at one point during the early running of the stage. Goddaert was dropped on the Piano Roseto, as his two rivals looked to step up their pace in advance of the Liquigas–Cannondale-led peloton, who had been cutting into their lead quite effectively; reducing their gap out front from around 10' 30" at the start of the climb to a much smaller margin of 3' 30" by its conclusion.

The race was together once again not long after, as the two remaining escapees were brought back slowly into the main pack, which had numbers reducing by the kilometre. By the time that the field has reached the climb up to Prati di Tivo, around 25 riders remained in contention for the stage honours. After Martínez had been brought back, several mini-attacks were launched, most efficiently by Astana's Paolo Tiralongo in aspirations of potentially setting Roman Kreuziger up for a potential stage win or assuming the azzurra jersey from overnight leader Chris Horner of RadioShack–Nissan. Horner himself had elevated the pace in the lead group, and continued to shell riders from it. With around 4 km (2.5 mi) to ride in the stage, Vincenzo Nibali looked to avenge a disappointing showing in Chieti, by going on the offensive, and was not directly followed by any other rider from the main field. His gap quickly went to nearly 30 seconds, which would have put Horner in trouble to keep the jersey, but he increased the pace once again; Nibali's eventual winning margin was 16 seconds over Kreuziger, who cut another two seconds off Horner's lead overall, reducing the margin to just five seconds. Nibali also moved within twelve seconds of Horner.

Stage 5 Result

	Rider	Team	Time
1	Vincenzo Nibali (ITA)	Liquigas–Cannondale	5h 46' 33"
2	Roman Kreuziger (CZE)	Astana	+ 16"
3	Chris Horner (USA)	RadioShack–Nissan	+ 16"
4	Johnny Hoogerland (NED)	Vacansoleil–DCM	+ 18"
5	Michele Scarponi (ITA)	Lampre–ISD	+ 18"
6	Domenico Pozzovivo (ITA)	Colnago–CSF Bardiani	+ 18"
7	Rinaldo Nocentini (ITA)	Ag2r–La Mondiale	+ 23"
8	Joaquim Rodríguez (ESP)	Team Katusha	+ 37"
9	Christophe Riblon (FRA)	Ag2r–La Mondiale	+ 37"
10	Wout Poels (NED)	Vacansoleil–DCM	+ 53"

General Classification after Stage 5

	Rider	Team	Time
1	Chris Horner (USA)	RadioShack–Nissan	24h 48' 39"
2	Roman Kreuziger (CZE)	Astana	+ 5"
3	Vincenzo Nibali (ITA)	Liquigas–Cannondale	+ 12"
4	Rinaldo Nocentini (ITA)	Ag2r–La Mondiale	+ 45"
5	Michele Scarponi (ITA)	Lampre–ISD	+ 47"
6	Johnny Hoogerland (NED)	Vacansoleil–DCM	+ 48"
7	Joaquim Rodríguez (ESP)	Team Katusha	+ 1' 00"
8	Christophe Riblon (FRA)	Ag2r–La Mondiale	+ 1' 10"
9	Domenico Pozzovivo (ITA)	Colnago–CSF Bardiani	+ 1' 17"
10	Cameron Meyer (AUS)	GreenEDGE	+ 1' 23"

=== Stage 6 ===
12 March 2012 — Offida to Offida, 181 km (112.5 mi)

The final mass-start stage of the race revolved around a circuit race in and around Offida. After an opening loop of 84 km (52.2 mi), the riders returned to the centre of the commune for six laps of a circuit around 16 km (9.9 mi) in length. Each lap contained a climb of the Ponte delle Pietre, a 2.5 km (1.6 mi) long climb with an average gradient of over 7% – with certain sections of the climb maxing out at 10% – while the final kilometre saw a slight rise in the road at 2%, with riders also having to negotiate a left-hand corner on the Via Repubblica in the closing metres. A group of six riders got clear after around 3 km (1.9 mi), including world champion Mark Cavendish (Team Sky), but their move was quickly negated as the sextet could only muster an advantage of twenty seconds over the field. Cavendish later abandoned the race, in order to recover for the Milan – San Remo Monument classic on 17 March.

Around 40 km (24.9 mi) later, seven riders – Acqua & Sapone's Carlos Betancur, Luis Felipe Laverde of Colombia–Coldeportes, FDJ–BigMat rider Arthur Vichot, Movistar Team duo Andrey Amador and Branislau Samoilau, Serge Pauwels of Omega Pharma–Quick-Step and Vacansoleil–DCM's Mirko Selvaggi – went clear to form the day's primary breakaway. The breakaway held a lead of almost five minutes at one point, but with Team Katusha, Liquigas–Cannondale and Garmin–Barracuda all having riders that could contend at the stage finish, the gap tumbled away and the breakaway fractioned with only Amador, Vichot, Pauwels and Betancur surviving together, and were only caught inside of 6 km (3.7 mi) to go. Danilo Di Luca (Acqua & Sapone) and Michele Scarponi launched punchy attacks not long after, as did Christophe Riblon (Ag2r–La Mondiale) and Domenico Pozzovivo (Colnago–CSF Bardiani), but Liquigas–Cannondale shut down all the moves via their points classification leader Peter Sagan, who had remained with the lead group. Sagan's closing of the group set up a final attack from Team Katusha's Joaquim Rodríguez with 1 km (0.6 mi) remaining, and held on to win his third career Tirreno–Adriatico stage. Vincenzo Nibali (Liquigas–Cannondale) led Di Luca over the line for second, assuming the points classification lead from Sagan, and moved to within six seconds of RadioShack–Nissan's Chris Horner – who finished fourth on the stage – ahead of the final time trial stage.

Stage 6 Result

	Rider	Team	Time
1	Joaquim Rodríguez (ESP)	Team Katusha	4h 38' 27"
2	Vincenzo Nibali (ITA)	Liquigas–Cannondale	s.t.
3	Danilo Di Luca (ITA)	Acqua & Sapone	s.t.
4	Chris Horner (USA)	RadioShack–Nissan	s.t.
5	Rinaldo Nocentini (ITA)	Ag2r–La Mondiale	s.t.
6	Wout Poels (NED)	Vacansoleil–DCM	s.t.
7	Roman Kreuziger (CZE)	Astana	s.t.
8	Oscar Gatto (ITA)	Farnese Vini–Selle Italia	s.t.
9	Michele Scarponi (ITA)	Lampre–ISD	s.t.
10	Johnny Hoogerland (NED)	Vacansoleil–DCM	s.t.

General Classification after Stage 6

	Rider	Team	Time
1	Chris Horner (USA)	RadioShack–Nissan	29h 27' 06"
2	Roman Kreuziger (CZE)	Astana	+ 5"
3	Vincenzo Nibali (ITA)	Liquigas–Cannondale	+ 6"
4	Rinaldo Nocentini (ITA)	Ag2r–La Mondiale	+ 45"
5	Michele Scarponi (ITA)	Lampre–ISD	+ 47"
6	Johnny Hoogerland (NED)	Vacansoleil–DCM	+ 48"
7	Joaquim Rodríguez (ESP)	Team Katusha	+ 50"
8	Christophe Riblon (FRA)	Ag2r–La Mondiale	+ 1' 15"
9	Danilo Di Luca (ITA)	Acqua & Sapone	+ 1' 21"
10	Domenico Pozzovivo (ITA)	Colnago–CSF Bardiani	+ 1' 22"

=== Stage 7 ===
13 March 2012 — San Benedetto del Tronto, 9.3 km (5.8 mi), individual time trial (ITT)

The Tirreno–Adriatico ended as its parent race, the Giro d'Italia, had for the last four years, with an individual time trial. San Benedetto del Tronto in the Marche region played host to a perfectly flat out-and-back ride right along the Adriatic coast; it was held on the same course as the 2011 edition, where Fabian Cancellara claimed victory for the Leopard Trek team, in a time of 10' 33". Cancellara was the pre-stage favourite, but much of the focus was upon the impending three-rider battle for the overall honours between RadioShack–Nissan's Chris Horner, Astana's Roman Kreuziger and Liquigas–Cannondale's Vincenzo Nibali; the three riders were split by just six seconds prior to the stage. As was customary of time trial stages, cyclists set off in reverse order from where they were ranked in the general classification at the end of the previous stage. Thus, Alex Rasmussen of Garmin–Barracuda, who, in 148th place, trailed overall leader Horner by one hour, sixteen minutes and thirteen seconds, was the first rider to set off on the final stage.

Rasmussen set a time of 11' 05" for the course, but was immediately beaten by GreenEDGE's Svein Tuft – the Canadian national champion – who went inside the 11-minute barrier, with a time of 10' 52". Tuft's time was briefly troubled by Manuele Boaro, a former Italian junior national champion, with the Team Saxo Bank rider coming within a second of beating Tuft's time. Daniele Bennati assumed the lead from Tuft later on, for RadioShack–Nissan; his time of 10' 48" put him four seconds ahead of Tuft, but Bennati's time was only beaten by one other rider – team-mate Cancellara. His time of 10' 36", three seconds outside of his 2011 time, was ultimately good enough to give him his second win of the season, and his fourth career Tirreno–Adriatico stage victory.

Two hours later, the focus shifted to the overall battle; Nibali was the first to leave with Kreuziger and Horner later setting off in two-minute intervals from one another. Nibali set a time of 5' 21" to the intermediate point, and took the virtual lead of the race on the road as Horner and Kreuziger could only muster 5' 32" and 5' 34" respectively. Nibali managed to hold a good pace right to the end of the stage, recording a time of 10' 56"; good enough for ninth place on the stage. Kreuziger struggled in the closing stages, and lost a total of 27 seconds to Nibali, while Horner also lost time to Nibali in the second half of the course; finishing in a time of 11' 16", and thus Nibali became the third Italian in four years to win the race. Nibali added the overall victory to his success in the points classification, while Vacansoleil–DCM's Wout Poels managed to just hold off GreenEDGE rider Cameron Meyer in the young rider classification by eight seconds.

Stage 7 Result

	Rider	Team	Time
1	Fabian Cancellara (SUI)	RadioShack–Nissan	10' 36"
2	Daniele Bennati (ITA)	RadioShack–Nissan	+ 12"
3	Cameron Meyer (AUS)	GreenEDGE	+ 16"
4	Svein Tuft (CAN)	GreenEDGE	+ 16"
5	Manuele Boaro (ITA)	Team Saxo Bank	+ 16"
6	Hayden Roulston (NZL)	RadioShack–Nissan	+ 17"
7	Ian Stannard (GBR)	Team Sky	+ 18"
8	Peter Velits (SVK)	Omega Pharma–Quick-Step	+ 20"
9	Vincenzo Nibali (ITA)	Liquigas–Cannondale	+ 20"
10	Marco Pinotti (ITA)	BMC Racing Team	+ 21"

Final General Classification

	Rider	Team	Time
1	Vincenzo Nibali (ITA)	Liquigas–Cannondale	29h 38' 08"
2	Chris Horner (USA)	RadioShack–Nissan	+ 14"
3	Roman Kreuziger (CZE)	Astana	+ 26"
4	Rinaldo Nocentini (ITA)	Ag2r–La Mondiale	+ 53"
5	Johnny Hoogerland (NED)	Vacansoleil–DCM	+ 1' 00"
6	Joaquim Rodríguez (ESP)	Team Katusha	+ 1' 16"
7	Michele Scarponi (ITA)	Lampre–ISD	+ 1' 16"
8	Wout Poels (NED)	Vacansoleil–DCM	+ 1' 25"
9	Christophe Riblon (FRA)	Ag2r–La Mondiale	+ 1' 31"
10	Cameron Meyer (AUS)	GreenEDGE	+ 1' 33"

== Classification leadership table ==
In the Tirreno–Adriatico, four different jerseys were awarded. For the general classification, calculated by adding each cyclist's finishing times on each stage, and allowing time bonuses in intermediate sprints and at the finish in mass-start stages, the leader received a blue jersey. This classification was considered the most important of the 2012 Tirreno–Adriatico, and the winner was considered the winner of the race itself.

Additionally, there was a points classification, which awarded a red jersey. In the points classification, cyclists got points for finishing in the top ten in a stage. The stage win awarded 12 points, second place awarded 10 points, third 8, and one point fewer per place down the line, to a single point for tenth. In addition, the first four riders across the intermediate sprint lines earned points, 5, 3, 2, and 1 in succession.

There was also a mountains classification, which awarded a green jersey. In the mountains classification, points were won by reaching the top of a mountain before other cyclists. There were sixteen recognised climbs in the race, and unlike most other races, the climbs were not separated into categories – each awarded the same points to the first four riders over its summit, on a scale of 5, 3, 2, and 1 in succession.

The fourth jersey represented the young rider classification, marked by a white jersey. This was decided the same way as the general classification, but only riders born after 1 January 1987 were eligible to be ranked in the classification.

There was also a classification for teams, in which the times of the best three cyclists per team on each stage were added together; the leading team at the end of the race was the team with the lowest total time.

Stage	Winner	General Classification	Points Classification	Mountains Classification	Young Riders Classification	Team Classification
1	GreenEDGE	Matthew Goss	no award	no award	Cameron Meyer	GreenEDGE
2	Mark Cavendish	Matthew Goss	Mark Cavendish	Stefano Pirazzi	Cameron Meyer	GreenEDGE
3	Edvald Boasson Hagen	Matthew Goss	Mark Cavendish	Stefano Pirazzi	Cameron Meyer	GreenEDGE
4	Peter Sagan	Chris Horner	Peter Sagan	Stefano Pirazzi	Cameron Meyer	Astana
5	Vincenzo Nibali	Chris Horner	Peter Sagan	Stefano Pirazzi	Cameron Meyer	Team Katusha
6	Joaquim Rodríguez	Chris Horner	Vincenzo Nibali	Stefano Pirazzi	Wout Poels	Team Katusha
7	Fabian Cancellara	Vincenzo Nibali	Vincenzo Nibali	Stefano Pirazzi	Wout Poels	Ag2r–La Mondiale
Final		Vincenzo Nibali	Vincenzo Nibali	Stefano Pirazzi	Wout Poels	Ag2r–La Mondiale
