= Pietracamela =

- Comune
- Comune di Pietracamela
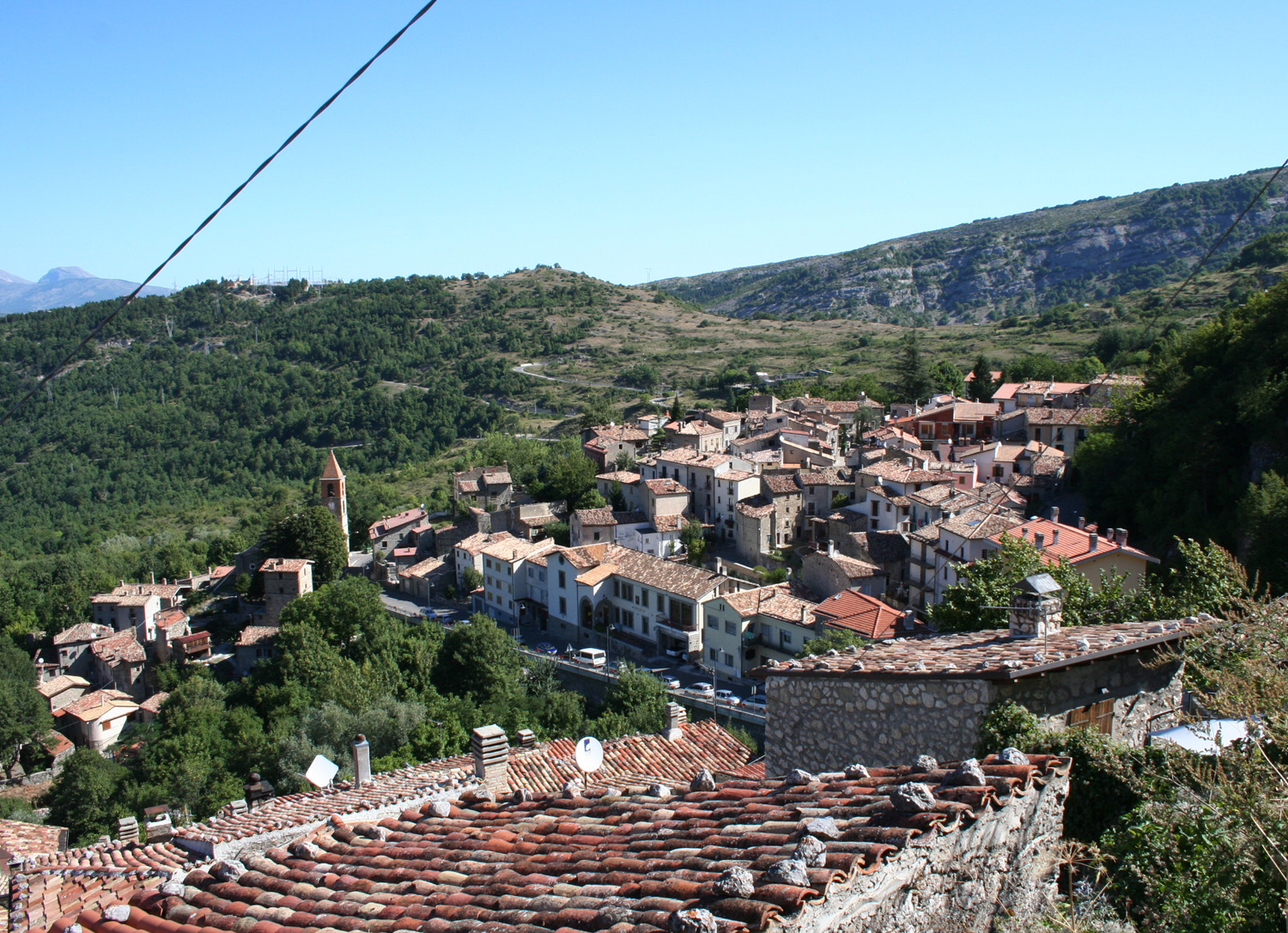

- Location within Italy Location within Abruzzo
- Coordinates: 42°32′N 13°33′E
- Country: Italy
- Region: Abruzzo
- Province: Teramo (TE)
- Frazioni: Intermesoli, Prati di Tivo

Area
  - Total: 44 km^{2} (17 sq mi)
- Elevation: 1,005 m (3,297 ft)

Population (Dec. 2004)
  - Total: 312
  - Density: 7.1/km^{2} (18/sq mi)
- Demonym: Pretaroli
- Time zone: UTC+1 (CET)
  - Summer (DST): UTC+2 (CEST)
- Postal code: 64047
- Dialing code: 0861

Pietracamela (locally La Pròtë) is a town and comune in Teramo province in the Abruzzo region of eastern Italy. It is located at the feet of the Gran Sasso massif, in the natural park known as the "Gran Sasso e Monti della Laga National Park". It is one of I Borghi più belli d'Italia ("The most beautiful villages of Italy").

== Climate ==
Climate data for Pietracamela, elevation 1,030 m (3,380 ft), (1951–2000)
Month	Jan	Feb	Mar	Apr	May	Jun	Jul	Aug	Sep	Oct	Nov	Dec	Year
Record high °C (°F)	19.0 (66.2)	20.7 (69.3)	25.0 (77.0)	24.5 (76.1)	31.5 (88.7)	35.0 (95.0)	35.0 (95.0)	36.8 (98.2)	34.0 (93.2)	27.8 (82.0)	25.0 (77.0)	22.0 (71.6)	36.8 (98.2)
Mean daily maximum °C (°F)	6.5 (43.7)	7.2 (45.0)	9.4 (48.9)	12.4 (54.3)	17.0 (62.6)	21.2 (70.2)	24.5 (76.1)	24.6 (76.3)	20.2 (68.4)	14.9 (58.8)	10.4 (50.7)	7.4 (45.3)	14.6 (58.4)
Daily mean °C (°F)	3.0 (37.4)	3.4 (38.1)	5.5 (41.9)	8.4 (47.1)	12.8 (55.0)	16.7 (62.1)	19.7 (67.5)	19.8 (67.6)	16.0 (60.8)	11.3 (52.3)	7.2 (45.0)	4.2 (39.6)	10.7 (51.2)
Mean daily minimum °C (°F)	−0.4 (31.3)	−0.5 (31.1)	1.5 (34.7)	4.4 (39.9)	8.7 (47.7)	12.3 (54.1)	14.9 (58.8)	14.9 (58.8)	11.8 (53.2)	7.7 (45.9)	4.0 (39.2)	1.1 (34.0)	6.7 (44.1)
Record low °C (°F)	−14.0 (6.8)	−12.8 (9.0)	−12.1 (10.2)	−7.0 (19.4)	−0.5 (31.1)	3.0 (37.4)	4.5 (40.1)	4.0 (39.2)	−1.3 (29.7)	−7.0 (19.4)	−7.0 (19.4)	−13.0 (8.6)	−14.0 (6.8)
Average precipitation mm (inches)	85.4 (3.36)	74.8 (2.94)	95.7 (3.77)	110.4 (4.35)	82.5 (3.25)	68.1 (2.68)	44.9 (1.77)	51.8 (2.04)	78.3 (3.08)	117.1 (4.61)	136.3 (5.37)	120.0 (4.72)	1,065.3 (41.94)
Average precipitation days	8.5	9.1	9.7	10.6	10.0	8.0	6.2	5.8	7.2	9.8	10.8	10.6	106.3
Source: Regione Abruzzo

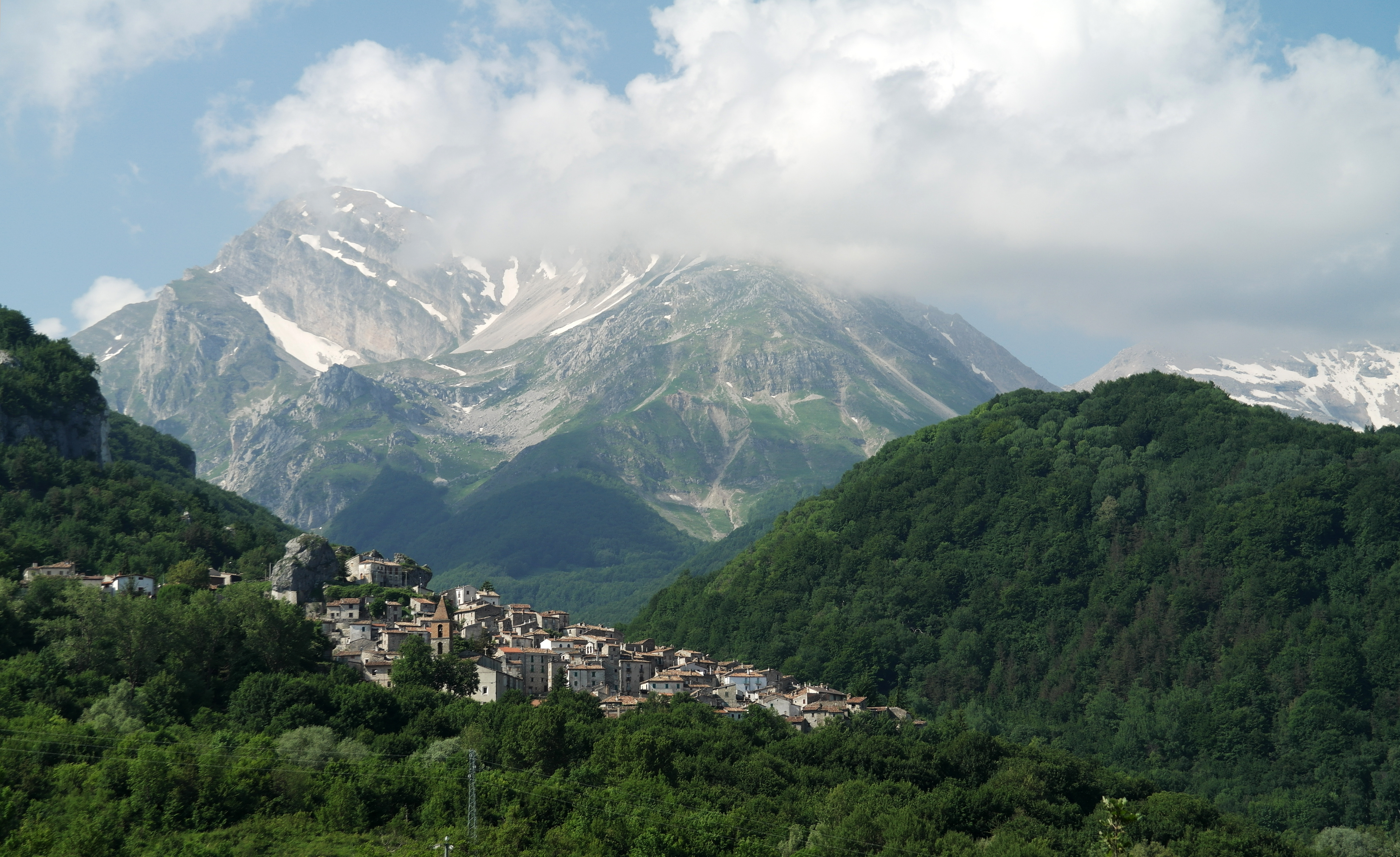
Pietracamela at the feet of Gran Sasso.
