= Prati di Tivo =

Coordinates: 42°29′59″N 13°33′35″E

- Frazione
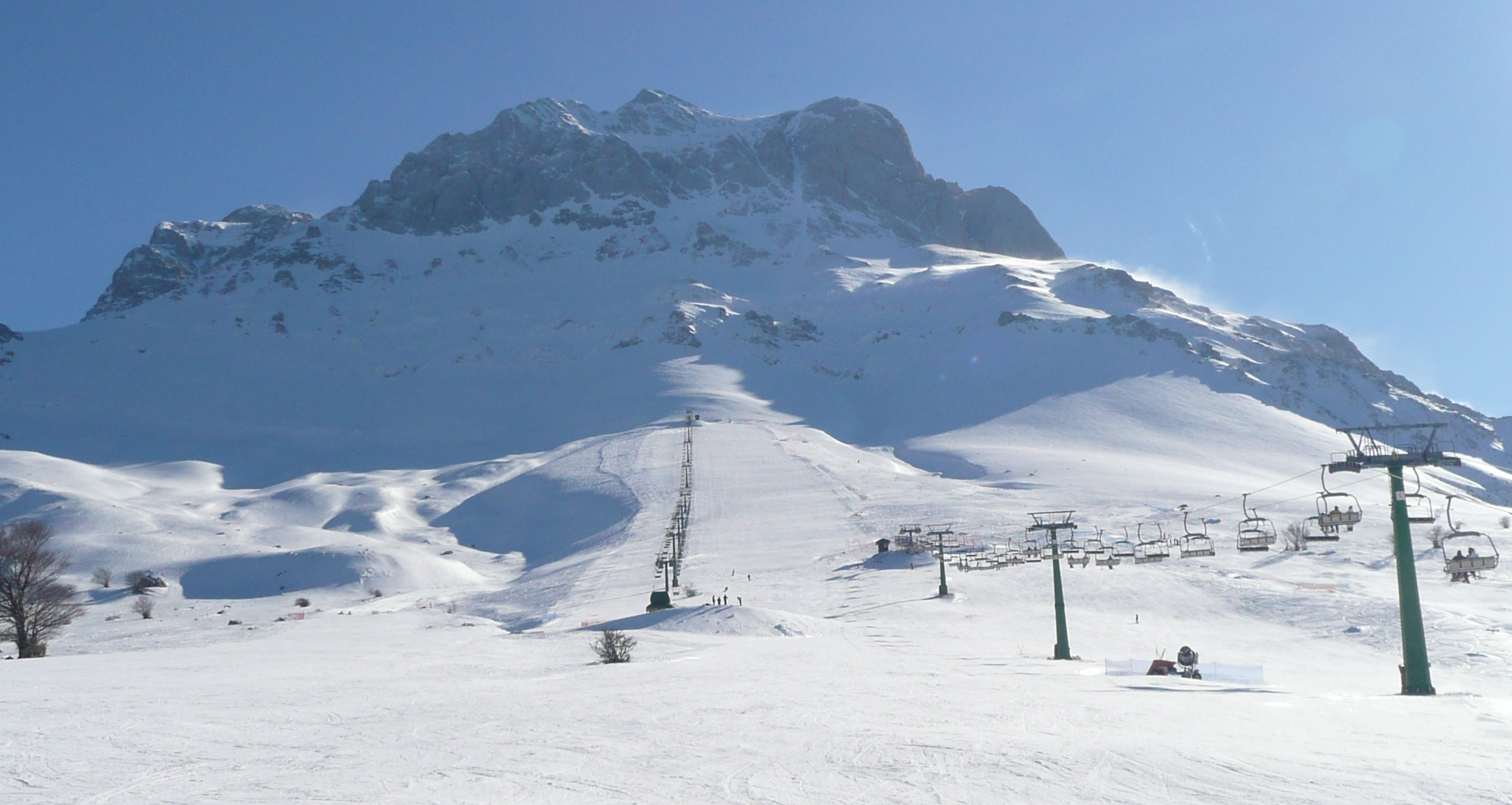
- Interactive map of Prati di Tivo
- Country: Italy
- Region: Abruzzo
- Province: Teramo
- Commune: Pietracamela

Area
  - Land: 92 km^{2} (36 sq mi)

Population (2023)
  - Total: 295
- Time zone: UTC+1 (CET)
  - Summer (DST): UTC+2 (CEST)

Prati di Tivo is ski resort and a frazione of the comune of Pietracamela in the Province of Teramo in the Abruzzo region of Italy. It is a well known place for many activities, such as alpine climbing, snowboarding, hiking, skiing and cycling.

== Geography ==
Prati di Tivo is located on the northeastern slopes of the Gran Sasso d'Italia massif, at the base of the northern slope of the Corno Piccolo. Administratively, it is located in the Province of Teramo, in the commune of Pietracamela, located 40 km from Teramo and falling within the Gran Sasso and Monti della Laga National Park.

Prati di Tivo during the summer

== Cycling ==
Prati di Tivo has hosted multiple stage finishes for Tirreno- Adriatico. It has also hosted a Giro d'Italia stage finish twice.

Year	Stage	Course	Distance (km)	Winner of the stage
1975 (19 may)	3	Ancona > Prati di Tivo	175 km (109 mi)	(Italy) Giovanni Battaglin
2024 (11 may)	8	Spoleto > Prati di Tivo	152 km (94 mi)	(Slovenia) Tadej Pogačar

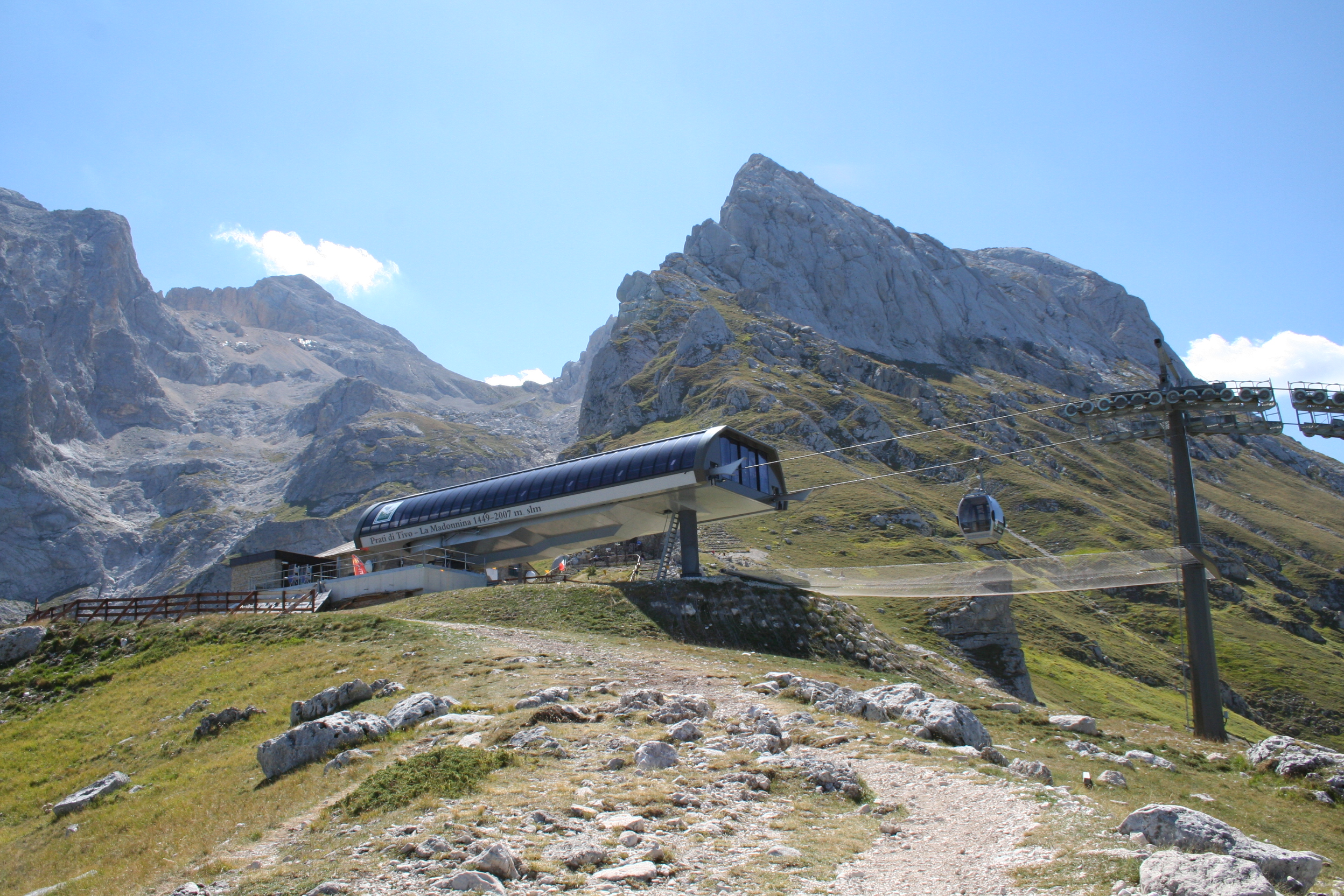
The “La Madonnina”, 2020m above sea level

== Cinematography ==
The 1981 movie Ski Mistress had some scenes shot in Prati di Tivo.

== Gallery ==
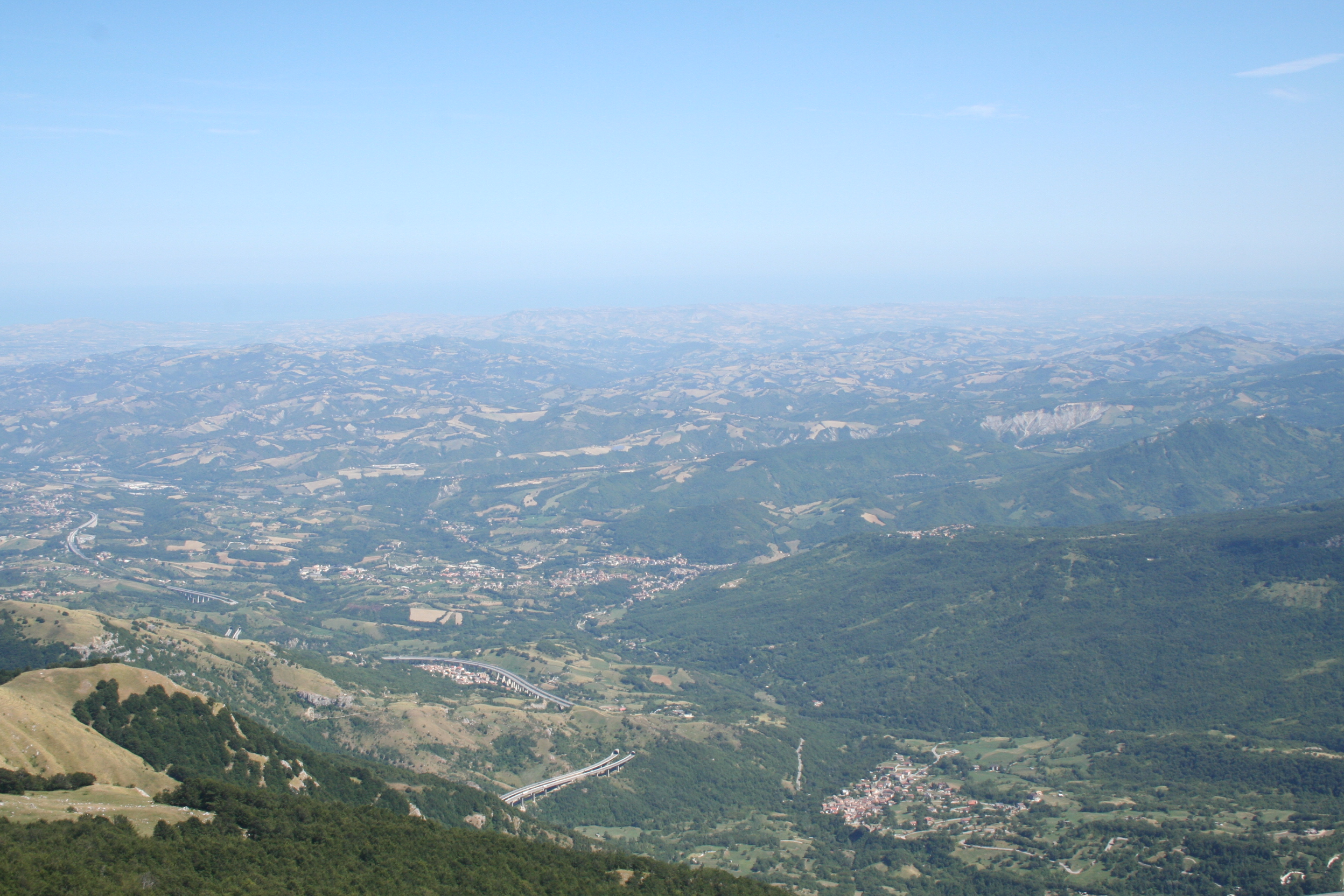
View from Prati di Tivo

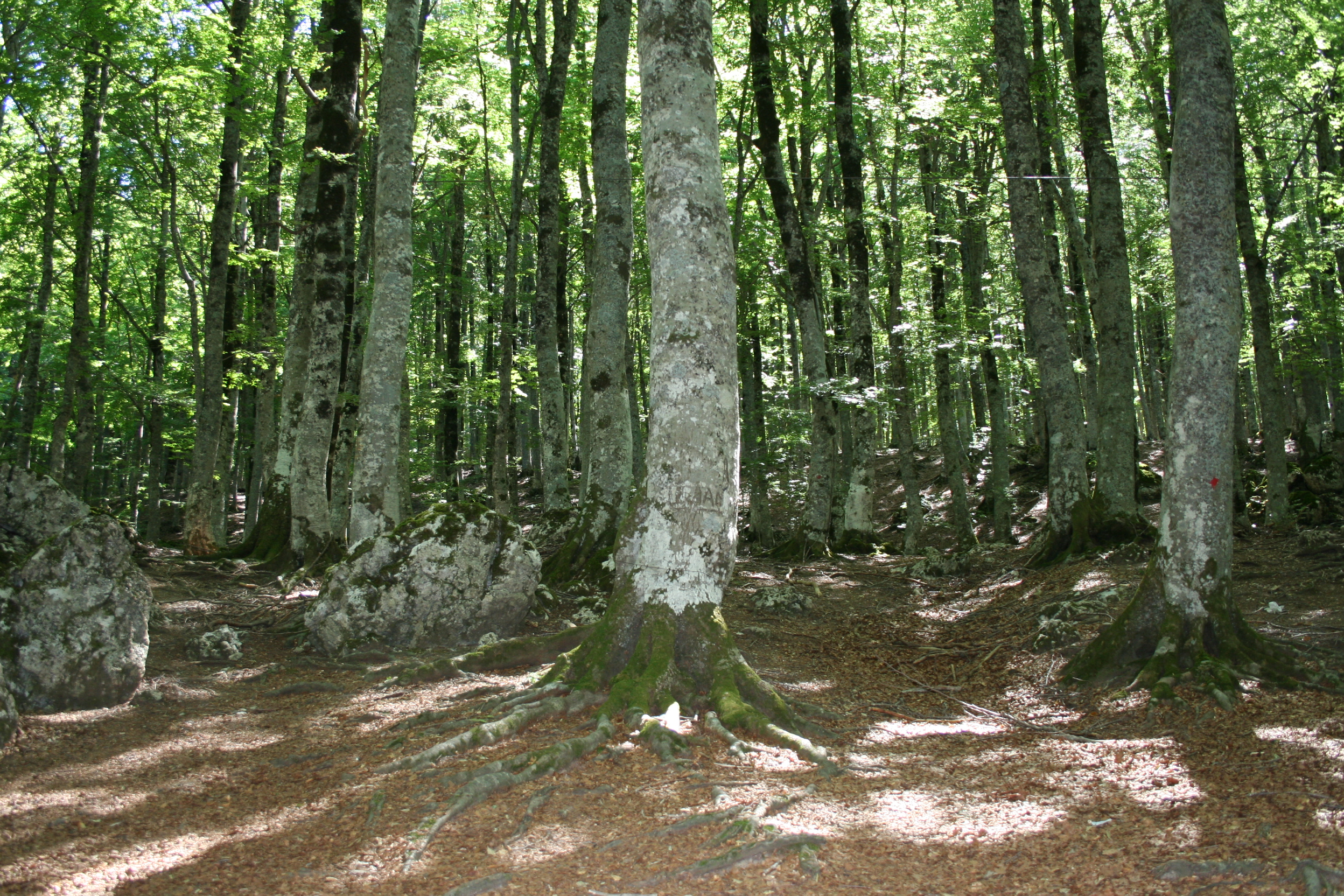
Trees in a forest next to Prati di Tivo

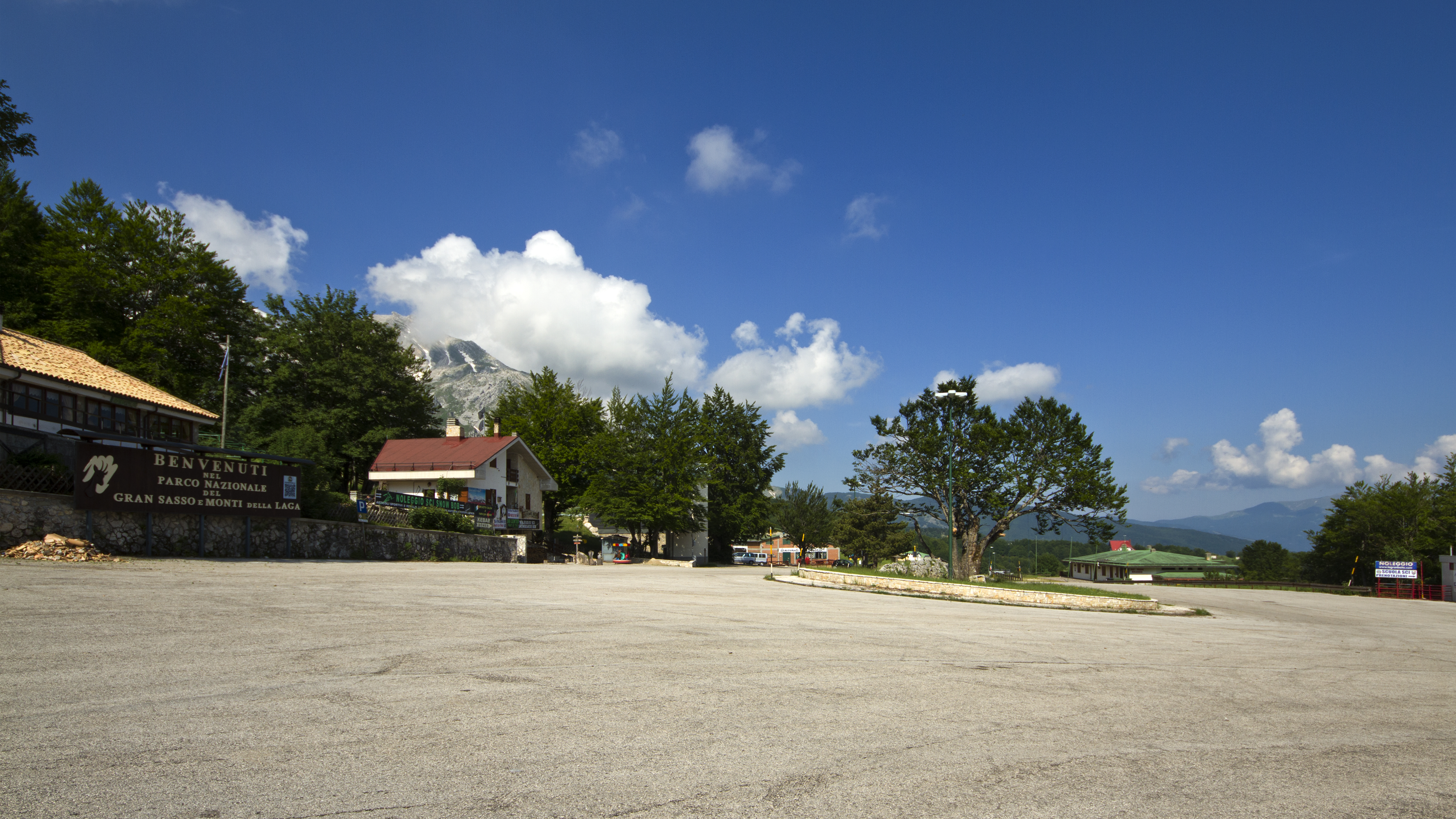
Center of Prati di Tivo
