= 2011 Volta a Portugal =

2010–2011 UCI Europe Tour

Race details
- Dates: August 4–15
- Stages: 10 + Prologue
- Distance: 1,626.8 km (1,011 mi)
- Winning time: 42h 34' 44"

Results
Jersey awarded to the overall winner	Winner	Ricardo Mestre (Portugal)	(Tavira–Prio)
	Second	André Cardoso (Portugal)	(Tavira–Prio)
	Third	Rui Sousa (Portugal)	(Barbot–Efapel)
Jersey awarded to the points classification winner	Points	Sérgio Ribeiro (Portugal)	(Barbot–Efapel)
Jersey awarded to the mountains classification winner	Mountains	Fabricio Ferrari (Uruguay)	(Caja Rural)
Jersey awarded to the youth classification winner	Youth	Garikoitz Bravo (Spain)	(Caja Rural)
	Team	(Portugal) Tavira–Prio	

The 2011 Volta a Portugal is a men's road bicycle race held from 4 to 15 August 2011. It is the 73rd edition of the men's stage race to be held, which was established in 1927. A part of the 2010–2011 UCI Europe Tour, it is rated as a 2.1 event.

== Schedule ==
Stage	Route	Distance	Date	Winner
Prologue	Fafe > Fafe	2.2 km	August 4	Hugo Sabido (PRT)
1	Trofa > Oliveira do Bairro	187.7 km	August 5	Sérgio Ribeiro (PRT)
2	Oliveira de Azeméis > Alto da Nossa Sra. da Assunção	184.4 km	August 6	Sérgio Ribeiro (PRT)
3	Viana do Castelo > Alto da Sra. da Graça	151 km	August 7	Hernâni Brôco (PRT)
4	Lamego > Gouveia	182.3 km	August 8	José Vicente Toribio (ESP)
5	Oliveira do Hospital > Viseu	150.3 km	August 9	Andrea Guardini (ITA)
6	Aveiro > Castelo Branco	215.9 km	August 11	Francesco Gavazzi (ITA)
7	Sabugal > Guarda	35.3 km	August 12	Ricardo Mestre (POR)
8	Seia > Torre	182.8 km	August 13	André Cardoso (POR)
9	Covilhã > Sertã	182.3 km	August 14	Jacob Rathe (USA)
10	Sintra > Lisbon	152.6 km	August 15	Francesco Gavazzi (ITA)

== Teams ==
14 teams are invited to the 2011 Volta a Portugal, but the Italian team Acqua & Sapone remove its inscription in the Volta a Portugal, due to lack of cyclists to participate. 1 team is from the UCI ProTeams, 3 are UCI Professional Continental Teams and 9 are UCI Continental Teams.

UCI ProTeams
- (Italy) Lampre–ISD
UCI Professional Continental Teams
- (Spain) Andalucía–Caja Granada
- (Spain) Caja Rural
- (Italy) Farnese Vini–Neri Sottoli
UCI Continental Teams
- (Portugal) Barbot–Efapel
- (United States) Chipotle–Garmin Development Team
- (Russia) Itera–Katusha
- (Portugal) LA–Antarte
- (Latvia) La Pomme Marseille
- (Portugal) Onda
- (Portugal) Tavira–Prio
- (Portugal) Selecção Nacional–Liberty Seguros
- (Turkey) Konya–Şekerspor–Torku–Vivelo

== Stages ==
=== Prologue ===
4 August 2011 – Fafe to Fafe, 2.2 km (1.4 mi) Individual Time Trial (ITT)

Prologue Result

	Rider	Team	Time
1	Hugo Sabido (PRT)	LA–Antarte	3' 4"
2	Filipe Cardoso (PRT)	Barbot–Efapel	+ 6"
3	Bruno Silva (PRT)	LA–Antarte	s.t.
4	Sérgio Sousa (PRT)	Barbot–Efapel	+ 7"
5	Ricardo Vilela (PRT)	Onda	s.t.
6	Hernâni Brôco (PRT)	LA–Antarte	+ 8"
7	Davide Ricci Bitti (ITA)	Farnese Vini–Neri Sottoli	+ 9"
8	Vergílio Santos (PRT)	LA–Antarte	s.t.
9	Samuel Caldeira (PRT)	Tavira–Prio	s.t.
10	Manuel Ortega (ESP)	Andalucía–Caja Granada	s.t.

General Classification after Prologue

	Rider	Team	Time
1	Hugo Sabido (PRT)	LA–Antarte	3' 4"
2	Filipe Cardoso (PRT)	Barbot–Efapel	+ 6"
3	Bruno Silva (PRT)	LA–Antarte	s.t.
4	Sérgio Sousa (PRT)	Barbot–Efapel	+ 7"
5	Ricardo Vilela (PRT)	Onda	s.t.
6	Hernâni Brôco (PRT)	LA–Antarte	+ 8"
7	Davide Ricci Bitti (ITA)	Farnese Vini–Neri Sottoli	+ 9"
8	Vergílio Santos (PRT)	LA–Antarte	s.t.
9	Samuel Caldeira (PRT)	Tavira–Prio	s.t.
10	Manuel Ortega (ESP)	Andalucía–Caja Granada	s.t.

=== Stage 1 ===
5 August 2011 – Trofa to Oliveira do Bairro, 187.7 km (116.6 mi)

Stage 1 Result

	Rider	Team	Time
1	Sérgio Ribeiro (PRT)	Barbot–Efapel	4h 35' 4"
2	Francesco Gavazzi (ITA)	Lampre–ISD	s.t.
3	António Carvalho (PRT)	Selecção Nacional–Liberty Seguros	s.t.
4	Emanuele Vona (ITA)	Farnese Vini–Neri Sottoli	s.t.
5	Diego Milán (ESP)	Caja Rural	s.t.
6	José Caño (ESP)	Andalucía–Caja Granada	s.t.
7	Robert Bush (USA)	Chipotle–Garmin Development Team	s.t.
8	Justin Jules (FRA)	La Pomme Marseille	s.t.
9	Delio Fernández (ESP)	Onda	s.t.
10	Alejandro Marque (ESP)	Onda	s.t.

General Classification after Stage 1

	Rider	Team	Time
1	Sérgio Ribeiro (PRT)	Barbot–Efapel	4h 38' 10"
2	Davide Ricci Bitti (ITA)	Farnese Vini–Neri Sottoli	s.t.
3	Hugo Sabido (PRT)	LA–Antarte	s.t.
4	Francesco Gavazzi (ITA)	Lampre–ISD	+ 4"
5	Filipe Cardoso (PRT)	Barbot–Efapel	+ 5"
6	Bruno Silva (PRT)	LA–Antarte	+ 6"
7	Sérgio Sousa (PRT)	Barbot–Efapel	+ 7"
8	Ricardo Vilela (PRT)	Onda	s.t.
9	Hernâni Brôco (PRT)	LA–Antarte	+ 8"
10	Vergílio Santos (PRT)	LA–Antarte	+ 9"

=== Stage 2 ===
6 August 2011 – Oliveira de Azeméis to Alto da Nossa Sra. da Assunção, 184.4 km (114.6 mi)

Stage 2 Result

	Rider	Team	Time
1	Sérgio Ribeiro (PRT)	Barbot–Efapel	5h 8' 18"
2	Francesco Gavazzi (ITA)	Lampre–ISD	+ 2"
3	Alessandro Bisolti (ITA)	Farnese Vini–Neri Sottoli	+ 4"
4	Hernâni Brôco (PRT)	LA–Antarte	s.t.
5	André Cardoso (PRT)	Tavira–Prio	s.t.
6	Julien Antomarchi (FRA)	La Pomme Marseille	s.t.
7	Ricardo Mestre (PRT)	Tavira–Prio	+ 9"
8	Rui Sousa (PRT)	Barbot–Efapel	+ 11"
9	Nelson Vitorino (PRT)	Tavira–Prio	+ 14"
10	Vergílio Santos (PRT)	LA–Antarte	s.t.

General Classification after Stage 2

	Rider	Team	Time
1	Sérgio Ribeiro (PRT)	Barbot–Efapel	9h 46' 16"
2	Francesco Gavazzi (ITA)	Lampre–ISD	+ 12"
3	Hernâni Brôco (PRT)	LA–Antarte	+ 24"
4	Alessandro Bisolti (ITA)	Farnese Vini–Neri Sottoli	+ 25"
5	Julien Antomarchi (FRA)	La Pomme Marseille	+ 27"
6	André Cardoso (PRT)	Tavira–Prio	+ 32"
7	Ricardo Vilela (PRT)	Onda	+ 33"
8	Vergílio Santos (PRT)	LA–Antarte	+ 35"
9	Ricardo Mestre (PRT)	Tavira–Prio	+ 36"
10	Rui Sousa (PRT)	Barbot–Efapel	+ 38"

=== Stage 3 ===
7 August 2011 – Viana do Castelo to Alto da Sra. da Graça, 151 km (94 mi)

Stage 3 Result

	Rider	Team	Time
1	Hernâni Brôco (PRT)	LA–Antarte	4h 4' 47"
2	Ricardo Mestre (PRT)	Tavira–Prio	s.t.
3	André Cardoso (PRT)	Tavira–Prio	+ 6"
4	Vergílio Santos (PRT)	LA–Antarte	s.t.
5	Nelson Vitorino (PRT)	Tavira–Prio	s.t.
6	Sergey Firsanov (RUS)	Itera–Katusha	+ 11"
7	David Livramento (PRT)	Tavira–Prio	+ 14"
8	Sérgio Sousa (PRT)	Barbot–Efapel	+ 16"
9	Sérgio Ribeiro (PRT)	Barbot–Efapel	+ 18"
10	Alessandro Bisolti (ITA)	Farnese Vini–Neri Sottoli	+ 26"

General Classification after Stage 3

	Rider	Team	Time
1	Hernâni Brôco (PRT)	LA–Antarte	13h 51' 17"
2	Sérgio Ribeiro (PRT)	Barbot–Efapel	+ 4"
3	Ricardo Mestre (PRT)	Tavira–Prio	+ 16"
4	André Cardoso (PRT)	Tavira–Prio	+ 20"
5	Vergílio Santos (PRT)	LA–Antarte	+ 27"
6	Nelson Vitorino (PRT)	Tavira–Prio	+ 36"
7	Alessandro Bisolti (ITA)	Farnese Vini–Neri Sottoli	+ 37"
8	Sérgio Sousa (PRT)	Barbot–Efapel	+ 51"
9	Rui Sousa (PRT)	Barbot–Efapel	+ 52"
10	Ricardo Vilela (PRT)	Onda	s.t.

=== Stage 4 ===
8 August 2011 – Lamego to Gouveia, 182.3 km (113.3 mi)

Stage 4 Result

	Rider	Team	Time
1	José Vicente Toribio (ESP)	Andalucía–Caja Granada	4h 28' 41"
2	Nelson Vitorino (PRT)	Tavira–Prio	s.t.
3	Francesco Gavazzi (ITA)	Lampre–ISD	s.t.
4	Sérgio Ribeiro (PRT)	Barbot–Efapel	s.t.
5	Danail Petrov (BUL)	Konya–Şekerspor–Torku–Vivelo	s.t.
6	Alessandro Bisolti (ITA)	Farnese Vini–Neri Sottoli	s.t.
7	Sergey Firsanov (RUS)	Itera–Katusha	s.t.
8	Hernâni Brôco (PRT)	LA–Antarte	s.t.
9	André Cardoso (PRT)	Tavira–Prio	s.t.
10	Alex Howes (USA)	Chipotle–Garmin Development Team	s.t.

General Classification after Stage 4

	Rider	Team	Time
1	Hernâni Brôco (PRT)	LA–Antarte	18h 19' 58"
2	Sérgio Ribeiro (PRT)	Barbot–Efapel	+ 3"
3	Ricardo Mestre (PRT)	Tavira–Prio	+ 16"
4	André Cardoso (PRT)	Tavira–Prio	+ 17"
5	Vergílio Santos (PRT)	LA–Antarte	+ 25"
6	Nelson Vitorino (PRT)	Tavira–Prio	+ 30"
7	Alessandro Bisolti (ITA)	Farnese Vini–Neri Sottoli	+ 37"
8	Sérgio Sousa (PRT)	Barbot–Efapel	+ 45"
9	Rui Sousa (PRT)	Barbot–Efapel	+ 52"
10	Ricardo Vilela (PRT)	Onda	s.t.

=== Stage 5 ===
9 August 2011 – Oliveira do Hospital to Viseu, 150.3 km (93.4 mi)

Stage 5 Result

	Rider	Team	Time
1	Andrea Guardini (ITA)	Farnese Vini–Neri Sottoli	3h 44' 2"
2	Sérgio Ribeiro (PRT)	Barbot–Efapel	s.t.
3	Benjamin Giraud (FRA)	La Pomme Marseille	s.t.
4	Robert Bush (USA)	Chipotle–Garmin Development Team	s.t.
5	Raymond Kreder (NED)	Chipotle–Garmin Development Team	s.t.
6	Diego Milán (ESP)	Caja Rural	s.t.
7	Jacob Rathe (USA)	Chipotle–Garmin Development Team	s.t.
8	Samuel Caldeira (PRT)	Tavira–Prio	s.t.
9	Alejandro Marque (ESP)	Onda	s.t.
10	Filipe Cardoso (PRT)	Barbot–Efapel	s.t.

General Classification after Stage 5

	Rider	Team	Time
1	Sérgio Ribeiro (PRT)	Barbot–Efapel	22h 3' 52"
2	Hernâni Brôco (PRT)	LA–Antarte	+ 8"
3	Ricardo Mestre (PRT)	Tavira–Prio	+ 24"
4	André Cardoso (PRT)	Tavira–Prio	+ 25"
5	Vergílio Santos (PRT)	LA–Antarte	+ 33"
6	Nelson Vitorino (PRT)	Tavira–Prio	+ 38"
7	Alessandro Bisolti (ITA)	Farnese Vini–Neri Sottoli	+ 45"
8	Sérgio Sousa (PRT)	Barbot–Efapel	+ 53"
9	Rui Sousa (PRT)	Barbot–Efapel	+ 58"
10	Ricardo Vilela (PRT)	Onda	+ 1'

=== Stage 6 ===
11 August 2011 – Aveiro to Castelo Branco, 215.9 km (134.2 mi)

Stage 6 Result

	Rider	Team	Time
1	Francesco Gavazzi (ITA)	Lampre–ISD	5h 52' 34"
2	Sérgio Ribeiro (PRT)	Barbot–Efapel	s.t.
3	Timofey Kritskiy (RUS)	Itera–Katusha	s.t.
4	Danail Petrov (BUL)	Konya–Şekerspor–Torku–Vivelo	s.t.
5	Samuel Caldeira (PRT)	Tavira–Prio	s.t.
6	Diego Milán (ESP)	Caja Rural	s.t.
7	Bruno Sancho (PRT)	LA–Antarte	s.t.
8	Delio Fernández (ESP)	Onda	s.t.
9	Benjamin Giraud (FRA)	La Pomme Marseille	s.t.
10	Márcio Barbosa (PRT)	LA–Antarte	s.t.

General Classification after Stage 6

	Rider	Team	Time
1	Sérgio Ribeiro (PRT)	Barbot–Efapel	27h 56' 20"
2	Hernâni Brôco (PRT)	LA–Antarte	+ 14"
3	André Cardoso (PRT)	Tavira–Prio	+ 28"
4	Ricardo Mestre (PRT)	Tavira–Prio	+ 30"
5	Vergílio Santos (PRT)	LA–Antarte	+ 39"
6	Nelson Vitorino (PRT)	Tavira–Prio	+ 44"
7	Alessandro Bisolti (ITA)	Farnese Vini–Neri Sottoli	+ 51"
8	Sérgio Sousa (PRT)	Barbot–Efapel	+ 59"
9	Rui Sousa (PRT)	Barbot–Efapel	+ 1'04"
10	Ricardo Vilela (PRT)	Onda	+ 1'06"

=== Stage 7 ===
12 August 2011 – Sabugal to Guarda, 35.3 km (21.9 mi) (ITT)

Stage 7 Result

	Rider	Team	Time
1	Ricardo Mestre (POR)	Tavira–Prio	46' 52"
2	Hernâni Brôco (PRT)	LA–Antarte	+ 1'
3	Ricardo Vilela (PRT)	Onda	+ 1'42"
4	André Cardoso (PRT)	Tavira–Prio	s.t.
5	Rui Sousa (PRT)	Barbot–Efapel	+ 1'55"
6	Nelson Vitorino (PRT)	Tavira–Prio	+ 2'21"
7	Sérgio Ribeiro (PRT)	Barbot–Efapel	+ 2'28"
8	João Cabreira (PRT)	Onda	+ 2'39"
9	Timofey Kritskiy (RUS)	Itera–Katusha	+ 2'50"
10	Vergílio Santos (PRT)	LA–Antarte	+ 3'

General Classification after Stage 7

	Rider	Team	Time
1	Ricardo Mestre (PRT)	Tavira–Prio	28h 43' 42"
2	Hernâni Brôco (PRT)	LA–Antarte	+ 44"
3	André Cardoso (PRT)	Tavira–Prio	+ 1'40"
4	Sérgio Ribeiro (PRT)	Barbot–Efapel	+ 1'58"
5	Ricardo Vilela (PRT)	Onda	+ 2'18"
6	Rui Sousa (PRT)	Barbot–Efapel	+ 2'29"
7	Nelson Vitorino (PRT)	Tavira–Prio	+ 2'35"
8	Vergílio Santos (PRT)	LA–Antarte	+ 3'09"
9	Sérgio Sousa (PRT)	Barbot–Efapel	+ 3'37"
10	Alessandro Bisolti (ITA)	Farnese Vini–Neri Sottoli	+ 3'58"

=== Stage 8 ===
13 August 2011 – Seia to Torre, 182.8 km (113.6 mi)

Stage 8 Result

	Rider	Team	Time
1	André Cardoso (POR)	Tavira–Prio	5h 28' 58"
2	Rui Sousa (PRT)	Barbot–Efapel	s.t.
3	Ricardo Mestre (PRT)	Tavira–Prio	+ 3"
4	Nelson Vitorino (PRT)	Tavira–Prio	+ 14"
5	Célio Sousa (PRT)	Onda	+ 1'47"
6	Hernâni Brôco (PRT)	LA–Antarte	+ 2'06"
7	Delio Fernández (ESP)	Onda	+ 2'17"
8	Francesco Gavazzi (ITA)	Lampre–ISD	+ 2'40"
9	Sérgio Ribeiro (PRT)	Barbot–Efapel	+ 3'25"
10	João Cabreira (PRT)	Onda	+ 3'28"

General Classification after Stage 8

	Rider	Team	Time
1	Ricardo Mestre (PRT)	Tavira–Prio	34h 12' 39"
2	André Cardoso (PRT)	Tavira–Prio	+ 1'31"
3	Rui Sousa (PRT)	Barbot–Efapel	+ 2'24"
4	Nelson Vitorino (PRT)	Tavira–Prio	+ 2'50"
5	Hernâni Brôco (PRT)	LA–Antarte	+ 2'51"
6	Sérgio Ribeiro (PRT)	Barbot–Efapel	+ 5'24"
7	Vergílio Santos (PRT)	LA–Antarte	+ 6'44"
8	Sérgio Sousa (PRT)	Barbot–Efapel	+ 7'06"
9	João Cabreira (PRT)	Onda	+ 7'54"
10	Daniel Silva (PRT)	Onda	+ 8'11"

=== Stage 9 ===
14 August 2011 – Covilhã to Sertã, 182.3 km (113.3 mi)

Stage 9 Result

	Rider	Team	Time
1	Jacob Rathe (USA)	Chipotle–Garmin Development Team	4h 24' 16"
2	Diego Milán (ESP)	Caja Rural	s.t.
3	Davide Ricci Bitti (ITA)	Farnese Vini–Neri Sottoli	s.t.
4	Raúl Alarcón (ESP)	Barbot–Efapel	s.t.
5	Matteo Rabottini (ITA)	Farnese Vini–Neri Sottoli	s.t.
6	Aitor Pérez Arrieta (ESP)	Lampre–ISD	s.t.
7	Diego Caccia (ITA)	Farnese Vini–Neri Sottoli	s.t.
8	Julien Antomarchi (FRA)	La Pomme Marseille	s.t.
9	César Fonte (PRT)	Barbot–Efapel	s.t.
10	Francesco Gavazzi (ITA)	Lampre–ISD	+ 31"

General Classification after Stage 9

	Rider	Team	Time
1	Ricardo Mestre (PRT)	Tavira–Prio	38h 37' 26"
2	André Cardoso (PRT)	Tavira–Prio	+ 1'31"
3	Rui Sousa (PRT)	Barbot–Efapel	+ 2'24"
4	Nelson Vitorino (PRT)	Tavira–Prio	+ 2'50"
5	Hernâni Brôco (PRT)	LA–Antarte	+ 2'51"
6	Sérgio Ribeiro (PRT)	Barbot–Efapel	+ 5'24"
7	Vergílio Santos (PRT)	LA–Antarte	+ 6'44"
8	Sérgio Sousa (PRT)	Barbot–Efapel	+ 7'06"
9	João Cabreira (PRT)	Onda	+ 7'54"
10	Daniel Silva (PRT)	Onda	+ 8'11"

=== Stage 10 ===
15 August 2011 – Sintra to Lisbon, 152.6 km (94.8 mi)

Stage 10 Result

	Rider	Team	Time
1	Francesco Gavazzi (ITA)	Lampre–ISD	3h 57' 12"
2	Sérgio Ribeiro (PRT)	Barbot–Efapel	s.t.
3	Samuel Caldeira (PRT)	Tavira–Prio	s.t.
4	Delio Fernández (ESP)	Onda	+ 3"
5	Filipe Cardoso (PRT)	Barbot–Efapel	+ 6"
6	Rui Sousa (PRT)	Barbot–Efapel	s.t.
7	Manuel Ortega (ESP)	Andalucía–Caja Granada	s.t.
8	Alessandro Bisolti (ITA)	Farnese Vini–Neri Sottoli	s.t.
9	Bruno Saraiva (PRT)	Selecção Nacional–Liberty Seguros	s.t.
10	Pavel Kochetkov (RUS)	Itera–Katusha	s.t.

Final General Classification

	Rider	Team	Time
1	Ricardo Mestre (PRT)	Tavira–Prio	42h 34' 44"
2	André Cardoso (PRT)	Tavira–Prio	+ 1'31"
3	Rui Sousa (PRT)	Barbot–Efapel	+ 2'24"
4	Nelson Vitorino (PRT)	Tavira–Prio	+ 2'48"
5	Hernâni Brôco (PRT)	LA–Antarte	+ 2'58"
6	Sérgio Ribeiro (PRT)	Barbot–Efapel	+ 5'12"
7	Vergílio Santos (PRT)	LA–Antarte	+ 6'44"
8	Sérgio Sousa (PRT)	Barbot–Efapel	+ 7'13"
9	João Cabreira (PRT)	Onda	+ 8'15"
10	Daniel Silva (PRT)	Onda	+ 8'16"

== Classification leadership ==
Stage	Winner	General classification Classificação Geral Individual	Points classification Classificação dos Pontos	Mountains classification Classificação da Montanha	Young rider classification Classificação da Juventude	Team classification Classificação por Equipas
P	Hugo Sabido	Hugo Sabido	Hugo Sabido	Hugo Sabido	Bruno Silva	LA–Antarte
1	Sérgio Ribeiro	Sérgio Ribeiro	Sérgio Ribeiro	Fabricio Ferrari	Bruno Silva	LA–Antarte
2	Sérgio Ribeiro	Sérgio Ribeiro	Sérgio Ribeiro	Fabricio Ferrari	Garikoitz Bravo	Tavira–Prio
3	Hernâni Brôco	Hernâni Brôco	Sérgio Ribeiro	Fabricio Ferrari	Garikoitz Bravo	Tavira–Prio
4	José Vicente Toribio	Hernâni Brôco	Sérgio Ribeiro	Fabricio Ferrari	Garikoitz Bravo	Tavira–Prio
5	Andrea Guardini	Sérgio Ribeiro	Sérgio Ribeiro	Fabricio Ferrari	Garikoitz Bravo	Tavira–Prio
6	Francesco Gavazzi	Sérgio Ribeiro	Sérgio Ribeiro	Fabricio Ferrari	Garikoitz Bravo	Tavira–Prio
7	Ricardo Mestre	Ricardo Mestre	Sérgio Ribeiro	Fabricio Ferrari	Garikoitz Bravo	Tavira–Prio
8	André Cardoso	Ricardo Mestre	Sérgio Ribeiro	Fabricio Ferrari	Garikoitz Bravo	Tavira–Prio
9	Jacob Rathe	Ricardo Mestre	Sérgio Ribeiro	Fabricio Ferrari	Garikoitz Bravo	Tavira–Prio
10	Francesco Gavazzi	Ricardo Mestre	Sérgio Ribeiro	Fabricio Ferrari	Garikoitz Bravo	Tavira–Prio
Final		Ricardo Mestre	Sérgio Ribeiro	Fabricio Ferrari	Garikoitz Bravo	Tavira-Prio
