= André Cardoso =

Portuguese road racing cyclist

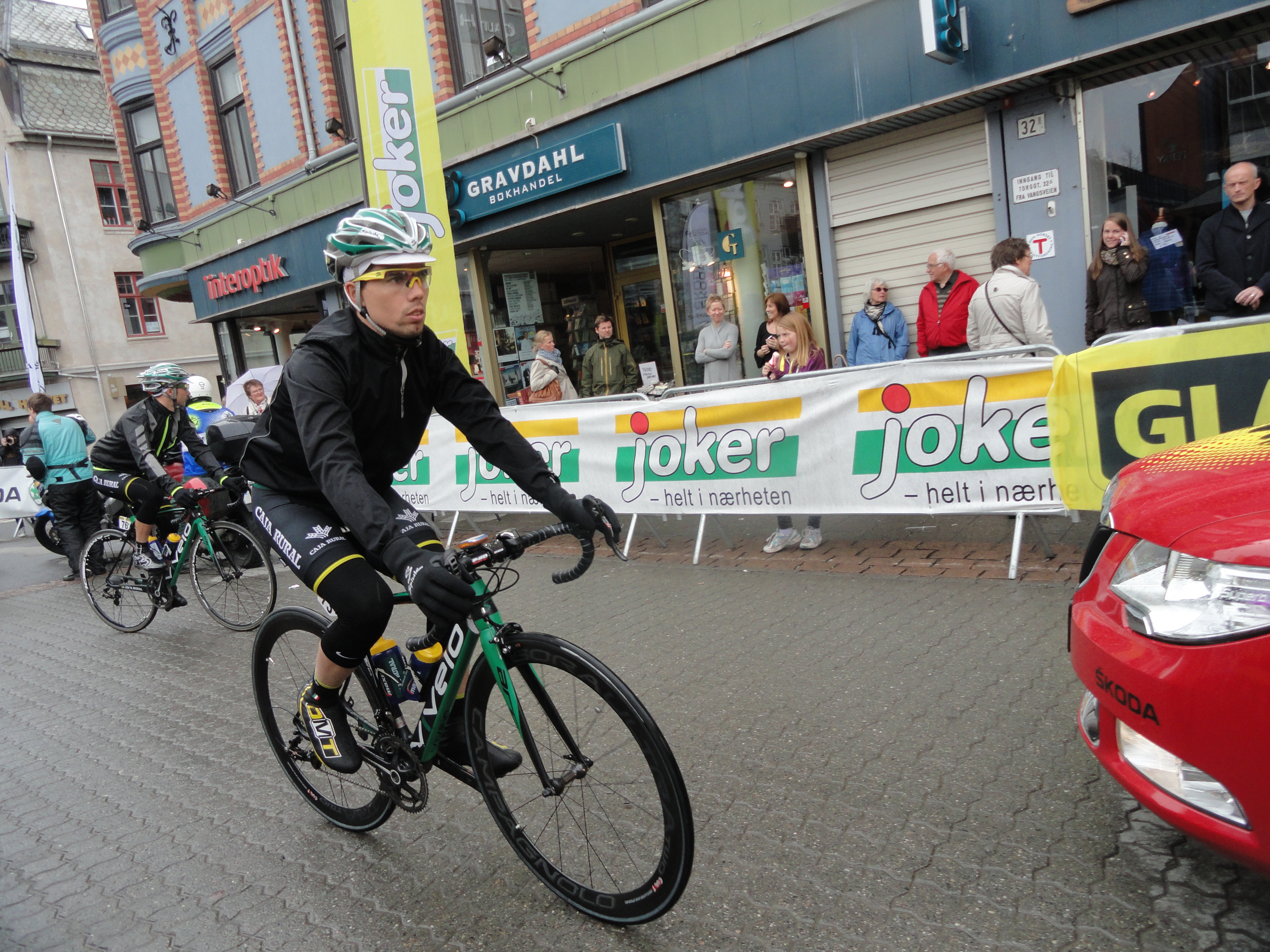
- Cardoso at the 2012 Tour of Norway

Personal information
- Full name: André Fernando Cardoso Santos Martins
- Nickname: Xolas
- Born: 3 September 1984 (age 42) Porto, Portugal
- Height: 1.68 m (5 ft 6 in)
- Weight: 56 kg (123 lb)

Cycling career
- Sport: Cycling
- Discipline: Road
- Role: Rider
- Rider type: Climber

Amateur teams
- 2003: Barbot–Neves–Gondomar
- 2004: Gondomar Clube de Ciclismo
- 2005: Santa Maria da Feira–E.Leclerc

Professional teams
- 2006–2008: Paredes Rota dos Móveis–Beira Tâmega
- 2009–2011: Palmeiras–Resort–Tavira
- 2012–2013: Caja Rural
- 2014–2016: Garmin–Sharp
- 2017: Trek–Segafredo
- 2021: Efapel
- 2022: ABTF–Feirense
- 2023: NSJBI Victoria Sports Pro Cycling Team

André Fernando Cardoso Santos Martins (born 3 September 1984) is a Portuguese professional road racing cyclist, who last rode for UCI Continental team NSJBI Victoria Sports Pro Cycling Team. In 2018, he was suspended for four years, backdated to June 2017, after failing a drugs test for erythropoietin (EPO).

== Career ==
Following a two-year stint with Caja Rural, Cardoso signed with Garmin–Sharp for the 2014 and 2015 seasons. Born in Porto, Portugal, Cardoso resides in Andorra la Vella, Andorra and Gondomar, Portugal.

In September 2016, Trek–Segafredo announced that Cardoso would join them for the 2017 season with a role as a mountain domestique for Alberto Contador and Bauke Mollema. On 27 June 2017, the UCI announced Cardoso tested positive for Erythropoietin in an out-of-competition control nine days earlier and had been provisionally suspended. He was given a four-year ban in November 2018, backdated to June 2017.

Following the conclusion of his ban, Cardoso joined the Efapel team for the remainder of the 2021 season, riding the Troféu Joaquim Agostinho and Volta a Portugal with the team. For the 2022 season, Cardoso will join the ABTF–Feirense team.

== Major results ==
2006
9th Overall Volta ao Algarve
2007
1st Mountains classification Volta a Portugal
1st Young rider classification GP Internacional Paredes Rota dos Móveis
2008
5th Road race, National Road Championships
2009
3rd Overall GP CTT Correios de Portugal
7th Overall Volta a Portugal
9th Overall Troféu Joaquim Agostinho
9th Gran Premio de Llodio
2010
4th Overall Tour of Bulgaria
4th Subida al Naranco
8th Overall Tour de Gironde
9th Overall Volta a Portugal
2011
2nd Overall Volta a Portugal

1st Stage 10

6th Gran Premio de Llodio
7th Overall Troféu Joaquim Agostinho
10th Overall Tour of Bulgaria
2012
1st Mountains classification Tour of Norway
10th Overall Tour of Turkey
10th Rogaland GP
2013
4th Overall Vuelta a Asturias
5th Overall Vuelta a Burgos
6th Overall Tour of Norway
2014
4th Road race, National Road Championships
4th GP Miguel Induráin
2016
10th Overall Tour de San Luis
2017
7th Clássica Aldeias do Xisto

=== Grand Tour general classification results timeline ===
Grand Tour	2012	2013	2014	2015	2016
Giro d'Italia	—	—	20	21	14
Tour de France	Has not contested during his career				
Vuelta a España	21	16	25	18	—

Legend
DNF	Did not finish
DSQ	Disqualified
