= 2012 Volta ao Algarve =

Race details
- Dates: 15–19 February 2012
- Stages: 5
- Distance: 745.2 km (463.0 mi)
- Winning time: 19h 02' 43"

Results
Jersey awarded to the overall winner	Winner	Richie Porte (AUS)	(Team Sky)
	Second	Tony Martin (GER)	(Omega Pharma–Quick-Step)
	Third	Bradley Wiggins (GBR)	(Team Sky)
Jersey awarded to the points classification winner	Points	Edvald Boasson Hagen (NOR)	(Team Sky)
Jersey awarded to the mountains classification winner	Mountains	Sérgio Sousa (POR)	(Efapel–Glassdrive)
Jersey awarded to the sprints classification winner	Sprints	Raúl Alarcón (ESP)	(Efapel–Glassdrive)
	Team	Team Sky	

The 2012 Volta ao Algarve was the 38th edition of the Volta ao Algarve cycling stage race. It was held from 15 to 19 February 2012, and was rated as a 2.1 event on the UCI Europe Tour.

The race was won by Australia's Richie Porte, of Team Sky, after taking the overall lead with victory on the third stage, and held the lead to the end of the race. Porte's winning margin over runner-up Tony Martin (Omega Pharma–Quick-Step) – the defending race winner – was 37 seconds, and Porte's team-mate Bradley Wiggins completed the podium, seven seconds behind Martin and 44 seconds down on Porte. In the race's other classifications, Team Sky's Edvald Boasson Hagen won the points classification, Efapel–Glassdrive pairing Sérgio Sousa and Raúl Alarcón won the mountains and sprints classifications respectively, and Team Sky finished at the head of the teams classification.

== Teams and cyclists ==
20 teams competed in the 2012 Volta ao Algarve. Among them were 11 UCI ProTour teams, four UCI Professional Continental teams, and five Continental teams.

The teams competing were:

UCI ProTour Teams

- Ag2r–La Mondiale
- BMC Racing Team
- Garmin–Barracuda
- Lotto–Belisol
- Omega Pharma–Quick-Step
- Rabobank
- RadioShack–Nissan
- Team Saxo Bank
- Team Sky
- Vacansoleil–DCM
- Movistar Team

UCI Professional Continental Teams

- Caja Rural
- RusVelo
- Topsport Vlaanderen–Mercator
- UnitedHealthcare

UCI Continental Teams

- An Post–Sean Kelly
- Efapel–Glassdrive
- LA–Antarte
- Carmim–Prio
- Onda

== Stages ==
=== Stage 1 ===
15 February 2012 — Dunas Douradas to Albufeira, 151.0 km (93.8 mi)

Stage 1 Result

	Rider	Team	Time
1	Gianni Meersman (BEL)	Lotto–Belisol	4h 02' 17"
2	Greg Van Avermaet (BEL)	BMC Racing Team	s.t.
3	Matti Breschel (DEN)	Rabobank	s.t.
4	Björn Leukemans (BEL)	Vacansoleil–DCM	s.t.
5	Nicolas Roche (IRL)	Ag2r–La Mondiale	s.t.
6	Anthony Ravard (FRA)	Ag2r–La Mondiale	s.t.
7	Rui Costa (POR)	Movistar Team	s.t.
8	Michael Van Staeyen (BEL)	Topsport Vlaanderen–Mercator	s.t.
9	Edvald Boasson Hagen (NOR)	Team Sky	s.t.
10	Jan Bakelants (BEL)	RadioShack–Nissan	s.t.

General Classification after Stage 1

	Cyclist	Team	Time
1	Gianni Meersman (BEL)	Lotto–Belisol	4h 02' 07"
2	Greg Van Avermaet (BEL)	BMC Racing Team	+ 4"
3	Matti Breschel (DEN)	Rabobank	+ 6"
4	Björn Leukemans (BEL)	Vacansoleil–DCM	+ 10"
5	Nicolas Roche (IRL)	Ag2r–La Mondiale	+ 10"
6	Anthony Ravard (FRA)	Ag2r–La Mondiale	+ 10"
7	Rui Costa (POR)	Movistar Team	+ 10"
8	Michael Van Staeyen (BEL)	Topsport Vlaanderen–Mercator	+ 10"
9	Edvald Boasson Hagen (NOR)	Team Sky	+ 10"
10	Jan Bakelants (BEL)	RadioShack–Nissan	+ 10"

=== Stage 2 ===
16 February 2012 — Faro to Lagoa, 187.5 km (116.5 mi)

Stage 2 Result

	Rider	Team	Time
1	Edvald Boasson Hagen (NOR)	Team Sky	4h 57' 23"
2	Kris Boeckmans (BEL)	Vacansoleil–DCM	s.t.
3	Gerald Ciolek (GER)	Omega Pharma–Quick-Step	s.t.
4	Matti Breschel (DEN)	Rabobank	s.t.
5	Anthony Ravard (FRA)	Ag2r–La Mondiale	s.t.
6	Lloyd Mondory (FRA)	Ag2r–La Mondiale	s.t.
7	Francesco Lasca (ITA)	Caja Rural	s.t.
8	Koldo Fernández (ESP)	Garmin–Barracuda	s.t.
9	Nikolas Maes (BEL)	Omega Pharma–Quick-Step	s.t.
10	Pieter Vanspeybrouck (BEL)	Topsport Vlaanderen–Mercator	s.t.

General Classification after Stage 2

	Cyclist	Team	Time
1	Edvald Boasson Hagen (NOR)	Team Sky	8h 59' 30"
2	Gianni Meersman (BEL)	Lotto–Belisol	+ 0"
3	Kris Boeckmans (BEL)	Vacansoleil–DCM	+ 4"
4	Greg Van Avermaet (BEL)	BMC Racing Team	+ 4"
5	Matti Breschel (DEN)	Rabobank	+ 6"
6	Anthony Ravard (FRA)	Ag2r–La Mondiale	+ 10"
7	Björn Leukemans (BEL)	Vacansoleil–DCM	+ 10"
8	Fabian Wegmann (GER)	Garmin–Barracuda	+ 10"
9	Rui Costa (POR)	Movistar Team	+ 10"
10	Jan Bakelants (BEL)	RadioShack–Nissan	+ 10"

=== Stage 3 ===
17 February 2012 — Castro Marim to Alto do Malhão, 194.6 km (120.9 mi)

Stage 3 Result

	Rider	Team	Time
1	Richie Porte (AUS)	Team Sky	4h 55' 11"
2	Tiago Machado (POR)	RadioShack–Nissan	+ 8"
3	Rui Costa (POR)	Movistar Team	+ 8"
4	Johnny Hoogerland (NED)	Vacansoleil–DCM	+ 24"
5	Wout Poels (NED)	Vacansoleil–DCM	+ 24"
6	Jurgen Van den Broeck (BEL)	Lotto–Belisol	+ 24"
7	Andrew Talansky (USA)	Garmin–Barracuda	+ 31"
8	José Mendes (POR)	LA–Antarte	+ 35"
9	Tony Martin (GER)	Omega Pharma–Quick-Step	+ 40"
10	Bradley Wiggins (GBR)	Team Sky	+ 40"

General Classification after Stage 3

	Cyclist	Team	Time
1	Richie Porte (AUS)	Team Sky	13h 54' 41"
2	Tiago Machado (POR)	RadioShack–Nissan	+ 12"
3	Rui Costa (POR)	Movistar Team	+ 14"
4	Johnny Hoogerland (NED)	Vacansoleil–DCM	+ 34"
5	Wout Poels (NED)	Vacansoleil–DCM	+ 34"
6	Jurgen Van den Broeck (BEL)	Lotto–Belisol	+ 34"
7	José Mendes (POR)	LA–Antarte	+ 45"
8	Andrew Talansky (USA)	Garmin–Barracuda	+ 48"
9	Gianni Meersman (BEL)	Lotto–Belisol	+ 49"
10	Tony Martin (GER)	Omega Pharma–Quick-Step	+ 50"

=== Stage 4 ===
18 February 2012 — Vilamoura to Tavira, 186.3 km (115.8 mi)

Stage 4 Result

	Rider	Team	Time
1	Gerald Ciolek (GER)	Omega Pharma–Quick-Step	4h 35' 01"
2	Matteo Trentin (ITA)	Omega Pharma–Quick-Step	s.t.
3	Heinrich Haussler (AUS)	Garmin–Barracuda	s.t.
4	Edvald Boasson Hagen (NOR)	Team Sky	s.t.
5	Francesco Lasca (ITA)	Caja Rural	s.t.
6	Koldo Fernández (ESP)	Garmin–Barracuda	s.t.
7	Kris Boeckmans (BEL)	Vacansoleil–DCM	s.t.
8	Anthony Ravard (FRA)	Ag2r–La Mondiale	s.t.
9	Gianni Meersman (BEL)	Lotto–Belisol	s.t.
10	Michael Van Staeyen (BEL)	Topsport Vlaanderen–Mercator	s.t.

General Classification after Stage 4

	Cyclist	Team	Time
1	Richie Porte (AUS)	Team Sky	18h 29' 42"
2	Rui Costa (POR)	Movistar Team	+ 12"
3	Tiago Machado (POR)	RadioShack–Nissan	+ 12"
4	Johnny Hoogerland (NED)	Vacansoleil–DCM	+ 34"
5	Jurgen Van den Broeck (BEL)	Lotto–Belisol	+ 34"
6	Wout Poels (NED)	Vacansoleil–DCM	+ 34"
7	José Mendes (POR)	LA–Antarte	+ 45"
8	Andrew Talansky (USA)	Garmin–Barracuda	+ 48"
9	Gianni Meersman (BEL)	Lotto–Belisol	+ 49"
10	Tony Martin (GER)	Omega Pharma–Quick-Step	+ 50"

=== Stage 5 ===
19 February 2012 — Lagoa to Portimão, 25.8 km (16.0 mi), individual time trial (ITT)

Stage 5 Result

	Rider	Team	Time
1	Bradley Wiggins (GBR)	Team Sky	32' 48"
2	Tony Martin (GER)	Omega Pharma–Quick-Step	+ 0"
3	Richie Porte (AUS)	Team Sky	+ 13"
4	Tejay van Garderen (USA)	BMC Racing Team	+ 14"
5	Jesse Sergent (NZL)	RadioShack–Nissan	+ 14"
6	Jurgen Van den Broeck (BEL)	Lotto–Belisol	+ 29"
7	Andrew Talansky (USA)	Garmin–Barracuda	+ 39"
8	Michał Kwiatkowski (POL)	Omega Pharma–Quick-Step	+ 53"
9	Edvald Boasson Hagen (NOR)	Team Sky	+ 56"
10	Luis León Sánchez (ESP)	Rabobank	+ 56"

Final General Classification

	Cyclist	Team	Time
1	Richie Porte (AUS)	Team Sky	19h 02' 43"
2	Tony Martin (GER)	Omega Pharma–Quick-Step	+ 37"
3	Bradley Wiggins (GBR)	Team Sky	+ 44"
4	Jurgen Van den Broeck (BEL)	Lotto–Belisol	+ 50"
5	Rui Costa (POR)	Movistar Team	+ 58"
6	Tiago Machado (POR)	RadioShack–Nissan	+ 1' 02"
7	Tejay van Garderen (USA)	BMC Racing Team	+ 1' 13"
8	Andrew Talansky (USA)	Garmin–Barracuda	+ 1' 14"
9	Johnny Hoogerland (NED)	Vacansoleil–DCM	+ 1' 33"
10	Gianni Meersman (BEL)	Lotto–Belisol	+ 1' 39"

== Classification leadership ==
Stage	Winner	General Classification	Mountains Classification	Sprints Classification	Points Classification	Teams Classification
1	Gianni Meersman	Gianni Meersman	Karsten Kroon	Karsten Kroon	Gianni Meersman	Ag2r–La Mondiale
2	Edvald Boasson Hagen	Edvald Boasson Hagen	Karsten Kroon	Raúl Alarcón	Matti Breschel	Vacansoleil–DCM
3	Richie Porte	Richie Porte	Sérgio Sousa	Raúl Alarcón	Matti Breschel	Movistar Team
4	Gerald Ciolek	Richie Porte	Sérgio Sousa	Raúl Alarcón	Edvald Boasson Hagen	Movistar Team
5	Bradley Wiggins	Richie Porte	Sérgio Sousa	Raúl Alarcón	Edvald Boasson Hagen	Team Sky
Final		Richie Porte	Sérgio Sousa	Raúl Alarcón	Edvald Boasson Hagen	Team Sky
