= GP Liberty Seguros =

Portuguese multi-day road cycling race

GP Liberty seguros
Race details
- Date: March
- Region: Portugal
- Local name(s): GP Liberty Seguros-Troféu Sudoeste Alentejano e Costa Vicentina; Volta a Costa Vicentina; GP Liberty Seguros-Trofeu alprendre
- Discipline: Road race
- Competition: UCI Europe Tour
- Type: Stage race

History
- First edition: 2009
- Editions: 8 (as of 2016)

GP Liberty Seguros (officially GP Liberty Seguros - Troféu Alpendre) is a road bicycle race held annually in Portugal since 2009. It is organized as a 2.2 event on the UCI Europe Tour.

== Winners ==
Year	winner	Second	Third
2009	(Portugal) Daniel Eduardo Silva	(Portugal) Rui Costa	(Portugal) Tiago Machado
2010	(Spain) Santiago Pérez	(Spain) David Blanco	(Portugal) André Cardoso
2011	(Portugal) Sérgio Ribeiro	(Portugal) Filipe Cardoso	(Portugal) Samuel Caldeira
2012	(Portugal) Ricardo Mestre	(Portugal) Sérgio Sousa	(Spain) Alejandro Marque
2013	(Spain) Delio Fernández	(Spain) Lluís Mas Bonet	(Spain) Eduard Prades
2014	(Portugal) Rafael Silva	(Portugal) Sérgio Sousa	(Portugal) Nuno Ribeiro
2015	(Portugal) Ruben Guerreiro	(Poland) Paweł Bernas	(United States) Colin Joyce
2016	(Norway) August Jensen	(Canada) Will Routley	(Spain) Vicente García de Mateos
