= Hugo Sabido =

Portuguese bicycle racer

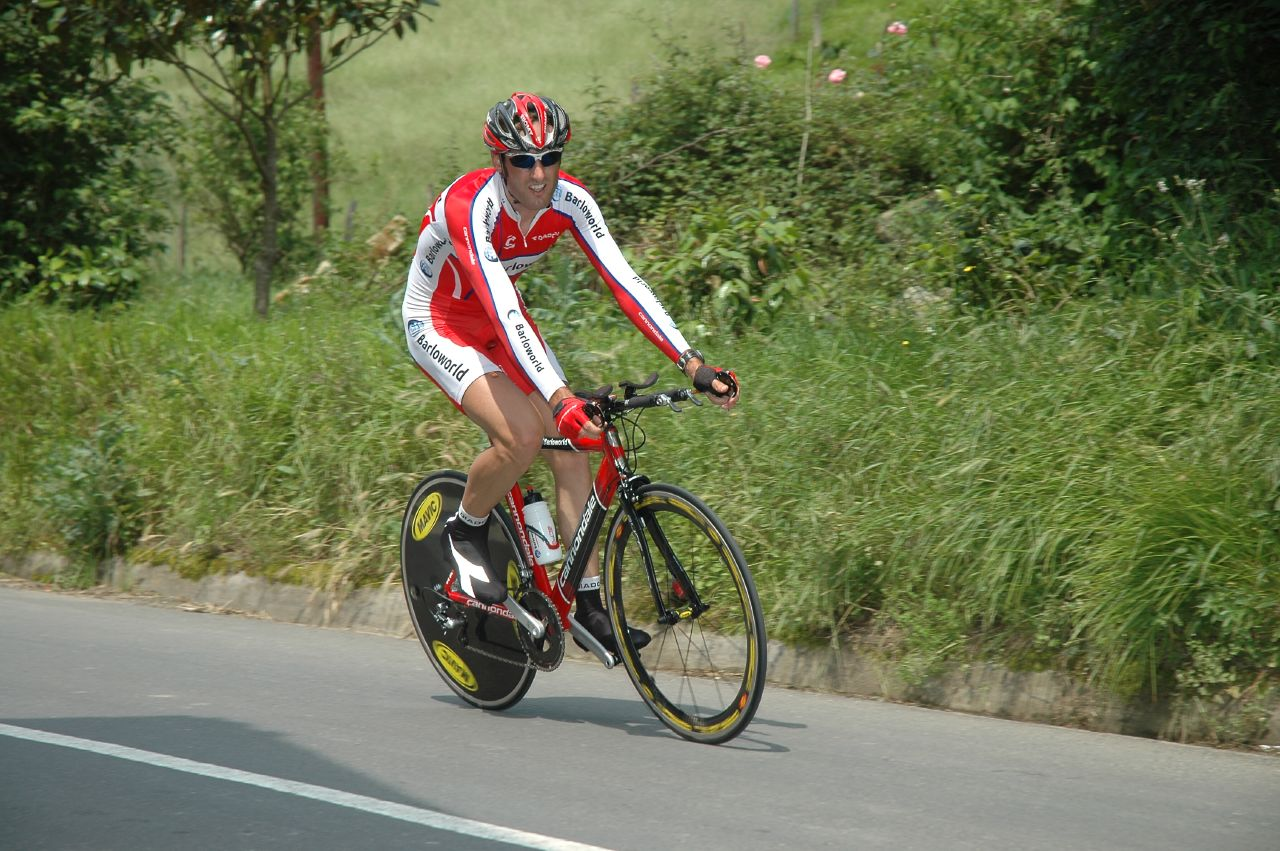

Personal information
- Full name: Hugo Manuel Sabido Madeira
- Born: 14 December 1979 (age 46) Oeiras, Portugal
- Height: 1.85 m (6 ft 1 in)
- Weight: 70 kg (154 lb)

Cycling career
- Sport: Cycling
- Current team: Retired
- Discipline: Road
- Role: Rider

Professional teams
- 2001–2002: Gresco–Tavira
- 2003: Barbot–Torrie
- 2004: Milaneza–Maia
- 2005: Paredes Rota dos Móveis–Beira Tâmega
- 2006–2008: Barloworld
- 2009–2014: LA Alumínios–Rota dos Móveis
- 2015: Louletano–Ray Just Energy
- 2016: Sporting / Tavira

Hugo Manuel Sabido Madeira (born 14 December 1979 in Oeiras) is a Portuguese former professional cyclist.

== Major results ==
2003
3rd Overall Volta ao Alentejo

1st Stage 3

2004
2nd Time trial, National Road Championships
2nd Overall Tour de Pologne

1st Stage 7

10th Overall Volta ao Alentejo

1st Stage 2

2005
1st Overall Volta ao Algarve

1st Mountains classification
1st Stage 5

2006
6th Overall Tour de la Région Wallonne
9th Overall Tour de Picardie
2007
4th Overall Giro del Capo

1st Mountains classification

4th Gran Premio Industria e Commercio Artigianato Carnaghese
7th Overall Volta ao Distrito de Santarém
2008
8th Overall Giro del Capo
2010
7th Overall Volta a Portugal
2011
1st Prologue Volta a Portugal
2nd Time trial, National Road Championships
2012
2nd Overall Volta a Portugal
8th Overall Volta ao Alentejo
2013
3rd Time trial, National Road Championships
2015
1st Sprints classification Vuelta a la Comunidad de Madrid
