= 2012 Volta a Portugal =

2012 UCI Europe Tour

Race details
- Dates: August 15–26
- Stages: 10 + Prologue

Results
Jersey awarded to the overall winner	Winner	David Blanco (ESP)	(Efapel-Glassdrive)
	Second	Hugo Sabido (POR)	(LA-Antarte)
	Third	Rui Sousa (POR)	(Efapel-Glassdrive)
Jersey awarded to the points classification winner	Points	Reinardt Janse van Rensburg (RSA)	(MTN–Qhubeka)
Jersey awarded to the mountains classification winner	Mountains	Rui Sousa (POR)	(Efapel-Glassdrive)
Jersey awarded to the youth classification winner	Youth	David de la Cruz (ESP)	(Caja Rural)

The 2012 Volta a Portugal is a men's road bicycle race held from 15 to 26 August 2012. It is the 74th edition of the men's stage race to be held, which was established in 1927. A part of the 2012 UCI Europe Tour, it is rated as a 2.1 event.

== Schedule ==
Stage	Route	Distance	Date	Winner
Prologue	Castelo Branco > Castelo Branco	2.2 km	August 15	Reinardt Janse van Rensburg (RSA)
1	Termas de Monfortinho > Oliveira do Hospital	200.8 km	August 16	Jay Thomson (RSA)
2	Oliveira do Bairro > Trofa	191.5 km	August 17	Francesco Lasca (ITA)
3	Vila Nova de Cerveira > Fafe	176.1 km	August 18	César Fonte (POR)
4	Viana do Castelo > Mondim de Basto	151.9 km	August 19	Rui Sousa (POR)
5	Armamar > Oliveira de Azeméis	176.9 km	August 20	Sérgio Ribeiro (POR)
6	Aveiro > Viseu	184.1 km	August 21	Jason McCartney (USA)
7	Gouveia > Sabugal	185.3 km	August 23	Kai Reus (NED)
8	Guarda > Torre	154.9 km	August 24	David Blanco (ESP)
9 ITT	Pedrogão > Leiria	32.6 km	August 25	Alejandro Marque (ESP)
10	Sintra > Lisbon	149.5 km	August 26	Reinardt Janse van Rensburg (RSA)

== Participating teams ==
In total, 17 teams are set to compete.

- National teams:
  - Carmim-Prio
  - Efapel-Glassdrive
  - LA-Antarte
  - Onda
  - Portuguese National Team
- International teams:
  - Funvic–Pindamonhangaba
  - Caja Rural
  - Andalucía
  - Orbea
  - Burgos BH–Castilla y Leon
  - Colombia–Coldeportes
  - Saur–Sojasun
  - UnitedHealthcare
  - Itera–Katusha
  - Lokosphinx
  - MTN–Qhubeka
  - Team Bonitas

== Classification leadership ==
Stage	Winner	General classification Classificação Geral Individual	Points classification Classificação dos Pontos	Mountains classification Classificação da Montanha	Young rider classification Classificação da Juventude	Team classification Classificação por Equipas
Prologue	Reinardt Janse van Rensburg	Reinardt Janse van Rensburg	Reinardt Janse van Rensburg	Non-attribué	Reinardt Janse van Rensburg	LA-Antarte
1	Jay Thomson	Jay Thomson	Jay Robert Thomson	Jay Thomson	José Gonçalves	Unitedhealthcare
2	Francesco Lasca	Jay Thomson	Hugo Sabido	Jay Thomson	José Gonçalves	Unitedhealthcare
3	Cesar Fonte	Jay Thomson	Hugo Sabido	Jay Thomson	José Gonçalves	Unitedhealthcare
4	Rui Sousa	Hugo Sabido	Hugo Sabido	Jay Thomson	David de la Cruz	Efapel-Glassdrive
5	Sergio Ribeiro	Hugo Sabido	Reinardt Janse van Rensburg	Rui Sousa	David de la Cruz	Efapel-Glassdrive
6	Jason McCartney	Hugo Sabido	Reinardt Janse van Rensburg	Rui Sousa	David de la Cruz	Efapel-Glassdrive
7	Kai Reus	Hugo Sabido	Reinardt Janse van Rensburg	Rui Sousa	David de la Cruz	Efapel-Glassdrive
8	David Blanco	David Blanco	Sergio Ribeiro	Rui Sousa	David de la Cruz	Efapel-Glassdrive
9	Alejandro Marque	David Blanco	Reinardt Janse van Rensburg	Rui Sousa	David de la Cruz	Efapel-Glassdrive
10	Reinardt Janse van Rensburg	David Blanco	Reinardt Janse van Rensburg	Rui Sousa	David de la Cruz	Efapel-Glassdrive
Final Classification		David Blanco	Reinardt Janse van Rensburg	Rui Sousa	David de la Cruz	Efapel-Glassdrive
