= Hernâni Brôco =

Portuguese cyclist

Personal information
- Full name: Hernani Manuel Conceição Brôco
- Born: 13 June 1981 (age 45) Torres Vedras, Portugal
- Height: 1.81 m (5 ft 11 in)
- Weight: 55 kg (121 lb)

Cycling career
- Sport: Cycling
- Current team: Retired
- Discipline: Road
- Role: Rider

Amateur team
- Bonabal Fonotel

Professional teams
- 2004–2009: LA Alumínios–Pecol
- 2010–2011: LA Alumínios–Rota dos Móveis
- 2012: Caja Rural
- 2013: Efapel–Glassdrive
- 2014: Louletano–Dunas Douradas
- 2015–2016: LA Alumínios–Antarte

Hernani Manuel Conceição Brôco (born 13 June 1981 in Torres Vedras) is a Portuguese former road cyclist. Son of former cyclist Mario Manuel dos Santos Brôco and Maria Eugénia da Conceição Brôco he is a Bonabal native.

== Major results ==
2001
1st Stage 1 GP CTT Correios de Portugal
2002
3rd Time trial, National Under-23 Road Championships
2003
1st Time trial, National Under-23 Road Championships
2004
1st Mountains classification Vuelta a Castilla y León
5th Overall Volta ao Alentejo
2005
3rd Time trial, National Road Championships
2010
3rd Time trial, National Road Championships
5th Overall Volta a Portugal
6th Overall Troféu Joaquim Agostinho
2011
3rd Time trial, National Road Championships
4th Overall Vuelta a Asturias
5th Overall Volta a Portugal

1st Stage 3

9th Overall Troféu Joaquim Agostinho
2013
5th Overall Volta a Portugal
10th Overall Troféu Joaquim Agostinho
2014
7th Overall Troféu Joaquim Agostinho
2015
2nd Overall GP Internacional do Guadiana
7th Overall Troféu Joaquim Agostinho
9th Overall Volta a Portugal
2016
2nd Overall Troféu Joaquim Agostinho
