= David Blanco =

Spanish racing cyclist

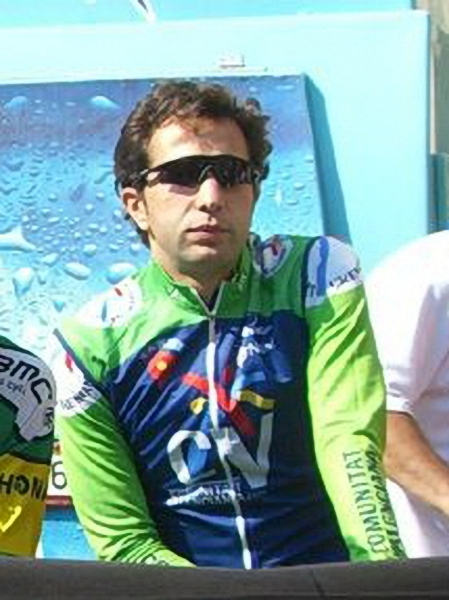

Personal information
- Full name: David Blanco Rodríguez
- Born: 3 March 1975 (age 51) Bern, Switzerland

Cycling career
- Sport: Cycling
- Current team: Retired
- Discipline: Road
- Role: Rider
- Rider type: All-rounder

Professional teams
- 2000–2001: Paredes Rota dos Móveis–Tintas VIP
- 2002: ASC–Vila do Conde
- 2003: Porta da Ravessa–Tavira
- 2004–2006: Comunidad Valenciana–Kelme
- 2007–2010: Duja–Tavira
- 2011: Geox–TMC
- 2012: Efapel–Glassdrive

David Blanco Rodríguez (born 3 March 1975) is a Spanish former professional cyclist, who rode professionally between 2000 and 2012.

== Career ==
Born in Bern, Switzerland, Blanco began his professional career in 2000 with the Portuguese team Paredes Rota dos Móveis–Tintas VIP. His first success was in 2003, when he won a stage of the GP CTT Correios de Portugal, racing with Porta da Ravessa–Tavira. Then he switched to the Comunidad Valenciana–Kelme team. After winning the Volta a Portugal in 2006, he joined a Portuguese team, Duja–Tavira. In 2008 he would grab a second win in the Volta a Portugal, the main cycling competition in Portugal, and in 2009 after he placed second, first place Nuno Ribeiro was disqualified after he tested positive for CERA, therefore making Blanco the winner of the 2009 Volta a Portugal as well. In 2010 he would win two stages in the Volta and claim another overall title. Then in 2012 he would grab another stage win and secure his fifth Volta a Portugal title eclipsing Marco Chagas, who dominated the race in the mid 1980s, to give him more wins in this race than any rider in its long history.

== Major results ==
2003
2nd Overall GP CTT Correios de Portugal

1st Stage 3

2004
2nd Trofeo Manacor
3rd Overall Challenge Mallorca
3rd Overall Vuelta a la Comunidad Valenciana
10th Overall Vuelta a España

2005
3rd Overall Vuelta a Castilla y León

2006
1st Overall Volta a Portugal

1st Stages 8 & 10

3rd Overall Troféu Joaquim Agostinho

2007
1st Overall Grand Prix Internacional Paredes Rota dos Móveis

1st Stage 3

1st Overall Volta ao Sotavento Algarvio

1st Stage 2b (ITT)

2008
1st Overall Volta a Portugal
2nd Overall Volta ao Alentejo

2009
1st Overall Volta a Portugal

1st Stages 9 & 10 (ITT)

5th Overall Troféu Joaquim Agostinho
7th Klasika Primavera
9th Overall Volta ao Alentejo

2010
1st Overall Volta a Portugal

1st Stages 4 & 7

1st Overall Volta ao Alentejo

1st Stage 3

2nd Overall Grande Prémio de Liberty Seguros
2nd Overall Troféu Joaquim Agostinho
8th Overall Vuelta a Asturias

2011
9th Overall Vuelta a Murcia
10th Gran Premio di Lugano

2012
1st Overall Volta a Portugal

1st Stage 8

7th Overall Vuelta a Asturias
10th Overall Vuelta a Castilla y León
