= 2011 Vuelta a Asturias =

Race details
- Dates: 28 April–2 May 2011
- Stages: 5
- Winning time: 21h 31' 57"

Results
Jersey awarded to the overall winner	Winner	Javier Moreno (ESP)	(Caja Rural)
	Second	Constantino Zaballa (ESP)	(Caja Rural)
	Third	Sérgio Sousa (POR)	(Barbot–Efapel)
Jersey awarded to the points classification winner	Points	Javier Moreno (ESP)	(Caja Rural)
Jersey awarded to the mountains classification winner	Mountains	Rafael Infantino (COL)	(EPM–UNE)
Jersey awarded to the sprints classification winner	Sprints	Evgeniy Shalunov (RUS)	(Russia)

The 2011 Vuelta a Asturias was the 55th edition of the Vuelta a Asturias road cycling stage race, which was held from 28 April to 2 May 2011. The race started in Oviedo and finished at Alto del Naranco. The race was won by Javier Moreno of the Caja Rural team.

== General classification ==
Final general classification

Rank	Rider	Team	Time
1	Javier Moreno (ESP)	Caja Rural	21h 31' 57"
2	Constantino Zaballa (ESP)	Caja Rural	+ 9"
3	Sérgio Sousa (POR)	Barbot–Efapel	+ 1' 03"
4	Hernâni Brôco (POR)	LA–Antarte	+ 1' 16"
5	Luis Pasamontes (ESP)	Movistar Team	+ 2' 10"
6	José Herrada (ESP)	Caja Rural	+ 2' 42"
7	Juan Pablo Suárez (COL)	EPM–UNE	+ 3' 53"
8	Christian Meier (CAN)	UnitedHealthcare	+ 4' 27"
9	Giovanny Báez (COL)	EPM–UNE	+ 5' 14"
10	Alejandro Marque (ESP)	Onda	+ 5' 26"
