= Sérgio Sousa =

Portuguese bicycle racer

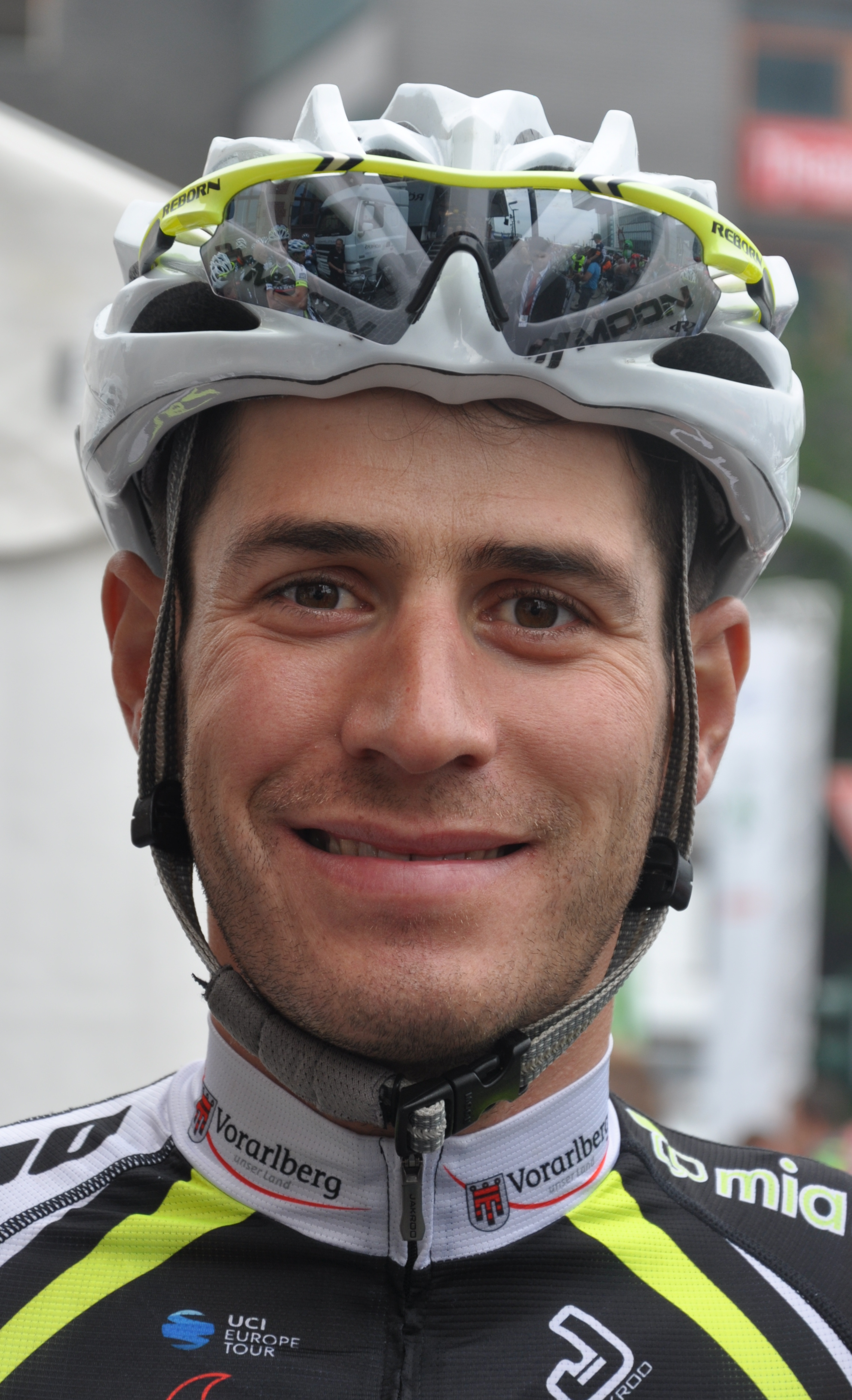
- Sousa in 2016

Personal information
- Full name: Sérgio Ferreira Sousa
- Born: 11 October 1983 (age 43) Santo Tirso, Portugal
- Height: 1.82 m (6 ft 0 in)
- Weight: 68 kg (150 lb)

Cycling career
- Sport: Cycling
- Current team: Retired
- Discipline: Road
- Role: Rider

Professional teams
- 2005–2010: Carvalhelhos–Boavista
- 2011–2014: Barbot–Efapel
- 2015: LA Alumínios–Antarte
- 2016: Team Vorarlberg

Sérgio Ferreira Sousa (born 11 October 1983) is a Portuguese former cyclist, who rode professionally between 2005 and 2016.

== Major results ==
2006
9th Overall Volta ao Alentejo
2008
3rd Overall Vuelta a Extremadura
8th Overall Troféu Joaquim Agostinho
2009
4th Overall Troféu Joaquim Agostinho
2010
2nd Time trial, National Road Championships
4th Overall Troféu Joaquim Agostinho
2011
3rd Overall Vuelta a Asturias
8th Overall Volta a Portugal
10th Vuelta a La Rioja
2012
1st Mountains classification Volta ao Algarve
2nd Overall GP Liberty Seguros
3rd Time trial, National Road Championships
2014
National Road Championships

2nd Road race
3rd Time trial

2nd Overall GP Liberty Seguros
8th Overall Troféu Joaquim Agostinho
2015
6th Overall Volta ao Alentejo
7th Overall Volta a Portugal
2016
1st Overall Flèche du Sud

1st Stage 4
