= Francisco José Pacheco =

Spanish cyclist

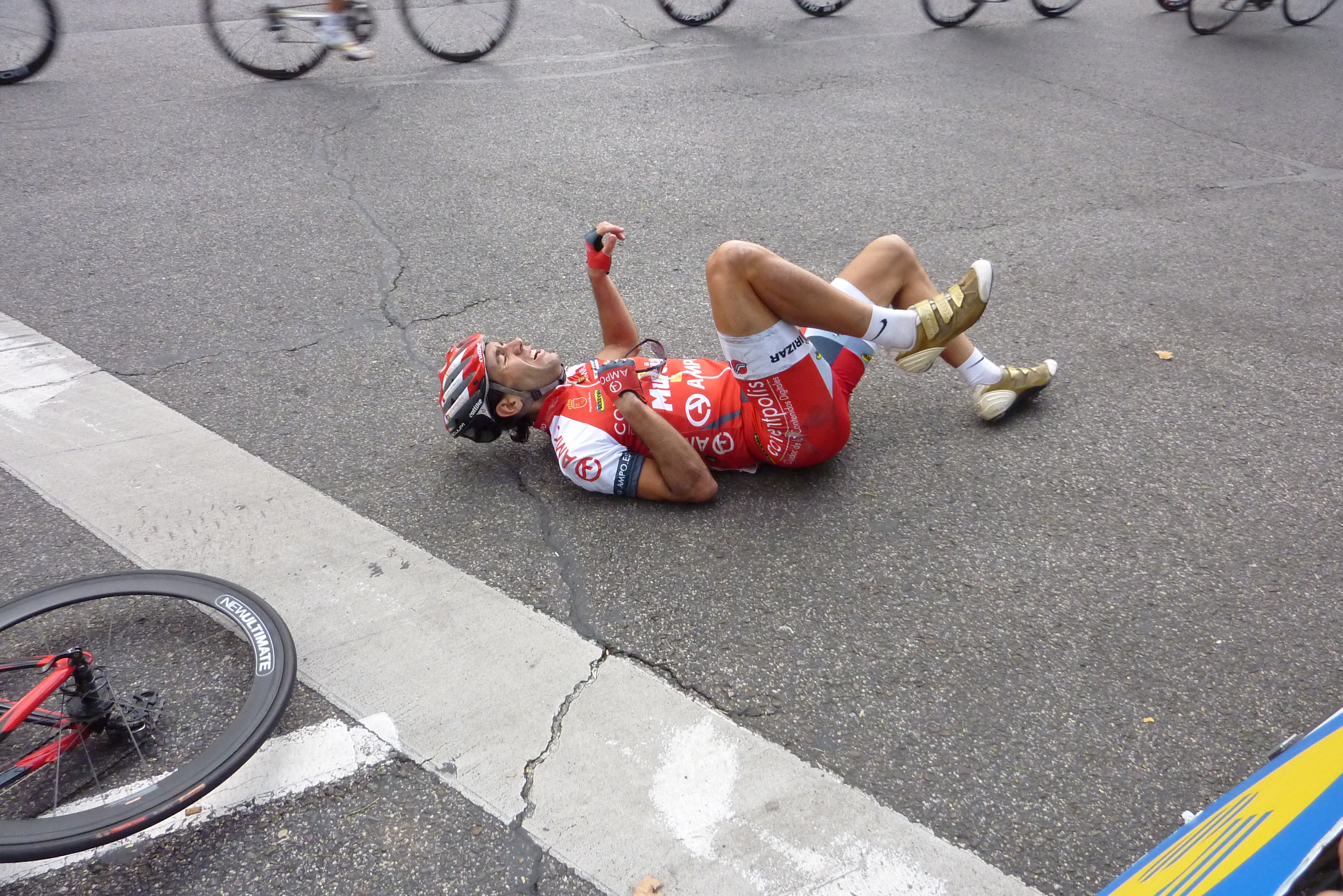
- Pacheco in a crash in 2009.

Personal information
- Full name: Francisco José Pacheco Torres
- Born: 27 March 1982 (age 44) Valdepeñas, Spain

Cycling career
- Sport: Cycling
- Current team: retired
- Discipline: Road
- Role: Rider
- Rider type: sprinter

Amateur team
- 2005–2006: Garcamps-Comundiad Valencia

Professional teams
- 2007–2008: Barbot–Halcon
- 2009: Contentpolis–Ampo
- 2010: Heraklion Kastro–Murcia
- 2012–2013: Christina Watches–Onfone

Francisco José Pacheco Torres (born 27 March 1982) is a Spanish former professional road bicycle racer. In 2005, he came third in the Spanish time trial championship for amateurs. He also finished third overall in the Vuelta a Cordoba. In the 2006 season, he won two stages at the Vuelta an Alicante and he finished third at the Trofeo Guerrita. Later, he had won a section in each of the Vuelta a Navarra, the Vuelta a León, the Vuelta a Palencia and Vuelta a Salamanca. In 2007, he made his professional debut with the Portuguese team Barbot-Halcon until 2008. In his first year there, he won a stage of the Volta a Portugal and he joined Contentpolis-Ampo in 2009. He joined the Greek cycling team Kastro Team in 2010 and Christina Watches-Dana in 2012 until 2013. On 31 December 2013, he announced his retirement from cycling at the end of the season after a six-year career.

== Major results ==
2006
1st Stage 1 Vuelta a Navarra
1st Stage 4 Vuelta Ciclista a León
2007
1st Stage 2 Volta a Portugal
2008
1st Stages 3 & 5 Vuelta a Extremadura
1st Stage 1 GP CTT Correios de Portugal
1st Stages 4 & 5 Volta a Portugal
1st Stage 2 Grande Prémio Crédito Agrícola de la Costa Azul
2010
1st Circuito de Getxo
2012
3rd National Road Race Championships
