= César Fonte =

Portuguese bicycle racer

Personal information
- Full name: César André Lima Fonte
- Born: 10 December 1986 (age 39) Viana do Castelo, Portugal
- Height: 1.70 m (5 ft 7 in)
- Weight: 60 kg (132 lb)

Cycling career
- Sport: Cycling
- Current team: Feira dos Sofás–Boavista
- Discipline: Road
- Role: Rider

Amateur teams
- 2005: Gondomar–Coração de Ouro
- 2006–2007: Santa Maria da Feira–E. Leclerc–Moreira Congelados
- 2008: Sport Lisboa e Benfica
- 2009: Cartaxo–Capital do Vinho–CC José Maria Nicolau

Professional teams
- 2010–2013: Barbot–Siper
- 2014–2016: Rádio Popular
- 2017: LA Alumínios / Metalusa Blackjack
- 2018–2019: W52 / FC Porto
- 2020: Efapel
- 2021–2022: Kelly / Simoldes / UDO
- 2023–: Rádio Popular–Paredes–Boavista

César André Lima Fonte (born 10 December 1986) is a Portuguese cyclist, who currently rides for UCI Continental team Feira dos Sofás–Boavista.

== Major results ==
2012
1st Stage 3 Volta a Portugal
2014
5th Overall Troféu Joaquim Agostinho
2015
1st Mountains classification GP Liberty Seguros
2nd Clássica Loulé
5th Klasika Primavera
2016
8th Overall Volta ao Alentejo
2018
2nd Overall Volta Internacional Cova da Beira

1st Stage 2

5th Road race, National Road Championships
6th Overall Vuelta a la Comunidad de Madrid
8th Overall GP Nacional 2 de Portugal
10th Overall Vuelta a Asturias
