= Vitória S.C. (cycling team) =

Portuguese cycling team

Vitória-ASC
Team information
- UCI code: ASC
- Registered: Portugal
- Founded: 1998
- Disbanded: 2007 (Pro Team)
- Disciplines: Road; Cross-country
- Status: Cycling team (1998-2001); Trade Team III (2002); Trade Team II (2003); Trade Team III (2004); UCI Continental (2005-2007); Cycling team (2008-present)
- Bicycles: Dynatek (2002-2005); Lapierre (2006); Colnago (2007)
- Website: Team home page

Key personnel
- General manager: António da Silva Campos
- Team manager: José Augusto Oliveira e Silva

Team name history
- 1998-2001 2002-2004 2005 2006-2007 2008-2011 2012-present: ASC–Guilhabreu–Vila do Conde; ASC–Vila do Conde; ASC–Chenco Jeans; Vitória–ASC; ASC–Vitória–RTL; ASC–KTM–Vitória
Jersey

Vitória–ASC (UCI code: ASC) was a Portuguese cycling team in the UCI Continental category that was formed from the association between União Ciclista de Vila do Conde from Vila do Conde and Vitória Sport Clube from Guimarães. The professional team was dissolved in 2007 due to a lack of support and investment in the team, however, continuing with basic training.

== History ==
União Ciclista de Vila do Conde is a Portuguese cycling team that is currently only under-23 and also races predominantly in cyclocross. The team was founded in 1998, at the time under the name ASC–Guilhabreu–Vila do Conde, and was professional between 2002 and 2007 with the intention of asserting itself as a professional road cycling team.

However, it was in the last three years, 2005, 2006 and 2007, as a professional team that it achieved the European status of UCI Continental Tour, just one category below the UCI WorldTour. The first of these three years the team operated under the name ASC–Chenco Jeans. In the following two years, the União Ciclista from Vila do Conde joined Vitória SC from Guimarães and was therefore renamed Vitória–ASC and had an initial budget of 350 thousand euros.

From 2008 to 2011, the U.C. Vila do Conde team and Vitória SC continued to be associated under a new format, based on a project to develop athletes with more emphasis on under-23 road cycling. The team was renamed ASC–Vitória–RTL and had a much smaller budget, between 70 and 80 thousand euros.

Since 2012, the team has been called ASC–KTM–Vitória in national road cycling races.

It was also in 2011 that Vitória SC began cross-country cycling with an amateur team called Vitória SC–Bikeworld, participating in regional and national competitions.

== Team roster ==
As of January 2007

Rider	Date of birth
Paulo Barroso (POR)	29 October 1972 (aged 34)
Pedro Costa (POR)	20 November 1977 (aged 29)
Ángel Edo (ESP)	4 August 1970 (aged 36)
Juan Gomis (ESP)	28 March 1978 (aged 28)
Micael Isidoro (POR)	12 August 1982 (aged 24)
José Martins (POR)	1 April 1984 (aged 22)
Yong Li Ng (MAS)	6 October 1985 (aged 21)
José Rodrigues (POR)	4 July 1978 (aged 28)
Gilberto Sampaio (POR)	6 August 1981 (aged 25)
Daniel Silva (POR)	8 June 1985 (aged 21)
José Sousa (POR)	20 September 1980 (aged 26)

== Major wins ==
2002
Overall Circuito Montañés: Óscar Serrano

Points classification: Óscar Serrano
Stage 4: Rafael Milá
Stage 5 & 7: Óscar Serrano

Stage 1 Volta ao Alentejo: Rubén Galván
Portuguese Under-23 Time Trial Championship: Sérgio Paulinho
Teams classification Volta a Portugal do Futuro (Note: The riders on the squad were Sérgio Paulinho, Hermano Vieira, Sérgio Ribeiro, Bruno Pires, Gilberto Sampaio, Bruno Neves and Ricardo Santos)

Points classification: Sérgio Paulinho
Mountains classification: Sérgio Paulinho
Prologue, Stage 2, 3 & 4: Sérgio Paulinho

2003
Sprints classification Volta ao Algarve: Óscar Serrano
Points classification Circuito Montañés: Óscar Serrano
Stage 5a & 6
Stage 3 Volta a Portugal: Victoriano Fernández
2004
Young rider classification GP M.R. Cortez–Mitsubishi: Sérgio Ribeiro
Sprints classification Volta ao Alentejo: Óscar Serrano
2005
Stage 1 Volta a Portugal: Fidel Chacón

2006
Stage 1 GP Abimota: Pedro Costa

2007
Winner Clássica de Amarante: José Rodrigues
Winner Circuito de São Bernardo, Alcobaça: Gilberto Sampaio
Winner Circuito de Nafarros: José Rodrigues
Stage 4b GP Vinhos da Estremadura: José Rodrigues Points classification: José Rodrigues

2010
Stage 3 Volta às Terras de Santa Maria Feira: Bruno Borges
Winner of Portuguese Under-23 Cup: Bruno Borges

2011
Winner of Troféu Festival da Bicicleta, cyclocross, Elite/Under-23: Mário Costa
National Championship, Track, Speed, Under-23: Leonel Coutinho
Stage 3 & 5 Volta a Portugal do Futuro: Leonel Coutinho
2012
Stage 1 Volta a Portugal do Futuro: David Rodrigues
Mountains classification Under-23 Stage 1 GP Liberty Seguros: Rui Barros
Young rider classification Under-23 GP Liberty Seguros: David Rodrigues

== Notable cyclists ==
Some Portuguese cyclists passed through Vitória-ASC, such as:

- Sérgio Paulinho
- Sérgio Ribeiro
- Bruno Pires
- Bruno Neves
- Rui Costa
- José Mendes
- Daniel Silva
- Márcio Barbosa
- Bruno Lima
- João Cabreira
- Mário Costa
- David Rodrigues
- Pedro Costa
