= Daniel Eduardo Silva =

Portuguese bicycle racer

Personal information
- Full name: Daniel Eduardo Moreira Silva
- Born: 8 June 1985 (age 41)
- Height: 1.82 m (6 ft 0 in)
- Weight: 59 kg (130 lb)

Cycling career
- Sport: Cycling
- Discipline: Road
- Role: Rider

Professional teams
- 2007: Vitória–ASC
- 2008–2010: Centro Ciclismo de Loulé
- 2011–2016: Onda
- 2017: Soul Brasil Pro Cycling
- 2018–2020: Rádio Popular–Boavista

Daniel Eduardo Moreira Silva (born 8 June 1985) is a Portuguese cyclist, who most recently rode for UCI Continental team Rádio Popular–Boavista.

== Major results ==
2009
1st Overall GP Liberty Seguros
2011
10th Overall Volta a Portugal
2012
4th Overall Vuelta a Guatemala
4th Overall Volta a Portugal
2013
1st Stage 1 Volta ao Alentejo
6th Overall Volta a Portugal
2015
8th Overall Volta a Portugal
2016
3rd Overall Volta a Portugal
