= Cândido Barbosa =

Portuguese cyclist

Personal information
- Full name: Cândido Joaquim Venda Moreira Barbosa
- Born: 31 December 1974 (age 51) Rebordosa, Portugal
- Height: 5 ft 8 in (173 cm)
- Weight: 159 lb (72 kg)

Cycling career
- Sport: Cycling
- Current team: Retired
- Discipline: Road
- Role: All-rounder

Amateur teams
- 1995–1996: W52–Paredes Movel
- 1997: Maía–Jumbo–Cin

Professional teams
- 1998–2001: Banesto
- 2002–2007: Paredes Rota dos Móveis–Antarte VIP
- 2008: Benfica
- 2009–2010: Palmeiras–Resort–Tavira

Cândido Joaquim Venda Moreira Barbosa (born 31 December 1974, in Rebordosa, Portugal) is a former professional road racing cyclist from 1995 to 2010, where he decided to end his career as a professional road racing cyclist due to a serious injury on both of his knees.

== Major results ==
1995
Volta ao Algarve

1st Stages 3 & 6

1996
Volta ao Algarve

1st Stages 1 & 2

1997
1st Overall Volta ao Algarve

1st Stages 1, 2, 3, 4, 5 & 6

1st Porto–Lisboa
1999
Volta ao Algarve

1st Stages 1 & 2

2001
1st Stage 4 Volta a Portugal
2002
1st Overall Volta ao Algarve

1st Stages 3 & 4

Volta a Portugal

1st Stages 3 & 6

2003
1st Stage 3 Volta ao Algarve
Volta a Portugal

1st Stages 1, 4, 7 & 8

2004
1st Overall GP CTT Correios de Portugal

1st Stages 1 & 3

1st Stage 2 Volta ao Algarve
2nd Overall Volta a Portugal

1st Stage 2

2005
1st Time trial, National Road Championships
1st Overall Volta ao Distrito de Santarém

1st Stage 1

1st Troféu Sergio Paulinho
1st Stage 3 GP Internacional Paredes Rota dos Móveis
1st Stage 3 Volta ao Alentejo
2nd Overall Volta a Portugal

1st Stages 2, 6 & 7

2006
1st Stage 1 Volta a Portugal
2007
1st Road race, National Road Championships
1st Stage 2 GP Internacional Paredes Rota dos Móveis
2nd Overall Volta a Portugal

1st Stages 3, 4, 5 & 8

2008
Volta a Portugal

1st Stages 6 & 8

2009
Volta ao Alentejo

1st Stages 4 & 5

GP Internacional Paredes Rota dos Móveis

1st Stages 2 & 3

2010
1st Stage 10 Volta a Portugal
