= Davide Ricci Bitti =

Italian cyclist

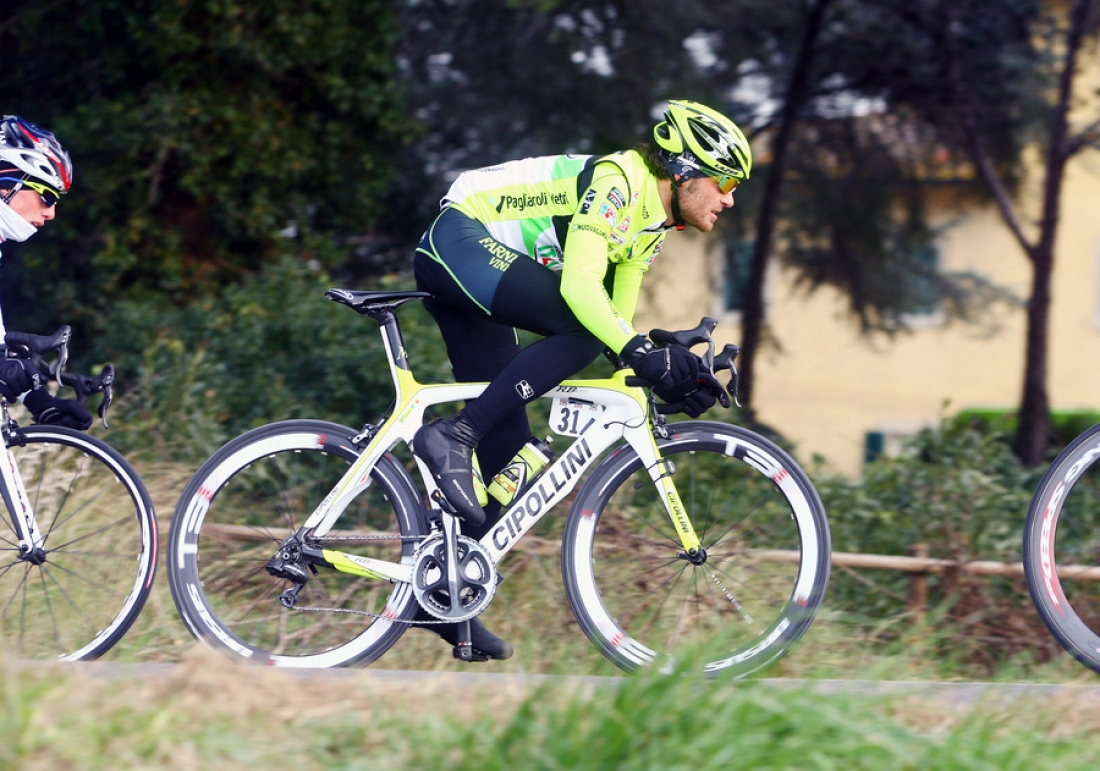
- Ricci Bitti in 2012

Personal information
- Born: 12 February 1982 (age 44) Medicina, Italy
- Height: 1.80 m (5 ft 11 in)
- Weight: 60 kg (132 lb)

Cycling career
- Sport: Cycling
- Current team: Retired
- Discipline: Road
- Role: Rider

Amateur teams
- 2006–2008: Finauto D'Etoffe - Zoccorinese
- 2020–2021: Argon18–Hicari–Stemax

Professional team
- 2009–2012: ISD

Davide Ricci Bitti (born 12 February 1984) is an Italian former professional road cyclist.

In 2020 Bitti started racing again but this time as an amateur riding for Argon18–Hicari–Stemax. Bitti said "he competes for the sake of being with friends".

== Career ==
He rode in the 2011 Giro d'Italia and finished in 148th place. In Stage 3 of the Giro Bitti was part of the four-man break which formed 30 km into the 173 km stage. Working with his fellow break-away riders they achieved a 3-minute gap fairly quickly. With 25 km to go Gianluca Brambilla attacked over a climb followed closely by Pavel Brutt this surge in pace up the hill caused Bitti to lose contact with the breakaway. He would get caught by the Peloton with 2 km to go. He would finish 194th on the stage 6'03" down on the winner. It wasn't until Stage 12 of the race that Bitti was in another breakaway. Once again there were four riders this time they established their break at 4 km from the start. At 20 km in they had a lead of4 minutes but with HTC–Highroad setting the pace behind, for their sprinter Mark Cavendish, the lead never exceeded 4 minutes. At 25 km to go the quartet had a lead of 2 minutes. By 12 km to go they had been caught as HTC–Highroad set up the sprint. Bitti finished the stage in 145th not losing any time. In August at the Volta a Portugal Bitti claimed his two best results of the season. The 2.2 km Prologue where he finished in seventh place. Then in Stage 9 he came third in the mountain sprint to the line. Later in the season at the Giro dell'Emilia Bitti was once again in the break-away of the day gaining a lead of over 8 minutes 47 km into the race. Their lead fell steadily after that with all the breakaway caught. Bitti then abandoned the race.

== Major results ==
2005
1st Stage 1 Giro Ciclistico Pesche Nettarine di Romagna
6th Giro del Casentino
8th Targa Crocifisso
2006
2nd Giro del Montalbano
2007
1st Giro del Compitese
1st GP Industria Casini
3rd Coppa San Geo
5th Coppa Guinigi
2008
3rd Trofeo FPT Tapparo
4th GP Enel Monte Amiata
