= Filipe Cardoso =

Portuguese cyclist

Personal information
- Full name: Filipe Duarte Cardoso Sousa
- Born: 15 May 1984 (age 42)
- Height: 1.78 m (5 ft 10 in)
- Weight: 70 kg (154 lb)

Cycling career
- Sport: Cycling
- Current team: Retired
- Discipline: Road
- Role: Rider
- Rider type: Sprinter; Domestique; Rouleur

Professional teams
- 2006–2009: LA Alumínios–Liberty Seguros
- 2010: LA Alumínios–Rota dos Móveis
- 2011–2016: Barbot–Efapel
- 2017–2018: Rádio Popular–Boavista
- 2019: Vito–Feirense–PNB

Filipe Duarte Cardoso Sousa (born 15 May 1984) is a Portuguese former professional cyclist, who rode professionally between 2006 and 2019.

== Major results ==
2004
2nd Time trial, National Under-23 Road Championships
2005
1st Time trial, National Under-23 Road Championships
2006
3rd Road race, National Under-23 Road Championships
2007
1st Stage 7 Vuelta Chihuahua Internacional
2008
8th Overall Vuelta Ciclista a la Rioja
2009
1st Stage 2 Volta ao Alentejo
1st Stage 1 GP Liberty Seguros
2nd Overall La Tropicale Amissa Bongo
2011
1st Overall Grande Prémio Crédito Agrícola de Costa Azul

1st Stage 3

2nd Overall Volta ao Alentejo

1st Stage 4

2nd GP Liberty Seguros
3rd Road race, National Road Championships
2012
2nd Overall Volta ao Alentejo

1st Stage 4

2015
1st Stage 4 Volta a Portugal
