= 2018 Vuelta a Asturias =

2018 UCI Europe Tour

Race details
- Dates: April 27–29, 2018
- Stages: 3
- Distance: 460 km (285.8 mi)
- Winning time: 11h 22' 26"

Results
Jersey awarded to the overall winner	Winner	Richard Carapaz (ECU)	(Movistar Team)
	Second	Jonathan Caicedo (ECU)	(Medellín)
	Third	Ricardo Mestre (POR)	(W52 / FC Porto)
Jersey awarded to the points classification winner	Points	Jonathan Caicedo (ECU)	(Medellín)
Jersey awarded to the mountains classification winner	Mountains	Fernando Orjuela (COL)	(Team Manzana Postobón)
Jersey awarded to the sprints classification winner	Sprints	João Rodrigues (POR)	(W52 / FC Porto)
	Team	Movistar Team	

The 2018 Vuelta a Asturias was the 61st edition of the Vuelta a Asturias cycling stage race, that took place over three stages from 27 to 29 2018. The defending champion was Raúl Alarcón (W52 / FC Porto / Mestre da Cor). Richard Carapaz (Movistar Team) won the race.

== Route ==
The race includes three road stages on consecutive days.

Stage characteristics and winners
Stage	Date	Route	Distance	Type	Winner
1	27 April	Oviedo to Pola de Lena	176 km (109 mi)	Medium-mountain stage	Dmitry Strakhov (RUS)
2	28 April	Soto de Ribera to Alto del Acebo	166 km (103 mi)	Mountain stage	Richard Carapaz (ECU)
3	29 April	Cangas del Narcea to Oviedo	118 km (73 mi)	Hilly stage	Ricardo Mestre (POR)
Total		460 km (286 mi)			

== Teams ==
A total of 15 teams will race in the 2018 Vuelta a Asturias.

UCI WorldTeams

- Movistar Team

UCI Professional Continental teams

- Burgos BH
- Caja Rural–Seguros RGA
- Euskadi–Murias

UCI Continental teams

- Team Manzana Postobón
- Israel Cycling Academy
- Coldeportes–Zenú–Sello Rojo
- Team Ukyo
- Rádio Popular–Boavista
- W52 / FC Porto
- Aviludo–Louletano
- Lokosphinx
- Medellín
- Fundación Euskadi
- Bicicletas Strongman–Colombia Coldeportes

== Stages ==
=== Stage 1 ===
27 April 2018 — Oviedo to Pola de Lena, 176 km (109 mi)

Result of Stage 1
Rank	Rider	Team	Time
1	Dmitry Strakhov (RUS)	Lokosphinx	4h 17' 06"
2	Jonathan Caicedo (ECU)	Medellín	+ 0"
3	Sergio Higuita (COL)	Team Manzana Postobón	+ 0"
4	Eduard Prades (ESP)	Euskadi–Murias	+ 0"
5	Richard Carapaz (ECU)	Movistar Team	+ 0"
6	Nathan Earle (AUS)	Israel Cycling Academy	+ 0"
7	Benjamín Prades (ESP)	Team Ukyo	+ 0"
8	César Fonte (POR)	W52 / FC Porto	+ 0"
9	Domingos Gonçalves (POR)	Rádio Popular–Boavista	+ 0"
10	Sergio Pardilla (ESP)	Caja Rural–Seguros RGA	+ 0"

General classification after Stage 1
Rank	Rider	Team	Time
1	Dmitry Strakhov (RUS)	Lokosphinx	3h 35' 08"
2	Jonathan Caicedo (ECU)	Medellín	+ 4"
3	Sergio Higuita (COL)	Team Manzana Postobón	+ 6"
4	Eduard Prades (ESP)	Euskadi–Murias	+ 10"
5	Richard Carapaz (ECU)	Movistar Team	+ 10"
6	Nathan Earle (AUS)	Israel Cycling Academy	+ 10"
7	Benjamín Prades (ESP)	Team Ukyo	+ 10"
8	César Fonte (POR)	W52 / FC Porto	+ 10"
9	Domingos Gonçalves (POR)	Rádio Popular–Boavista	+ 10"
10	Sergio Pardilla (ESP)	Caja Rural–Seguros RGA	+ 10"

=== Stage 2 ===
28 April 2018 — Soto de Ribera to Alto del Acebo, 166 km (103 mi)

Result of Stage 2
Rank	Rider	Team	Time
1	Richard Carapaz (ECU)	Movistar Team	4h 24' 14"
2	Jonathan Caicedo (ECU)	Medellín	+ 42"
3	Rubén Fernández (ESP)	Movistar Team	+ 50"
4	Robinson Chalapud (COL)	Medellín	+ 50"
5	Antonio Pedrero (ESP)	Movistar Team	+ 1' 05"
6	Nathan Earle (AUS)	Israel Cycling Academy	+ 1' 07"
7	Sergio Pardilla (ESP)	Caja Rural–Seguros RGA	+ 1' 25"
8	Ricardo Mestre (POR)	W52 / FC Porto	+ 1' 34"
9	Joaquim Silva (POR)	Caja Rural–Seguros RGA	+ 1' 34"
10	Dmitry Strakhov (RUS)	Lokosphinx	+ 1' 34"

General classification after Stage 2
Rank	Rider	Team	Time
1	Richard Carapaz (ECU)	Movistar Team	8h 41' 10"
2	Jonathan Caicedo (ECU)	Medellín	+ 40"
3	Robinson Chalapud (COL)	Medellín	+ 1' 00"
4	Rubén Fernández (ESP)	Movistar Team	+ 1' 05"
5	Nathan Earle (AUS)	Israel Cycling Academy	+ 1' 17"
6	Antonio Pedrero (ESP)	Movistar Team	+ 1' 30"
7	Dmitry Strakhov (RUS)	Lokosphinx	+ 1' 34"
8	Sergio Pardilla (ESP)	Caja Rural–Seguros RGA	+ 1' 35"
9	Joaquim Silva (POR)	Caja Rural–Seguros RGA	+ 1' 44"
10	Ricardo Mestre (POR)	W52 / FC Porto	+ 1' 44"

=== Stage 3 ===
29 April 2018 — Cangas del Narcea to Oviedo, 118 km (73 mi)

Result of Stage 3
Rank	Rider	Team	Time
1	Ricardo Mestre (POR)	W52 / FC Porto	2h 40' 42"
2	Alexander Evtushenko (RUS)	Lokosphinx	+ 9"
3	Benjamín Prades (ESP)	Team Ukyo	+ 34"
4	Rubén Fernández (ESP)	Movistar Team	+ 34"
5	Nathan Earle (AUS)	Israel Cycling Academy	+ 34"
6	César Fonte (POR)	W52 / FC Porto	+ 34"
7	Eduard Prades (ESP)	Euskadi–Murias	+ 34"
8	Richard Carapaz (ECU)	Movistar Team	+ 34"
9	Luís Gomes (POR)	Rádio Popular–Boavista	+ 34"
10	Jonathan Caicedo (ECU)	Medellín	+ 34"

== Classification leadership table ==
The race included four principal classifications, the leaders of which were awarded jerseys. The leader in the general classification wore a blue jersey; the leader in the points classification wore a green jersey; the leader in the mountains classification wore a white jersey, while the leader of the intermediate sprints classification wore a black and white newspaper-style jersey sponsored by La Nueva España.

Classification leadership by stage
Stage	Winner	General classification	Points classification	Mountains classification	Sprints classification	Team classification
1	Dmitry Strakhov	Dmitry Strakhov	Dmitry Strakhov	Fernando Orjuela	João Rodrigues	Medellín
2	Richard Carapaz	Richard Carapaz	Jonathan Caicedo	Fernando Orjuela	João Rodrigues	Movistar Team
3	Ricardo Mestre	Richard Carapaz	Jonathan Caicedo	Fernando Orjuela	João Rodrigues	Movistar Team
Final		Richard Carapaz	Jonathan Caicedo	Fernando Orjuela	João Rodrigues	Movistar Team

== Final standings ==
Legend
General classification	Denotes the winner of the general classification	Points classification	Denotes the leader of the points classification
Mountains classification	Denotes the leader of the mountains classification	Sprints classification	Denotes the winner of the sprints classification

=== General classification ===
Final general classification (1–10)
Rank	Rider	Team	Time
1	Richard Carapaz (ECU)	Movistar Team	11h 22' 26"
2	Jonathan Caicedo (ECU)	Medellín	+ 40"
3	Ricardo Mestre (POR)	W52 / FC Porto	+ 59"
4	Robinson Chalapud (COL)	Medellín	+ 1' 00"
5	Rubén Fernández (ESP)	Movistar Team	+ 1' 05"
6	Nathan Earle (AUS)	Israel Cycling Academy	+ 1' 17"
7	Sergio Pardilla (ESP)	Caja Rural–Seguros RGA	+ 1' 35"
8	Antonio Pedrero (ESP)	Movistar Team	+ 1' 37"
9	Joaquim Silva (POR)	Caja Rural–Seguros RGA	+ 1' 44"
10	César Fonte (POR)	W52 / FC Porto	+ 2' 00"

=== Points classification ===
Final points classification (1–10)
Rank	Rider	Team	Points
1	Jonathan Caicedo (ECU)	Medellín	46
2	Richard Carapaz (ECU)	Movistar Team	45
3	Ricardo Mestre (POR)	W52 / FC Porto	33
4	Nathan Earle (AUS)	Israel Cycling Academy	32
5	Dmitry Strakhov (RUS)	Lokosphinx	31
6	Rubén Fernández (ESP)	Movistar Team	30
7	Alexander Evtushenko (RUS)	Lokosphinx	25
8	Benjamín Prades (ESP)	Team Ukyo	25
9	Eduard Prades (ESP)	Euskadi–Murias	24
10	César Fonte (POR)	W52 / FC Porto	21

=== Mountains classification ===
Final mountains classification (1–10)
Rank	Rider	Team	Points
1	Fernando Orjuela (COL)	Team Manzana Postobón	14
2	Fabio Duarte (COL)	Team Manzana Postobón	12
3	Omar Mendoza (COL)	Medellín	12
4	Richard Carapaz (ECU)	Movistar Team	11
5	Jonathan Caicedo (ECU)	Medellín	8
6	Hernán Aguirre (COL)	Team Manzana Postobón	7
7	Ricardo Mestre (POR)	W52 / FC Porto	6
8	Rubén Fernández (ESP)	Movistar Team	6
9	Josu Zabala (ESP)	Caja Rural–Seguros RGA	5
10	Robinson Chalapud (COL)	Medellín	4

=== Sprints classification ===
Final sprints classification (1–3)
Rank	Rider	Team	Points
1	Marcos Jurado (POR)	W52 / FC Porto	8
2	Hernán Aguirre (COL)	Team Manzana Postobón	6
3	Fabio Duarte (COL)	Team Manzana Postobón	4

=== Team classification ===
Final team classification (1–5)
Rank	Team	Time
1	Movistar Team	34h 10' 14"
2	Medellín	+ 2' 19"
3	W52 / FC Porto	+ 2' 51"
4	Caja Rural–Seguros RGA	+ 5' 56"
5	Euskadi–Murias	+ 6' 24"
