= Ricardo Mestre =

Portuguese racing cyclist (born 1983)

Personal information
- Full name: Ricardo Jorge Mestre Correia
- Born: 11 September 1983 (age 43) Castro Marim, Portugal
- Height: 1.70 m (5 ft 7 in)
- Weight: 58 kg (128 lb; 9 st)

Cycling career
- Sport: Cycling
- Current team: Suspended
- Discipline: Road
- Role: Rider
- Rider type: Breakaway specialist; Climber

Amateur team
- 2002–2004: CC Tavira

Professional teams
- 2005–2012: Duja–Tavira
- 2013: Euskaltel–Euskadi
- 2014: Efapel–Glassdrive
- 2015: Tavira
- 2016–2022: W52 / FC Porto / Porto Canal

Major wins
- Stage races Volta a Portugal (2011) Troféu Joaquim Agostinho (2011, 2012)

Ricardo Jorge Mestre Correia (born 11 September 1983) is a Portuguese professional road bicycle racer, who last rode for UCI Continental team W52 / FC Porto.

On 4 October 2022, he received a three-year ban by UCI for doping.

== Major results ==
2006
Volta a Portugal

1st Mountains classification
1st Young rider classification
1st Stage 6

2010
1st Overall GP do Minho
2nd Overall Tour of Bulgaria

1st Stage 6

8th Overall Volta a Portugal
2011
1st Overall Troféu Joaquim Agostinho

1st Stage 1

1st Overall Volta a Portugal

1st Stage 7

7th Overall Tour of Bulgaria
2012
1st Overall Troféu Joaquim Agostinho

1st Stage 3

2017
6th Overall Vuelta a Asturias
2018
3rd Overall Vuelta a Asturias

1st Stage 3

10th Overall Vuelta Ciclista Comunidad de Madrid
2019
2nd Road race, National Road Championships

== See also ==
- Doping in sport
- List of doping cases in cycling
