= Alejandro Marque =

Spanish cyclist

Personal information
- Full name: Alejandro Manuel Marque Porto
- Born: 23 October 1981 (age 44) Pontevedra, Spain
- Height: 1.82 m (6 ft 0 in)
- Weight: 68 kg (150 lb)

Cycling career
- Sport: Cycling
- Current team: Team Tavira / Crédito Agrícola
- Discipline: Road
- Role: Rider

Amateur team
- 2014: Super Froiz

Professional teams
- 2004–2005: Carvalhelhos–Boavista
- 2006–2007: Imoholding–Loulé Jardim Hotel
- 2008–2010: Palmeiras–Resort–Tavira
- 2011: Onda
- 2012: Carmim–Prio
- 2013: OFM–Quinta da Lixa
- 2015: Efapel
- 2016: LA Alumínios–Antarte
- 2017–: Sporting / Tavira

Alejandro Manuel Marque Porto (born 23 October 1981 in Pontevedra) is a Spanish cyclist, who currently rides for UCI Continental team Team Tavira / Crédito Agrícola.

== Career ==
Marque was in fine form at the 2013 Volta a Portugal, winning the ninth stage, a 35.6-kilometre (22.1-mile) individual time trial, before winning the race overall. This earned him a contract with the Movistar Team for the 2014 season. However, Marque tested positive for betamethasone during the race. Marque claimed that the UCI had known about the use of the substance as he had used in the days leading up to the race to treat a bad knee. The result still stands, but Marque never went to the Movistar Team as a clause in the contract he had signed allowed the team to terminate the contract if there were any problems with doping.

== Major results ==
2006
9th Overall Vuelta a Extremadura
2007
10th Overall Volta ao Distrito de Santarém
2008
8th Overall Volta ao Alentejo
2009
1st Stage 4 Grande Prémio Crédito Agrícola de Costa Azul
7th Overall Volta ao Alentejo
8th Overall Troféu Joaquim Agostinho
9th Overall Volta ao Algarve
2010
2nd Overall Volta ao Alentejo
2011
3rd Overall Troféu Joaquim Agostinho
10th Overall Vuelta a Asturias
2012
1st Stage 9 (ITT) Volta a Portugal
3rd Time trial, National Road Championships
5th Overall Vuelta a Asturias

1st Stage 1

2013
1st Overall Volta a Portugal

1st Stage 9 (ITT)

3rd Overall Volta ao Alentejo
2015
3rd Overall Volta a Portugal
9th Overall Vuelta a Castilla y León
2017
5th Overall Vuelta a Asturias
5th Overall Volta a Portugal
2018
1st Overall Tour of China II
7th Overall Tour of China I
2019
7th Overall Volta ao Alentejo
8th Overall Troféu Joaquim Agostinho
2020
8th Overall Volta a Portugal
2021
3rd Overall Volta a Portugal

1st Stage 3
