= Jacob Rathe =

American road cyclist (born 1991)

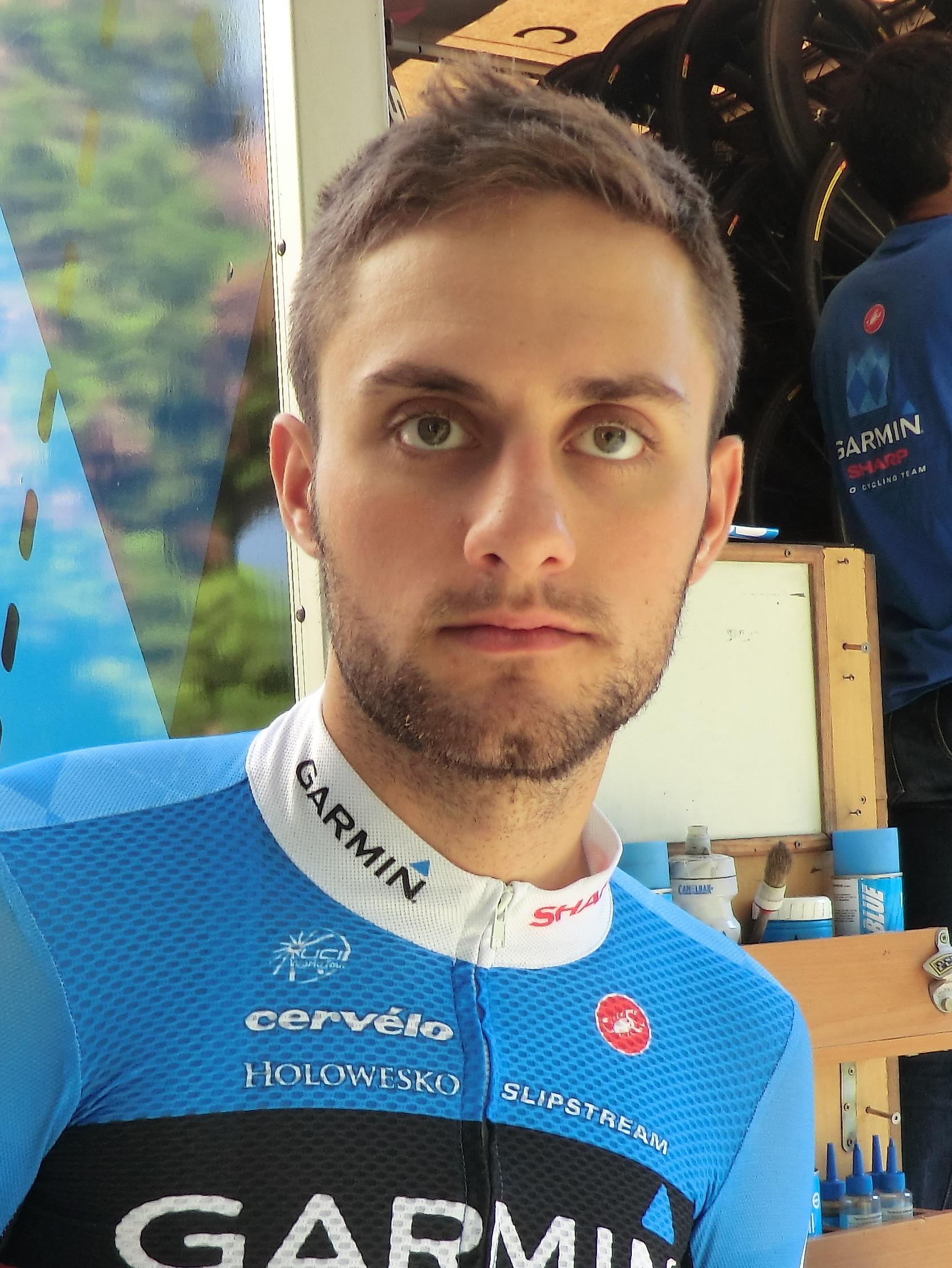
- Rathe at the 2013 Tour de l'Ain

Personal information
- Full name: Jacob Rathe
- Born: March 13, 1991 (age 35) Portland, Oregon, United States
- Height: 1.85 m (6 ft 1 in)
- Weight: 75 kg (165 lb)

Cycling career
- Sport: Cycling
- Discipline: Road
- Role: Rider
- Rider type: All-rounder

Amateur teams
- 2004–2007: Beaverton Bicycle Club
- 2007: Peninsula Cycle Club
- 2007: Redline Bicycle Team
- 2008–2009: CMG / Bike n' Hike Giant / Russell Hosner
- 2019: Ottolock

Professional teams
- 2010: Jelly Belly–Kenda
- 2011: Chipotle–Garmin Development Team
- 2012–2013: Garmin–Barracuda
- 2014–2018: Jelly Belly–Maxxis

Jacob Rathe (born March 13, 1991) is an American professional road racing cyclist, who last rode for American amateur team Ottolock. Following a two-year stint with Garmin–Sharp, Rathe signed with Jelly Belly–Maxxis for the 2014 season. Rathe was born, raised, and resides in Portland, Oregon, United States.

== Major results ==
2009
6th Overall Regio-Tour

1st Stage 1

2011
1st Stage 4 Rutas de América
1st Stage 9 Volta a Portugal
2nd Road race, National Under-23 Road Championships
3rd Paris–Roubaix Espoirs
2012
1st Stage 2 (TTT) Tour of Qatar
1st Stage 2 (TTT) Tour of Utah
2014
9th Philadelphia International Championship
2017
1st Overall Tour of Xingtai
1st Mountains classification Tour of Utah
2018
3rd Road race, National Road Championships
