= 2006 Tour de la Région Wallonne =

Race details
- Dates: 24 July–28 July 2006
- Stages: 5
- Winning time: 22h 01' 51"

Results
	Winner	Fabrizio Guidi (ITA)
	Second	Nico Sijmens (BEL)
	Third	Kurt Asle Arvesen (NOR)

The 2006 Tour de la Région Wallonne was the 33rd edition of the Tour de Wallonie cycle race and was held from 24 July to 28 July 2006. The race started in Flobecq and finished in Wanze. The race was won by Fabrizio Guidi.

== General classification ==
Final general classification

Rank	Rider	Time
1	Fabrizio Guidi (ITA)	22h 01' 51"
2	Nico Sijmens (BEL)	+ 12"
3	Kurt Asle Arvesen (NOR)	+ 13"
4	Aitor Galdós (ESP)	+ 15"
5	Baden Cooke (AUS)	+ 18"
6	Leonardo Bertagnolli (ITA)	+ 23"
7	Hugo Sabido (POR)	+ 25"
8	Moisés Aldape (MEX)	+ 28"
9	Aivaras Baranauskas (LTU)	+ 31"
10	Iljo Keisse (BEL)	+ 32"
