= Criterium Ciudad de Jaén =

The Criterium Ciudad de Jaén (City of Jaén Criterion), also known as the Criterio Internacional de Navidad "Ciudad de Jaén" (City of Jaén International Christmas Criterion), was an unofficial road bicycle race held annually in Jaén, Spain.

The Criterium Ciudad de Jaén was held on the last weekend of November, from 2007 to 2010, during the off-season for competitive events on the UCI World Tour circuit. The unofficial competition was created, and sponsored, by the City of Jaén Sports Council, the Province of Jaén Council of Sports, and the Regional Government of Andalusia Ministry of Tourism, Commerce and Sport.

The two day event had the riders accumulate placement points in a team time trial on day one, and a long distance all-competitors road race on day two, with the overall winner determined by total scores over the two events.

== Results ==
Year	Winner
2007	(Spain) Luis Pérez Rodríguez
2008	(Spain) Pablo Lastras
2009	(Spain) Javier Moreno
2010	(Spain) Manuel Ortega Ocaña
