= Tour of Xingtai =

Race details
- Region: China
- Discipline: Road
- Competition: UCI Asia Tour 2.2
- Type: Stage race

History
- First edition: 2017
- Editions: 3 (as of 2019)
- First winner: Jacob Rathe (USA)
- Most recent: Carlos Cobos (ESP)

The Tour of Xingtai is an annual professional road bicycle racing stage race held in China since 2017. The race is part of the UCI Asia Tour and is classified by the International Cycling Union (UCI) as a 2.2 category race.

== Past winners ==
Year	Country	Rider	Team
2017	United States	Jacob Rathe	Jelly Belly–Maxxis
2018	Italy	Damiano Cima	Nippo-Vini Fantini-Faizanè
2019	Spain	Carlos Cobos	Xingtai Bianque
