= Nuno Ribeiro =

Portuguese cyclist (born 1977)

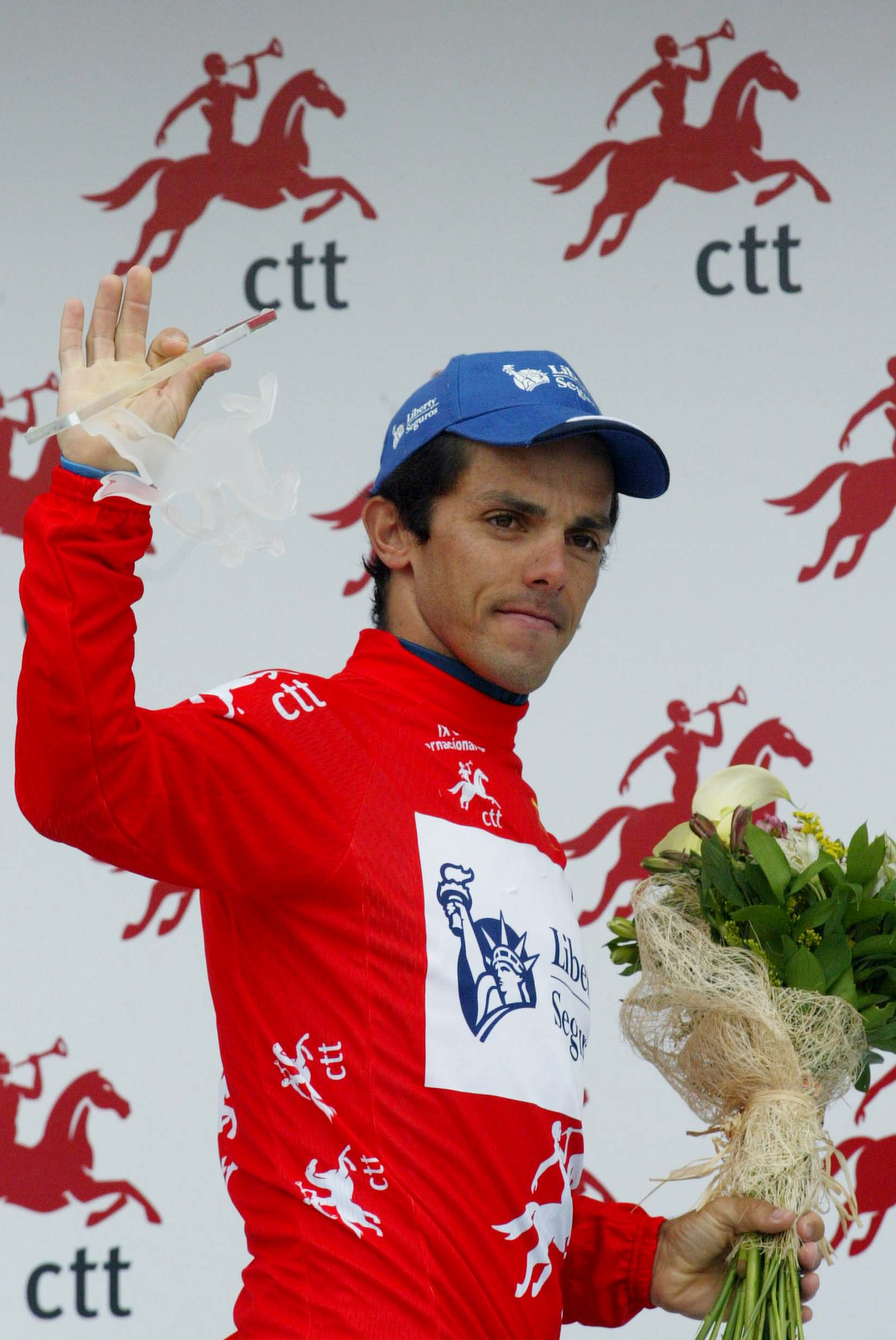

Personal information
- Full name: Nuno Jorge Ribeiro Gaspar
- Born: 9 September 1977 (age 49) Sobrado, Portugal

Cycling career
- Sport: Cycling
- Current team: W52 / FC Porto
- Discipline: Road
- Role: Rider (retired); Directeur sportif; Team manager

Professional teams
- 2000–2002: Barbot–Torrie
- 2003–2004: LA Alumínios–Pecol–Bombarral
- 2005: Liberty Seguros–Würth
- 2005–2009: LA Alumínios–Liberty Seguros
- 2012–2013: Efapel–Glassdrive
- 2014: OFM–Quinta da Lixa

Managerial team
- 2015–: W52–Quinta da Lixa

Nuno Jorge Ribeiro Gaspar (born 9 September 1977 in Sobrado, Valongo) is a Portuguese former professional road bicycle racer, who rode professionally between 2000 and 2014 for the Barbot–Torrie, Liberty Seguros–Würth, Liberty Seguros (two spells), Efapel–Glassdrive and OFM–Quinta da Lixa teams. He now works as a directeur sportif for his final professional team, UCI Continental team W52 / FC Porto.

He was the winner of the 2003 Volta a Portugal, and he also placed first in the 2009 edition, however he was later disqualified due to testing positive for CERA in a doping test and was banned for two years.

Upon returning from the ban, Ribeiro joined Efapel–Glassdrive. He remained with the team until the end of the 2013 season, when he joined OFM–Quinta da Lixa.

== Major results ==
2002
4th Gran Premio de Llodio
9th Overall Volta a Portugal
2003
1st Overall Volta a Portugal

1st Stage 5

1st Mountains classification Tour de Pologne
2nd Road race, National Road Championships
7th Overall Troféu Joaquim Agostinho
2004
2nd Road race, National Road Championships
3rd Overall Volta a Portugal
9th Overall Troféu Joaquim Agostinho
2006
5th Overall Troféu Joaquim Agostinho
6th Overall Volta ao Alentejo
2007
7th Overall GP Internacional Paredes Rota dos Móveis
2008
1st Overall GP CTT Correios de Portugal
1st Stage 8 Volta a Portugal
9th Overall GP Internacional Paredes Rota dos Móveis
2009
~~1st Overall Volta a Portugal~~

~~1st Stage 10~~

2nd Subida al Naranco
3rd Overall GP Internacional Paredes Rota dos Móveis
4th Overall Vuelta a Asturias
2012
8th Overall Volta a Portugal
2013
9th Overall Volta a Portugal
2014
9th Overall Tour do Rio

== See also ==
- List of doping cases in sport
