= Manuel Ortega Ocaña =

Spanish cyclist

Manuel Ortega Ocaña (born 7 July 1981 in Jaén) is a Spanish professional road cyclist.

He debuted professionally with the Andalucía team in 2006 (then named Andalucía–Paul Versan), with whom he was with until 2009 (then named Andalucía–CajaSur).

In 2010, Ortega won the last (of four) annual Criterium Ciudad de Jaén races, an unofficial two-day competition held during the off-season of the UCI World Tour circuit.
