= AP Hotels & Resorts–Tavira–SC Farense =

Portuguese professional cycling team

Team information
- UCI code: ATF
- Registered: Portugal
- Founded: 1979
- Discipline: Road
- Status: Continental

Key personnel
- General manager: Marcelino Teixeira
- Team managers: Vidal Fitas; Nentcho Dimitrov

Team name history
- 1986 1987 1988 1989–1995 1996 1997 1998 1999–2001 2002 2003 2004 2005–2007 2008–2009 2010 2011 2012 2013 2013–2014 2015 2016–2019 2020–2022 2023–: Tavira–Stand Custodio; Tavira–Nao Team; Tavira–Stand Custodio–Varzea; Atum Bom Petisco–Tavira; Tavira–Recer; Progecer–Tavira; Gresco–Tavira–Progecer; Gresco–Tavira; Porta da Ravessa–Zurich; Porta da Ravessa–Tavira; Würth–Atum Bom Petisco–Tavira; Duja–Tavira; Palmeiras Resort–Tavira; Palmeiras Resort–Prio; Tavira–Prio; Carmim–Prio; Carmim–Tavira; BIC–Carmim; Tavira; Sporting / Tavira; Atum General–Tavira–Maria Nova Hotel; AP Hotels & Resorts–Tavira–SC Farense
Jersey

AP Hotels & Resorts–Tavira–SC Farense (in accordance with sponsorship and naming rights agreements), also known as Clube de Ciclismo de Tavira (the official, legal name of the sports organization since its foundation) is a Portuguese professional cycling team, founded in 1979, which is based in Tavira, in the Portuguese region of Algarve. It is one of the European teams in the UCI Continental Tour.

== History ==
Founded in 1979, and the oldest Portuguese professional cycling team in continuous operation, it became professional in 1980. José Manuel Brito da Mana, known simply as Brito da Mana, was its founder and one of the longest-serving directors of the team, leaving the post in 2003. For several years, the team was sponsored by Atum Bom Petisco, a leading Portuguese canned tuna brand. From 2016 until 2019, the team had the commercial designation of Sporting Clube de Portugal/Tavira, as the result of a sponsorship from Sporting Clube de Portugal. In 2022, the Clube de Ciclismo de Tavira celebrated an agreement with SC Farense valid for three years.

== Team roster ==
As of 28 May 2023.

Rider	Date of birth
Diogo Barbosa (POR)	13 June 2000 (age 26)
Jose Bicho (POR)	4 January 2004 (age 22)
Samuel Blanco (ESP)	3 June 1994 (age 32)
Venceslau Fernandes (POR)	24 January 1996 (age 30)
Delio Fernández (ESP)	17 February 1986 (age 40)
David Livramento (POR)	18 December 1983 (age 42)

Rider	Date of birth
Rafael Lourenço (POR)	1 October 1997 (age 29)
Válter Pereira (POR)	22 February 1990 (age 36)
Carlos Salgueiro (POR)	9 June 1999 (age 27)
Rúben Simão (POR)	8 October 2000 (age 26)
Álvaro Trueba (ESP)	10 January 1993 (age 33)

== Major wins ==
1996
Stage 2 Circuito Montañés, Domingo Sánchez
1999
Overall Troféu Joaquim Agostinho, Juan Carlos Guillamón

Stage 1, Juan Carlos Guillamón

Stage 1 GP do Minho, Krassimir Vassiliev
2000
Stage 1 GP Mitsubishi, Krassimir Vassiliev
Stage 1 GP CCRLVT, Domingo Sánchez
2001
Stage 5 Volta a Portugal, Pedro Martins
2002
Stage 3 GP do Minho, Danail Petrov
Stage 10 Volta a Portugal, Danail Petrov
2003
Stage 3 Tour de Normandie, Krassimir Vassiliev
Portugal Time Trial Championships, Joaquim Andrade
Stage 3 GP CTT Correios de Portugal, David Blanco
2004
Stage 4 GP Estremadura, Joaquim Andrade
Stage 4 Volta ao Alentejo, Krassimir Vassiliev
Stage 4 Tour of Bulgaria, Nelson Vitorino
2005
Prologue (ITT) Tour de Normandie, Martín Garrido
Stage 5 Tour de Normandie, Juan Olmo
Stages 2b, 3, 6 & 7 Tour of Bulgaria, Martín Garrido
2006
Stage 3 Volta a Portugal, Martín Garrido
Stage 6 Volta a Portugal, Ricardo Mestre
Stage 9 Volta a Portugal, Krassimir Vassiliev
Stage 3 Tour of Bulgaria, Krassimir Vassiliev
Stage 6 Tour of Bulgaria, Martín Garrido
2007
Stage 3 Volta ao Distrito de Santarém, Martín Garrido
Overall GP Paredes Rota dos Moveis, David Blanco

Stage 3, David Blanco

Prologue (ITT) Volta a Portugal, Martín Garrido
2008
Overall Tour de San Luis, Martín Garrido

Prologue (ITT) & Stage 3, Martín Garrido

Stage 4 GP Paredes Rota dos Moveis, Ricardo Mestre
Stage 3 Boucles de la Mayenne, Martín Garrido
Overall Volta a Portugal, David Blanco
2009
Stages 4 & 5 Volta ao Alentejo, Cândido Barbosa
Overall GP Paredes Rota dos Moveis, Cândido Barbosa

Stages 2 & 3, Cândido Barbosa

Overall Volta a Portugal, David Blanco

Prologue (ITT) & Stage 2, Cândido Barbosa
Stages 9 & 10, David Blanco

2010
Overall Volta ao Alentejo, David Blanco

Stage 1, Cândido Barbosa
Stage 3, David Blanco

Overall GP Torres Vedras, Cândido Barbosa

Prologue (ITT) & Stages 2 & 4, Cândido Barbosa

Overall Volta a Portugal, David Blanco

Stages 4 & 7, David Blanco
Stage 10, Cândido Barbosa

Stage 6 Tour of Bulgaria, Ricardo Mestre
2011
Overall GP Torres Vedras, Ricardo Mestre

Stage 1, Ricardo Mestre

Overall Volta a Portugal, Ricardo Mestre

Stage 7, Ricardo Mestre
Stage 8, André Cardoso

2012
Stage 1 Vuelta a Asturias, Alejandro Marque
Overall Troféu Joaquim Agostinho, Ricardo Mestre

Stage 3, Ricardo Mestre

Stage 9 (ITT) Volta a Portugal, Alejandro Marque
2014
Stage 3 Volta ao Alentejo, Manuel Cardoso
Stages 1, 7, 8 & 9 Tour du Maroc, Manuel Cardoso
Stage 2 Tour du Maroc, Daniel Mestre
Angola Time Trial Championships, Igor Silva
Angola Road Race Championships, Igor Silva
Portugal Under-23 Time Trial Championships, Rafael Reis
Stage 10 Volta a Portugal, Manuel Cardoso
2015
Stage 2 Volta ao Alentejo, Manuel Cardoso
2016
Overall Troféu Joaquim Agostinho, Rinaldo Nocentini
2017
Stage 1 Volta ao Alentejo, Rinaldo Nocentini
2018
Stages 3 & 6 La Tropicale Amissa Bongo, Rinaldo Nocentini
Stage 3 GP Beiras e Serra da Estrela, Mario Gonzalez
Overall Tour of China II, Alejandro Marque
2021
Stage 3 Volta a Portugal, Alejandro Marque
