= Rui Sousa =

Portuguese bicycle racer

Personal information
- Full name: Rui Miguel Sousa Barbosa
- Born: July 17, 1976 (age 50) Barroselas, Portugal
- Height: 1.71 m (5 ft 7 in)
- Weight: 59 kg (130 lb)

Cycling career
- Sport: Cycling
- Current team: Retired
- Discipline: Road
- Role: Rider

Professional teams
- 1998–2001: Porta da Ravessa
- 2002–2004: Milaneza–MSS
- 2005–2009: LA Alumínios–Liberty Seguros
- 2010–2013: Barbot–Siper
- 2014–2017: Rádio Popular

Rui Miguel Sousa Barbosa (born July 17, 1976 in Barroselas) is a retired Portuguese professional cyclist.

== Major results ==
2000
3rd Road race, National Road Championships
2001
1st Stage 5 Troféu Joaquim Agostinho
4th Overall Volta ao Algarve
2002
2nd Road race, National Road Championships
2nd Overall Gran Premio Internacional Mitsubishi MR Cortez

1st Stage 2

3rd Overall Volta a Portugal
5th Overall Volta ao Algarve
2003
1st Stage 2 Gran Premio Internacional Mitsubishi MR Cortez
2004
10th Overall Volta a Portugal
10th Overall Tour de Pologne
2005
9th Overall Vuelta Ciclista de Chile
2006
3rd Road race, National Road Championships
6th Overall GP CTT Correios de Portugal
7th Overall Troféu Joaquim Agostinho
10th Overall Volta a Portugal
2008
7th Overall Volta a Portugal

1st Stage 3

2010
1st Road race, National Road Championships
6th Overall Volta a Portugal
2011
3rd Overall Volta a Portugal
2012
3rd Overall Volta a Portugal

1st Mountains classification
1st Stage 4

2013
3rd Overall Volta a Portugal

1st Stage 2

2014
2nd Overall Volta a Portugal

1st Stage 7

2015
5th Overall Volta a Portugal
2016
9th Overall Volta a Portugal
2017
1st Stage 6 Volta a Portugal
1st Mountains classification GP Beiras e Serra da Estrela
