= Bruno Silva (cyclist) =

Portuguese cyclist

Personal information
- Full name: Bruno Duarte Ferreira Silva
- Born: 17 May 1988 (age 38) Valongo, Portugal
- Height: 1.70 m (5 ft 7 in)
- Weight: 59 kg (130 lb)

Cycling career
- Sport: Cycling
- Current team: Tavfer–Ovos Matinados–Mortágua
- Discipline: Road
- Role: Rider
- Rider type: Climber

Amateur teams
- 2003–2006: Silva e Vinha–ADRAP
- 2007: ERA–Mortágua–Siper
- 2008: Casactiva–Quinta das Arcas–Aluvia
- 2009–2010: Aluvia–Valongo

Professional teams
- 2011–2013: LA–Antarte
- 2014: Efapel–Glassdrive
- 2015–2016: LA Alumínios–Antarte
- 2017–2019: Efapel
- 2020: LA Alumínios / LA Sport
- 2021: Antarte–Feirense
- 2022–: Tavfer–Mortágua–Ovos Matinados

Bruno Duarte Ferreira Silva (born 17 May 1988) is a Portuguese cyclist, who currently rides for UCI Continental team Tavfer–Ovos Matinados–Mortágua.

== Major results ==
2006
8th Overall Vuelta al Besaya
2008
1st Overall Volta à Madeira

1st Stage 3

2nd Road race, National Under-23 Road Championships
2009
1st Overall Volta à Madeira

1st Prologue (TTT) & Stages 1, 2 & 4

3rd Overall Volta a Portugal do Futuro
5th Overall Vuelta Ciclista a León
9th Overall Grand Prix du Portugal
2010
1st Stage 3 Volta a Portugal do Futuro
2nd Overall Volta à Madeira

1st Stage 2

5th Overall Troféu Joaquim Agostinho
6th Overall Vuelta Ciclista a León
2011
3rd Overall Vuelta a Tenerife
2013
1st Challenge Cidade de Loulé
4th Road race, National Road Championships
5th Overall Troféu Joaquim Agostinho

1st Mountains classification

2015
1st Mountains classification Volta a Portugal
9th Overall Troféu Joaquim Agostinho
2016
1st Circuito de Nafarros
5th Overall Troféu Joaquim Agostinho
2019
1st Mountains classification Vuelta a Castilla y León
1st Circuito de Nafarros
2021
1st Mountains classification Volta a Portugal
2023
5th Overall GP Douro Internacional
6th Overall Troféu Ribeiro da Silva
10th Overall Grande Prémio Abimota
