= Robert Bush (cyclist) =

American cyclist (born 1990)

Personal information
- Born: March 13, 1990 (age 36) San Jose, California

Cycling career
- Sport: Cycling
- Current team: Retired
- Discipline: Road
- Role: Rider

Professional teams
- 2010: Kenda-Gear Grinder
- 2011-2012: Chipotle-First Solar Development Team
- 2013: La Pomme Marseille (until 2/8)

Robert Bush (born March 13, 1990, in San Jose, California) is an American cyclist.

== Palmares ==
2011
U23 National Criterium Champion
1st stage 5 Tour de Beauce
1st stage Cascade Cycling Classic
2012
U23 National Road Race Champion
