= David Livramento =

Portuguese cyclist

Personal information
- Full name: David da Silva Livramento
- Born: 18 December 1983 (age 42) Faro, Portugal
- Height: 1.82 m (6 ft 0 in)
- Weight: 55 kg (121 lb)

Cycling career
- Sport: Cycling
- Current team: Retired
- Discipline: Road
- Role: Rider
- Rider type: Climber

Professional team
- 2006–2023: Duja–Tavira

David da Silva Livramento (born 18 December 1983) is a Portuguese former professional road bicycle racer, who rode professionally from 2006 to 2023 for UCI Continental team AP Hotels & Resorts–Tavira–SC Farense.

== Major results ==
2012
1st Overall GP Onda-Boavista

1st Stage 1

1st Circuit de Nafarros
2013
5th Road race, National Road Championships
