= Sérgio Ribeiro (cyclist) =

Portuguese cyclist

Personal information
- Full name: Sérgio Miguel Vieira Ribeiro
- Born: 28 November 1980 (age 45) Matosinhos, Portugal

Cycling career
- Sport: Cycling
- Current team: Retired
- Discipline: Road
- Role: Rider

Amateur team
- 2001: Janotas & Simões

Professional teams
- 2002–2004: ASC–Vila do Conde
- 2005–2006: Barbot–Pascoal
- 2007: Benfica
- 2009–2012: Barbot–Siper
- 2013: Louletano–Dunas Douradas

Sérgio Miguel Vieira Ribeiro (born 28 November 1980 in Matosinhos) is a Portuguese former cyclist.

== Major results ==
2005
1st Stage 1 Vuelta a Castilla y León
3rd Overall Volta ao Alentejo

1st Stage 5

2006
1st Overall Volta ao Alentejo

1st Stage 5

1st Stage 1 Volta ao Distrito de Santarém
3rd Overall GP Internacional Paredes Rota dos Móveis

1st Stage 3

2009
1st Overall Tour do Brasil

1st Stages 2 & 3

1st Stage 3 GP Liberty Seguros
2010
1st Stage 5 Vuelta a Castilla y León
1st Stage 1 GP Liberty Seguros
Volta a Portugal

1st Stages 2 & 8

2nd Overall Grande Prémio Crédito Agrícola de la Costa Azul

1st Stage 2

2011
1st Overall GP Liberty Seguros
Volta a Portugal

1st Stages 1 & 2

2nd Overall Troféu Joaquim Agostinho

1st Stage 3

2012
1st Stage 3 GP Liberty Seguros
1st Stage 1 Troféu Joaquim Agostinho
1st Stage 5 Volta a Portugal
2013
1st Stage 1 Troféu Joaquim Agostinho
