= GP Internacional Paredes Rota dos Móveis =

Cycle race in Portugal

Race details
- Date: Mid May
- Region: Portugal
- Local name: GP Internacional Paredes Rota dos Móveis (in Portuguese)
- Discipline: Road
- Competition: UCI Europe Tour
- Type: Stage race

History
- First edition: 2006
- Editions: 4 (as of 2009)
- First winner: (Portugal) Pedro Cardoso
- Most recent: (Portugal) Cândido Barbosa

The GP Internacional Paredes Rota dos Móveis is a road bicycle racing stage race held annually in Portugal. Since 2006, it has been organised as a 2.1 event on the UCI Europe Tour.

== Winners ==
Year	Country	Rider	Team
2003	Spain	Gustavo Domínguez	
2006	Portugal	Pedro Cardoso	Maia Milaneza
2007	Spain	David Blanco	Duja–Tavira
2008	Spain	Constantino Zaballa	LA–MSS
2009	Portugal	Cândido Barbosa	Palmeiras Resort–Tavira
