= GP CTT Correios de Portugal =

Race details
- Date: June–May–April
- Region: Portugal
- Local name(s): GP CTT Correios de Portugal (in Portuguese)
- Discipline: Road
- Competition: UCI Europe Tour
- Type: Stage race

History
- First edition: 2000
- Editions: 10 (as of 2009)
- First winner: Ángel Edo (ESP)
- Most recent: Adrián Palomares (ESP)

The GP CTT Correios de Portugal is a road bicycle racing stage race held annually in Portugal. Since 2005, it has been organised as a 2.1 event on the UCI Europe Tour.

== Winners ==
Year	Country	Rider	Team
2000	Spain	Ángel Edo	Maia-MSS
2001	Spain	Iván Gutiérrez	O.N.C.E.-Eroski
2002	Spain	Ángel Edo	Milaneza-MSS
2003	Portugal	Nuno Marta	Barbot-Torrie
2004	Portugal	Cândido Barbosa	LA-Pecol
2005	Russia	Alexei Markov	Milaneza-Maia
2006	Spain	Jordi Grau	LA Aluminios-Liberty Seguros
2007	Portugal	Pedro Cardoso (cyclist)	LA Aluminios-MSS-Milaneza
2008	Portugal	Nuno Ribeiro	Liberty Seguros
2009	Spain	Adrián Palomares	Conentpolis-AMPO
