= Anicolor / Campicarn =

Portuguese cycling team

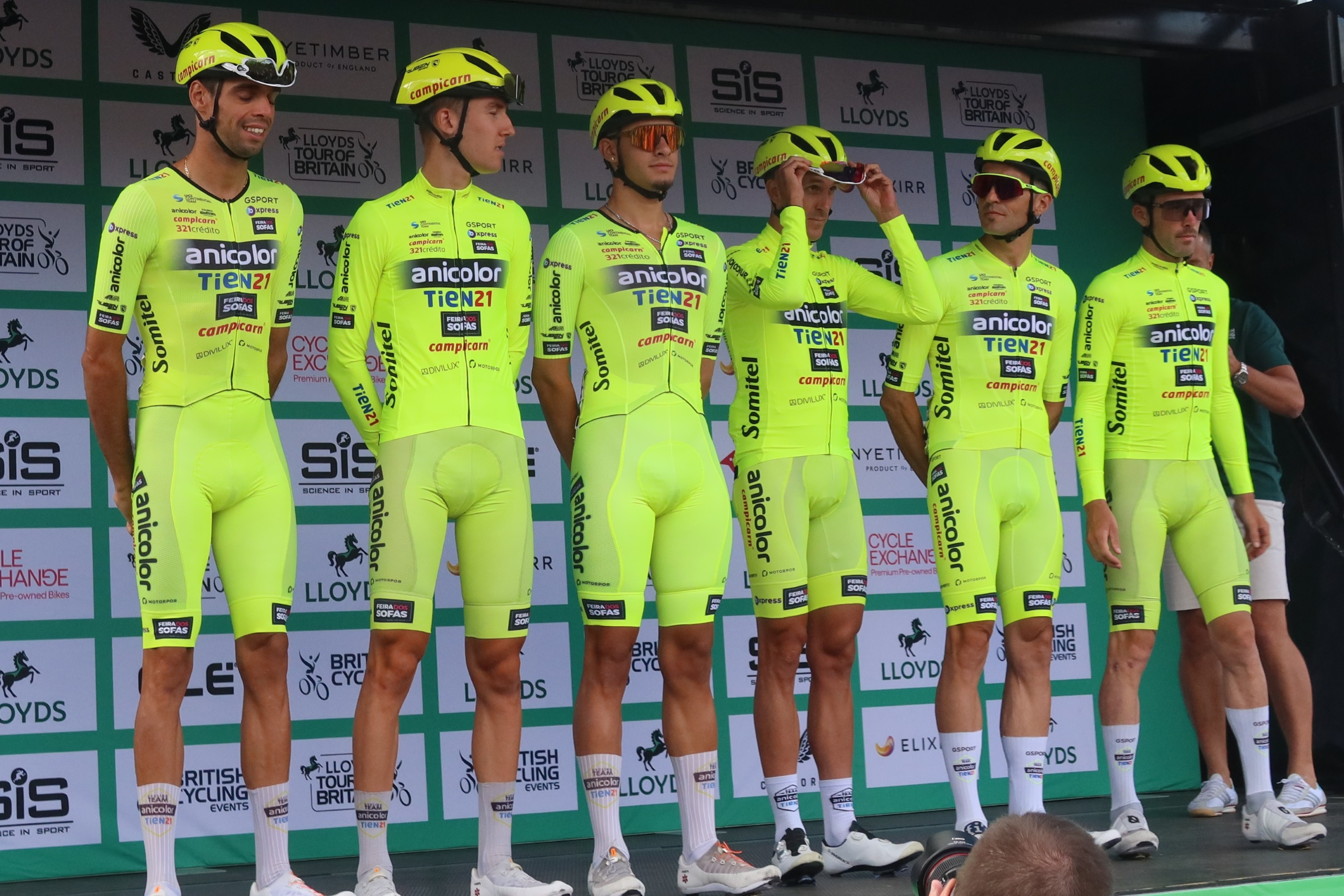
- The team at the 2025 Tour of Britain

Team information
- UCI code: ACR
- Registered: Portugal
- Founded: 2000
- Discipline: Road
- Status: Trade Team III (2000–2001); Trade Team II (2002–2003); Trade Team III (2004); Continental (2005–)
- Bicycles: MCipollini

Key personnel
- General manager: Carlos Pereira
- Team managers: Rúben Pereira; José Silva

Team name history
- 2000–2001 2002–2003 2004 2005 2006–2007 2008–2010 2011 2012–2014 2015–2021 2022–2023 2024 2025 2026–: Barbot–Torrié Cafés–Gondomar (BAR); Barbot–Torrié Cafés (BAR); Barbot–Gaia (BAR); Barbot–Pascoal (BPC); Barbot–Halcon (BHL); Barbot–Siper (BSP); Barbot–Efapel (BEF); Efapel–Glassdrive (EFG); Efapel (EFP); Glassdrive–Q8–Anicolor (GCT); Sabgal–Anicolor (SAT); Anicolor / Tien 21 (ATI); Anicolor / Tien 21 (ACR)
Jersey

Anicolor / Campicarn is a Portuguese UCI Continental status professional cycling team based in Vila Nova de Gaia.

== Team roster ==
As of 8 September 2026.

Rider	Date of birth
Peter Cevini (ITA)	4 August 1991 (age 35)
Rubén Fernández (ESP)	1 March 1991 (age 35)
Louis Ferreira (FRA)	9 August 2000 (age 26)
Alexis Guérin (FRA)	6 June 1992 (age 34)
Enzo Leijnse (NED)	16 July 2001 (age 25)
Andoni Lopez de Abetxuko (ESP)	3 August 1999 (age 27)
Santiago Mesa (COL)	11 November 1997 (age 28)

Rider	Date of birth
Carson Miles (CAN)	2 July 2000 (age 26)
Artem Nych (RUS)	21 March 1995 (age 31)
Gonçalo Oliveira (POR)	4 January 2001 (age 25)
Rafael Reis (POR)	15 July 1992 (age 34)
Tiago Santos (POR)	31 May 2005 (age 21)
Joao Silva (POR)	15 January 2007 (age 19)
Bernardo Teixeira (POR)	11 July 2006 (age 20)

== Major wins ==
2000
Stage 4 GP Torres Vedras, Paulo Ferreira
2001
Stage 7 Volta a Portugal, Santiago Pérez
2002
GP Ciudad de Vigo, Nuño Marta
2003
Overall GP CTT Correios, Nuño Marta

Stage 1, Nuño Marta

2004
Stage 3 Volta ao Algarve, Martin Garrido
2005
Stage 1 Vuelta a Castilla y Léon, Sergio Ribeiro
Stage 5 Volta ao Alentejo, Sergio Ribeiro
Stage 10 Volta a Portugal, Claus Michael Møller
2006
Stage 1 Volta ao Distrito de Santarém, Sergio Ribeiro
Overall Volta ao Alentejo, Sergio Ribeiro

Stage 5, Sergio Ribeiro

2007
Stage 2 Volta a Portugal, Francisco Pacheco
2008

1st Stage 3 & 5 Vuelta a Extremadura, Francisco Pacheco

Stage 1 GP CTT Correios, Francisco Pacheco
Stage 4 & 5 Volta a Portugal, Francisco Pacheco
2009
Overall Volta de São Paulo, Sergio Ribeiro

Stage 2 & 3, Sergio Ribeiro

2010
Stage 5 Vuelta a Castilla y León, Sergio Ribeiro
Stage 2 Volta ao Alentejo, Bruno Pires
Portugal Road Race Championships, Rui Sousa
Stage 1 GP Torres Vedras, Bruno Lima
Stage 2 & 8 Volta a Portugal, Sérgio Ribeiro
Stage 6 Volta a Portugal, Joaquin Ortega
Stage 9 Volta a Portugal, David Bernabeu
2011
Overall GP Costa Azul, Filipe Cardoso

Stage 3, Filipe Cardoso

GP Llodio, Santiago Pérez
Stage 4 Volta ao Alentejo, Filipe Cardoso
Stage 3 GP Torres Vedras, Sergio Ribeiro
Stage 4 GP Torres Vedras, Raúl Alarcón
Stages 1 & 2 Volta a Portugal, Sérgio Ribeiro
2012
Stage 4 Volta ao Alentejo, Filipe Cardoso
Stage 1 Troféu Joaquim Agostinho, Sérgio Ribeiro
Overall Volta a Portugal, David Blanco

Stage 3, César Fonte
Stage 4, Rui Sousa
Stage 5, Sérgio Ribeiro
Stage 8, David Blanco

2013
Portugal Road Race Championships, Joni Brandão
Stage 2 Volta a Portugal, Rui Sousa
2014
Prologue Troféu Joaquim Agostinho, Víctor de la Parte
Prologue Volta a Portugal, Víctor de la Parte
2015
Stage 3 Troféu Joaquim Agostinho, David de la Fuente
Stage 4 Volta a Portugal, Filipe Cardoso
2016
Overall Grande Prémio Internacional Beiras e Serra da Estrela

Stage 3, Joni Brandão

Stages 1 & 9 Volta a Portugal em Bicicleta, Daniel Mestre
2017
Overall GP Internacional Beiras e Serra de Estrela, Jesús del Pino

Sprints classification, Sérgio Paulinho

Stage 3b Troféu Joaquim Agostinho, Daniel Mestre
Stage 7 Volta a Portugal, António Barbio
2018
Clássica Aldeias do Xisto, Daniel Mestre
Teams classification, GP Internacional Beiras e Serra de Estrela (Note: The riders on the squad were Jesús del Pino, Daniel Mestre, Rafael Silva, Sérgio Paulinho, Bruno Silva, Marcos Jurado and Henrique Casimiro)
Points classification Troféu Joaquim Agostinho, Henrique Casimiro

Stage 3, Henrique Casimiro

Sprints classification Vuelta a la Comunidad de Madrid, Marcos Jurado
2019
Stage 3 GP Beiras e Serra da Estrela, Joni Brandão
Overall Troféu Joaquim Agostinho, Henrique Casimiro
2020
Stage 1 Troféu Joaquim Agostinho, Luís Mendonça
Stage 4 Volta a Portugal, Joni Brandão
Stage 7 Volta a Portugal, António Carvalho
2021
Portugal U23 Time Trial Championships, Fábio Fernandes
Overall Volta ao Alentejo, Mauricio Moreira

Stage 5 (ITT), Mauricio Moreira

Overall Troféu Joaquim Agostinho, Frederico Figueiredo
Prologue, Stages 1, 7 & 10 (ITT) Volta a Portugal, Rafael Reis
Stage 4 Volta a Portugal, Frederico Figueiredo
Stage 9 Volta a Portugal, Mauricio Moreira
2022
Portugal Time Trial Championships, Rafael Reis
Portugal U23 Road Race Championships, Afonso Eulálio
Overall Troféu Joaquim Agostinho, Frederico Figueiredo

Stage 3, Frederico Figueiredo

Overall Volta a Portugal, Mauricio Moreira

Prologue, Rafael Reis
Stages 3 & 10 (ITT), Mauricio Moreira
Stage 5, Frederico Figueiredo
Stage 9, Antonio Carvalho
