= Credibom–LA Alumínios–Marcos Car =

Portuguese cycling team

Team information
- UCI code: LAA
- Registered: Portugal
- Founded: 1995
- Discipline: Road
- Status: 1999–2002: TT3; 2003: TT2; 2004: TT3; 2005–: UCI Continental team

Key personnel
- General manager: Luís Almeida
- Team managers: Hernâni Brôco; José Nicolau

Team name history
- 1995–1996 1997 1998–1999 2000–2001 2002 2003–2004 2005–2006 2007–2008 2009–2010 2011–2012 2013–2016 2017 2018–2019 2020–2021 2022 2023–: W52–Paredes Móvel; Paredes Móvel–W52; Paredes Móvel–Ecop; Paredes Rota dos Móveis–Tintas VIP; Paredes Rota dos Móveis–Antarte VIP; Antarte–Rota dos Móveis; Paredes Rota dos Móveis–Beira Tâmega; Fercase–Rota dos Móveis; LA Alumínios–Rota dos Móveis; LA–Antarte; LA Alumínios–Antarte; LA Alumínios–Metalusa; LA Alumínios; LA Alumínios–LA Sport; LA Alumínios–Credibom–Marcos Car; Credibom–LA Alumínios–Marcos Car

Credibom–LA Alumínios–Marcos Car is a Portuguese UCI Continental cycling team based in Seixal. It participates in the UCI Continental Circuits.

== Team roster ==
As of 15 February 2021.

Rider	Date of birth
Rodrigo Caixas (POR)	6 November 2000 (age 25)
Rafael Gouveia (POR)	20 September 2001 (age 24)
Gonçalo Leaça (POR)	29 October 1997 (age 28)
João Macedo (POR)	27 September 2001 (age 24)
João Medeiros (POR)	4 August 2000 (age 26)

Rider	Date of birth
Sérgio Paulinho (POR)	26 March 1980 (age 46)
André Ramalho (POR)	11 March 1996 (age 30)
Carlos Salgueiro (POR)	9 June 1999 (age 27)
Marcelo Salvador (POR)	11 March 1997 (age 29)
Marvin Scheulen (POR)	25 February 1997 (age 29)

== Major wins ==
2000
Stage 1 Volta a Portugal, Miguel Ángel Suárez
2003
Stage 2 Volta a Portugal, Alberto Benito
Stage 2 GP CTT Correios, Alberto Benito
2004
Stage 1 Volta ao Algarve, Alberto Benito
Stage 1 Volta ao Alentejo, Alberto Benito
Stage 4 GP Torres Vedras, Alberto Benito
2005
Overall Volta ao Algarve, Hugo Sabido

Stage 5, Hugo Sabido

Overall GP Torres Vedras, Gerardo Fernández

Stage 2, Gerardo Fernández

GP Area Metropolitana de Vigo, Francisco García Rodríguez
GP Ciudad de Vigo, José Carlos Rodrigues
2008
Stage 3 Circuit de Lorraine, Eladio Jiménez
Stage 2 GP CTT Correios, Eladio Jiménez
Overall Vuelta a Chihuahua, Francisco Mancebo
Stage 8 Tour of South China Sea, Micael Isidoro
2009
Stages 1 & 8 Volta de São Paulo, Héctor Aguilar
2010
Stage 3 GP Torres Vedras, José João Mendes
2011
Stage 2 Volta ao Alentejo, Bruno Sancho
Prologue Volta a Portugal, Hugo Sabido
Stage 3 Volta a Portugal, Hernâni Brôco
2013
Stage 5 Volta ao Alentejo, António Carvalho
2014
Mountain classification Volta a Portugal, António Carvalho

Stage 4, Edgar Pinto

Stage 1 GP Torres Vedras, Edgar Pinto
2015
Mountain classification Volta a Portugal, Bruno Silva
