= 2015 Vuelta a Castilla y León =

2015 UCI Europe Tour

Race details
- Dates: 17–19 April 2015
- Stages: 3
- Distance: 515.6 km (320.4 mi)
- Winning time: 13h 18' 36"

Results
Jersey awarded to the overall winner	Winner	Pierre Rolland (FRA)	(Team Europcar)
	Second	Beñat Intxausti (ESP)	(Movistar Team)
	Third	Igor Antón (ESP)	(Movistar Team)
Jersey awarded to the points classification winner	Points	Pello Bilbao (ESP)	(Caja Rural–Seguros RGA)
Jersey awarded to the mountains classification winner	Mountains	Garikoitz Bravo (ESP)	(Murias Taldea)
Jersey awarded to the combination classification winner	Combination	Pierre Rolland (FRA)	(Team Europcar)
	Team	Movistar Team	

The 2015 Vuelta a Castilla y León was the 30th edition of the Vuelta a Castilla y León cycling stage race. It started on 17 April in Ávila and ended on 19 April on the climb of Alto de Lubián, after three stages. The race was part of the 2015 UCI Europe Tour, and was rated as a 2.1 event. The defending champion was David Belda (Burgos BH).

The race was won by Pierre Rolland (Team Europcar), who won a solo victory on the summit finish on the final stage. The Movistar Team riders Beñat Intxausti and Igor Antón were second and third.

== Teams ==
17 teams were invited to take part in the race. One of these (Movistar Team) was a UCI WorldTeam; three were UCI Professional Continental teams; twelve were UCI Continental teams. The final team was a Spanish national team of track cyclists.

UCI WorldTeams

- Movistar Team

UCI Professional Continental teams

- Caja Rural–Seguros RGA
- Team Europcar
- Colombia

UCI Continental teams

- Burgos BH
- Murias Taldea
- Inteja–MMR Dominican Cycling Team
- Cyclingteam de Rijke
- Rádio Popular–Boavista
- Efapel
- Tavira
- W52–Quinta da Lixa
- MG.K Vis–Vega
- Skydive Dubai–Al Ahli
- Rad-Net Rose Team
- Lokosphinx

National teams

- Spain

== Schedule ==
Stage	Date	Route	Distance	Type	Winner
1	17 April	Ávila to Alba de Tormes	147.4 km (91.6 mi)	Intermediate stage	Pello Bilbao (ESP)
2	18 April	Guarda (Portugal) to Fuentes de Oñoro	189 km (117.4 mi)	Intermediate stage	Sergey Shilov (RUS)
3	19 April	Zamora to Alto de Lubián	179.2 km (111.3 mi)	Mountain stage	Pierre Rolland (FRA)
Total		515.6 km (320.4 mi)			

== Stages ==
=== Stage 1 ===
17 April 2015 – Ávila to Alba de Tormes, 147.4 km (91.6 mi)

Stage 1 result
Rank	Rider	Team	Time
1	Pello Bilbao (ESP)	Caja Rural–Seguros RGA	3h 35' 19"
2	Enrique Sanz (ESP)	Movistar Team	+ 0"
3	Carlos Barbero (ESP)	Caja Rural–Seguros RGA	+ 0"
4	Angelo Tulik (FRA)	Team Europcar	+ 0"
5	Andrea Palini (ITA)	Skydive Dubai–Al Ahli	+ 0"
6	Jetse Bol (NED)	Cyclingteam de Rijke	+ 0"
7	Kirill Sveshnikov (RUS)	Lokosphinx	+ 0"
8	Javier Moreno (ESP)	Movistar Team	+ 0"
9	Edwin Ávila (COL)	Colombia	+ 0"
10	Edgar Pinto (POR)	Skydive Dubai–Al Ahli	+ 0"

General classification after stage 1
Rank	Rider	Team	Time
1	Pello Bilbao (ESP)	Caja Rural–Seguros RGA	3h 35' 09"
2	Enrique Sanz (ESP)	Movistar Team	+ 4"
3	Carlos Barbero (ESP)	Caja Rural–Seguros RGA	+ 6"
4	Angelo Tulik (FRA)	Team Europcar	+ 10"
5	Andrea Palini (ITA)	Skydive Dubai–Al Ahli	+ 10"
6	Jetse Bol (NED)	Cyclingteam de Rijke	+ 10"
7	Kirill Sveshnikov (RUS)	Lokosphinx	+ 10"
8	Javier Moreno (ESP)	Movistar Team	+ 10"
9	Edwin Ávila (COL)	Colombia	+ 10"
10	Edgar Pinto (POR)	Skydive Dubai–Al Ahli	+ 10"

=== Stage 2 ===
18 April 2015 – Guarda (Portugal) to Fuentes de Oñoro, 189 km (117 mi)

Stage 2 result
Rank	Rider	Team	Time
1	Sergey Shilov (RUS)	Lokosphinx	5h 04' 52"
2	Carlos Barbero (ESP)	Caja Rural–Seguros RGA	+ 0"
3	Miguel Ángel Rubiano (COL)	Colombia	+ 0"
4	Angelo Tulik (FRA)	Team Europcar	+ 0"
5	Edgar Pinto (POR)	Skydive Dubai–Al Ahli	+ 0"
6	Jetse Bol (NED)	Cyclingteam de Rijke	+ 0"
7	Pello Bilbao (ESP)	Caja Rural–Seguros RGA	+ 0"
8	Jonathan Castroviejo (ESP)	Movistar Team	+ 0"
9	Samuel Caldeira (POR)	W52–Quinta da Lixa	+ 0"
10	Diego Milán (DOM)	Inteja–MMR Dominican Cycling Team	+ 0"

General classification after stage 2
Rank	Rider	Team	Time
1	Carlos Barbero (ESP)	Caja Rural–Seguros RGA	8h 40' 01"
2	Pello Bilbao (ESP)	Caja Rural–Seguros RGA	+ 0"
3	Miguel Ángel Rubiano (COL)	Colombia	+ 6"
4	Angelo Tulik (FRA)	Team Europcar	+ 10"
5	Jetse Bol (NED)	Cyclingteam de Rijke	+ 10"
6	Edgar Pinto (POR)	Skydive Dubai–Al Ahli	+ 10"
7	Javier Moreno (ESP)	Movistar Team	+ 10"
8	Delio Fernández (ESP)	W52–Quinta da Lixa	+ 10"
9	Adrián González (ESP)	Murias Taldea	+ 10"
10	Samuel Caldeira (POR)	W52–Quinta da Lixa	+ 10"

=== Stage 3 ===
19 April 2015 – Zamora to Alto de Lubián, 179.2 km (111.3 mi)

Stage 3 result
Rank	Rider	Team	Time
1	Pierre Rolland (FRA)	Team Europcar	4h 38' 35"
2	Beñat Intxausti (ESP)	Movistar Team	+ 12"
3	Igor Antón (ESP)	Movistar Team	+ 18"
4	Rodolfo Torres (COL)	Colombia	+ 20"
5	Maxime Méderel (FRA)	Team Europcar	+ 43"
6	Evgeny Shalunov (RUS)	Lokosphinx	+ 47"
7	Delio Fernández (ESP)	W52–Quinta da Lixa	+ 47"
8	Pello Bilbao (ESP)	Caja Rural–Seguros RGA	+ 47"
9	Romain Sicard (FRA)	Team Europcar	+ 47"
10	David Belda (ESP)	Burgos BH	+ 54"

Final general classification
Rank	Rider	Team	Time
1	Pierre Rolland (FRA)	Team Europcar	13h 18' 36"
2	Beñat Intxausti (ESP)	Movistar Team	+ 16"
3	Igor Antón (ESP)	Movistar Team	+ 24"
4	Pello Bilbao (ESP)	Caja Rural–Seguros RGA	+ 47"
5	Delio Fernández (ESP)	W52–Quinta da Lixa	+ 57"
6	Romain Sicard (FRA)	Team Europcar	+ 57"
7	Javier Moreno (ESP)	Movistar Team	+ 1' 07"
8	Rodolfo Torres (COL)	Colombia	+ 1' 27"
9	Alejandro Marque (ESP)	Efapel	+ 1' 39"
10	Francisco Mancebo (ESP)	Skydive Dubai–Al Ahli	+ 1' 49"

== Classification leadership table ==
Stage	Winner	General classification	Mountains classification	Points classification	Combination classification	Teams classification
1	Pello Bilbao	Pello Bilbao	José Gonçalves	Pello Bilbao	Pello Bilbao	Caja Rural–Seguros RGA
2	Sergey Shilov	Carlos Barbero	José Gonçalves	Carlos Barbero	Carlos Barbero	Team Europcar
3	Pierre Rolland	Pierre Rolland	Garikoitz Bravo	Pello Bilbao	Pierre Rolland	Movistar Team
Final		Pierre Rolland	Garikoitz Bravo	Pello Bilbao	Pierre Rolland	Movistar Team
