= 2014 Volta a Portugal =

2014 UCI Europe Tour

Race details
- Dates: July 30 - August 10
- Stages: 10 + Prologue
- Distance: 1,613.4 km (1,003 mi)
- Winning time: 42h 40' 23"

Results
Jersey awarded to the overall winner	Winner	Gustavo César (Spain)	(OFM–Quinta da Lixa)
	Second	Rui Sousa (Portugal)	(Rádio Popular)
	Third	Délio Fernandez (Spain)	(OFM–Quinta da Lixa)
Jersey awarded to the points classification winner	Points	Davide Viganò (Italy)	(Caja Rural–Seguros RGA)
Jersey awarded to the mountains classification winner	Mountains	António Carvalho (Portugal)	(LA Alumínios–Antarte)
Jersey awarded to the youth classification winner	Youth	David Rodrigues (Portugal)	(Portugal (national team))
	Team	(Portugal) OFM–Quinta da Lixa	

The 2014 Volta a Portugal was a men's road bicycle race held from 30 July to 10 August 2014. It was the 76th edition of the men's stage race to be held, which was established in 1927. As part of the 2014 UCI Europe Tour, it is rated as a 2.1 event.

The Spanish cyclist Gustavo César from OFM–Quinta da Lixa won the race.

== Participating teams ==
In total, 16 teams competed.

- National teams:
  - Banco BIC–Carmim
  - Efapel–Glassdrive
  - LA Alumínios–Antarte
  - Louletano–Dunas Douradas
  - OFM–Quinta da Lixa
  - Rádio Popular
  - Portugal (national team)
- International teams:
  - Caja Rural–Seguros RGA
  - Burgos BH
  - Team Stölting
  - Team Stuttgart
  - Team Ukyo
  - Christina Watches–Dana
  - Lokosphinx
  - Team Ecuador
  - 4-72 Colombia

== Schedule ==
Stage characteristics and winners
Stage	Date	Course	Distance	Type	Winner
P	30 July	Fafe to Fafe	6.8 km (4 mi)	Individual time trial	Víctor de la Parte (ESP)
1	31 July	Lousada to Maia	183.5 km (114 mi)	Flat stage	Phil Bauhaus (GER)
2	1 August	Gondomar to Braga	171.8 km (107 mi)	Medium-mountain stage	Davide Viganò (ITA)
3	2 August	Viana do Castelo to Montalegre–Serra do Larouco	180.8 km (112 mi)	Medium-mountain stage	David Belda (ESP)
4	3 August	Boticas to Mondim de Basto–Senhora da Graça	192.5 km (120 mi)	Mountain stage	Edgar Pinto (POR)
5	4 August	Alvarenga to Santo Tirso–Alto da Nossa Senhora da Assunção	161.3 km (100 mi)	Medium-mountain stage	David Belda (ESP)
6	5 August	Oliveira do Bairro to Viseu	155 km (96 mi)	Flat stage	Phil Bauhaus (GER)
	6 August			Rest day	
7	7 August	Belmonte to Seia–Alto da Torre	172.5 km (107 mi)	Mountain stage	Rui Sousa (POR)
8	8 August	Sabugal to Castelo Branco	194 km (121 mi)	Flat stage	Sergey Shilov (RUS)
9	9 August	Oleiros to Sertã	28.9 km (18 mi)	Individual time trial	Gustavo César (ESP)
10	10 August	Burinhosa to Lisbon	167.1 km (104 mi)	Flat stage	Manuel Cardoso (POR)

== Stages ==
=== Prologue ===
30 July 2014 — Fafe to Fafe, 6.8 km (4 mi), individual time trial (ITT)

Prologue result and General classification after Prologue
Rank	Rider	Team	Time
1	Víctor de la Parte (ESP)	Efapel–Glassdrive	8' 56"
2	Gustavo César (ESP)	OFM–Quinta da Lixa	+ 4"
3	Luis León Sánchez (ESP)	Caja Rural–Seguros RGA	+ 10"
4	Sergey Shilov (RUS)	Lokosphinx	+ 14"
5	Edgar Pinto (POR)	LA Alumínios–Antarte	+ 15"
6	Stefan Schumacher (GER)	Christina Watches–Dana	+ 15"
7	Sérgio Sousa (POR)	Efapel–Glassdrive	+ 17"
8	José Vicente Toribio (ESP)	Team Ukyo	+ 19"
9	Delio Fernández (ESP)	OFM–Quinta da Lixa	+ 20"
10	Rubén Fernández (ESP)	Caja Rural–Seguros RGA	+ 21"

=== Stage 1 ===
31 July 2014 — Lousada to Maia, 183.5 km (114 mi)

Stage 1 result
Rank	Rider	Team	Time
1	Phil Bauhaus (GER)	Team Stölting	4h 51' 10"
2	Manuel Cardoso (POR)	Banco BIC–Carmim	+ 0"
3	Davide Viganò (ITA)	Caja Rural–Seguros RGA	+ 0"
4	Filipe Cardoso (POR)	Efapel–Glassdrive	+ 0"
5	Sergey Shilov (RUS)	Lokosphinx	+ 0"
6	Yukihiro Doi (JPN)	Team Ukyo	+ 0"
7	Asbjørn Kragh Andersen (DNK)	Christina Watches–Dana	+ 0"
8	Samuel Caldeira (POR)	OFM–Quinta da Lixa	+ 0"
9	Francesco Lasca (ITA)	Caja Rural–Seguros RGA	+ 0"
10	César Fonte (POR)	Rádio Popular	+ 0"

General classification after stage 1
Rank	Rider	Team	Time
1	Víctor de la Parte (ESP)	Efapel–Glassdrive	5h 00' 06"
2	Gustavo César (ESP)	OFM–Quinta da Lixa	+ 4"
3	Luis León Sánchez (ESP)	Caja Rural–Seguros RGA	+ 10"
4	Sergey Shilov (RUS)	Lokosphinx	+ 14"
5	Edgar Pinto (POR)	LA Alumínios–Antarte	+ 15"
6	Stefan Schumacher (GER)	Christina Watches–Dana	+ 15"
7	Sérgio Sousa (POR)	Efapel–Glassdrive	+ 17"
8	José Vicente Toribio (ESP)	Team Ukyo	+ 19"
9	Delio Fernández (ESP)	OFM–Quinta da Lixa	+ 20"
10	Rubén Fernández (ESP)	Caja Rural–Seguros RGA	+ 21"

=== Stage 2 ===
1 August 2014 — Gondomar to Braga, 171.8 km (107 mi)

Stage 2 result
Rank	Rider	Team	Time
1	Davide Viganò (ITA)	Caja Rural–Seguros RGA	4h 20' 58"
2	Manuel Cardoso (POR)	Banco BIC–Carmim	+ 0"
3	Hugo Sabido (POR)	LA Alumínios–Antarte	+ 0"
4	Daniel Mestre (POR)	Banco BIC–Carmim	+ 0"
5	Jordi Simón (ESP)	Team Ecuador	+ 0"
6	César Fonte (POR)	Rádio Popular	+ 0"
7	Delio Fernández (ESP)	OFM–Quinta da Lixa	+ 0"
8	Arkaitz Durán (ESP)	OFM–Quinta da Lixa	+ 0"
9	Micael Isidoro (POR)	Louletano–Dunas Douradas	+ 0"
10	Ricardo Mestre (POR)	Efapel–Glassdrive	+ 0"

General classification after stage 2
Rank	Rider	Team	Time
1	Víctor de la Parte (ESP)	Efapel–Glassdrive	9h 21' 04"
2	Gustavo César (ESP)	OFM–Quinta da Lixa	+ 4"
3	Luis León Sánchez (ESP)	Caja Rural–Seguros RGA	+ 10"
4	Edgar Pinto (POR)	LA Alumínios–Antarte	+ 15"
5	Sérgio Sousa (POR)	Efapel–Glassdrive	+ 17"
6	Delio Fernández (ESP)	OFM–Quinta da Lixa	+ 20"
7	Rubén Fernández (ESP)	Caja Rural–Seguros RGA	+ 21"
8	Ricardo Vilela (POR)	OFM–Quinta da Lixa	+ 22"
9	Joni Brandão (POR)	Efapel–Glassdrive	+ 24"
10	Daniel Eduardo Silva (POR)	Rádio Popular	+ 28"

=== Stage 3 ===
2 August 2014 — Viana do Castelo to Montalegre–Serra do Larouco, 180.8 km (112 mi)

Stage 3 result
Rank	Rider	Team	Time
1	David Belda (ESP)	Burgos BH	5h 09' 03"
2	Ricardo Mestre (POR)	Efapel–Glassdrive	+ 12"
3	Gustavo César (ESP)	OFM–Quinta da Lixa	+ 12"
4	Omar Fraile (ESP)	Caja Rural–Seguros RGA	+ 25"
5	Edgar Pinto (POR)	LA Alumínios–Antarte	+ 27"
6	Delio Fernández (ESP)	OFM–Quinta da Lixa	+ 27"
7	Arkaitz Durán (ESP)	OFM–Quinta da Lixa	+ 27"
8	Higinio Fernández (ESP)	Team Ecuador	+ 27"
9	Sérgio Sousa (POR)	Efapel–Glassdrive	+ 27"
10	Joni Brandão (POR)	Efapel–Glassdrive	+ 27"

General classification after stage 3
Rank	Rider	Team	Time
1	Gustavo César (ESP)	OFM–Quinta da Lixa	14h 30' 23"
2	Víctor de la Parte (ESP)	Efapel–Glassdrive	+ 11"
3	Luis León Sánchez (ESP)	Caja Rural–Seguros RGA	+ 21"
4	Edgar Pinto (POR)	LA Alumínios–Antarte	+ 26"
5	Ricardo Mestre (POR)	Efapel–Glassdrive	+ 27"
6	Sérgio Sousa (POR)	Efapel–Glassdrive	+ 28"
7	Delio Fernández (ESP)	OFM–Quinta da Lixa	+ 31"
8	Rubén Fernández (ESP)	Caja Rural–Seguros RGA	+ 32"
9	Ricardo Vilela (POR)	OFM–Quinta da Lixa	+ 33"
10	Joni Brandão (POR)	Efapel–Glassdrive	+ 35"

=== Stage 4 ===
3 August 2014 — Boticas to Mondim de Basto–Senhora da Graça, 192.5 km (120 mi)

Stage 4 result
Rank	Rider	Team	Time
1	Edgar Pinto (POR)	LA Alumínios–Antarte	5h 18' 08"
2	Gustavo César (ESP)	OFM–Quinta da Lixa	+ 0"
3	Joni Brandão (POR)	Efapel–Glassdrive	+ 8"
4	Delio Fernández (ESP)	OFM–Quinta da Lixa	+ 8"
5	Luis León Sánchez (ESP)	Caja Rural–Seguros RGA	+ 8"
6	Ricardo Mestre (POR)	Efapel–Glassdrive	+ 10"
7	Rubén Fernández (ESP)	Caja Rural–Seguros RGA	+ 14"
8	Jordi Simón (ESP)	Team Ecuador	+ 16"
9	David Belda (ESP)	Burgos BH	+ 16"
10	Rui Sousa (POR)	Rádio Popular	+ 16"

General classification after stage 4
Rank	Rider	Team	Time
1	Gustavo César (ESP)	OFM–Quinta da Lixa	19h 48' 31"
2	Edgar Pinto (POR)	LA Alumínios–Antarte	+ 26"
3	Luis León Sánchez (ESP)	Caja Rural–Seguros RGA	+ 29"
4	Ricardo Mestre (POR)	Efapel–Glassdrive	+ 37"
5	Delio Fernández (ESP)	OFM–Quinta da Lixa	+ 39"
6	Joni Brandão (POR)	Efapel–Glassdrive	+ 43"
7	Rubén Fernández (ESP)	Caja Rural–Seguros RGA	+ 46"
8	David Belda (ESP)	Burgos BH	+ 53"
9	Hernâni Brôco (POR)	Louletano–Dunas Douradas	+ 1' 00"
10	Rui Sousa (POR)	Rádio Popular	+ 1' 01"

=== Stage 5 ===
4 August 2014 — Alvarenga to Santo Tirso–Alto da Nossa Senhora da Assunção, 161.3 km (100 mi)

Stage 5 result
Rank	Rider	Team	Time
1	David Belda (ESP)	Burgos BH	4h 09' 21"
2	Delio Fernández (ESP)	OFM–Quinta da Lixa	+ 3"
3	Gustavo César (ESP)	OFM–Quinta da Lixa	+ 3"
4	Joni Brandão (POR)	Efapel–Glassdrive	+ 3"
5	Luis León Sánchez (ESP)	Caja Rural–Seguros RGA	+ 3"
6	Ricardo Mestre (POR)	Efapel–Glassdrive	+ 7"
7	Edgar Pinto (POR)	LA Alumínios–Antarte	+ 7"
8	Rui Sousa (POR)	Rádio Popular	+ 9"
9	Omar Fraile (ESP)	Caja Rural–Seguros RGA	+ 9"
10	Rubén Fernández (ESP)	Caja Rural–Seguros RGA	+ 9"

General classification after stage 5
Rank	Rider	Team	Time
1	Gustavo César (ESP)	OFM–Quinta da Lixa	23h 57' 55"
2	Luis León Sánchez (ESP)	Caja Rural–Seguros RGA	+ 29"
3	Edgar Pinto (POR)	LA Alumínios–Antarte	+ 30"
4	Delio Fernández (ESP)	OFM–Quinta da Lixa	+ 39"
5	Ricardo Mestre (POR)	Efapel–Glassdrive	+ 41"
6	Joni Brandão (POR)	Efapel–Glassdrive	+ 43"
7	David Belda (ESP)	Burgos BH	+ 50"
8	Rubén Fernández (ESP)	Caja Rural–Seguros RGA	+ 52"
9	Rui Sousa (POR)	Rádio Popular	+ 1' 07"
10	Hernâni Brôco (POR)	Louletano–Dunas Douradas	+ 1' 11"

=== Stage 6 ===
5 August 2014 — Oliveira do Bairro to Viseu, 155 km (96 mi)

Stage 6 result
Rank	Rider	Team	Time
1	Phil Bauhaus (GER)	Team Stölting	4h 03' 05"
2	Davide Viganò (ITA)	Caja Rural–Seguros RGA	+ 0"
3	Vicente García de Mateos (ESP)	Louletano–Dunas Douradas	+ 0"
4	Asbjørn Kragh Andersen (DNK)	Christina Watches–Dana	+ 0"
5	Alexander Krieger (GER)	Team Stuttgart	+ 0"
6	Samuel Caldeira (POR)	OFM–Quinta da Lixa	+ 0"
7	Filipe Cardoso (POR)	Efapel–Glassdrive	+ 0"
8	Francesco Lasca (ITA)	Caja Rural–Seguros RGA	+ 0"
9	Jorge Martín Montenegro (ARG)	Louletano–Dunas Douradas	+ 0"
10	Delio Fernández (ESP)	OFM–Quinta da Lixa	+ 0"

General classification after stage 6
Rank	Rider	Team	Time
1	Gustavo César (ESP)	OFM–Quinta da Lixa	28h 01' 00"
2	Luis León Sánchez (ESP)	Caja Rural–Seguros RGA	+ 29"
3	Edgar Pinto (POR)	LA Alumínios–Antarte	+ 30"
4	Delio Fernández (ESP)	OFM–Quinta da Lixa	+ 39"
5	Ricardo Mestre (POR)	Efapel–Glassdrive	+ 41"
6	Joni Brandão (POR)	Efapel–Glassdrive	+ 43"
7	David Belda (ESP)	Burgos BH	+ 50"
8	Rubén Fernández (ESP)	Caja Rural–Seguros RGA	+ 52"
9	Rui Sousa (POR)	Rádio Popular	+ 1' 07"
10	Hernâni Brôco (POR)	Louletano–Dunas Douradas	+ 1' 11"

=== Stage 7 ===
7 August 2014 — Belmonte to Seia–Alto da Torre, 172.5 km (107 mi)

Stage 7 result
Rank	Rider	Team	Time
1	Rui Sousa (POR)	Rádio Popular	5h 06' 39"
2	Joni Brandão (POR)	Efapel–Glassdrive	+ 39"
3	Edgar Pinto (POR)	LA Alumínios–Antarte	+ 39"
4	Gustavo César (ESP)	OFM–Quinta da Lixa	+ 39"
5	Sandro Pinto (POR)	Louletano–Dunas Douradas	+ 47"
6	Virgilio Santos (POR)	Rádio Popular	+ 51"
7	Delio Fernández (ESP)	OFM–Quinta da Lixa	+ 1' 03"
8	Ricardo Vilela (POR)	OFM–Quinta da Lixa	+ 2' 01"
9	Ricardo Mestre (POR)	Efapel–Glassdrive	+ 2' 17"
10	Víctor de la Parte (ESP)	Efapel–Glassdrive	+ 2' 17"

General classification after stage 7
Rank	Rider	Team	Time
1	Gustavo César (ESP)	OFM–Quinta da Lixa	33h 08' 18"
2	Rui Sousa (POR)	Rádio Popular	+ 28"
3	Edgar Pinto (POR)	LA Alumínios–Antarte	+ 30"
4	Joni Brandão (POR)	Efapel–Glassdrive	+ 43"
5	Delio Fernández (ESP)	OFM–Quinta da Lixa	+ 1' 03"
6	Ricardo Mestre (POR)	Efapel–Glassdrive	+ 2' 19"
7	Sandro Pinto (POR)	Louletano–Dunas Douradas	+ 2' 43"
8	Ricardo Vilela (POR)	OFM–Quinta da Lixa	+ 2' 54"
9	Virgilio Santos (POR)	Rádio Popular	+ 3' 44"
10	Víctor de la Parte (ESP)	Efapel–Glassdrive	+ 4' 36"

=== Stage 8 ===
8 August 2014 — Sabugal to Castelo Branco, 194 km (121 mi)

Stage 8 result
Rank	Rider	Team	Time
1	Sergey Shilov (RUS)	Lokosphinx	4h 48' 21"
2	Samuel Caldeira (POR)	OFM–Quinta da Lixa	+ 0"
3	Manuel Cardoso (POR)	Banco BIC–Carmim	+ 0"
4	Filipe Cardoso (POR)	Efapel–Glassdrive	+ 0"
5	Davide Viganò (ITA)	Caja Rural–Seguros RGA	+ 0"
6	Maximilian Werda (GER)	Team Stölting	+ 0"
7	Jorge Martín Montenegro (ARG)	Louletano–Dunas Douradas	+ 0"
8	Delio Fernández (ESP)	OFM–Quinta da Lixa	+ 0"
9	Daniel Freitas (POR)	LA Alumínios–Antarte	+ 0"
10	Edson Calderón (COL)	4-72 Colombia	+ 0"

General classification after stage 8
Rank	Rider	Team	Time
1	Gustavo César (ESP)	OFM–Quinta da Lixa	37h 56' 39"
2	Rui Sousa (POR)	Rádio Popular	+ 28"
3	Edgar Pinto (POR)	LA Alumínios–Antarte	+ 30"
4	Joni Brandão (POR)	Efapel–Glassdrive	+ 43"
5	Delio Fernández (ESP)	OFM–Quinta da Lixa	+ 1' 03"
6	Ricardo Mestre (POR)	Efapel–Glassdrive	+ 2' 19"
7	Sandro Pinto (POR)	Louletano–Dunas Douradas	+ 2' 52"
8	Ricardo Vilela (POR)	OFM–Quinta da Lixa	+ 2' 54"
9	Virgilio Santos (POR)	Rádio Popular	+ 3' 44"
10	Víctor de la Parte (ESP)	Efapel–Glassdrive	+ 4' 36"

=== Stage 9 ===
9 August 2014 — Oleiros to Sertã, 28.9 km (18 mi), individual time trial (ITT)

Stage 9 result
Rank	Rider	Team	Time
1	Gustavo César (ESP)	OFM–Quinta da Lixa	35' 07"
2	Víctor de la Parte (ESP)	Efapel–Glassdrive	+ 55"
3	Stefan Schumacher (GER)	Christina Watches–Dana	+ 1' 18"
4	Luis León Sánchez (ESP)	Caja Rural–Seguros RGA	+ 1' 23"
5	Rui Sousa (POR)	Rádio Popular	+ 1' 33"
6	Ricardo Vilela (POR)	OFM–Quinta da Lixa	+ 1' 37"
7	Amaro Antunes (POR)	Banco BIC–Carmim	+ 1' 48"
8	Sergey Shilov (RUS)	Lokosphinx	+ 1' 48"
9	Delio Fernández (ESP)	OFM–Quinta da Lixa	+ 1' 51"
10	Hugo Sabido (POR)	LA Alumínios–Antarte	+ 2' 00"

General classification after stage 9
Rank	Rider	Team	Time
1	Gustavo César (ESP)	OFM–Quinta da Lixa	38h 31' 46"
2	Rui Sousa (POR)	Rádio Popular	+ 2' 01"
3	Delio Fernández (ESP)	OFM–Quinta da Lixa	+ 2' 54"
4	Joni Brandão (POR)	Efapel–Glassdrive	+ 3' 10"
5	Edgar Pinto (POR)	LA Alumínios–Antarte	+ 3' 26"
6	Ricardo Vilela (POR)	OFM–Quinta da Lixa	+ 4' 31"
7	Víctor de la Parte (ESP)	Efapel–Glassdrive	+ 5' 31"
8	Sandro Pinto (POR)	Louletano–Dunas Douradas	+ 6' 51"
9	Virgilio Santos (POR)	Rádio Popular	+ 6' 58"
10	Amaro Antunes (POR)	Banco BIC–Carmim	+ 7' 20"

=== Stage 10 ===
10 August 2014 — Burinhosa to Lisbon, 167.1 km (104 mi)

Stage 10 result
Rank	Rider	Team	Time
1	Manuel Cardoso (POR)	Banco BIC–Carmim	4h 08' 21"
2	Davide Viganò (ITA)	Caja Rural–Seguros RGA	+ 0"
3	Sergey Shilov (RUS)	Lokosphinx	+ 0"
4	Stefan Schumacher (GER)	Christina Watches–Dana	+ 0"
5	Filipe Cardoso (POR)	Efapel–Glassdrive	+ 0"
6	Alexander Krieger (GER)	Team Stuttgart	+ 0"
7	José Gonçalves (POR)	Portugal (national team)	+ 0"
8	Maximilian Werda (GER)	Team Stölting	+ 0"
9	Jorge Martín Montenegro (ARG)	Louletano–Dunas Douradas	+ 0"
10	Christian Mager (GER)	Team Stölting	+ 0"

Final general classification
Rank	Rider	Team	Time
1	Gustavo César (ESP)	OFM–Quinta da Lixa	42h 40' 23"
2	Rui Sousa (POR)	Rádio Popular	+ 1' 45"
3	Delio Fernández (ESP)	OFM–Quinta da Lixa	+ 2' 38"
4	Joni Brandão (POR)	Efapel–Glassdrive	+ 2' 54"
5	Edgar Pinto (POR)	LA Alumínios–Antarte	+ 3' 10"
6	Ricardo Vilela (POR)	OFM–Quinta da Lixa	+ 4' 38"
7	Víctor de la Parte (ESP)	Efapel–Glassdrive	+ 5' 15"
8	Virgilio Santos (POR)	Rádio Popular	+ 6' 42"
9	Amaro Antunes (POR)	Banco BIC–Carmim	+ 7' 04"
10	Sandro Pinto (POR)	Louletano–Dunas Douradas	+ 7' 08"

== Classification leadership ==
Stage	Winner	General classification Classificação Geral Individual	Points classification Classificação dos Pontos	Mountains classification Classificação da Montanha	Young rider classification Classificação da Juventude	Team classification Classificação por Equipas
P (ITT)	Víctor de la Parte	Víctor de la Parte	not awarded	not awarded	Rubén Fernández	Efapel–Glassdrive
1	Phil Bauhaus	Víctor de la Parte	Phil Bauhaus	Pablo Torres	Rubén Fernández	Efapel–Glassdrive
2	Davide Viganò	Víctor de la Parte	Davide Viganò	António Carvalho	Rubén Fernández	Efapel–Glassdrive
3	David Belda	Gustavo César	Davide Viganò	António Carvalho	Rubén Fernández	Efapel–Glassdrive
4	Edgar Pinto	Gustavo César	Davide Viganò	António Carvalho	Rubén Fernández	OFM–Quinta da Lixa
5	David Belda	Gustavo César	David Belda	António Carvalho	Rubén Fernández	OFM–Quinta da Lixa
6	Phil Bauhaus	Gustavo César	Davide Viganò	António Carvalho	Rubén Fernández	OFM–Quinta da Lixa
7	Rui Sousa	Gustavo César	Davide Viganò	António Carvalho	Heiner Parra	OFM–Quinta da Lixa
8	Sergey Shilov	Gustavo César	Davide Viganò	António Carvalho	Heiner Parra	OFM–Quinta da Lixa
9 (ITT)	Gustavo César	Gustavo César	Gustavo César	António Carvalho	David Rodrigues	OFM–Quinta da Lixa
10	Manuel Cardoso	Gustavo César	Davide Viganò	António Carvalho	David Rodrigues	OFM–Quinta da Lixa
Final		Gustavo César	Davide Viganò	Antonio Carvalho	David Rodrigues	OFM–Quinta da Lixa
