= 2019 Vuelta a Asturias =

Race details
- Dates: 3–5 May 2019
- Stages: 3
- Distance: 469.3 km (291.6 mi)
- Winning time: 11h 34' 16"

Results
Jersey awarded to the overall winner	Winner	Richard Carapaz (ECU)	(Movistar Team)
	Second	Krists Neilands (LAT)	(Israel Cycling Academy)
	Third	Aleksandr Vlasov (RUS)	(Gazprom–RusVelo)
Jersey awarded to the points classification winner	Points	Richard Carapaz (ECU)	(Movistar Team)
Jersey awarded to the mountains classification winner	Mountains	Daniel Turek (CZE)	(Israel Cycling Academy)
	Young rider	Aleksandr Vlasov (RUS)	(Gazprom–RusVelo)
Jersey awarded to the sprints classification winner	Sprints	Paco Mancebo (ESP)	(Matrix Powertag)

The 2019 Vuelta a Asturias was the 62nd edition of the Vuelta a Asturias road cycling stage race, which was held from 3 May to 5 May 2019. The race started and finished in Oviedo. The race was won by Richard Carapaz of the Movistar Team.

== General classification ==
Final general classification

Rank	Rider	Team	Time
1	Richard Carapaz (ECU)	Movistar Team	11h 34' 16"
2	Krists Neilands (LAT)	Israel Cycling Academy	+ 2' 00"
3	Aleksandr Vlasov (RUS)	Gazprom–RusVelo	+ 2' 04"
4	Edgar Pinto (POR)	W52 / FC Porto	+ 2' 43"
5	Vicente García de Mateos (ESP)	Ludofoods–Louletano	+ 2' 48"
6	David Rodrigues (POR)	Rádio Popular–Boavista	+ 2' 49"
7	Jonathan Lastra (ESP)	Caja Rural–Seguros RGA	+ 2' 53"
8	Mikel Bizkarra (ESP)	Euskadi–Murias	+ 2' 57"
9	Artem Nych (RUS)	Gazprom–RusVelo	+ 3' 26"
10	Jhojan García (COL)	Team Manzana Postobón	+ 3' 51"
