= 2014 Volta ao Algarve =

Race details
- Dates: 19–23 February 2014
- Stages: 5
- Distance: 689.9 km (428.7 mi)
- Winning time: 16h 29' 57"

Results
Jersey awarded to the overall winner	Winner	Michał Kwiatkowski (Poland)	(Omega Pharma–Quick-Step)
	Second	Alberto Contador (Spain)	(Tinkoff–Saxo)
	Third	Rui Costa (Portugal)	(Lampre–Merida)
Jersey awarded to the points classification winner	Points	Rui Costa (Portugal)	(Lampre–Merida)
Jersey awarded to the mountains classification winner	Mountains	Valter Pereira (Portugal)	(Banco BIC–Carmim)
Jersey awarded to the sprints classification winner	Sprints	César Fonte (Portugal)	(Rádio Popular)
	Team	Lampre–Merida	

The 2014 Volta ao Algarve was the 40th edition of the Volta ao Algarve cycling stage race. It was rated as a 2.1 event on the UCI Europe Tour, and was held from 19 to 23 February 2014, in Portugal.

The race was won by Omega Pharma–Quick-Step rider Michał Kwiatkowski – taking the first stage race win of his career – after taking the race lead with a solo stage victory on the second stage; he further extended his lead in the following day's individual time trial, before holding his lead to the end of the race. Kwiatkowski's winning margin over runner-up Alberto Contador of Tinkoff–Saxo was 19 seconds, and world champion Rui Costa (Lampre–Merida) completed the podium, 13 seconds down on Contador and 32 seconds in arrears of Kwiatkowski. Contador won the queen stage of the race on the penultimate day, to the Alto do Malhão, while Costa finished second on three stages, and finished as the best-placed Portuguese rider.

Portuguese cyclists were prominent in the race's other classifications. Costa's consistent finishing allowed him to take home the green jersey as the winner of the points classification, while Banco BIC–Carmim's Valter Pereira and Rádio Popular's César Fonte held the lead from start to finish of the mountains and sprints classifications respectively. Costa's Lampre–Merida squad were the winners of the teams classification, after Chris Horner also finished inside the top ten overall and Sacha Modolo took a stage victory on the opening day.

== Race overview ==
Stage	Date	Course	Distance	Type	Winner
1	19 February	Faro to Albufeira	160 km (99.4 mi)	Flat stage	Sacha Modolo (ITA)
2	20 February	Lagoa to Monchique	196 km (121.8 mi)	Hilly stage	Michał Kwiatkowski (POL)
3	21 February	Vila do Bispo to Sagres	13.6 km (8.5 mi)	Individual time trial	Michał Kwiatkowski (POL)
4	22 February	Almodôvar to Loulé (Alto do Malhão)	164.5 km (102.2 mi)	Mountain stage	Alberto Contador (ESP)
5	23 February	Tavira to Vilamoura	155.8 km (96.8 mi)	Flat stage	Mark Cavendish (GBR)

== Stages ==
=== Stage 1 ===
19 February 2014 — Faro to Albufeira, 160 km (99.4 mi)

Stage 1 Result

	Rider	Team	Time
1	Sacha Modolo (ITA)	Lampre–Merida	3h 51' 46"
2	Rui Costa (POR)	Lampre–Merida	s.t.
3	Alessandro Petacchi (ITA)	Omega Pharma–Quick-Step	s.t.
4	Bryan Coquard (FRA)	Team Europcar	s.t.
5	Danilo Napolitano (ITA)	Wanty–Groupe Gobert	s.t.
6	Arnaud Démare (FRA)	FDJ.fr	s.t.
7	Edgar Pinto (POR)	LA Alumínios–Antarte	s.t.
8	Daniel Schorn (AUT)	NetApp–Endura	s.t.
9	Alexey Tsatevich (RUS)	Team Katusha	s.t.
10	Juan José Lobato (ESP)	Movistar Team	s.t.

General Classification after Stage 1

	Rider	Team	Time
1	Sacha Modolo (ITA)	Lampre–Merida	3h 51' 36"
2	César Fonte (POR)	Rádio Popular	+ 1"
3	Rui Costa (POR)	Lampre–Merida	+ 4"
4	Alessandro Petacchi (ITA)	Omega Pharma–Quick-Step	+ 6"
5	Luís Afonso (POR)	LA Alumínios–Antarte	+ 6"
6	Bryan Coquard (FRA)	Team Europcar	+ 10"
7	Danilo Napolitano (ITA)	Wanty–Groupe Gobert	+ 10"
8	Arnaud Démare (FRA)	FDJ.fr	+ 10"
9	Edgar Pinto (POR)	LA Alumínios–Antarte	+ 10"
10	Daniel Schorn (AUT)	NetApp–Endura	+ 10"

=== Stage 2 ===
20 February 2014 — Lagoa to Monchique, 196 km (121.8 mi)

Stage 2 Result

	Rider	Team	Time
1	Michał Kwiatkowski (POL)	Omega Pharma–Quick-Step	4h 57' 57"
2	Rui Costa (POR)	Lampre–Merida	+ 6"
3	Alberto Contador (ESP)	Tinkoff–Saxo	+ 6"
4	Eduard Prades (ESP)	OFM-Quinta da Lixa	+ 6"
5	Alexandre Geniez (FRA)	FDJ.fr	+ 17"
6	Sergey Chernetskiy (RUS)	Team Katusha	+ 17"
7	Chris Horner (USA)	Lampre–Merida	+ 17"
8	Sergey Firsanov (RUS)	RusVelo	+ 17"
9	Jonathan Castroviejo (ESP)	Movistar Team	+ 17"
10	Edgar Pinto (POR)	LA Alumínios–Antarte	+ 17"

General Classification after Stage 2

	Rider	Team	Time
1	Michał Kwiatkowski (POL)	Omega Pharma–Quick-Step	8h 49' 33"
2	Rui Costa (POR)	Lampre–Merida	+ 4"
3	Alberto Contador (ESP)	Tinkoff–Saxo	+ 12"
4	Eduard Prades (ESP)	OFM-Quinta da Lixa	+ 16"
5	Edgar Pinto (POR)	LA Alumínios–Antarte	+ 27"
6	Rubén Fernández (ESP)	Caja Rural–Seguros RGA	+ 27"
7	Sergey Chernetskiy (RUS)	Team Katusha	+ 27"
8	Jonathan Castroviejo (ESP)	Movistar Team	+ 27"
9	Simon Špilak (SLO)	Team Katusha	+ 27"
10	Chris Horner (USA)	Lampre–Merida	+ 27"

=== Stage 3 ===
21 February 2014 — Vila do Bispo to Sagres, 13.6 km (8.5 mi), individual time trial (ITT)

Stage 3 Result

	Rider	Team	Time
1	Michał Kwiatkowski (POL)	Omega Pharma–Quick-Step	14' 03"
2	Adriano Malori (ITA)	Movistar Team	+ 11"
3	Tony Martin (GER)	Omega Pharma–Quick-Step	+ 13"
4	Alberto Contador (ESP)	Tinkoff–Saxo	+ 20"
5	Alex Dowsett (GBR)	Movistar Team	+ 25"
6	Jan Bárta (CZE)	NetApp–Endura	+ 28"
7	Rick Flens (NED)	Belkin Pro Cycling	+ 29"
8	Thomas De Gendt (BEL)	Omega Pharma–Quick-Step	+ 30"
9	Wilco Kelderman (NED)	Belkin Pro Cycling	+ 30"
10	Alexandre Geniez (FRA)	FDJ.fr	+ 33"

General Classification after Stage 3

	Rider	Team	Time
1	Michał Kwiatkowski (POL)	Omega Pharma–Quick-Step	9h 03' 36"
2	Alberto Contador (ESP)	Tinkoff–Saxo	+ 32"
3	Rui Costa (POR)	Lampre–Merida	+ 38"
4	Alexandre Geniez (FRA)	FDJ.fr	+ 1' 00"
5	Sergey Chernetskiy (RUS)	Team Katusha	+ 1' 03"
6	Wilco Kelderman (NED)	Belkin Pro Cycling	+ 1' 08"
7	Rubén Fernández (ESP)	Caja Rural–Seguros RGA	+ 1' 20"
8	Simon Špilak (SLO)	Team Katusha	+ 1' 23"
9	Chris Horner (USA)	Lampre–Merida	+ 1' 24"
10	Eduard Prades (ESP)	OFM-Quinta da Lixa	+ 1' 25"

=== Stage 4 ===
22 February 2014 — Almodôvar to Loulé–Alto do Malhão, 164.5 km (102.2 mi)

Stage 4 Result

	Rider	Team	Time
1	Alberto Contador (ESP)	Tinkoff–Saxo	4h 02' 08"
2	Rui Costa (POR)	Lampre–Merida	+ 3"
3	Michał Kwiatkowski (POL)	Omega Pharma–Quick-Step	+ 10"
4	Eduard Prades (ESP)	OFM-Quinta da Lixa	+ 13"
5	Tiago Machado (POR)	NetApp–Endura	+ 14"
6	Chris Horner (USA)	Lampre–Merida	+ 14"
7	Edgar Pinto (POR)	LA Alumínios–Antarte	+ 16"
8	Pello Bilbao (ESP)	Caja Rural–Seguros RGA	+ 16"
9	Alexandre Geniez (FRA)	FDJ.fr	+ 16"
10	Sergey Firsanov (RUS)	RusVelo	+ 16"

General Classification after Stage 4

	Rider	Team	Time
1	Michał Kwiatkowski (POL)	Omega Pharma–Quick-Step	13h 05' 50"
2	Alberto Contador (ESP)	Tinkoff–Saxo	+ 16"
3	Rui Costa (POR)	Lampre–Merida	+ 29"
4	Alexandre Geniez (FRA)	FDJ.fr	+ 1' 10"
5	Wilco Kelderman (NED)	Belkin Pro Cycling	+ 1' 29"
6	Rubén Fernández (ESP)	Caja Rural–Seguros RGA	+ 1' 30"
7	Eduard Prades (ESP)	OFM-Quinta da Lixa	+ 1' 32"
8	Chris Horner (USA)	Lampre–Merida	+ 1' 32"
9	Simon Špilak (SLO)	Team Katusha	+ 1' 38"
10	Edgar Pinto (POR)	LA Alumínios–Antarte	+ 1' 41"

=== Stage 5 ===
23 February 2014 — Tavira to Vilamoura, 155.8 km (96.8 mi)

Stage 5 Result

	Rider	Team	Time
1	Mark Cavendish (GBR)	Omega Pharma–Quick-Step	3h 24' 10"
2	Arnaud Démare (FRA)	FDJ.fr	s.t.
3	Bryan Coquard (FRA)	Team Europcar	s.t.
4	José Joaquín Rojas (ESP)	Movistar Team	s.t.
5	Sacha Modolo (ITA)	Lampre–Merida	s.t.
6	Alexey Tsatevich (RUS)	Team Katusha	s.t.
7	Danilo Napolitano (ITA)	Wanty–Groupe Gobert	s.t.
8	Igor Boev (RUS)	RusVelo	s.t.
9	Tom Leezer (NED)	Belkin Pro Cycling	s.t.
10	Yoann Offredo (FRA)	FDJ.fr	s.t.

Final General Classification

	Rider	Team	Time
1	Michał Kwiatkowski (POL)	Omega Pharma–Quick-Step	16h 29' 57"
2	Alberto Contador (ESP)	Tinkoff–Saxo	+ 19"
3	Rui Costa (POR)	Lampre–Merida	+ 32"
4	Alexandre Geniez (FRA)	FDJ.fr	+ 1' 13"
5	Wilco Kelderman (NED)	Belkin Pro Cycling	+ 1' 32"
6	Rubén Fernández (ESP)	Caja Rural–Seguros RGA	+ 1' 33"
7	Eduard Prades (ESP)	OFM-Quinta da Lixa	+ 1' 35"
8	Chris Horner (USA)	Lampre–Merida	+ 1' 35"
9	Simon Špilak (SLO)	Team Katusha	+ 1' 41"
10	Edgar Pinto (POR)	LA Alumínios–Antarte	+ 1' 42"

== Classification leadership table ==
Stage	Winner	General classification	Mountains classification	Sprints classification	Points classification	Portuguese classification	Teams classification
1	Sacha Modolo	Sacha Modolo	Valter Pereira	César Fonte	Sacha Modolo	César Fonte	Lampre–Merida
2	Michał Kwiatkowski	Michał Kwiatkowski	Valter Pereira	César Fonte	Rui Costa	Rui Costa	Lampre–Merida
3	Michał Kwiatkowski	Michał Kwiatkowski	Valter Pereira	César Fonte	Rui Costa	Rui Costa	Lampre–Merida
4	Alberto Contador	Michał Kwiatkowski	Valter Pereira	César Fonte	Rui Costa	Rui Costa	Lampre–Merida
5	Mark Cavendish	Michał Kwiatkowski	Valter Pereira	César Fonte	Rui Costa	Rui Costa	Lampre–Merida
Final		Michał Kwiatkowski	Valter Pereira	César Fonte	Rui Costa	Rui Costa	Lampre–Merida
