= 2017 GP Miguel Induráin =

2017 GP Miguel Indurain
2017 UCI Europe Tour

Race details
- Dates: 1 April 2017
- Stages: 1
- Distance: 186 km (116 mi)
- Winning time: 4h 34' 01"

Results
	Winner	Simon Yates (GBR)	(Orica–Scott)
	Second	Michael Woods (CAN)	(Cannondale–Drapac)
	Third	Sergio Henao (COL)	(Team Sky)

The 2017 Grand Prix Miguel Indurain was a one-day road cycling race that took place on 1 April 2017. It was the 68th edition of the GP Miguel Indurain and was rated as a 1.1 event as part of the 2017 UCI Europe Tour.

The race was won by Simon Yates (Orica–Scott).

== Teams ==
Seventeen teams were invited to take part in the race. These included five UCI WorldTeams, two UCI Professional Continental teams, nine UCI Continental teams and a Spanish national team.

UCI WorldTeams

- Cannondale–Drapac
- Team Katusha–Alpecin
- Movistar Team
- Orica–Scott
- Team Sky

UCI Professional Continental Teams

- Caja Rural–Seguros RGA
- Israel Cycling Academy

UCI Continental Teams

- Burgos BH
- Equipo Bolivia
- Euskadi Basque Country–Murias
- Inteja Dominican Cycling Team
- Kuwait–Cartucho.es
- Rádio Popular–Boavista
- Rietumu Banka–Riga
- Sporting / Tavira
- W52 / FC Porto / Mestre da Cor

National teams

- Spain

== Result ==
Result
Rank	Rider	Team	Time
1	Simon Yates (GBR)	Orica–Scott	4h 34' 01"
2	Michael Woods (CAN)	Cannondale–Drapac	+ 23"
3	Sergio Henao (COL)	Team Sky	+ 23"
4	Carlos Verona (ESP)	Orica–Scott	+ 26"
5	Marc Soler (ESP)	Movistar Team	+ 28"
6	Vasil Kiryienka (BLR)	Team Sky	+ 58"
7	Rubén Fernández (ESP)	Movistar Team	+ 1' 44"
8	Gorka Izagirre (ESP)	Movistar Team	+ 1' 44"
9	Damien Howson (AUS)	Orica–Scott	+ 2' 56"
10	Toms Skujiņš (LAT)	Cannondale–Drapac	+ 3' 50"
