= Sergey Shilov (cyclist) =

Russian cyclist

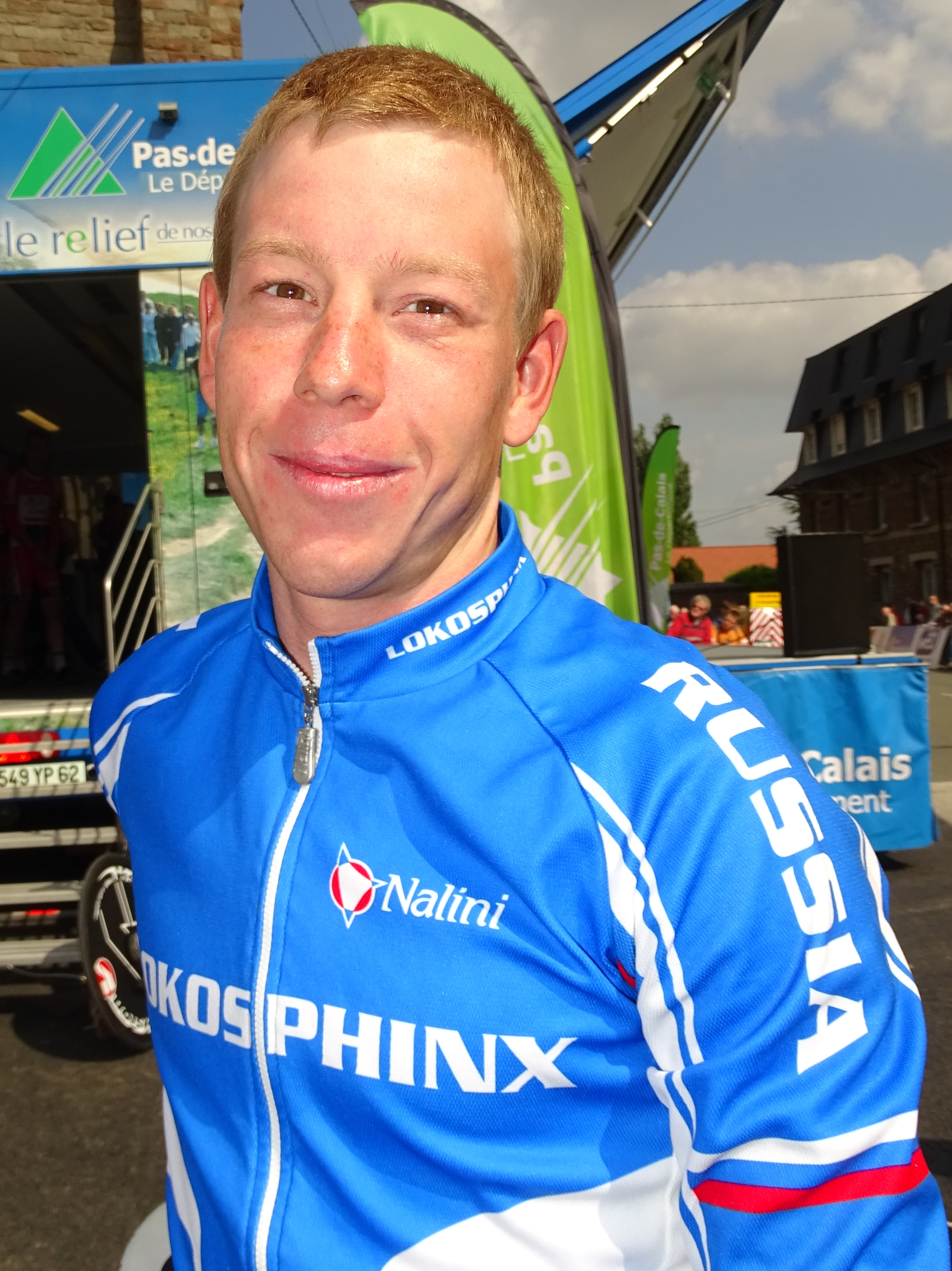
- Shilov in 2014.

Personal information
- Full name: Sergey Vladimirovich Shilov; Russian: Сергей Владимирович Шилов
- Born: 6 February 1988 (age 38)

Cycling career
- Sport: Cycling
- Discipline: Road
- Role: Rider

Amateur teams
- 2009: Moscow
- 2010–2011: Lokomotiv

Professional teams
- 2012–2017: Lokosphinx
- 2018–2019: Gazprom–RusVelo
- 2020: Aviludo–Louletano

Major wins
- One-day races and Classics National Road Race Championships (2020)
Medal record
Representing Russia
Men's track cycling
European Championships
Bronze medal – third place	2017 Berlin	Team pursuit

Sergey Vladimirovich Shilov (Russian: Сергей Владимирович Шилов; born 6 February 1988) is a Russian road racing cyclist, who most recently rode for UCI Continental team Aviludo–Louletano.

== Career ==
Shilov has won two professional level races in his career, along with several others at lower levels. His first professional win came in the 2014 Volta a Portugal, where he won the bunch sprint on stage 8 in Castelo Branco. His second professional win came the following year with victory in a reduced bunch sprint in stage 2 of the 2015 Vuelta a Castilla y León.

In 2009, he was disqualified for two years due to doping.

== Major results ==
2008
9th Memorial Oleg Dyachenko
2010
UEC European Under-23 Track Championships

1st Team pursuit
3rd Scratch

2012
1st Stage 3 Volta ao Alentejo
2nd Team pursuit, 2012–13 UCI Track Cycling World Cup, Cali
6th Memorial Davide Fardelli
8th La Roue Tourangelle
10th Klasika Primavera
2013
4th Overall Vuelta Ciclista a León

1st Points classification
1st Stage 3

10th Memorial Marco Pantani
2014
1st Stage 8 Volta a Portugal
3rd Gran Premio Industrie del Marmo
4th Overall Giro del Friuli-Venezia Giulia
5th Vuelta a La Rioja
2015
1st Team pursuit, 2015–16 UCI Track Cycling World Cup, Cali
1st Stage 2 Vuelta a Castilla y León
4th Overall Troféu Joaquim Agostinho

1st Prologue & Stage 2

7th Overall GP Liberty Seguros
7th Vuelta a La Rioja
7th Klasika Primavera
8th Overall East Bohemia Tour
8th Memorial Marco Pantani
9th Giro dell'Appennino
10th Trofeo Matteotti
2016
~~2nd Vuelta a La Rioja~~
5th Klasika Primavera
2017
1st Trofeo Matteotti
1st Prueba Villafranca de Ordizia
2nd Team pursuit, 2016–17 UCI Track Cycling World Cup, Cali
3rd Team pursuit, 2017–18 UCI Track Cycling World Cup, Pruszków
3rd Team pursuit, UEC European Track Championships
3rd Road race, National Road Championships
2018
2nd Team pursuit, 2017–18 UCI Track Cycling World Cup, Minsk
9th Overall Boucles de la Mayenne
2019
7th Giro dell'Appennino
2020
National Road Championships

1st Road race
2nd Time trial
