= Gustavo César =

Spanish road bicycle racer

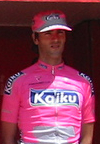

Personal information
- Full name: Gustavo César Veloso
- Born: January 29, 1980 (age 46) Vilagarcía de Arousa, Spain
- Height: 182 cm (6 ft 0 in)
- Weight: 69 kg (152 lb)

Cycling career
- Sport: Cycling
- Current team: Retired
- Discipline: Road
- Role: Rider
- Rider type: Climber

Amateur team
- 2000: Santa Cruz–Martín Códax

Professional teams
- 2001–2003: Carvalhelhos–Boavista
- 2004: Relax–Bodysol
- 2005–2006: Kaiku
- 2007–2010: Karpin–Galicia
- 2012: Andalucía
- 2013–2020: OFM–Quinta da Lixa
- 2021: Atum General / Tavira / Maria Nova Hotel

Major wins
- Grand Tours Vuelta a España 1 individual stage (2009) Stage races Volta a Catalunya (2008) Volta a Portugal (2014, 2015)

Gustavo César Veloso (born January 29, 1980, in Vilagarcía de Arousa) is a Spanish former professional road bicycle racer, who competed as a professional from 2001 to 2021.

== Major results ==
2003
1st Overall Prémio Grande Porto

1st Stage 2

1st Klasika Primavera
8th Overall Tour de l'Avenir
2004
3rd Clásica a los Puertos de Guadarrama
2005
9th Overall Vuelta a Aragón
2006
1st Stage 5 Volta a Portugal
7th Overall Vuelta a Castilla y León
7th Overall Volta ao Alentejo
2008
1st Overall Volta a Catalunya
3rd Overall Tour de Langkawi
4th Overall Tour of Turkey
10th Overall Volta ao Distrito de Santarém
2009
1st Stage 9 Vuelta a España
4th Overall Tour of Turkey
2013
2nd Overall Volta a Portugal

1st Stage 8

2nd Overall Tour do Rio
2014
1st Overall Volta a Portugal

1st Stage 9 (ITT)

2nd Overall Tour do Rio
2015
1st Overall Volta a Portugal

1st Points classification
1st Stages 6 & 9 (ITT)

1st Overall Tour do Rio

1st Stage 2

2016
2nd Overall Volta a Portugal

1st Points classification
1st Stages 4, 6 & 10 (ITT)

7th Overall Troféu Joaquim Agostinho

1st Stage 3

2017
Volta a Portugal

1st Stages 5 & 10 (ITT)

2018
1st Stage 5 (ITT) Volta ao Alentejo
6th Clássica Aldeias do Xisto
6th Klasika Primavera
2019
3rd Overall Volta a Portugal
5th Overall Troféu Joaquim Agostinho

1st Prologue

2020
2nd Overall Volta a Portugal

1st Prologue & Stage 8 (ITT)
