= 2011 Volta a Catalunya =

2011 UCI World Tour, race 5 of 27
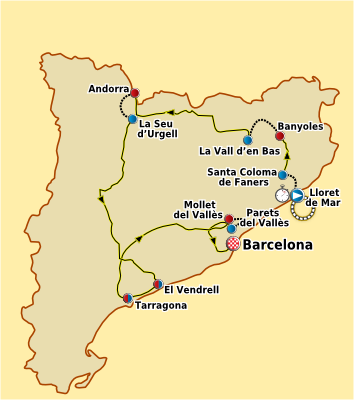

Race details
- Dates: 21–27 March
- Stages: 7
- Distance: 1,242.6 km (772.1 mi)
- Winning time: 29h 24' 42"

Results
Jersey awarded to the overall winner	Winner	Michele Scarponi (ITA)	(Lampre–ISD)
	Second	Dan Martin (IRL)	(Garmin–Cervélo)
	Third	Chris Horner (USA)	(Team RadioShack)
Jersey awarded to the mountains classification winner	Mountains	Nairo Quintana (COL)	(Colombia es Pasión–Café de Colombia)
Jersey awarded to the sprints classification winner	Sprints	Rubén Pérez (ESP)	(Euskaltel–Euskadi)
	Team	Team RadioShack	

The 2011 Volta a Catalunya was the 91st running of the Volta a Catalunya cycling stage race. It started on 21 March in Lloret de Mar and ended on 27 March in Barcelona, and consisted on seven stages. It was the fifth race of the 2011 UCI World Tour season.

The race was won by Saxo Bank–SunGard rider Alberto Contador, who claimed the leader's white with green-striped jersey with a stage win on stage three, maintaining his advantage until the end of the race. Contador's winning margin over runner-up Michele Scarponi (Lampre–ISD) was 23 seconds, and Garmin–Cervélo's Dan Martin completed the podium, 35 seconds down on Contador. Martin made the podium at the expense of Team RadioShack rider Levi Leipheimer, who pulled out of the race before the final stage.

In the race's other classifications, Euskaltel–Euskadi's Rubén Pérez took home the white jersey for amassing the highest number of points during stages at intermediate sprints, Colombia es Pasión–Café de Colombia rider Nairo Quintana won the King of the Mountains classification, with Team RadioShack finishing at the head of the teams classification.

== Teams ==
24 teams were invited to the 2011 Volta a Catalunya. The teams were:

- Ag2r–La Mondiale
- Andalucía–Caja Granada
- Astana
- BMC Racing Team
- Caja Rural
- CCC–Polsat–Polkowice
- Cofidis
- Colombia es Pasión–Café de Colombia
- Euskaltel–Euskadi
- Garmin–Cervélo
- Geox–TMC
- HTC–Highroad
- Lampre–ISD
- Leopard Trek
- Liquigas–Cannondale
- Omega Pharma–Lotto
- Quick-Step
- Rabobank
- Movistar Team
- Team Katusha
- Team RadioShack
- Saxo Bank–SunGard
- Team Sky
- Vacansoleil–DCM

== Route ==
Stage characteristics and winners
Stage	Date	Course	Distance	Type	Winner
1	21 March	Lloret de Mar to Lloret de Mar	166.9 km (103.7 mi)		Gatis Smukulis (LAT)
2	22 March	Santa Coloma de Farners to Banyoles	169.3 km (105.2 mi)		Alessandro Petacchi (ITA)
3	23 March	La Vall d'en Bas to Vallnord	183.9 km (114.3 mi)	Mountain stage	Alberto Contador (ESP)
4	24 March	La Seu d'Urgell to El Vendrell	195 km (121.2 mi)		Manuel Antonio Cardoso (POR)
5	25 March	El Vendrell to Tarragona	213.5 km (132.7 mi)		Samuel Dumoulin (FRA)
6	26 March	Tarragona to Mollet del Vallès	195 km (121.2 mi)		José Joaquín Rojas (ESP)
7	27 March	Parets del Vallès to Barcelona	124.5 km (77.4 mi)		Samuel Dumoulin (FRA)

== Stages ==
=== Stage 1 ===
21 March 2011 – Lloret de Mar to Lloret de Mar, 166.9 km (103.7 mi)

Stage 1 Result

	Rider	Team	Time
1	Gatis Smukulis (LAT)	HTC–Highroad	4h 08' 48"
2	Alessandro Petacchi (ITA)	Lampre–ISD	+ 28"
3	José Joaquín Rojas (ESP)	Movistar Team	+ 28"
4	Rigoberto Urán (COL)	Team Sky	+ 28"
5	Jan Bakelants (BEL)	Omega Pharma–Lotto	+ 28"
6	Maxime Bouet (FRA)	Ag2r–La Mondiale	+ 28"
7	Paolo Tiralongo (ITA)	Astana	+ 28"
8	Cadel Evans (AUS)	BMC Racing Team	+ 28"
9	Bauke Mollema (NED)	Rabobank	+ 28"
10	Alberto Contador (ESP)	Saxo Bank–SunGard	+ 28"

General Classification after Stage 1

	Rider	Team	Time
1	Gatis Smukulis (LAT)	HTC–Highroad	4h 08' 48"
2	Alessandro Petacchi (ITA)	Lampre–ISD	+ 28"
3	José Joaquín Rojas (ESP)	Movistar Team	+ 28"
4	Rigoberto Urán (COL)	Team Sky	+ 28"
5	Jan Bakelants (BEL)	Omega Pharma–Lotto	+ 28"
6	Maxime Bouet (FRA)	Ag2r–La Mondiale	+ 28"
7	Paolo Tiralongo (ITA)	Astana	+ 28"
8	Cadel Evans (AUS)	BMC Racing Team	+ 28"
9	Bauke Mollema (NED)	Rabobank	+ 28"
10	Alberto Contador (ESP)	Saxo Bank–SunGard	+ 28"

=== Stage 2 ===
22 March 2011 – Santa Coloma de Farners to Banyoles, 169.3 km (105.2 mi)

Stage 2 Result

	Rider	Team	Time
1	Alessandro Petacchi (ITA)	Lampre–ISD	4h 11' 08"
2	José Joaquín Rojas (ESP)	Movistar Team	s.t.
3	Manuel Antonio Cardoso (POR)	Team RadioShack	s.t.
4	Samuel Dumoulin (FRA)	Cofidis	s.t.
5	Aitor Galdós (ESP)	Caja Rural	s.t.
6	Giacomo Nizzolo (ITA)	Leopard Trek	s.t.
7	Michel Kreder (NED)	Garmin–Cervélo	s.t.
8	Thomas Peterson (USA)	Garmin–Cervélo	s.t.
9	Valentin Iglinsky (KAZ)	Astana	s.t.
10	Carlos Barredo (ESP)	Rabobank	s.t.

General Classification after Stage 2

	Rider	Team	Time
1	Gatis Smukulis (LAT)	HTC–Highroad	8h 19' 56"
2	Alessandro Petacchi (ITA)	Lampre–ISD	+ 28"
3	José Joaquín Rojas (ESP)	Movistar Team	+ 28"
4	Jan Bakelants (BEL)	Omega Pharma–Lotto	+ 28"
5	Thomas Peterson (USA)	Garmin–Cervélo	+ 28"
6	Carlos Barredo (ESP)	Rabobank	+ 28"
7	Dario Cataldo (ITA)	Quick-Step	+ 28"
8	Jelle Vanendert (BEL)	Omega Pharma–Lotto	+ 28"
9	Alberto Contador (ESP)	Saxo Bank–SunGard	+ 28"
10	Bauke Mollema (NED)	Rabobank	+ 28"

=== Stage 3 ===
23 March 2011 – La Vall d'en Bas to Vallnord, 183.9 km (114.3 mi)

Stage 3 Result

	Rider	Team	Time
1	Alberto Contador (ESP)	Saxo Bank–SunGard	4h 45' 31"
2	Michele Scarponi (ITA)	Lampre–ISD	+ 23"
3	Levi Leipheimer (USA)	Team RadioShack	+ 23"
4	Dan Martin (IRL)	Garmin–Cervélo	+ 35"
5	Chris Horner (USA)	Team RadioShack	+ 35"
6	Alex Caño (COL)	Colombia es Pasión–Café de Colombia	+ 35"
7	Ivan Basso (ITA)	Liquigas–Cannondale	+ 38"
8	Rigoberto Urán (COL)	Team Sky	+ 38"
9	Xavier Tondó (ESP)	Movistar Team	+ 38"
10	Cadel Evans (AUS)	BMC Racing Team	+ 50"

General Classification after Stage 3

	Rider	Team	Time
1	Alberto Contador (ESP)	Saxo Bank–SunGard	13h 05' 55"
2	Levi Leipheimer (USA)	Team RadioShack	+ 23"
3	Michele Scarponi (ITA)	Lampre–ISD	+ 23"
4	Dan Martin (IRL)	Garmin–Cervélo	+ 35"
5	Chris Horner (USA)	Team RadioShack	+ 35"
6	Rigoberto Urán (COL)	Team Sky	+ 38"
7	Ivan Basso (ITA)	Liquigas–Cannondale	+ 38"
8	Xavier Tondó (ESP)	Movistar Team	+ 38"
9	Cadel Evans (AUS)	BMC Racing Team	+ 50"
10	Bauke Mollema (NED)	Rabobank	+ 1' 12"

=== Stage 4 ===
24 March 2011 – La Seu d'Urgell to El Vendrell, 195 km (121.2 mi)

Stage 4 Result

	Rider	Team	Time
1	Manuel Antonio Cardoso (POR)	Team RadioShack	4h 33' 02"
2	Giacomo Nizzolo (ITA)	Leopard Trek	s.t.
3	José Joaquín Rojas (ESP)	Movistar Team	s.t.
4	Aitor Galdós (ESP)	Caja Rural	s.t.
5	František Raboň (CZE)	HTC–Highroad	s.t.
6	Samuel Dumoulin (FRA)	Cofidis	s.t.
7	Will Clarke (AUS)	Leopard Trek	s.t.
8	Michel Kreder (NED)	Garmin–Cervélo	s.t.
9	Michał Gołaś (POL)	Vacansoleil–DCM	s.t.
10	Dan Martin (IRL)	Garmin–Cervélo	s.t.

General Classification after Stage 4

	Rider	Team	Time
1	Alberto Contador (ESP)	Saxo Bank–SunGard	17h 38' 57"
2	Levi Leipheimer (USA)	Team RadioShack	+ 23"
3	Michele Scarponi (ITA)	Lampre–ISD	+ 23"
4	Dan Martin (IRL)	Garmin–Cervélo	+ 35"
5	Chris Horner (USA)	Team RadioShack	+ 35"
6	Rigoberto Urán (COL)	Team Sky	+ 38"
7	Ivan Basso (ITA)	Liquigas–Cannondale	+ 38"
8	Xavier Tondó (ESP)	Movistar Team	+ 38"
9	Cadel Evans (AUS)	BMC Racing Team	+ 50"
10	Bauke Mollema (NED)	Rabobank	+ 1' 12"

=== Stage 5 ===
25 March 2011 – El Vendrell to Tarragona, 213.5 km (132.7 mi)

Stage 5 Result

	Rider	Team	Time
1	Samuel Dumoulin (FRA)	Cofidis	4h 49' 31"
2	José Joaquín Rojas (ESP)	Movistar Team	s.t.
3	Rubén Pérez (ESP)	Euskaltel–Euskadi	s.t.
4	Aitor Galdós (ESP)	Caja Rural	s.t.
5	Michał Gołaś (POL)	Vacansoleil–DCM	s.t.
6	Diego Milán (ESP)	Caja Rural	s.t.
7	Nicolas Roche (IRL)	Ag2r–La Mondiale	s.t.
8	Manuel Antonio Cardoso (POR)	Team RadioShack	s.t.
9	Kenny Dehaes (BEL)	Omega Pharma–Lotto	s.t.
10	František Raboň (CZE)	HTC–Highroad	s.t.

General Classification after Stage 5

	Rider	Team	Time
1	Alberto Contador (ESP)	Saxo Bank–SunGard	22h 28' 28"
2	Levi Leipheimer (USA)	Team RadioShack	+ 23"
3	Michele Scarponi (ITA)	Lampre–ISD	+ 23"
4	Dan Martin (IRL)	Garmin–Cervélo	+ 35"
5	Chris Horner (USA)	Team RadioShack	+ 35"
6	Rigoberto Urán (COL)	Team Sky	+ 38"
7	Ivan Basso (ITA)	Liquigas–Cannondale	+ 38"
8	Xavier Tondó (ESP)	Movistar Team	+ 38"
9	Cadel Evans (AUS)	BMC Racing Team	+ 50"
10	Bauke Mollema (NED)	Rabobank	+ 1' 12"

=== Stage 6 ===
26 March 2011 – Tarragona to Mollet del Vallès, 189.5 km (117.7 mi)

Stage 6 Result

	Rider	Team	Time
1	José Joaquín Rojas (ESP)	Movistar Team	4h 22' 19"
2	Manuel Antonio Cardoso (POR)	Team RadioShack	s.t.
3	Samuel Dumoulin (FRA)	Cofidis	s.t.
4	Dan Martin (IRL)	Garmin–Cervélo	s.t.
5	Diego Milán (ESP)	Caja Rural	s.t.
6	Daniele Pietropolli (ITA)	Lampre–ISD	s.t.
7	Rubén Pérez (ESP)	Euskaltel–Euskadi	s.t.
8	Kenny Dehaes (BEL)	Omega Pharma–Lotto	s.t.
9	Rémi Cusin (FRA)	Cofidis	s.t.
10	Michał Gołaś (POL)	Vacansoleil–DCM	s.t.

General Classification after Stage 6

	Rider	Team	Time
1	Alberto Contador (ESP)	Saxo Bank–SunGard	26h 50' 47"
2	Levi Leipheimer (USA)	Team RadioShack	+ 23"
3	Michele Scarponi (ITA)	Lampre–ISD	+ 23"
4	Dan Martin (IRL)	Garmin–Cervélo	+ 35"
5	Chris Horner (USA)	Team RadioShack	+ 35"
6	Rigoberto Urán (COL)	Team Sky	+ 38"
7	Ivan Basso (ITA)	Liquigas–Cannondale	+ 38"
8	Xavier Tondó (ESP)	Movistar Team	+ 38"
9	Cadel Evans (AUS)	BMC Racing Team	+ 50"
10	Kevin Seeldraeyers (BEL)	Quick-Step	+ 1' 12"

=== Stage 7 ===
27 March 2011 – Parets del Vallès to Barcelona, 124.5 km (77.4 mi)

Stage 7 Result

	Rider	Team	Time
1	Samuel Dumoulin (FRA)	Cofidis	2h 33' 55"
2	Rigoberto Urán (COL)	Team Sky	s.t.
3	Kenny Dehaes (BEL)	Omega Pharma–Lotto	s.t.
4	José Joaquín Rojas (ESP)	Movistar Team	s.t.
5	Manuel Antonio Cardoso (POR)	Team RadioShack	s.t.
6	Aitor Galdós (ESP)	Caja Rural	s.t.
7	Michał Gołaś (POL)	Vacansoleil–DCM	s.t.
8	Blel Kadri (FRA)	Ag2r–La Mondiale	s.t.
9	Ivan Rovny (RUS)	Team RadioShack	s.t.
10	Kevin Seeldraeyers (BEL)	Quick-Step	s.t.

Final General Classification

	Rider	Team	Time
1	Michele Scarponi (ITA)	Lampre–ISD	29h 25' 05"
2	Dan Martin (IRL)	Garmin–Cervélo	+ 12"
3	Chris Horner (USA)	Team RadioShack	+ 12"
4	Rigoberto Urán (COL)	Team Sky	+ 15"
5	Xavier Tondó (ESP)	Movistar Team	+ 15"
6	Ivan Basso (ITA)	Liquigas–Cannondale	+ 15"
7	Cadel Evans (AUS)	BMC Racing Team	+ 27"
8	Kevin Seeldraeyers (BEL)	Quick-Step	+ 49"
9	Bauke Mollema (NED)	Rabobank	+ 49"
10	Blel Kadri (FRA)	Ag2r–La Mondiale	+ 49"

== Classification leadership ==
In the 2011 Volta a Catalunya, three different jerseys were awarded. For the general classification, calculated by adding the finishing times of the stages per cyclist, the leader received a white jersey with green stripes on the sleeves, midsection, and collar. This classification was considered the most important of the Volta a Catalunya, and the winner of the general classification was considered the winner of the Volta a Catalunya.

Additionally, there was also a sprint classification, indicated with a white jersey. In the sprint classification, cyclists received points for being one of the first three in intermediate sprints, with three points awarded for first place, two for second, and one for third.

There was also a mountains classification, indicated with a red jersey. In the mountains classifications, points were won by reaching the top of a mountain before other cyclists. All climbs were categorized, hors-, first, second, or third-category, with more points available for the higher-categorized climbs.

Stage	Winner	General Classification	Mountains Classification	Sprint Classification	Team Classification
1	Gatis Smukulis	Gatis Smukulis	Gatis Smukulis	Ben Gastauer	HTC–Highroad
2	Alessandro Petacchi	Gatis Smukulis	Julián Sánchez	Rubén Pérez	HTC–Highroad
3	Michele Scarponi	Levi Leipheimer	Michele Scarponi	José Vicente Toribio	Team RadioShack
4	Manuel Antonio Cardoso	Levi Leipheimer	Michele Scarponi	Rubén Pérez	Team RadioShack
5	Samuel Dumoulin	Levi Leipheimer	Nairo Quintana	Rubén Pérez	Team RadioShack
6	José Joaquín Rojas	Levi Leipheimer	Nairo Quintana	Rubén Pérez	Team RadioShack
7	Samuel Dumoulin	Michele Scarponi	Nairo Quintana	Rubén Pérez	Team RadioShack
Final		Michele Scarponi	Nairo Quintana	Rubén Pérez	Team RadioShack
