= 2013 Volta a Portugal =

2013 UCI Europe Tour

Race details
- Dates: August 7–18
- Stages: 10 + Prologue
- Distance: 1,607.8 km (999.0 mi)
- Winning time: 43h02m20s

Results
| Jersey awarded to the overall winner | Winner | Alejandro Marque (Spain) | (OFM-Quinta da Lixa) |
| | Second | Gustavo César (Spain) | (OFM-Quinta da Lixa) |
| | Third | Rui Sousa (Portugal) | (Efapel-Glassdrive) |
| Jersey awarded to the points classification winner | Points | Manuel Cardoso (Portugal) | (Caja Rural–Seguros RGA) |
| Jersey awarded to the mountains classification winner | Mountains | Márcio Barbosa (Portugal) | (LA-Antarte) |
| Jersey awarded to the young rider classification winner | Young rider | Vladislav Gorbunov (Kazakhstan) | (Astana CT) |
| | Team | (Portugal) Efapel-Glassdrive | |

The 2013 Volta a Portugal was a men's road bicycle race held from 7 to 18 August 2013. It was the 75th edition of the men's stage race to be held, which was established in 1927. As part of the 2013 UCI Europe Tour, it is rated as a 2.1 event. The Spanish cyclist Alejandro Marque from OFM-Quinta da Lixa won the race.

== Schedule ==
| Stage | Route | Distance | Date | Type | Winner |
|---|---|---|---|---|---|
| Prologue | Lisbon > Lisbon | 5 km | August 7 | Team time trial | Cycling Team De Rijke–Shanks |
| 1 | Bombarral > Aveiro | 203.3 km | August 8 | Flat stage | Alexander Serov (RUS) |
| 2 | Oliveira de Azeméis > Viana do Castelo - Santa Lúzia | 186.8 km | August 9 | Medium-mountain stage | Rui Sousa (POR) |
| 3 | Trofa > Fafe | 165.8 km | August 10 | Flat stage | Délio Fernández (ESP) |
| 4 | Arouca > Mondim de Basto (Srª da Graça) | 181.4 km | August 11 | Mountain stage | Sergio Pardilla (ESP) |
| 5 | Lousada > Oliveira do Bairro | 177.3 km | August 12 | Medium-mountain stage | Manuel Cardoso (POR) |
| 6 | Sertã > Castelo Branco | 180 km | August 14 | Flat stage | Maxime Daniel (FRA) |
| 7 | Termas de Monfortinho > Gouveia | 176.3 km | August 15 | Medium-mountain stage | Raúl Alarcón (ESP) |
| 8 | Oliveira do Hospital > Torre | 166.3 km | August 16 | Mountain stage | Gustavo César (ESP) |
| 9 | Sabugal > Guarda | 35.6 km | August 17 | Individual time trial | Alejandro Marque (ESP) |
| 10 | Viseu > Viseu | 130 km | August 18 | Flat stage | Jacob Keough (USA) |

== Participating teams ==
In total, 17 teams are set to compete.

- National teams:
  - Banco BIC–Carmim
  - Efapel–Glassdrive
  - LA-Antarte
  - Louletano-Dunas Douradas
  - OFM-Quinta da Lixa
  - Rádio Popular-Onda
- International teams:
  - Caja Rural–Seguros RGA
  - MTN–Qhubeka
  - UnitedHealthcare
  - Sojasun
  - IAM Cycling
  - RusVelo
  - Bretagne–Séché Environnement
  - Leopard–Trek Continental Team
  - Ceramica Flaminia–Fondriest
  - Astana Continental Team
  - Cycling Team De Rijke–Shanks

== Classification leadership ==
| Stage | Winner | General classification Classificação Geral Individual | Points classification Classificação dos Pontos | Mountains classification Classificação da Montanha | Young rider classification Classificação da Juventude | Team classification Classificação por Equipas |
|---|---|---|---|---|---|---|
| Prologue | Cycling Team De Rijke–Shanks | Christoph Pfingsten | not awarded | not awarded | Sean de Bie | Cycling Team De Rijke–Shanks |
| 1 | Alexander Serov | Christoph Pfingsten | Alexander Serov | Ronan Van Zandbeek | Fábio Silvestre | Cycling Team De Rijke–Shanks |
| 2 | Rui Sousa | Marcel Wyss | Maxime Daniel | Rui Sousa | Vladislav Gorbunov | Efapel–Glassdrive |
| 3 | Délio Fernández | Marcel Wyss | Manuel Cardoso | Hélder Oliveira | Vladislav Gorbunov | Efapel–Glassdrive |
| 4 | Sergio Pardilla | Sergio Pardilla | Rui Sousa | Márcio Barbosa | Vladislav Gorbunov | Efapel–Glassdrive |
| 5 | Manuel Cardoso | Sergio Pardilla | Manuel Cardoso | Márcio Barbosa | Vladislav Gorbunov | Efapel–Glassdrive |
| 6 | Maxime Daniel | Sergio Pardilla | Manuel Cardoso | Márcio Barbosa | Vladislav Gorbunov | Efapel–Glassdrive |
| 7 | Raul Alarcon | Sergio Pardilla | Manuel Cardoso | Márcio Barbosa | Vladislav Gorbunov | Efapel–Glassdrive |
| 8 | Gustavo César | Rui Sousa | Edgar Pinto | Márcio Barbosa | Vladislav Gorbunov | Efapel–Glassdrive |
| 9 | Alejandro Marque | Alejandro Marque | Rui Sousa | Márcio Barbosa | Vladislav Gorbunov | Efapel–Glassdrive |
| 10 | Jacob Keough | Alejandro Marque | Manuel Cardoso | Márcio Barbosa | Vladislav Gorbunov | Efapel–Glassdrive |
| Final Classification | | Alejandro Marque | Manuel Cardoso | Márcio Barbosa | Vladislav Gorbunov | Efapel–Glassdrive |
