= 2008 Clásica de Almería =

Race details
- Dates: 2 March 2008
- Stages: 1
- Distance: 187.9 km (116.8 mi)
- Winning time: 4h 22' 46"

Results
	Winner	Juan José Haedo (ARG)
	Second	Óscar Freire (ESP)
	Third	Graeme Brown (AUS)

The 2008 Clásica de Almería was the 23rd edition of the Clásica de Almería cycle race and was held on 2 March 2008. The race started in El Ejido and finished in Almería. The race was won by Juan José Haedo.

== General classification ==
Final general classification

Rank	Rider	Time
1	Juan José Haedo (ARG)	4h 22' 46"
2	Óscar Freire (ESP)	+ 0"
3	Graeme Brown (AUS)	+ 0"
4	Koldo Fernández (ESP)	+ 0"
5	José Joaquín Rojas (ESP)	+ 0"
6	Giuseppe Palumbo (ITA)	+ 0"
7	Francisco Ventoso (ESP)	+ 0"
8	Edgar Pinto (POR)	+ 0"
9	Juan Francisco Mouron (ESP)	+ 0"
10	Rafael Rodríguez (ESP)	+ 0"
