= Delio Fernández =

Spanish cyclist

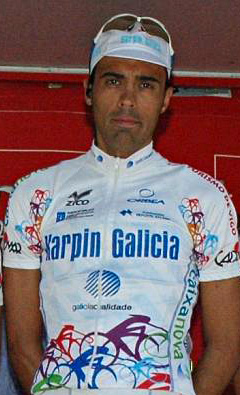
- Fernández in 2008.

Personal information
- Full name: Delio Fernández Cruz
- Born: 17 February 1986 (age 40) Moaña, Spain
- Height: 1.78 m (5 ft 10 in)
- Weight: 69 kg (152 lb)

Cycling career
- Sport: Cycling
- Current team: Team Tavira / Crédito Agrícola
- Discipline: Road
- Role: Rider
- Rider type: Climber

Amateur teams
- 2005: Supermercados Froiz
- 2006–2007: Caja Rural amateur

Professional teams
- 2008–2010: Karpin–Galicia
- 2011–2012: Onda
- 2013–2015: OFM–Quinta da Lixa
- 2016–2021: Delko–Marseille Provence KTM
- 2022–: Atum General / Tavira / AP Maria Nova Hotel

Delio Fernández Cruz (born 17 February 1986) is a Spanish cyclist, who currently rides for UCI Continental team Team Tavira / Crédito Agrícola.

== Major results ==
2006
3rd Oñate Saria
2011
1st Clássica Amarante
6th Klasika Primavera
2012
8th Overall Vuelta a Guatemala
2013
1st Overall GP Liberty Seguros
1st Stage 3 Volta a Portugal
2nd Overall Grande Prémio Jornal de Notícias
3rd Vuelta a la Comunidad de Madrid
4th Overall Volta ao Alentejo
4th Overall Troféu Joaquim Agostinho
5th Overall Vuelta a Asturias
7th Overall Tour do Rio
2014
1st Overall Troféu Joaquim Agostinho
3rd Overall Volta a Portugal
2015
2nd Overall Volta ao Alentejo
2nd Overall Troféu Joaquim Agostinho
4th Overall Volta a Portugal

1st Stages 2 & 7

5th Overall Vuelta a Castilla y León
5th Overall Tour do Rio
2016
4th Overall Tour of Austria
6th Overall Four Days of Dunkirk
2017
2nd Overall Tour of Austria
2018
4th Tour du Gévaudan Occitanie
7th Overall Tour of Turkey
7th Overall Tour of Almaty
10th Overall Sharjah International Cycling Tour
2019
9th Circuito de Getxo
2020
9th Overall Tour de Taiwan
10th Overall Volta a Portugal
2021
7th Overall Tour of Turkey
2022
6th Overall Volta a Portugal
8th Overall Troféu Joaquim Agostinho
2023
1st Stage 5 Volta a Portugal
8th Overall Volta ao Alentejo
2024
9th Overall Volta a Portugal
