= Ricardo Vilela =

Portuguese cyclist (born 1987)

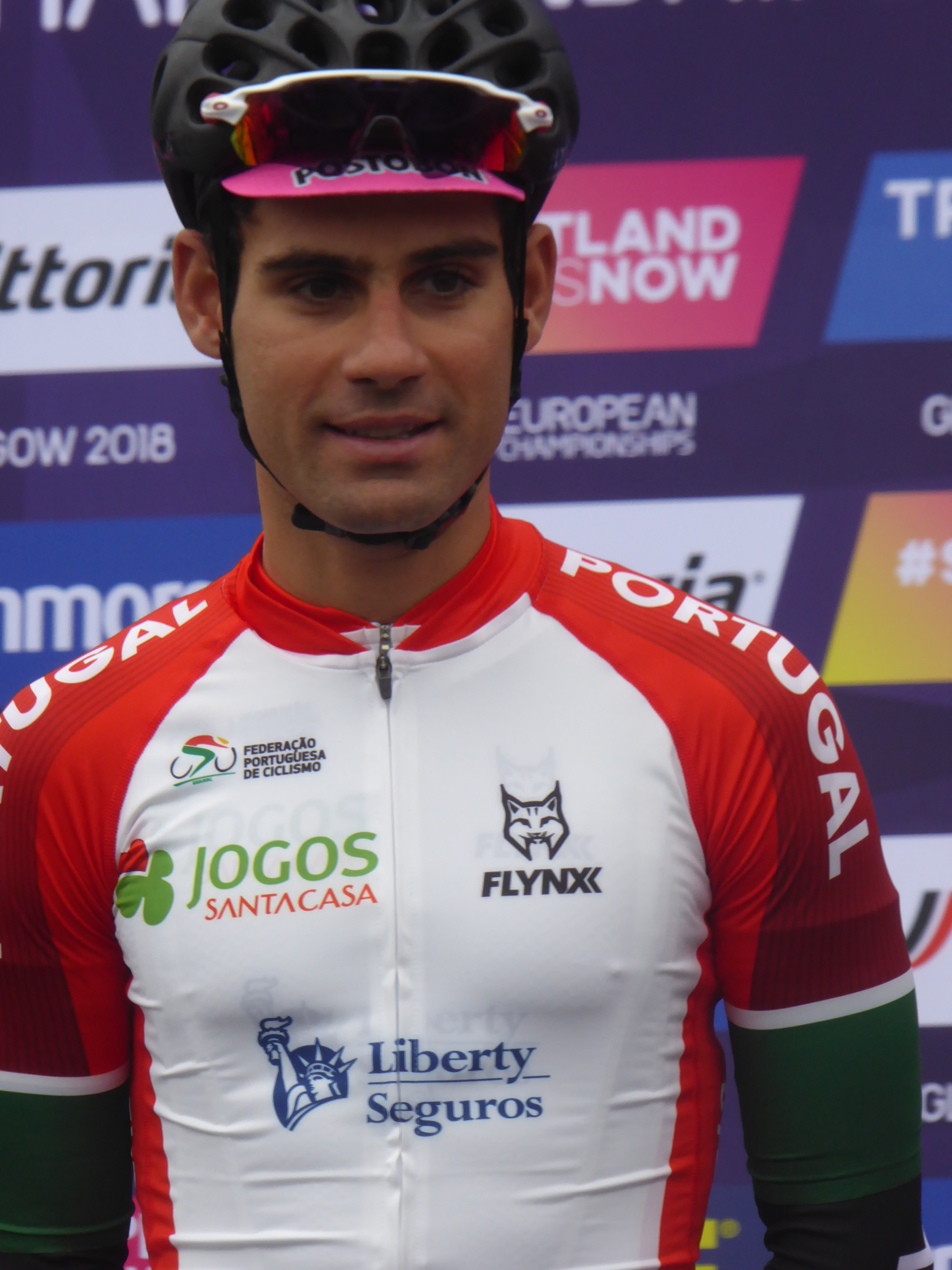
- Ricardo Vilela in 2018

Personal information
- Full name: Ricardo Augusto Vilela Afonso
- Born: 18 December 1987 (age 38) Bragança, Portugal
- Height: 1.70 m (5 ft 7 in)
- Weight: 57 kg (126 lb)

Cycling career
- Sport: Cycling
- Current team: Suspended
- Discipline: Road
- Role: Rider

Amateur teams
- 2005: Tensai–Etiel–Santa Marta
- 2006–2008: Santa Maria da Feira–E-Leclerc Moreira Congelados

Professional teams
- 2009: Liberty Seguros
- 2010–2011: Madeinox–Boavista
- 2012–2013: Efapel–Glassdrive
- 2014: OFM–Quinta da Lixa
- 2015–2016: Caja Rural–Seguros RGA
- 2017–2018: Team Manzana Postobón
- 2019–2020: Burgos BH
- 2021–2022: W52 / FC Porto

Ricardo Augusto Vilela Afonso (born 18 December 1987) is a Portuguese professional racing cyclist who last rode for UCI Continental team W52 / FC Porto. He rode in the 2015 Vuelta a España, and finished in 48th place overall.

On 4 October 2022, he received a three-year ban by UCI for doping and on 12 April 2023 he received another seven-year ban by the same reason.

== Major results ==
2008
National Under-23 Road Championships

1st Road race
2nd Time trial

2009
2nd Overall Grand Prix du Portugal
2011
4th Time trial, National Road Championships
8th Overall Troféu Joaquim Agostinho
2012
2nd Time trial, National Road Championships
2013
10th Overall Tour d'Azerbaïdjan
2014
6th Overall Volta a Portugal
2015
5th Road race, National Road Championships
8th Overall Route du Sud
2016
National Road Championships

3rd Road race
5th Time trial

6th Overall Route du Sud
10th Overall Volta a Portugal
2017
National Road Championships

3rd Road race
5th Time trial

7th Overall Boucles de la Mayenne
8th Overall Vuelta a Asturias
2018
6th Route Adélie
8th Overall Tour de l'Ain
8th Overall Tour of Qinghai Lake
9th Overall Route d'Occitanie

=== Grand Tour general classification results timeline ===
Grand Tour	2015	2016	2017	2018	2019	2020
Giro d'Italia	Has not contested during his career					
Tour de France	Has not contested during his career					
Vuelta a España	48	—	50	—	105	99

Legend
—	Did not compete
DNF	Did not finish

== See also ==
- Doping in sport
- List of doping cases in cycling
