= Manuel Cardoso (cyclist) =

Portuguese road bicycle racer

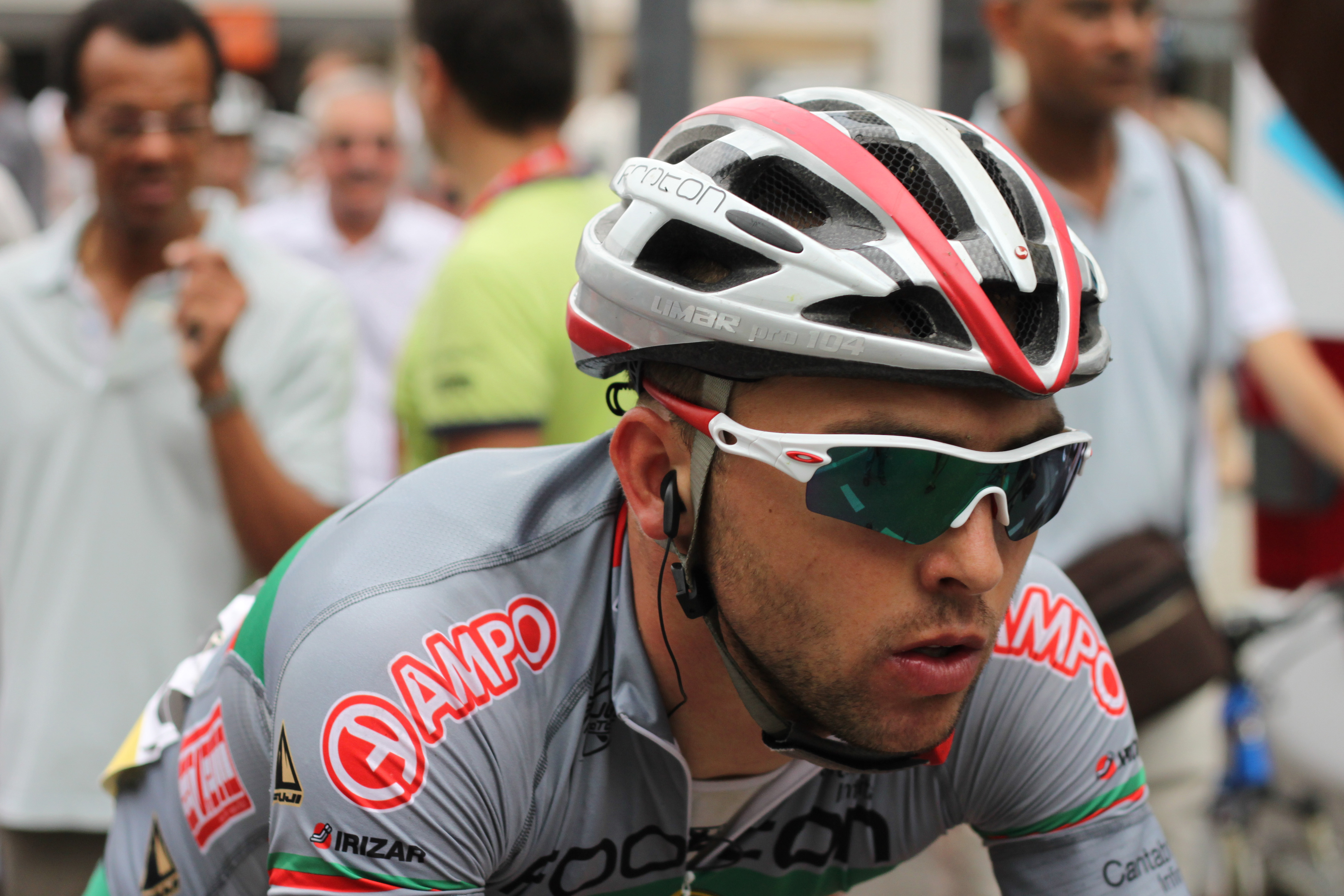

Personal information
- Full name: Manuel António Cardoso Leal
- Born: 7 April 1983 (age 43) Paços de Ferreira, Portugal

Cycling career
- Sport: Cycling
- Discipline: Road
- Role: Rider
- Rider type: Sprinter

Professional teams
- 2006–2007: Carvalhelhos–Boavista
- 2008–2009: Liberty Seguros
- 2010: Footon–Servetto–Fuji
- 2011: Team RadioShack
- 2012–2013: Caja Rural
- 2014–2015: Banco BIC–Carmim

Major wins
- Volta a Portugal Points classification (2013) 4 stages National Road Race Championships (2009, 2012) 1 stage Tour Down Under 1 stage Volta a Catalunya (2011)

Manuel António Cardoso Leal (born April 7, 1983, in Paços de Ferreira) is a Portuguese former professional road bicycle racer, who competed professionally between 2006 and 2015 for the Riberalves–Boavista, Liberty Seguros, Footon–Servetto–Fuji, Team RadioShack, Caja Rural–Seguros RGA and Tavira teams. He made his Grand Tour debut in the 2010 Tour de France, but had to pull out after the Prologue due to injuries sustained in a crash.

== Major results ==
2006
1st Stage 2 Volta a Portugal
5th Overall Grande Prémio Internacional Costa Azul
2007
Vuelta a Extremadura

1st Points classification
1st Stages 4 & 5

2008
1st Stage 3 Vuelta a la Comunidad de Madrid
Volta ao Alentejo

1st Stages 2 & 5

Volta ao Distrito de Santarém

1st Stages 1 & 4

2009
1st Road race, National Road Championships
1st Stage 1 Volta a Portugal
Troféu Joaquim Agostinho

1st Stages 1 & 4

1st Stage 1 GP CTT Correios de Portugal
1st Stage 1 Circuit de Lorraine
8th Overall La Tropicale Amissa Bongo

1st Stage 5

2010
1st Stage 3 Tour Down Under
3rd Trofeo Cala Millor
3rd Trofeo Magaluf-Palmanova
5th Trofeo Palma
2011
1st Stage 4 Volta a Catalunya
8th Vattenfall Cyclassics
2012
1st Road race, National Road Championships
1st Stage 1 Vuelta a Castilla y León
4th Trofeo Palma
4th Trofeo Migjorn
2013
Volta a Portugal

1st Points classification
1st Stage 5

2014
Tour du Maroc

1st Points classification
1st Stages 1, 7, 8 & 9

1st Stage 3 Volta ao Alentejo
1st Stage 10 Volta a Portugal
2015
5th Overall Volta ao Alentejo

1st Stage 2

== Gallery ==
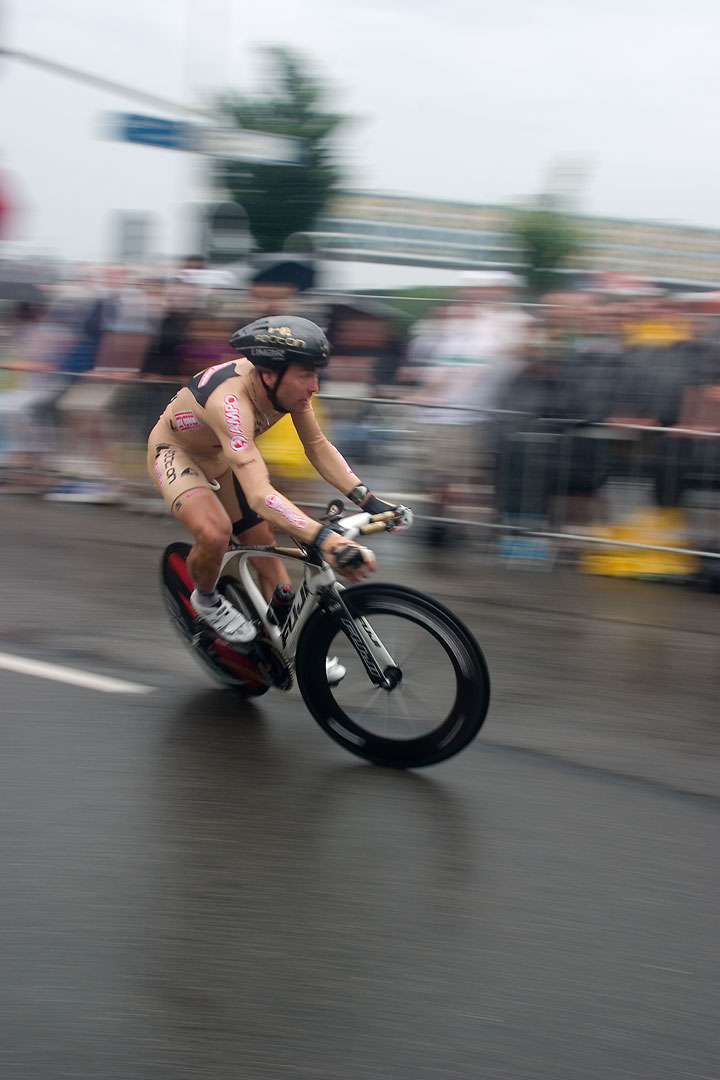

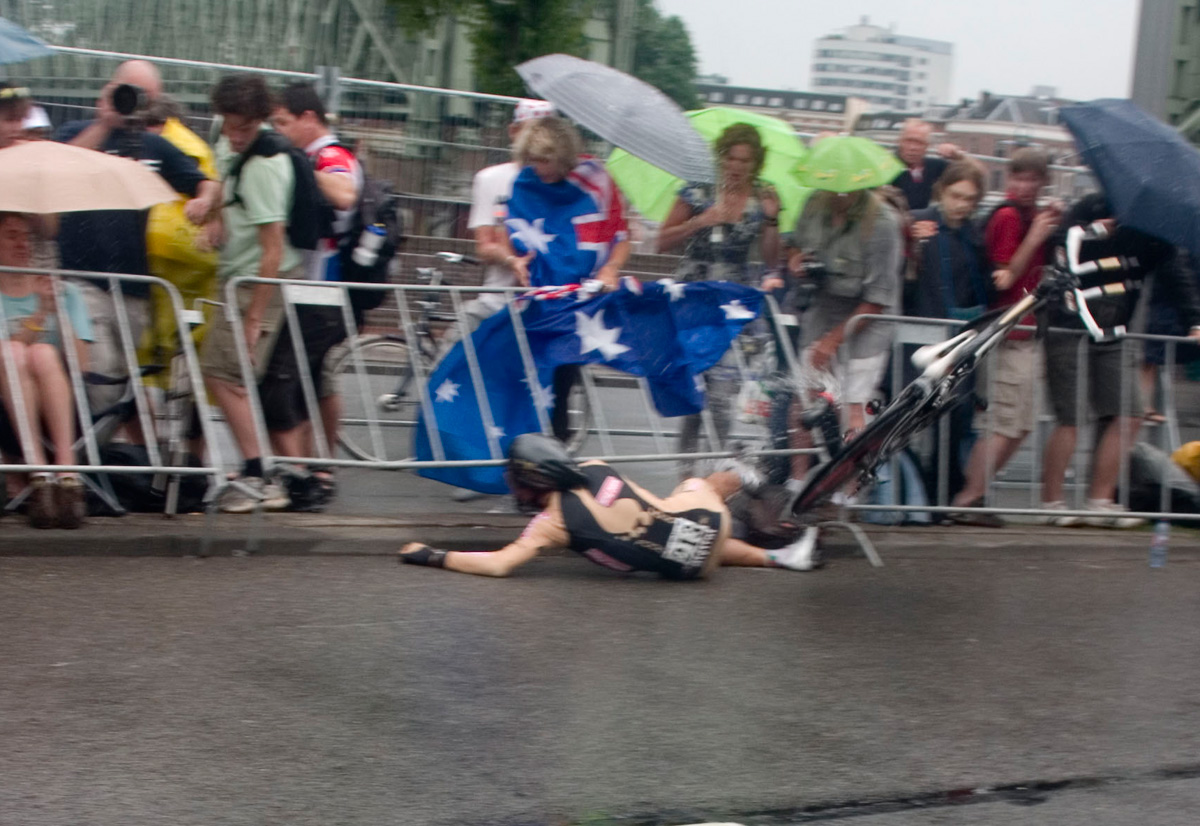

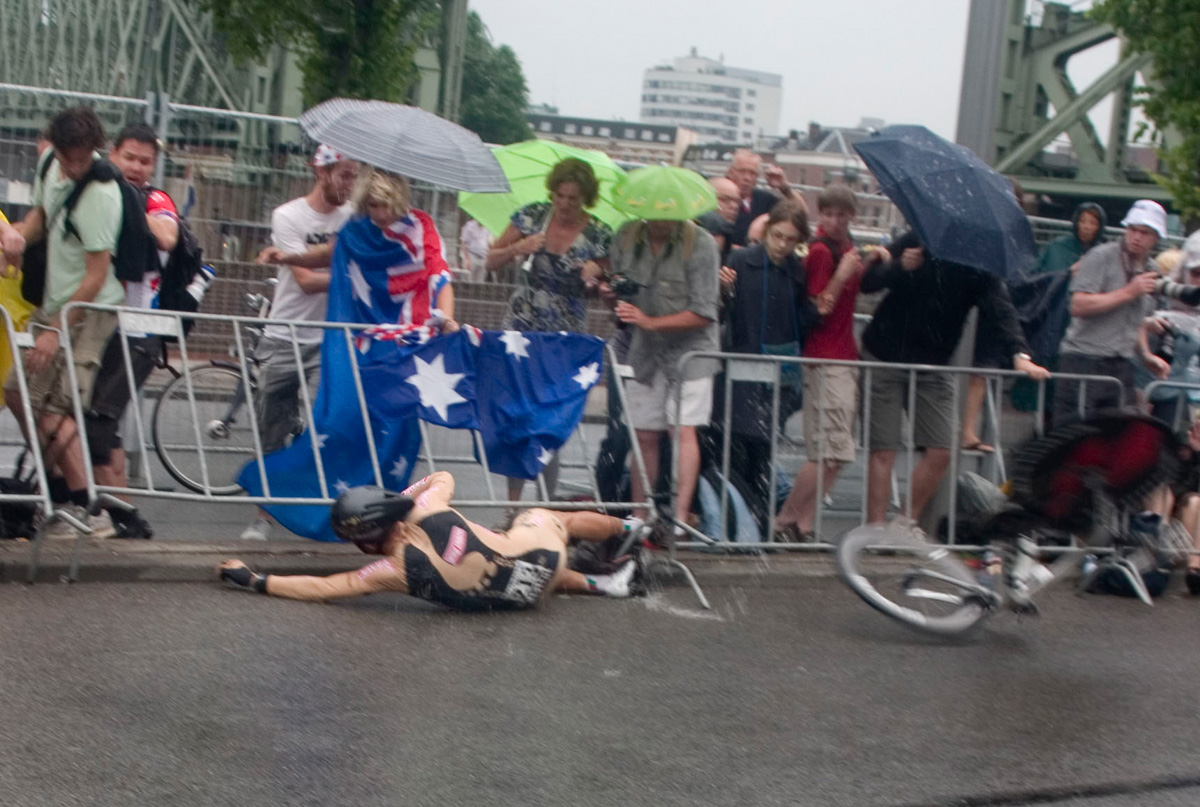

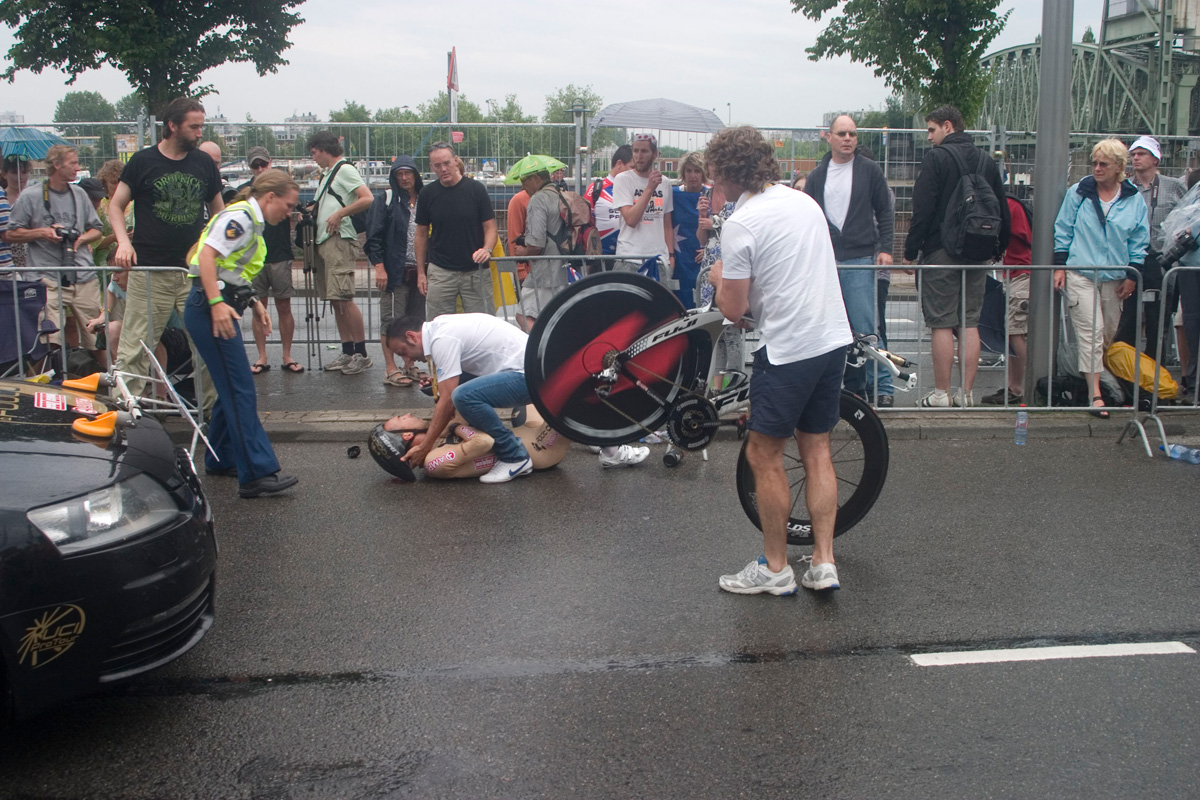

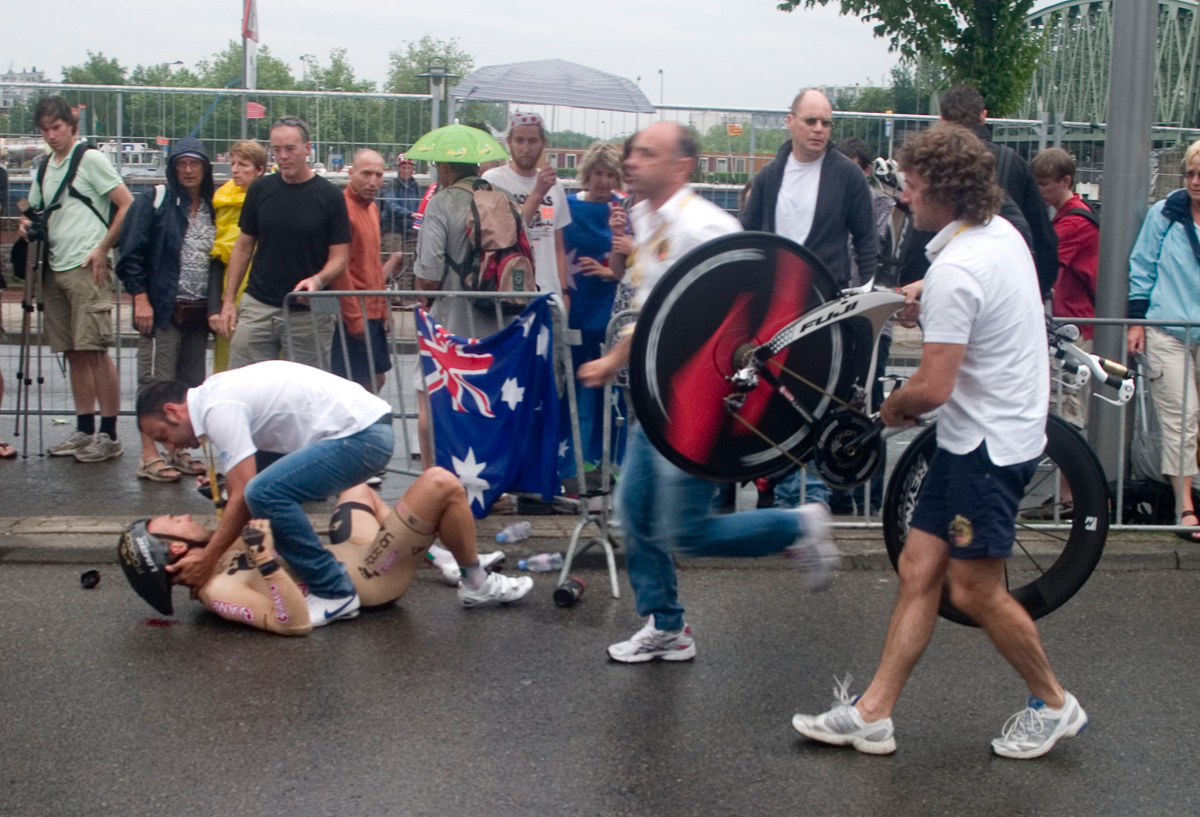
