= José Antonio Carrasco =

Spanish cyclist

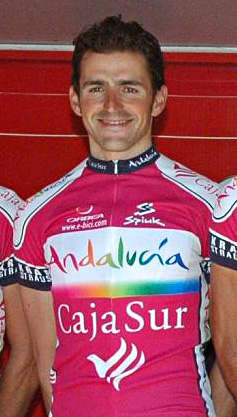

Personal information
- Full name: José Antonio Carrasco Ramírez
- Born: 8 September 1980 (age 46) Madrid, Spain

Cycling career
- Sport: Cycling
- Current team: Retired
- Discipline: Road
- Role: Rider

Amateur teams
- 2007: Andalucía-Cajasur amateur
- 2013: Diputación de León Deyser

Professional teams
- 2008–2009: Andalucía
- 2011–2012: KTM–Murcia

José Antonio Carrasco Ramírez (born 8 September 1980 in Madrid) is a former Spanish cyclist.

== Palmarès ==
2005
1st stage 3a Vuelta a Extremadura
2006
1st Vuelta Ciclista a León
2007
1st stage 2 Volta a Coruña
2012
1st stage 1 GP Abimota
