= 2014 Vuelta a Castilla y León =

Race details
- Dates: 16–18 May 2014
- Stages: 3
- Distance: 532.2 km (330.7 mi)
- Winning time: 13h 51' 48"

Results
Jersey awarded to the overall winner	Winner	David Belda (ESP)	(Team Europcar)
	Second	Marcos García (ESP)	(Caja Rural–Seguros RGA)
	Third	Sylwester Szmyd (POL)	(Movistar Team)

The 2014 Vuelta a Castilla y León was the 29th edition of the Vuelta a Castilla y León cycle race and was held on 16 May to 18 May 2014. The race started in Ciudad Rodrigo and finished in Bembibre. The race was won by David Belda.

== General classification ==
Final general classification

Rank	Rider	Time
1	David Belda (ESP)	13h 51' 48"
2	Marcos García (ESP)	+ 57"
3	Sylwester Szmyd (POL)	+ 1' 01"
4	Alexey Rybalkin (RUS)	+ 1' 38"
5	Javier Moreno (ESP)	+ 1' 55"
6	Jesús del Pino (ESP)	+ 1' 55"
7	Edgar Pinto (POR)	+ 1' 55"
8	Frederico Figueiredo (POR)	+ 1' 55"
9	António Carvalho (POR)	+ 2' 06"
10	David Arroyo (ESP)	+ 2' 06"
