= Jorge Martín Montenegro =

Argentine-Spanish bicycle racer (1983–2023)

Personal information
- Full name: Jorge Martín Montenegro Adaro
- Nickname: Tucho
- Born: 7 May 1983 Mar del Plata, Buenos Aires Province, Argentina
- Died: 25 November 2023 (aged 40)

Cycling career
- Sport: Cycling
- Discipline: Road
- Role: Rider

Amateur teams
- 2009: Andalucía–Cajasur (stagiaire)
- 2015–2021: Aluminios Cortizo–CC Padronés
- 2022: Retelec Team Cycling Galicia

Professional teams
- 2010: Andalucía–Cajasur
- 2013–2014: Louletano–Dunas Douradas

Jorge Martín Montenegro Adaro (7 May 1983 – 25 November 2023) was an Argentine-Spanish cyclist. He was suspended for doping from February to July 2017. He rode in the 2010 Vuelta a España, finishing in 150th place.

Montenegro died suddenly at his home on 25 November 2023, at the age of 40.

== Major results ==
2005
1st Road race, National Under-23 Road Championships
2007
1st Stage 5 Vuelta Ciclista a León
2008
1st Stage 2 Vuelta Ciclista a León
2009
6th Overall Vuelta al Ecuador
2010
7th Dwars door Drenthe
7th Clásica de Almería
2012
1st Stage 1 Volta ao Alentejo
2014
6th Vuelta Ciclista a La Rioja
