= Rubén Fernández (cyclist) =

Spanish cyclist

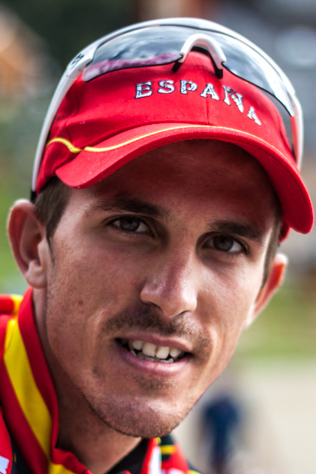
- Fernández in 2013.

Personal information
- Full name: Rubén Fernández Andújar
- Born: 1 March 1991 (age 35) Murcia, Spain
- Height: 1.77 m (5 ft 10 in)
- Weight: 60 kg (132 lb)

Cycling career
- Sport: Cycling
- Current team: Cofidis
- Disciplines: Road; Track
- Role: Rider
- Rider type: Climber

Amateur team
- 2011–2012: Caja Rural Amateur

Professional teams
- 2013–2014: Caja Rural
- 2015–2019: Movistar Team
- 2020: Fundación–Orbea
- 2021–: Cofidis

Rubén Fernández Andújar (born 1 March 1991) is a Spanish cyclist, who currently rides for UCI WorldTeam Cofidis.

== Career ==
Fernández was born in Murcia. In August 2014 Movistar Team announced the signing of the 2013 Tour de l'Avenir champion Fernández on an initial 2-year contract. Fernández remained with the team until the end of the 2019 season, when he joined the Fundación–Orbea team. Fernández signed a two-year deal with Cofidis in September 2020, from the 2021 season onwards.

== Major results ==
2012
1st Circuito Guadiana
2013
1st Overall Tour de l'Avenir

1st Stage 4

2014
6th Overall Volta ao Algarve
6th Vuelta a Murcia
10th Overall Tour du Limousin
2015
5th Overall Tour Down Under
6th Overall Tour of Britain
9th Overall Volta ao Algarve
9th Overall Vuelta a Burgos
2016
6th Overall Tour Down Under
6th Overall Tour de Pologne
6th Overall Vuelta a Burgos
Vuelta a España

Held after Stage 3
Held after Stage 3

2017
7th GP Miguel Induráin
2018
5th Overall Vuelta a Asturias
7th Overall Tour of Guangxi
2020
5th Road race, National Road Championships
7th Pollença–Andratx
8th Overall Volta a la Comunitat Valenciana
8th Trofeo Serra de Tramuntana
9th Overall Vuelta a Andalucía
2021
9th Overall UAE Tour
2022
4th Overall O Gran Camiño
7th Giro dell'Emilia
8th Overall Tour de Langkawi
2023
10th Overall O Gran Camiño

=== Grand Tour general classification results timeline ===
Grand Tour	2015	2016	2017	2018	2019	2020	2021	2022	2023	2024
Giro d'Italia	62	—	—	85	—	—	—	—	—	54
Tour de France	—	—	—	—	—	—	84	—	—	—
Vuelta a España	—	33	DNF	—	—	—	—	58	54	DNF

Legend
—	Did not compete
DNF	Did not finish
