= David Rodrigues =

Portuguese cyclist

Personal information
- Full name: David Miguel Costa Rodrigues
- Born: 10 July 1991 (age 35) Guarda, Portugal
- Height: 1.70 m (5 ft 7 in)
- Weight: 60 kg (130 lb)

Cycling career
- Sport: Cycling
- Discipline: Road
- Role: Rider

Amateur teams
- 2010: Infotre–LeeCougan
- 2011: Vitória–ASC–RTL
- 2012: ASC–KTM–Vitória
- 2013–2014: Liberty Seguros–Feira–KTM

Professional team
- 2015–2020: Rádio Popular–Boavista

David Miguel Costa Rodrigues (born 10 July 1991) is a Portuguese cyclist, who last rode for UCI Continental team Rádio Popular–Boavista.

== Major results ==
2012
1st Stage 1 Volta a Portugal do Futuro
2013
2nd Overall Volta a Portugal do Futuro
2014
1st Young rider classification, Volta a Portugal
2016
9th Overall Vuelta Asturias
2017
1st Grand Prix de Mortágua
2018
1st Stage 5 Grand Prix Abimota
2019
6th Overall Vuelta Asturias
6th Overall GP Beiras e Serra da Estrela
7th Overall Volta a Portugal
7th Overall Troféu Joaquim Agostinho
