= Angelo Tulik =

French cyclist

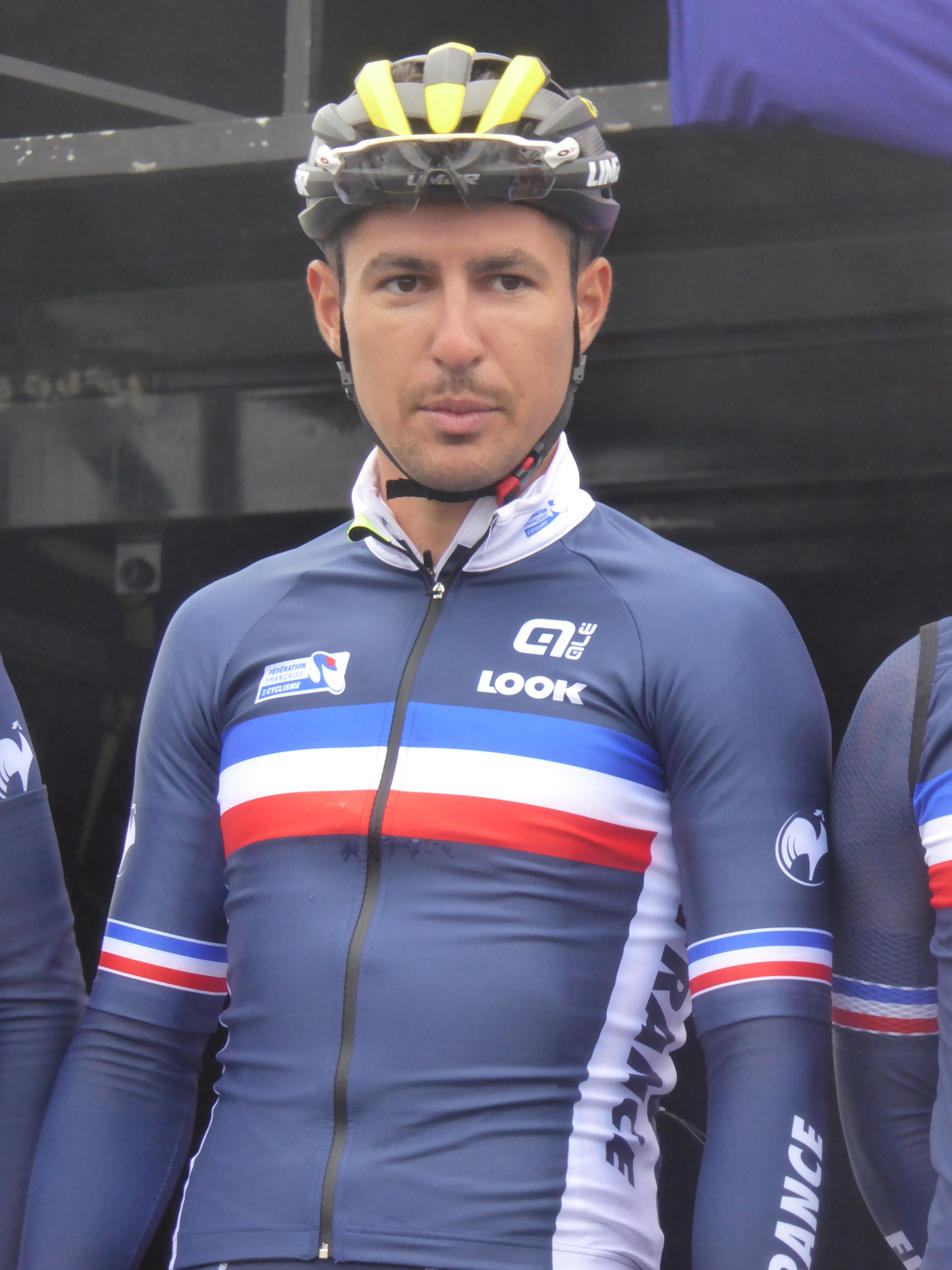
- Tulik at the 2018 European Road Cycling Championships

Personal information
- Full name: Angelo Tulik
- Born: 2 December 1990 (age 35) Moulins, France

Cycling career
- Sport: Cycling
- Current team: Retired
- Discipline: Road
- Role: Rider
- Rider type: Sprinter

Amateur team
- 2009–2011: Vendée U

Professional team
- 2012–2019: Team Europcar

Angelo Tulik (born 2 December 1990) is a French former professional cyclist, who rode professionally between 2012 and 2019, entirely for Team Europcar and its later iterations.

During his professional career, Tulik took two victories – the fourth stage of the 2013 Tour des Fjords, and the 2014 La Roue Tourangelle one-day race – and competed in four Grand Tours.

== Major results ==
2010
8th Overall Thüringen Rundfahrt der U23
2011
1st Stage 8 Vuelta Ciclista de Chile
3rd Paris–Tours Espoirs
4th Val d'Ille Classic
2012
1st Stage 4 Rhône-Alpes Isère Tour
4th Overall Boucles de la Mayenne

1st Young rider classification

2013
1st Stage 4 Tour des Fjords
6th Trofeo Alcúdia
9th Overall Ronde de l'Oise
10th La Roue Tourangelle
2014
1st La Roue Tourangelle
2nd Tour du Doubs
10th Overall Tour de l'Eurométropole
2015
6th Trofeo Laigueglia
2018
6th Overall Tour de Luxembourg
2019
4th Road race, National Road Championships

=== Grand Tour general classification results timeline ===
Grand Tour	2014	2015	2016	2017
Giro d'Italia	123	—	—	—
Tour de France	—	91	DNF	89
Vuelta a España	—	—	—	—

Legend
—	Did not compete
DNF	Did not finish
