= Portuguese Cycling Federation =

National governing body of cycle racing in Portugal

UVP-FPC logo

The Portuguese Cycling Federation or UVP-FPC (in Portuguese: [União Velocipédica Portuguesa] Federação Portuguesa de Ciclismo) is the national governing body of cycle racing in Portugal.

It is the oldest sports federation in Portugal, created in December 14, 1899.

The UVP-FPC is a member of the Union Cycliste Internationale and the Union Européenne de Cyclisme.
