= Edgar Pinto =

Portuguese cyclist (born 1985)

Personal information
- Full name: Edgar Miguel Lemos Pinto
- Born: 27 August 1985 (age 41)
- Height: 1.75 m (5 ft 9 in)
- Weight: 58 kg (128 lb)

Cycling career
- Sport: Cycling
- Discipline: Road
- Role: Rider

Amateur teams
- 2004: Sport de São João de Vêr
- 2005–2006: Santa Maria da Feira–E. Leclerc
- 2007: Benfica Sub-23

Professional teams
- 2008: Benfica
- 2009: Liberty Seguros
- 2010–2014: LA Alumínios–Rota dos Móveis
- 2015–2016: Skydive Dubai–Al Ahli
- 2017: LA Alumínios / Metalusa Blackjack
- 2018: Vito–Feirense–BlackJack
- 2019–2020: W52 / FC Porto

Edgar Miguel Lemos Pinto (born 27 August 1985) is a Portuguese cyclist, who most recently rode for UCI Continental team W52 / FC Porto.

== Major results ==
2008
8th Clásica de Almería
2009
4th Overall GP Internacional Paredes Rota dos Móveis
2012
3rd Road race, National Road Championships
9th Overall Troféu Joaquim Agostinho
2013
2nd Overall Troféu Joaquim Agostinho

1st Points classification

4th Overall Volta a Portugal
2014
3rd Overall Troféu Joaquim Agostinho

1st Stage 1

4th Overall Volta ao Alentejo
5th Overall Volta a Portugal

1st Stage 4

7th Overall Vuelta a Castilla y León
10th Overall Volta ao Algarve
2015
4th Overall Tour de Ijen
5th Overall La Tropicale Amissa Bongo
6th Overall Tour du Maroc

1st Mountains classification
1st Stage 3

2016
3rd Overall Volta Internacional Cova da Beira
2017
7th Overall Volta ao Alentejo
8th Clássica Aldeias do Xisto
9th Overall Troféu Joaquim Agostinho
10th Overall Volta ao Algarve
2018
1st Overall Vuelta a la Comunidad de Madrid

1st Stage 1

1st Stage 4 Volta ao Alentejo
4th Overall Volta a Portugal
6th Overall GP Nacional 2 de Portugal
2019
4th Overall Vuelta a Asturias

1st Stage 3

5th Overall Tour of Turkey
5th Overall Vuelta a Aragón
5th Overall Volta a Portugal
10th Overall Danmark Rundt
