= Carlos Baltazar =

Mexican footballer (born 1997)

Personal information
- Full name: Carlos Alberto Baltazar Agraz
- Date of birth: 24 February 1997 (age 29)
- Place of birth: Guadalajara, Jalisco, Mexico
- Height: 1.71 m (5 ft 7 in)
- Position: Attacking midfielder

Team information
- Current team: Puebla
- Number: 22

Youth career
- 2013–2014: Atotonilco F.C.
- 2014–2017: UdeG

Senior career*
| Years | Team | Apps | (Gls) |
| 2018–2022 | UdeG | 120 | (7) |
| 2023– | Puebla | 55 | (6) |
| 2024–2025 | → Celaya (loan) | 36 | (11) |
- * Club domestic league appearances and goals as of 20 November 2026 ‡ National team caps and goals as of 12 March 2022

Carlos Alberto Baltazar Agraz (born 24 February 1997) is a Mexican professional footballer who plays as an attacking midfielder for Liga MX side Puebla.

== Career ==
In 2018, Baltazar started his career in UdeG. In 2023, he was transferred to Puebla. In 2024, he was loaned to Celaya.

== Career statistics ==
=== Club ===
As of match played on 20 November 2026

Appearances and goals by club, season and competition
| Club | Season | League | | | Cup | | Continental | | Other | | Total | |
| Club | Season | Division | Apps | Goals | Apps | Goals | Apps | Goals | Apps | Goals | Apps | Goals |
|---|---|---|---|---|---|---|---|---|---|---|---|---|
| UdeG | 2018–19 | Ascenso MX | 20 | 1 | 4 | 1 | — | | — | | 24 | 2 |
| UdeG | 2019–20 | Ascenso MX | 17 | 1 | 1 | 0 | — | | — | | 18 | 1 |
| UdeG | 2020–21 | Liga de Expansión MX | 27 | 2 | — | | — | | — | | 27 | 2 |
| UdeG | 2021–22 | Liga de Expansión MX | 36 | 3 | — | | — | | — | | 36 | 3 |
| UdeG | 2022–23 | Liga de Expansión MX | 20 | 0 | — | | — | | — | | 20 | 0 |
| UdeG | Total | | 120 | 7 | 5 | 1 | — | | — | | 125 | 8 |
| Puebla | 2022–23 | Liga MX | 2 | 0 | — | | — | | — | | 2 | 0 |
| Puebla | 2023–24 | Liga MX | 18 | 1 | — | | — | | 1 (Note: Appearances in Leagues Cup) | 0 | 19 | 1 |
| Puebla | 2025–26 | Liga MX | 23 | 4 | — | | — | | 1 | 0 | 24 | 4 |
| Puebla | 2026–27 | Liga MX | 12 | 1 | — | | — | | 1 | 0 | 13 | 1 |
| Puebla | Total | | 55 | 6 | — | | — | | 3 | 0 | 58 | 6 |
| Celaya (loan) | 2024–25 | Liga de Expansión MX | 36 | 11 | — | | — | | — | | 36 | 11 |
| Career total | | | 211 | 24 | 5 | 1 | — | | 3 | 0 | 219 | 25 |
