= David Belda =

Spanish bicycle racer

Personal information
- Full name: David Belda García
- Born: March 18, 1983 (age 43) Cocentaina, Spain
- Height: 1.63 m (5 ft 4 in)
- Weight: 53 kg (117 lb)

Cycling career
- Sport: Cycling
- Discipline: Road
- Role: Rider

Amateur teams
- 2002–2006: Kelme–Costa Blanca Amateur
- 2010: Asfaltos Guerola–CA Valencia Terra i Mar

Professional teams
- 2007–2008: Fuerteventura–Canarias
- 2009: Boyacá Orgullo de América
- 2011–2015: Burgos 2016–Castilla y León
- 2016: Team Roth
- 2017: Burgos BH

David Belda García (born March 18, 1983, in Cocentaina) is a Spanish professional cyclist, who last rode for UCI Continental team Burgos BH. In May 2017, Belda recorded a positive drugs test for erythropoietin (EPO) in an out-of-competition control. The following December, he was given a backdated four-year ban until November 2021.

== Personal life ==
He is the son of Vicente Belda, who also competed professionally as a cyclist, winning stages at the Giro d'Italia and the Vuelta a España.

== Major results ==
2005
9th Overall Vuelta Ciclista a León
2008
1st Aiztondo Klasica
1st Memorial Valenciaga
1st Vuelta a Zamora
1st Stage 1 (TTT) Vuelta a Tenerife
3rd Overall Vuelta Ciclista a León
2009
1st Overall Vuelta Ciclista a León

1st Stage 1

2010
2nd Overall Cinturón a Mallorca

1st Stage 3

4th Overall Vuelta Ciclista a León

1st Stage 3

2011
1st Stage 2 Mi-Août Bretonne
4th Overall Troféu Joaquim Agostinho
2013
9th Overall Tour of Qinghai Lake
2014
1st Overall Vuelta a Castilla y León

1st Stage 2

Volta a Portugal

1st Stages 3 & 5

2nd Tour du Jura
3rd Klasika Primavera
6th Overall Vuelta Mexico Telmex
6th Prueba Villafranca de Ordizia
2015
1st Overall Tour des Pays de Savoie

1st Points classification
1st Stage 1

1st Stage 4 Rhône-Alpes Isère Tour
7th Prueba Villafranca de Ordizia
2016
5th Prueba Villafranca de Ordizia
9th Overall Tour of Austria
2017
5th Trofeo Pollenca-Port de Andratx
7th Trofeo Serra de Tramuntana
