= Luís Afonso (cyclist) =

Portuguese road cyclist

Personal information
- Full name: Luís Filipe Correia Afonso
- Born: 14 January 1990 (age 36) Travanca

Cycling career
- Sport: Cycling
- Disciplines: Track; Road
- Role: Rider

Amateur teams
- 2005–2008: Silva e Vinha–ADRAP
- 2009–2010: Aluvia–Valongo
- 2011–2012: Liberty Seguros–Santa Maria da Feira
- 2012: LA–Antarte (stagiaire)

Professional teams
- 2013–2017: LA Alumínios–Antarte
- 2018–2019: Vito–Feirense–BlackJack

Luís Filipe Correia Afonso (born 14 January 1990) is a Portuguese road cyclist, who last rode for UCI Continental team Vito–Feirense–PNB.

== Major results ==
2011
6th Overall Grande Prémio Crédito Agrícola de Costa Azul
