= Vuelta Ciclista a León =

Spanish bicycling competition

Race details
- Date: Early August
- Region: León, Spain
- English name: Tour of León
- Local name: La Vuelta León (in Spanish)
- Discipline: Road
- Competition: UCI Europe Tour
- Type: Stage-race
- Web site: www.vueltaciclistaleon.com

History
- Editions: 30 (as of 2019)
- Most recent: Alessandro Fancellu (ITA)

Vuelta Ciclista a León, also known as La Vuelta León, is a former road bicycle race held annually in the province of León in Spain. From 2005 until 2013 it was organised as a 2.2 event on the professional UCI Europe Tour. The other editions were amateur races.

== Winners ==
Year	Country	Rider	Team
2001	Spain	Egoi Martínez	Caja Rural
2002	Spain	Francisco Palacio	Agua de Mondariz
2003	Spain	Javier Ramírez	Avila Rojas
2004	Spain	Victor García	Alfus Tedes
2005	Spain	Enrique Salgueiro	Spiuk
2006	Spain	José Antonio Carrasco	Alfus Tedes-Garbialdi
2007	Japan	Miyataka Shimizu	Nippo Corporation-Meitan Hompo Co. LTD-Asada
2008	Netherlands	Wout Poels	P3 Transfer-Batavus
2009	Spain	David Belda	Boyacá es Para Vivirla
2010	Spain	Angel Vallejo	Supermercados Froiz
2011	Netherlands	Marc Goos	Rabobank Continental Team
2012	Spain	José Belda	GSport-Valencia Terra i Mar
2013	Spain	Jordi Simón	Coluer Bikes
2014	Spain	Aritz Bagües	Gipuzkoa–Oreki
2015	Spain	Cristián Rodríguez	Caja Rural–Seguros RGA amateur
2016	Chile	Wolfgang Burmann	Kuota-Paulino
2017	South Africa	Willie Smit	Rías Baixas
2018	Spain	Óscar González Brea	GD Supermercados Froiz
2019	Italy	Alessandro Fancellu	Kometa U23
