= W52–FC Porto =

Portuguese cycling team

Team information
- UCI code: W52
- Registered: Portugal
- Founded: 2004
- Disbanded: 2022
- Discipline: Road
- Status: Amateur (2004–2012); UCI Continental (2013–2018, 2020–2022); UCI Professional Continental (2019)
- Bicycles: SwiftCarbon
- Website: Team home page

Key personnel
- General manager: Adriano Sousa
- Team managers: Nuno Ribeiro; Hélder Alves

Team name history
- 2004–2005 2006–2007 2008 2009–2010 2011 2012 2013–2014 2015 2016 2017 2018–2022: Casactiva–Quinta das Arcas–UCS; Casactiva–Quinta das Arcas–Madeilongo–UCS; Casactiva–Quinta das Arcas–Aluvia; Aluvia–Valongo; Pauperval–Estanhos Dom António–Valongo; OFM/Valongo; OFM–Quinta da Lixa–Goldentimes; W52–Quinta da Lixa; W52–FC Porto–Porto Canal; W52–FC Porto–Mestre da Cor; W52–FC Porto

W52–FC Porto (UCI team code: W52) was a professional road bicycle racing team, which participated in UCI Continental Circuits races before a doping scandal. This team is based in Felgueiras, Portugal, its title sponsors are clothing brand W52, and sports club FC Porto.

Founded in 2004, the team spent the first eight years competing at youth level (up to under-23) until it was registered as a UCI Continental team in 2013, under the commercial designation of OFM–Quinta da Lixa–Goldentimes. That year, the team competed for the first time in the Volta a Portugal, where it won three stages and, through Alejandro Marque, the general classification. The team won the general classification in the following four editions – through Gustavo César (2), Rui Vinhas and João Rodrigues – and added victories in the team classification.

In 2022, the team's sports license was revoked by UCI for doping, with seven cyclists being suspended from three to seven years. The team's assistant sports director, José Rodrigues, received a 25-year suspension by ADoP.

== Doping scandal ==
In March 2021, W52–FC Porto's rider Raúl Alarcón had 19 victories stripped for doping, including two wins at Volta a Portugal. In April 2022, twelve cyclists of W52–FC Porto were made arguidos (formal suspects) in relation to a doping scandal. Later in July, eight cyclists and two mechanics were suspended for 120 days by ADoP, with the UCI revoking the team's sports license days later, thus excluding W52–FC Porto from the 2022 Volta a Portugal.

On 4 October 2022, seven W52–FC Porto riders were banned for doping: João Rodrigues, for a total of seven years, Rui Vinhas, Ricardo Mestre, Ricardo Vilela, Daniel Mestre, José Neves, and Samuel Caldeira, for three years each.

== Team roster ==
As of 11 February 2022.

Rider	Date of birth
Amaro Antunes (POR)	27 November 1990 (age 35)
Joni Brandão (POR)	20 November 1989 (age 36)
Samuel Caldeira (POR)	30 November 1985 (age 40)
José Fernandes (POR)	30 October 1995 (age 30)
José Gonçalves (POR)	13 February 1989 (age 37)
Jorge Magalhães (POR)	10 February 1997 (age 29)

Rider	Date of birth
Daniel Mestre (POR)	1 April 1986 (age 40)
Ricardo Mestre (POR)	11 September 1983 (age 42)
Guilherme Mota (POR)	12 July 2000 (age 26)
João Rodrigues (POR)	15 November 1994 (age 31)
Ricardo Vilela (POR)	18 December 1987 (age 38)
Rui Vinhas (POR)	6 December 1986 (age 39)

== Major wins ==
2004
Overall Troféu RTP, Gilberto Sampaio
2009
Overall Volta à Madeira, Bruno Silva

Prologue, Team time trial
Stages 1, 2 & 4, Bruno Silva
Stage 3, Luís Afonso
Stage 5, Jorge Silva

Overall Troféu RTP, Carlos Baltazar
Overall Troféu RTP Jocilma/Ribeiro da Silva/Cidade de Lordelo, Carlos Baltazar
Overall Troféu RTP Município de Valongo, Carlos Baltazar
Overall Volta a Portugal do Futuro, Marco Cunha

Stages 2, 3 & 4, Marco Cunha
Stage 5 Carlos Baltazar

2010
Stages 2 & 3 Volta a Portugal do Futuro, Bruno Silva
Overall Volta a Albergaria, Francisco Costa
2013
Overall Grande Prémio Liberty Seguros, Delio Fernandez
Overall Troféu Joaquim Agostinho, Eduard Prades

Stage 3, Eduard Prades

Overall Volta a Portugal, Alejandro Marque

Stage 3, Delio Fernandez
Stage 8, Gustavo Veloso
Stage 9 (ITT), Alejandro Marque

2014
Stage 2 Volta ao Alentejo, Eduard Prades
Stage 5 Volta ao Alentejo, Samuel Caldeira
Overall Troféu Joaquim Agostinho, Delio Fernandez
Overall Volta a Portugal, Gustavo Veloso

Stage 9 (ITT), Gustavo Veloso

2015
Overall Volta a Portugal, Gustavo Veloso

Stages 2 & 7, Delio Fernández
Stages 6 & 9, Gustavo Veloso

Overall Tour do Rio, Gustavo Veloso

Stage 2, Gustavo Veloso

2016
Overall Volta a Portugal, Rui Vinhas

Prologue, Rafael Reis
Stages 4, 6 & 10, Gustavo Veloso

2017
~~Stage 5 Volta ao Algarve, Amaro Antunes~~
~~Overall Vuelta a Asturias, Raúl Alarcón~~

~~Stage 3, Raúl Alarcón~~

~~Stage 1 Vuelta Ciclista Comunidad de Madrid, Raúl Alarcón~~
~~Stage 3 GP Beiras e Serra da Estrela, Raúl Alarcón~~
~~Overall Troféu Joaquim Agostinho, Amaro Antunes~~

~~Stage 2, Amaro Antunes~~

~~Overall Volta a Portugal, Raúl Alarcón~~

~~Stages 1 & 4, Raúl Alarcón~~
Stage 2, Samuel Caldeira
Stages 5 & 10 (ITT), Gustavo Veloso
Stage 9, Amaro Antunes

2018
Stage 5 (ITT) Volta ao Alentejo, Gustavo Veloso
Stage 2 GP Beiras e Serra da Estrela, César Fonte
Stage 3 Vuelta a Asturias, Ricardo Mestre
Troféu Joaquim Agostinho, José Fernandes
~~Overall Grande Prémio de Portugal N2, Raúl Alarcón~~

~~Stage 1, Raúl Alarcón~~

~~Overall Volta a Portugal, Raúl Alarcón~~

~~Stages 3, 4 & 9, Raúl Alarcón~~

2019
Overall Volta ao Alentejo, João Rodrigues

Stage 5 (ITT), João Rodrigues

GP Beiras e Serra da Estrela, Daniel Mestre
Stage 3 Vuelta a Asturias, Edgar Pinto
Prologue GP Internacional Torres Vedras, Gustavo César
Overall Volta a Portugal, João Rodrigues

Prologue, Samuel Caldeira
Stage 3, Daniel Mestre
Stage 4 & 10 (ITT), João Rodrigues
Stage 9, António Carvalho

2020
Overall Volta a Portugal, Amaro Antunes

Prologue & Stage 8 (ITT), Gustavo César
Stage 2, Amaro Antunes

2021
Overall Volta ao Algarve, João Rodrigues
Portugal Road Race Championships, José Fernandes
Stage 4 Volta ao Alentejo, Daniel Mestre
Stage 3 Troféu Joaquim Agostinho, José Fernandes
~~Overall Volta a Portugal, Amaro Antunes~~

== National Championships ==
2021
Portuguese National Road Race, José Fernandes

== See also ==
- Doping in sport
- List of doping cases in cycling
