= Samuel Caldeira =

Portuguese bicycle racer

Personal information
- Full name: Samuel José Rodrigues Caldeira
- Born: 30 November 1985 (age 40) Faro, Portugal
- Height: 1.80 m (5 ft 11 in)
- Weight: 76 kg (168 lb)

Cycling career
- Sport: Cycling
- Current team: Suspended
- Discipline: Road
- Role: Rider

Amateur teams
- 2004: CC Tavira
- 2005: CC Loulé–Jardim Hotel–Euroaço

Professional teams
- 2006–2012: Duja–Tavira
- 2013–2022: OFM–Quinta da Lixa

Samuel José Rodrigues Caldeira (born 30 November 1985) is a Portuguese cyclist who last rode for UCI Continental team W52 / FC Porto.

On 4 October 2022, he received a three-year ban by the UCI for doping.

== Major results ==
2007
8th Overall Vuelta a Extremadura
2010
1st Overall Grande Prémio Crédito Agrícola de Costa Azul

1st Stages 1 & 3

2011
2nd Overall Grande Prémio Crédito Agrícola de Costa Azul
3rd Overall GP Liberty Seguros
4th Overall Volta ao Alentejo
2012
3rd Overall Volta ao Alentejo

1st Points classification

9th Overall Tour of Taihu Lake
2014
1st Stage 5 Volta ao Alentejo
2015
4th Overall Volta ao Alentejo

1st Points classification

6th Overall GP Liberty Seguros
6th Clássica Loulé
2016
4th Vuelta a La Rioja
7th Overall GP Liberty Seguros
9th Overall Volta ao Alentejo
2017
1st Stage 2 Volta a Portugal
2019
1st Prologue Volta a Portugal
7th Fyen Rundt

== See also ==
- Doping in sport
- List of doping cases in cycling
