= 2014 Caja Rural–Seguros RGA season =

2014 Caja Rural–Seguros RGA season
Manager	Eugenio Goikoetxea
One-day victories	1
Stage race overall victories	1
Stage race stage victories	3
Previous season • Next season

The 2014 season for the Caja Rural–Seguros RGA cycling team began in January at the La Tropicale Amissa Bongo. The team participated in UCI Europe Tour races and UCI World Tour events when given a wildcard invitation.

== 2014 roster ==
All ages are as of 1 January 2014, the first day of the 2014 season.

As of 5 January 2014.

Rider	Date of birth
Javier Aramendia (ESP)	5 December 1986 (aged 27)
David Arroyo (ESP)	7 January 1980 (aged 33)
Pello Bilbao (ESP)	25 February 1990 (aged 23)
Karol Domagalski (POL)	9 August 1989 (aged 24)
Ramón Domene (ESP)	2 January 1990 (aged 23)
Rubén Fernández (ESP)	1 March 1991 (aged 22)
Fabricio Ferrari (URU)	3 June 1985 (aged 28)
Omar Fraile (ESP)	17 July 1990 (aged 23)
Marcos García (ESP)	4 December 1986 (aged 27)
Fernando Grijalba (ESP)	14 January 1991 (aged 22)

Rider	Date of birth
Francesco Lasca (ITA)	29 March 1988 (aged 25)
Ángel Madrazo (ESP)	30 July 1988 (aged 25)
Lluís Mas (ESP)	15 October 1989 (aged 24)
Antonio Molina (ESP)	4 January 1991 (aged 22)
Heiner Parra (COL)	9 October 1991 (aged 22)
Antonio Piedra (ESP)	10 January 1985 (aged 28)
Luis León Sánchez (ESP)	24 November 1983 (aged 30)
Amets Txurruka (ESP)	10 November 1982 (aged 31)
Iván Velasco (ESP)	8 February 1980 (aged 33)
Davide Viganò (ITA)	12 June 1984 (aged 29)

Riders who joined the team for the 2014 season

Rider	2013 team
Pello Bilbao	Euskaltel–Euskadi
Fernando Grijalba	neo-pro (Caja Rural Sub-23)
Ángel Madrazo	Movistar Team
Lluís Mas	neo-pro (Burgos BH)
Antonio Molina	neo-pro (Caja Rural Sub-23)
Heiner Parra	neo-pro (4-72 Colombia)
Luis León Sánchez	Belkin Pro Cycling
Davide Viganò	Lampre–Merida

Riders who left the team during or after the 2013 season

Rider	2014 team
André Cardoso	Garmin–Sharp
Manuel Antonio Cardoso	Banco BIC–Carmim
Yelko Gomez	
Francisco Javier Moreno	Louletano-Dunas Douradas
Enzo Josue Moyano	San Luis Somos Todos
Danail Petrov	

== Season victories ==
Date	Race	Competition	Rider	Country	Location
13 January	La Tropicale Amissa Bongo, Stage 1	UCI Africa Tour	Luis León Sánchez (ESP)	Cameroon	Ebolowa
12 April	Tour of the Basque Country, Sprints classification	UCI World Tour	Omar Fraile (ESP)	Spain	
13 April	Klasika Primavera	UCI Europe Tour	Pello Bilbao (ESP)	Spain	Amorebieta
18 May	Vuelta a Castilla y León, Stage 3	UCI Europe Tour	Luis León Sánchez (ESP)	Spain	Bembibre
18 May	Vuelta a Castilla y León, Teams classification	UCI Europe Tour	(Note: The riders on the squad were Luis León Sánchez, David Arroyo, Francesco Lasca, Amets Txurruka, Antonio Piedra, Marcos García, Fernando Grijalba, and Fabricio Ferrari)	Spain	
1 June	Tour des Fjords, Mountains classification	UCI Europe Tour	Amets Txurruka (ESP)	Norway	
1 August	Volta a Portugal, Stage 2	UCI Europe Tour	Davide Viganò (ITA)	Portugal	Braga
10 August	Volta a Portugal, Points classification	UCI Europe Tour	Davide Viganò (ITA)	Portugal	
17 August	Vuelta a Burgos, Sprints classification	UCI Europe Tour	Lluís Mas (ESP)	Spain	
14 September	Vuelta a España, Mountains classification	UCI World Tour	Luis León Sánchez (ESP)	Spain	
28 September	Tour du Gévaudan Languedoc-Roussillon, Overall	UCI Europe Tour	Amets Txurruka (ESP)	France	
28 September	Tour du Gévaudan Languedoc-Roussillon, Mountains classification	UCI Europe Tour	Ángel Madrazo (ESP)	France	
28 September	Tour du Gévaudan Languedoc-Roussillon, Teams classification	UCI Europe Tour	(Note: The riders on the squad were David Arroyo, Javier Aramendia, Amets Txurruka, Pello Bilbao, Antonio Molina, Fernando Grijalba, Ángel Madrazo, and Marcos García)	France	
