= 2015 Caja Rural–Seguros RGA season =

Caja Rural–Seguros RGA
- 2015 season
- UCI code: CJR
- Status: UCI Professional Continental
- Manager: Eugenio Goikoetxea
- Main sponsor(s): Grupo Caja Rural & Seguros RGA
- Based: Spain
- Bicycles: Fuji

Season victories
- One-day races: 4
- Stage race overall: 1
- Stage race stages: 12

The 2015 season for the Caja Rural–Seguros RGA cycling team began in January at the Trofeo Santanyi–Ses Salines–Campos. The team participated in UCI Europe Tour races and UCI World Tour events when given a wildcard invitation.

== 2015 roster ==
Rider	Date of birth
Javier Aramendia (ESP)	5 December 1986 (age 39)
David Arroyo (ESP)	7 January 1980 (age 46)
Carlos Barbero (ESP)	29 April 1991 (age 35)
Miguel Angel Benito (ESP)	21 September 1993 (age 32)
Pello Bilbao (ESP)	25 February 1990 (age 36)
Hugh Carthy (GBR)	9 July 1994 (age 32)
Fabricio Ferrari (URU)	3 June 1985 (age 41)
Omar Fraile (ESP)	17 July 1990 (age 36)
José Gonçalves (POR)	13 February 1989 (age 37)
Fernando Grijalba (ESP)	14 January 1991 (age 35)

Rider	Date of birth
Francesco Lasca (ITA)	29 March 1988 (age 38)
Ángel Madrazo (ESP)	30 July 1988 (age 38)
Lluís Mas (ESP)	15 October 1989 (age 36)
Antonio Molina (ESP)	4 January 1991 (age 35)
Sergio Pardilla (ESP)	16 January 1984 (age 42)
Heiner Parra (COL)	9 October 1991 (age 34)
Eduard Prades (ESP)	9 August 1987 (age 39)
Amets Txurruka (ESP)	10 November 1982 (age 43)
Ricardo Vilela (POR)	18 December 1987 (age 38)

Riders who joined the team for the 2015 season

Rider	2014 team
Carlos Barbero	neo-pro (Euskadi)
Miguel Angel Benito	neo-pro (Caja Rural Sub-23)
Hugh Carthy	Rapha Condor JLT
José Gonçalves	neo-pro (La Pomme Marseille 13)
Sergio Pardilla	MTN–Qhubeka
Eduard Prades	neo-pro (Matrix Powertag)
Ricardo Vilela	neo-pro (OFM-Quinta da Lixa)

Riders who left the team during or after the 2014 season

Rider	2015 team
Karol Domagalski	Team Raleigh
Ramon Domene	
Rubén Fernández	Movistar Team
Marcos García	Louletano-Duras Douradas
Antonio Piedra	
Luis León Sánchez	Astana
Davide Viganò	Team Idea

== Season victories ==
Date	Race	Competition	Rider	Country	Location
22 February	Vuelta a Andalucía, Mountains classification	UCI Europe Tour	Pello Bilbao (ESP)	Spain	
29 March	Volta a Catalunya, Sprints classification	UCI World Tour	Lluís Mas (ESP)	Spain	
11 April	Tour of the Basque Country, Mountains classification	UCI World Tour	Omar Fraile (ESP)	Spain	
17 April	Vuelta a Castilla y León, Stage 1	UCI Europe Tour	Pello Bilbao (ESP)	Spain	Alba de Tormes
19 April	Vuelta a Castilla y León, Points classification	UCI Europe Tour	Pello Bilbao (ESP)	Spain	
26 April	Giro dell'Appennino	UCI Europe Tour	Omar Fraile (ESP)	Italy	Genoa
1 May	Tour of Turkey, Stage 6	UCI Europe Tour	Pello Bilbao (ESP)	Turkey	Selçuk
3 May	Tour of Turkey, Stage 8	UCI Europe Tour	Lluís Mas (ESP)	Turkey	Istanbul
3 May	Tour of Turkey, Sprints classification	UCI Europe Tour	Lluís Mas (ESP)	Turkey	
3 May	Tour of Turkey, Teams classification	UCI Europe Tour	(Note: The riders on the squad were Pello Bilbao, Carlos Barbero, Fabricio Ferrari, José Gonçalves, Fernando Grijalba, Lluís Mas, Heiner Parra and Eduard Prades)	Turkey	
9 May	Four Days of Dunkirk, Stage 4	UCI Europe Tour	Omar Fraile (ESP)	France	Cassel
10 May	Vuelta a la Comunidad de Madrid, Stage 2	UCI Europe Tour	Carlos Barbero (ESP)	Spain	El Pardo
10 May	Vuelta a la Comunidad de Madrid, Mountains classification	UCI Europe Tour	Eduard Prades (ESP)	Spain	
23 May	Tour of Norway, Stage 4	UCI Europe Tour	Amets Txurruka (ESP)	Norway	Geilo
31 May	Tour des Fjords, Mountains classification	UCI Europe Tour	Amets Txurruka (ESP)	Norway	
31 May	Tour des Fjords, Teams classification	UCI Europe Tour	(Note: The riders on the squad were Carlos Barbero, Ángel Madrazo, Antonio Molina, Eduard Prades, Amets Txurruka and Ricardo Vilela)	Norway	
7 June	Philadelphia International Championship	UCI America Tour	Carlos Barbero (ESP)	United States	Philadelphia
10 June	Tour de Beauce, Stage 1	UCI America Tour	Carlos Barbero (ESP)	Canada	Saint-Georges
11 June	Tour de Beauce, Stage 2	UCI America Tour	Amets Txurruka (ESP)	Canada	Mont Mégantic
13 June	Tour de Beauce, Stage 4	UCI America Tour	Carlos Barbero (ESP)	Canada	Quebec City
14 June	Tour de Beauce, Overall	UCI America Tour	Pello Bilbao (ESP)	Canada	
14 June	Tour de Beauce, Teams classification	UCI America Tour	(Note: The riders on the squad were Pello Bilbao, Eduard Prades, Carlos Barbero, Amets Txurruka, Fernando Grijalba, Hugh Carthy and Miguel Ángel Benito)	Canada	
25 July	Prueba Villafranca de Ordizia	UCI Europe Tour	Ángel Madrazo (ESP)	Spain	Ordizia
3 August	Volta a Portugal, Stage 5	UCI Europe Tour	José Gonçalves (POR)	Portugal	Viana do Castelo
4 August	Vuelta a Burgos, Stage 1	UCI Europe Tour	Carlos Barbero (ESP)	Spain	Clunia
7 August	Volta a Portugal, Stage 8	UCI Europe Tour	Eduard Prades (ESP)	Portugal	Castelo Branco
13 September	Vuelta a España, Mountains classification	UCI World Tour	Omar Fraile (ESP)	Spain	
27 September	Tour du Gévaudan Languedoc-Roussillon, Mountains classification	UCI Europe Tour	Ángel Madrazo (ESP)	France	
27 September	Tour du Gévaudan Languedoc-Roussillon, Young rider classification	UCI Europe Tour	Hugh Carthy (GBR)	France	
27 September	Tour du Gévaudan Languedoc-Roussillon, Teams classification	UCI Europe Tour	(Note: The riders on the squad were Amets Txurruka, Omar Fraile, Pello Bilbao, Antonio Molina, Heiner Parra, Ángel Madrazo, Hugh Carthy and Eduard Prades)	France	
8 October	Coppa Sabatini	UCI Europe Tour	Eduard Prades (ESP)	Italy	Peccioli
