= Sagebach =

Stream in Germany

Location
- State: North Rhine-Westphalia, Germany
- Reference no.: DE: 2781616

Physical characteristics
- Source
  - location: South of Kempen, Germany
  - coordinates: 51°47′59.57″N 8°56′57.65″E
  - elevation: 356 m above sea level (NN)
- Mouth
  - location: in the centre of Altenbeken into the Beke
  - coordinates: 51°45′48″N 8°56′41″E
  - elevation: 241 m above sea level (NN)
- Length: 4.545 km

Basin features
- Progression: Beke → Lippe → Rhine → North Sea
- River system: Rhein

Sagebach is a stream in North Rhine-Westphalia, Germany. It is 4.5 kilometres long and passes through the Egge Hills. It flows into the Beke in Altenbeken. The stream is in the Landschaftsschutzgebiet Fließgewässer und Auen conservation area.

== See also ==
- List of rivers of North Rhine-Westphalia
