= Störmeder Bach =

River in Germany

Location
- Country: Germany
- State: North Rhine-Westphalia

Physical characteristics
- Source
  - location: East of Geseke, south of Störmede, a district of Geseke
  - coordinates: 51.6274°N 8.4777°E
- Mouth
  - location: Southeast of Verlar, a district of Salzkotten
  - coordinates: 51.6834°N 8.4765°E

Basin features
- Progression: Brandenbaumer Bach→ Lippe→ Rhine→ North Sea
- Tributaries
  - left: Schledde

Störmeder Bach is a river of North Rhine-Westphalia, Germany.

It springs east of Geseke and south of Störmede (a district of Geseke). It is the left headstream of the Brandenbaumer Bach.

== See also ==
- List of rivers of North Rhine-Westphalia
