= Durbeke =

River in North Rhine-Westphalia, Germany

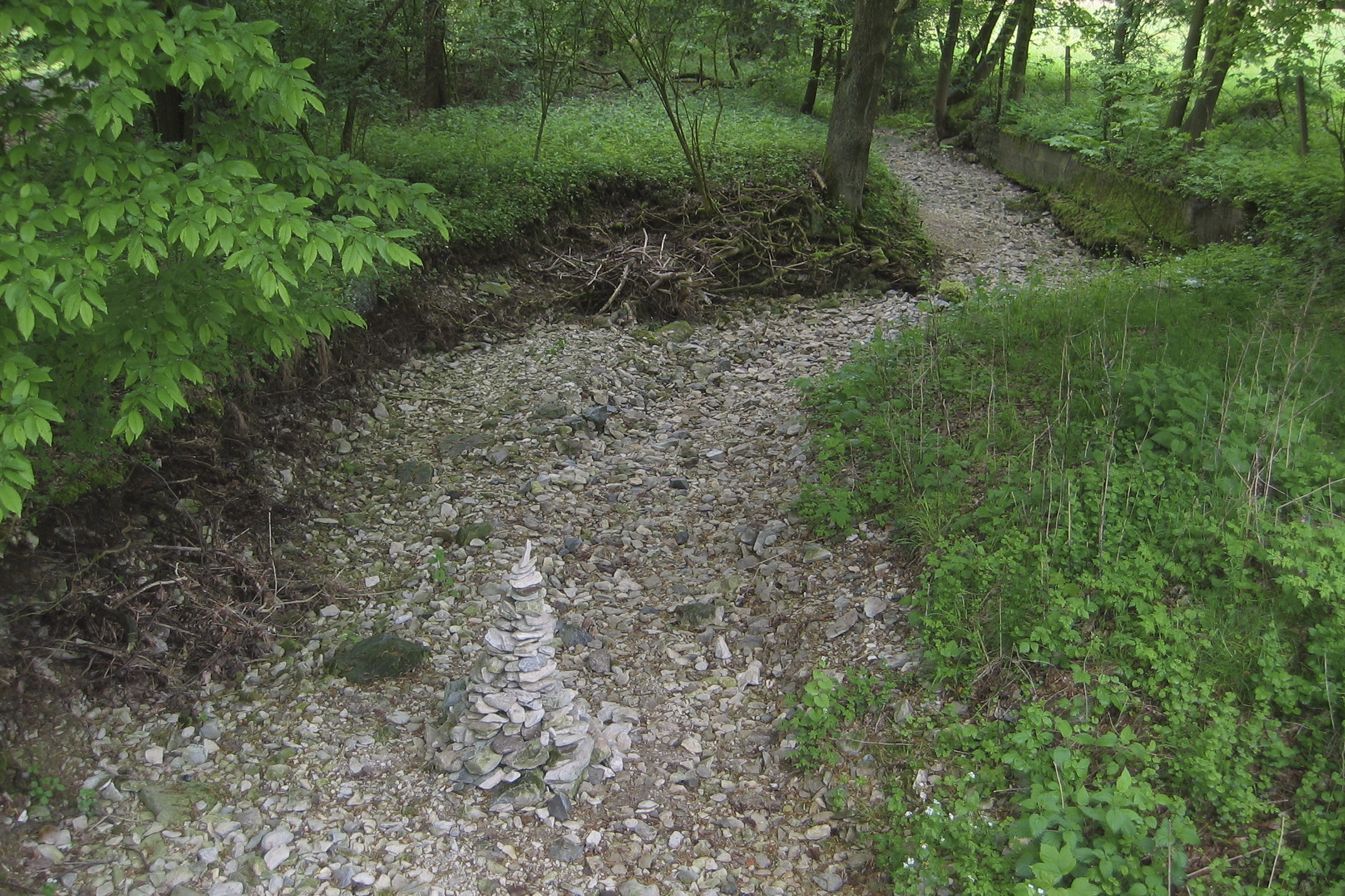

Location
- Country: Germany
- State: North Rhine-Westphalia

Physical characteristics
- Mouth
  - location: Beke
  - coordinates: 51.7584°N 8.9045°E

Basin features
- Progression: Beke→ Lippe→ Rhine→ North Sea

Durbeke is a small river in North Rhine-Westphalia, Germany. It is 8.7 km long and flows into the Beke near Altenbeken.

== See also ==
- List of rivers of North Rhine-Westphalia
