= Geseker Bach =

River in North Rhine-Westphalia, Germany

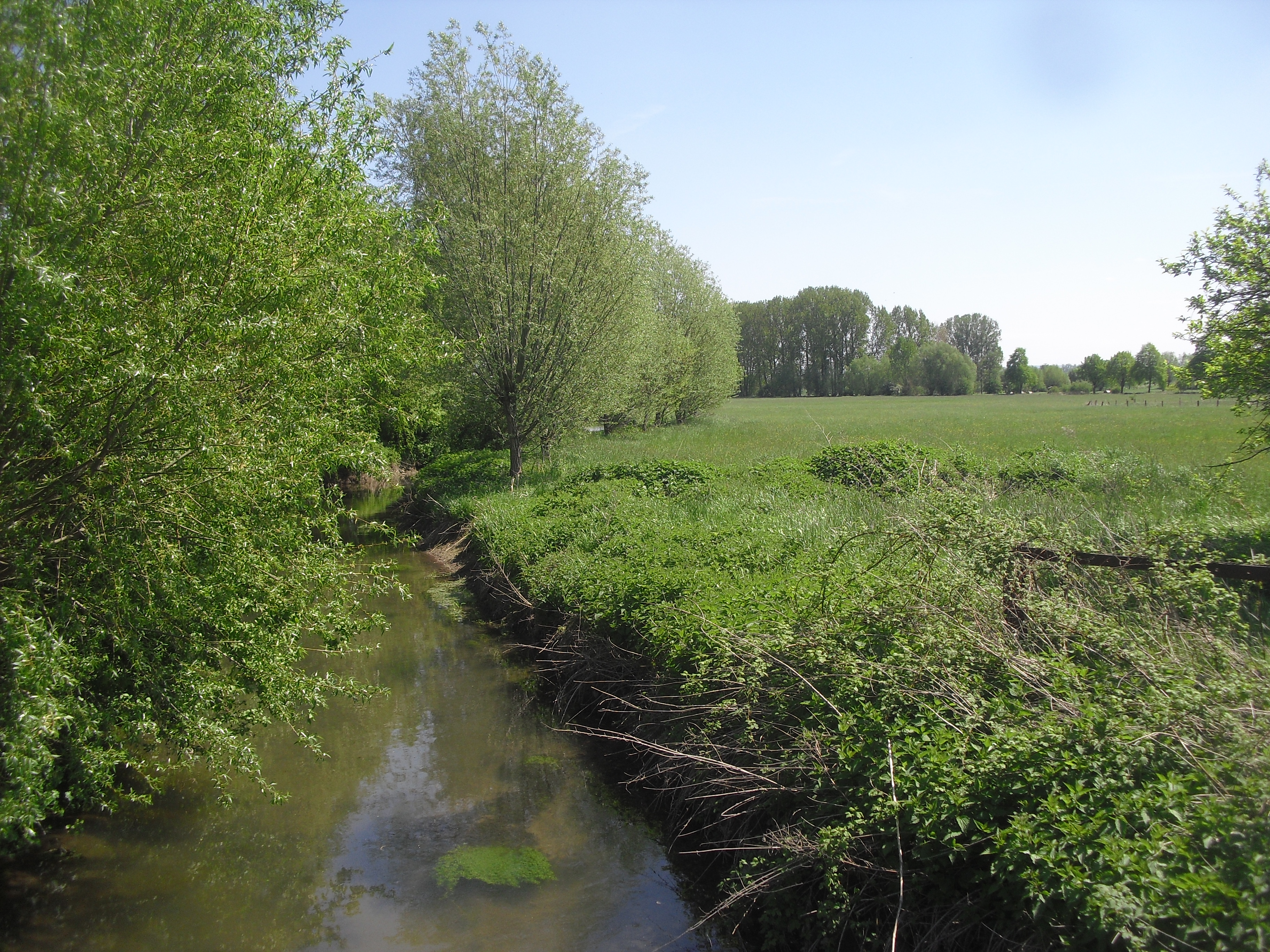

Location
- Country: Germany
- State: North Rhine-Westphalia

Physical characteristics
- Source
  - location: Centre of Geseke
  - coordinates: 51.6385°N 8.5127°E
- Mouth
  - location: Southeast of Verlar, a district of Salzkotten
  - coordinates: 51.6834°N 8.4765°E

Basin features
- Progression: Brandenbaumer Bach→ Lippe→ Rhine→ North Sea

Geseker Bach is a river of North Rhine-Westphalia, Germany.

It springs in the centre of the town Geseke. It is the right headstream of the Brandenbaumer Bach.

== See also ==
- List of rivers of North Rhine-Westphalia
