= Loemühlenbach =

River in Germany

Location
- Country: Germany
- States: North Rhine-Westphalia

Physical characteristics
- Mouth
  - location: Sickingmühlenbach
  - coordinates: 51.6805°N 7.1241°E

Basin features
- Progression: Sickingmühlenbach→ Lippe→ Rhine→ North Sea

Loemühlenbach is a brook in North Rhine-Westphalia, Germany. It is 8.6 km long and flows into the Sickingmühlenbach as a left tributary in the city of Marl.

== See also ==
- List of rivers of North Rhine-Westphalia
