= Heder (Lippe) =

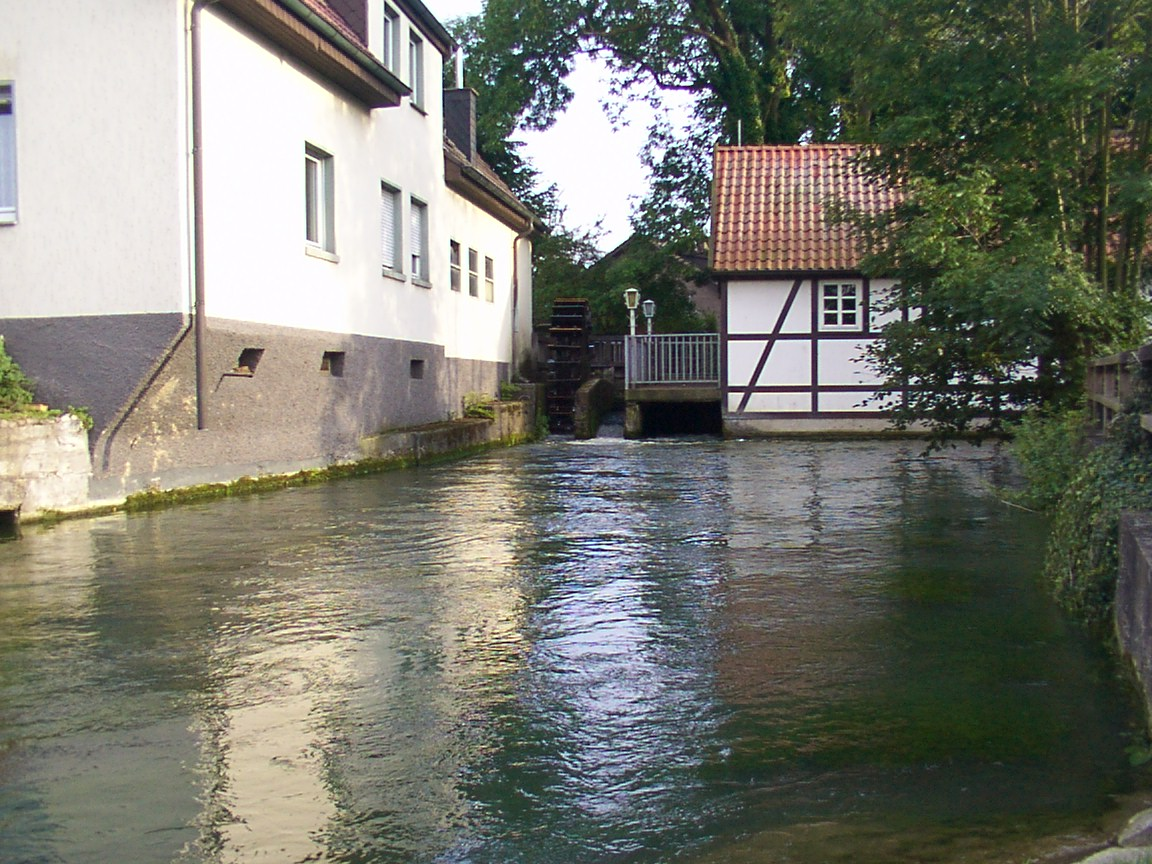
- the Header shortly after her source at Upsprunge (a district of Salzkotten)

Location
- Country: Germany
- State: North Rhine-Westphalia

Physical characteristics
- Source
  - coordinates: 51.6540°N 8.6003°E
- Mouth
  - location: into the Lippe
  - coordinates: 51.7096°N 8.5221°E

Basin features
- Progression: Lippe→ Rhine→ North Sea

Heder is a river of North Rhine-Westphalia, Germany. It springs at Upsprunge (a district of Salzkotten). It is a left tributary of the Lippe in Schwelle (also a district of Salzkotten).

== See also ==
- List of rivers of North Rhine-Westphalia
