= Sybille Krämer =

German philosopher

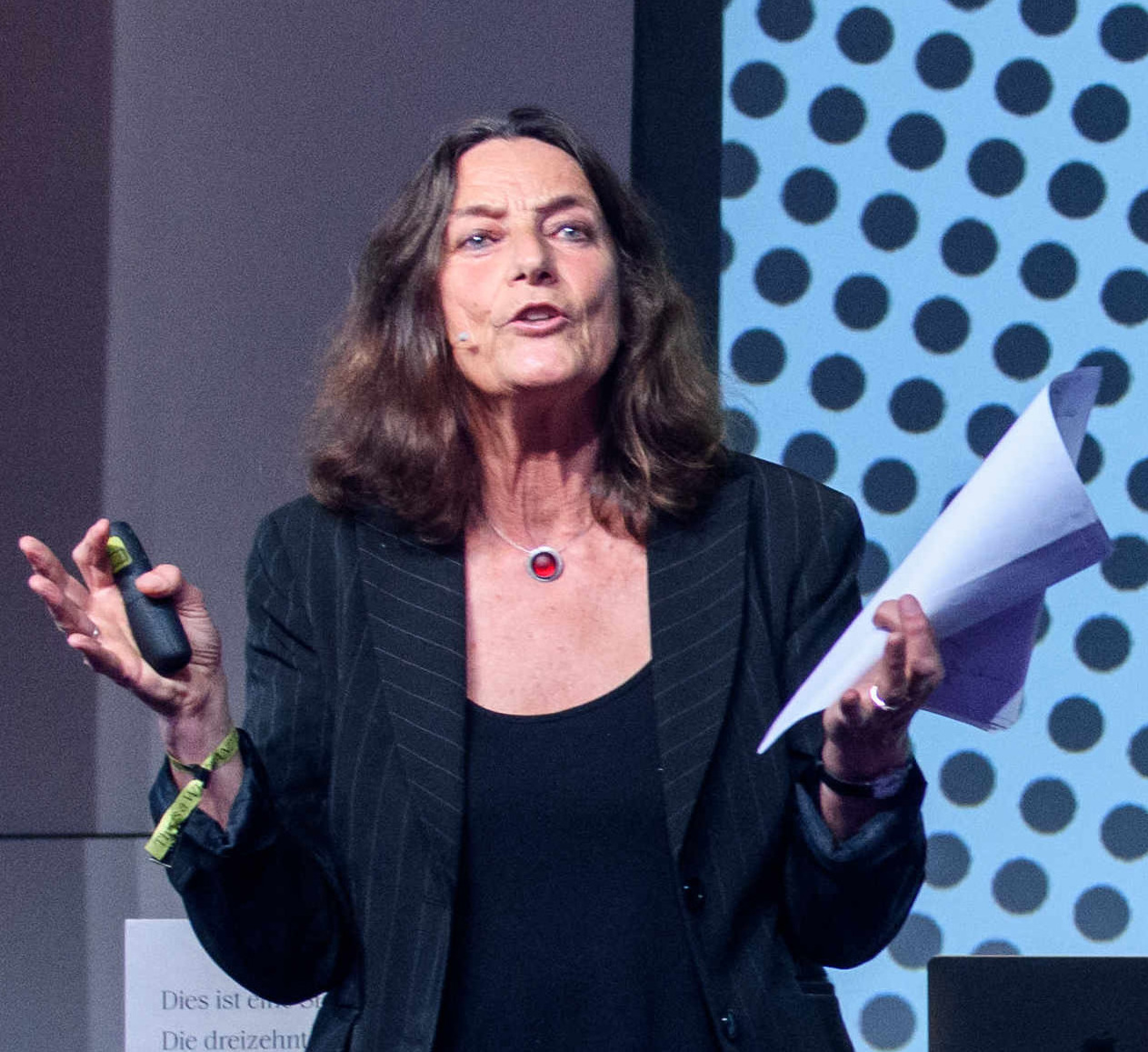

Sybille Krämer (born 1951) is a German philosopher. She held the position of professor at Freie University Berlin from 1989 until 2018. Since March 2019, Krämer serves as a senior professor at Leuphana University Lüneburg.

== Career ==
Krämer studied philosophy, history, and political science at the University of Hamburg and the Philipps University of Marburg. In 1980, she completed her Ph.D. with a dissertation on the socialization of nature and the nature of society. She obtained her habilitation at the Philosophical Faculty of the Heinrich Heine University Düsseldorf in 1988. From 1989 to 2018, she held the professorship in theoretical philosophy at the philosophical institute of Freie Universität Berlin from 1989 to 2018. Krämer is a founding member of the Hermann von Hermann von Helmholtz-Zentrum für Kulturtechnik at Humboldt University of Berlin and has led several research projects there within the research group "Image, Script, Figure" (orig. "Bild, Schrift, Zahl").

From 2000 to 2006, Krämer was a member of the German Science and Humanities Council, and from 2005 to 2008, she was a Permanent Fellow at the Berlin Institute for Advanced Study. She also served as a member of the European Research Council from 2007 to 2014. Since 2010, she has been a member of the Senate of the German Research Foundation. She has been visiting professor at the Vienna University of Technology, the Max Reinhardt Seminar in Vienna, and at University of Graz, University of Lucerne, University of Zurich and University of Tokyo.

Since 2019, she is a guest researcher at the Institute of Culture and Aesthetics of Digital Media at the Leuphana University Lüneburg. Additionally, she is a Corporation Partner at the research project "How is AI changing Science?".

== Research areas ==
Krämer's research focuses on the 17th-century rationalism, philosophy of language and writing, testimony and witnessing, as well as media and cultural techniques and digitality and history of computation. Her concept of the genesis of operative symbol use has been applied in the historiography of structural mechanics.

== Honors ==
In 2016, Krämer was awarded an honorary doctorate from Linköping University.

== Publications ==
- Media, Messenger, Transmission: An Approach to Media Philosophy, Amsterdam: University Press 2015. (transl. from Medium, Bote, Übertragung: Kleine Metaphysik der Medialität, Suhrkamp, Frankfurt am Main, 2008)
- Testimony Bearing Witness: Epistemology, Ethics, History and Culture. Editors: Sybille Krämer & Sigrid Weigel. London: Rowman & Littlefield, 2017
- Thinking with Diagrams: The Semiotic Basis of Human Cognition. Editors: Sybille Krämer & Christina Ljungberg. Boston/ Berlin: Mouton de Gruyter (Mouton series Semiotics, Communication and Cognition Vol 17), 2016
