= Brandenbaumer Bach =

River in Germany

Location
- Country: Germany
- State: North Rhine-Westphalia

Physical characteristics
- Source
  - location: Southeast of Verlar, a district of Salzkotten
  - coordinates: 51.6834°N 8.4765°E
- Mouth
  - location: Northeast of Verlar
  - coordinates: 51.6972°N 8.4666°E
- Basin size: 130 km^{2} (50 sq mi)

Basin features
- Progression: Lippe→ Rhine→ North Sea
- Tributaries
  - left: Störmeder Bach
  - right: Geseker Bach

Brandenbaumer Bach is a river of North Rhine-Westphalia, Germany. It is formed at the confluence of the Geseker Bach and the Störmeder Bach. It is a left tributary of the Lippe.

== See also ==
- List of rivers of North Rhine-Westphalia
