= Pader (river) =

River in Germany

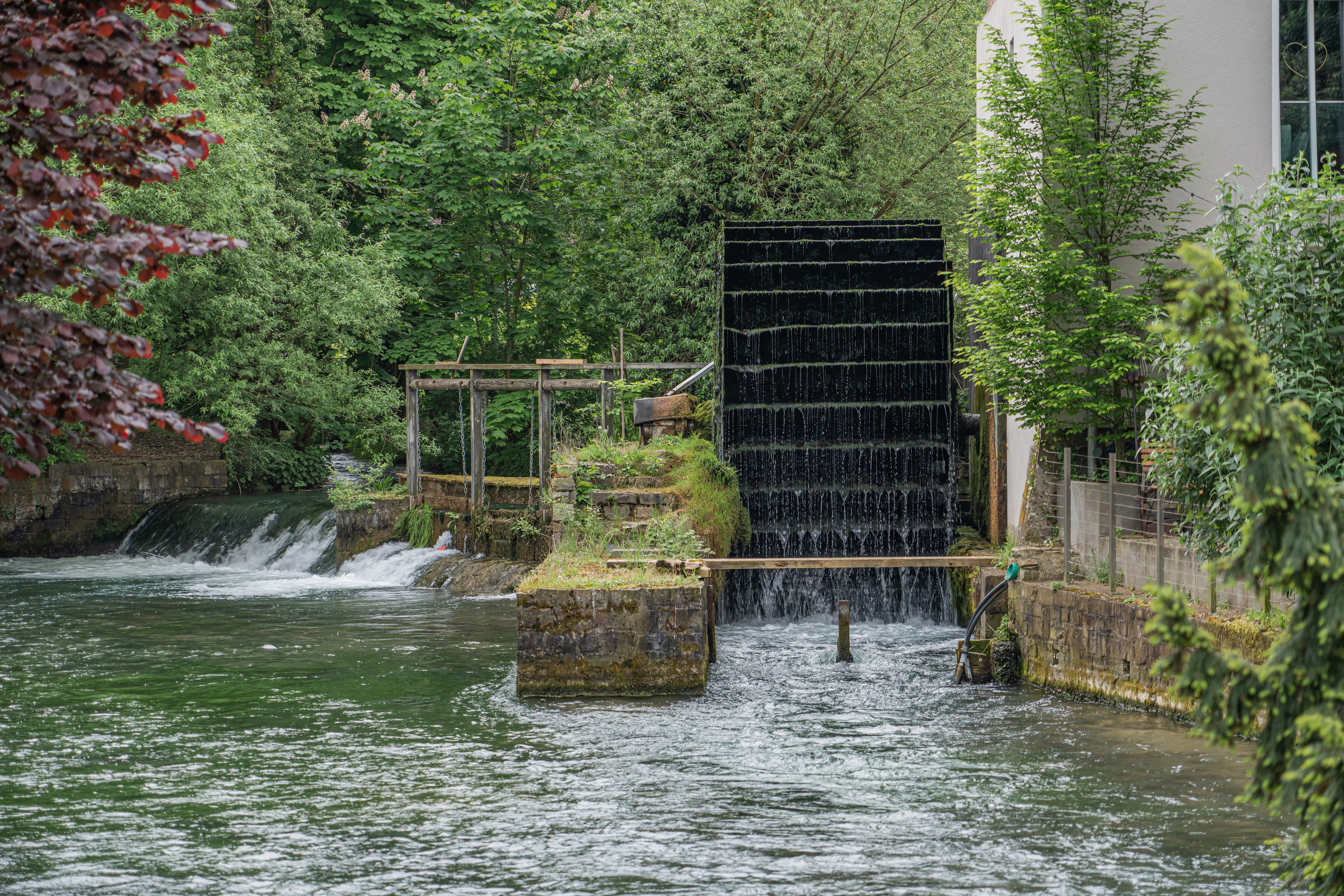
- The Pader at the Stümpel watermill

Location
- Country: Germany
- State: North Rhine-Westphalia

Physical characteristics
- Source
  - location: Paderborn, Germany
- Mouth
  - location: Lippe
  - coordinates: 51.73°N 8.72°E
- Length: 4 km (2.5 mi)
- Discharge
  - average: 3 to 9 m^{3}/s (110 to 320 cu ft/s) (at its source)

Basin features
- Progression: Lippe→ Rhine→ North Sea

The Pader (German pronunciation: [ˈpaːdɐ]) is a river in North Rhine-Westphalia, Germany, left tributary of the Lippe. It runs through the city of Paderborn, which it gave its name. Although fairly wide, it is only 4 kilometres (2.5 mi) in length which makes it the shortest river this size of Germany.

Sources of the Pader in Paderborn

The Pader receives its water from six source rivers, each resulting from a karstic spring in the centre of Paderborn: the Maspernpader, the Dielenpader, the Rothobornpader, the Börnepader, the Dammpader and the Warme Pader.

== See also ==
- List of rivers of North Rhine-Westphalia
