= Britt Hagedorn =

German television personality

Britt Hagedorn (born Britt Reinecke, 2 January 1972 in Hamburg) is a German model and television presenter who hosts the Talk Show Britt – Der Talk um eins on Sat 1.

Besides German she speaks English, French and Spanish.

She studied communication science at the University of Lüneburg, in Germany and graduated in 1999.

She also studied Art History, Culture and Literature.

She is married to Ralph Hagedorn since December 16, 2005 and took his name. They have a daughter named Soma (*2007). Britt is expecting the couple's second child in summer 2010.
