= Andreas Keuser =

German cyclist (born 1974)

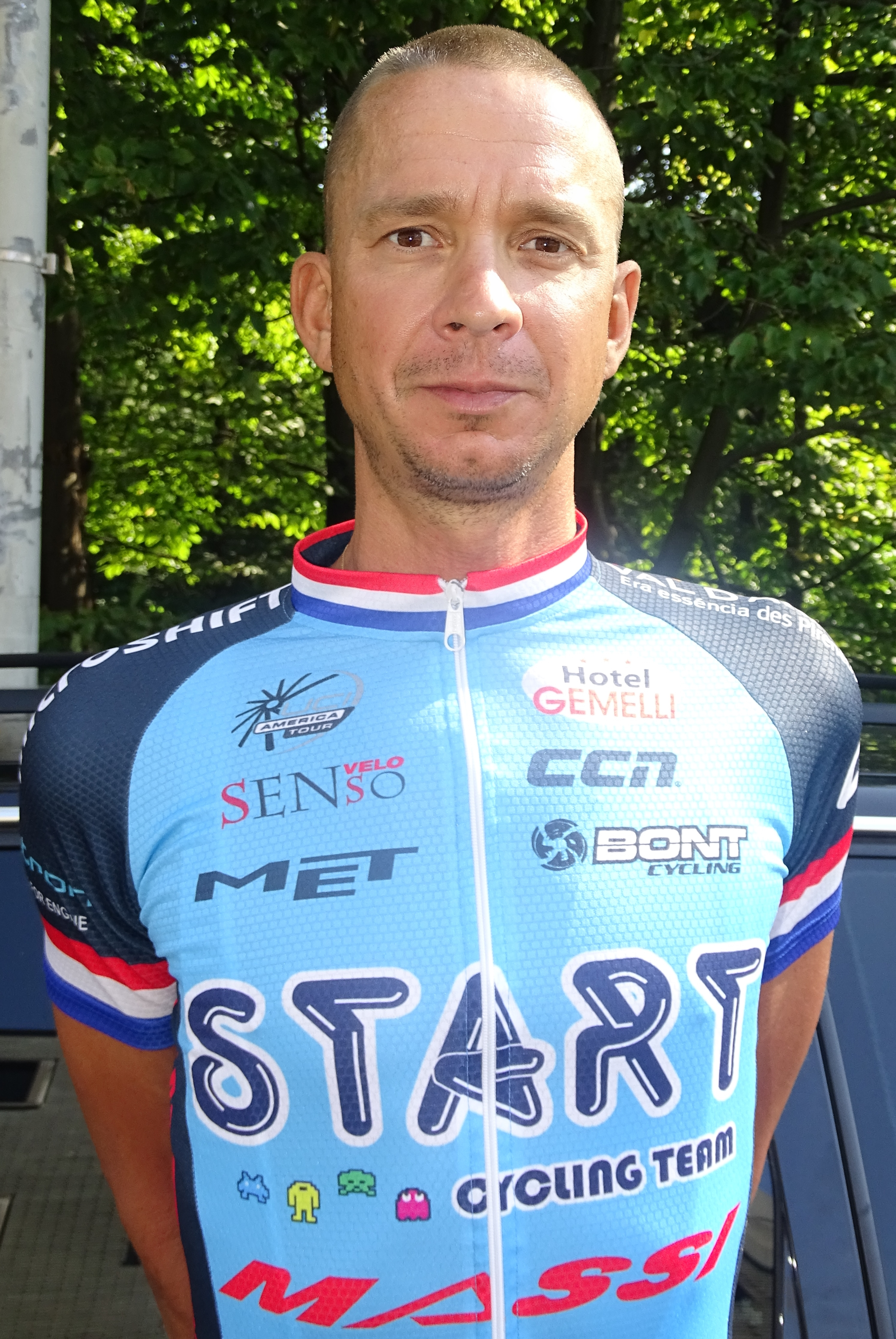

Personal information
- Born: 14 April 1974 (age 52) Salzkotten, West Germany

Cycling career
- Sport: Cycling
- Current team: Retired
- Discipline: Road
- Role: Rider

Professional teams
- 2009: Meridiana–Kalev Chocolate
- 2009–2010: Kuban
- 2010–2011: Team Worldofbike.Gr
- 2013: Etcetera–Worldofbike
- 2014: Keith Mobel–Partizan
- 2015: Start–Massi Cycling Team
- 2016: Massi–Kuwait Cycling Project
- 2017: Kuwait–Cartucho.es
- 2018: Java Partizan

Andreas Keuser (born 14 April 1974) is a German former professional racing cyclist.

== Major results ==
2008
5th Overall Tour de la Pharmacie Centrale
2011
1st Overall Tour of Trakya
1st Stage 8 Tour of Romania
2013
7th Tobago Cycling Classic
2016
8th Circuit International d'Alger
