= Santuario de Nuestra Señora del Acebo =

Coordinates: 43.1587°N 6.4990°W

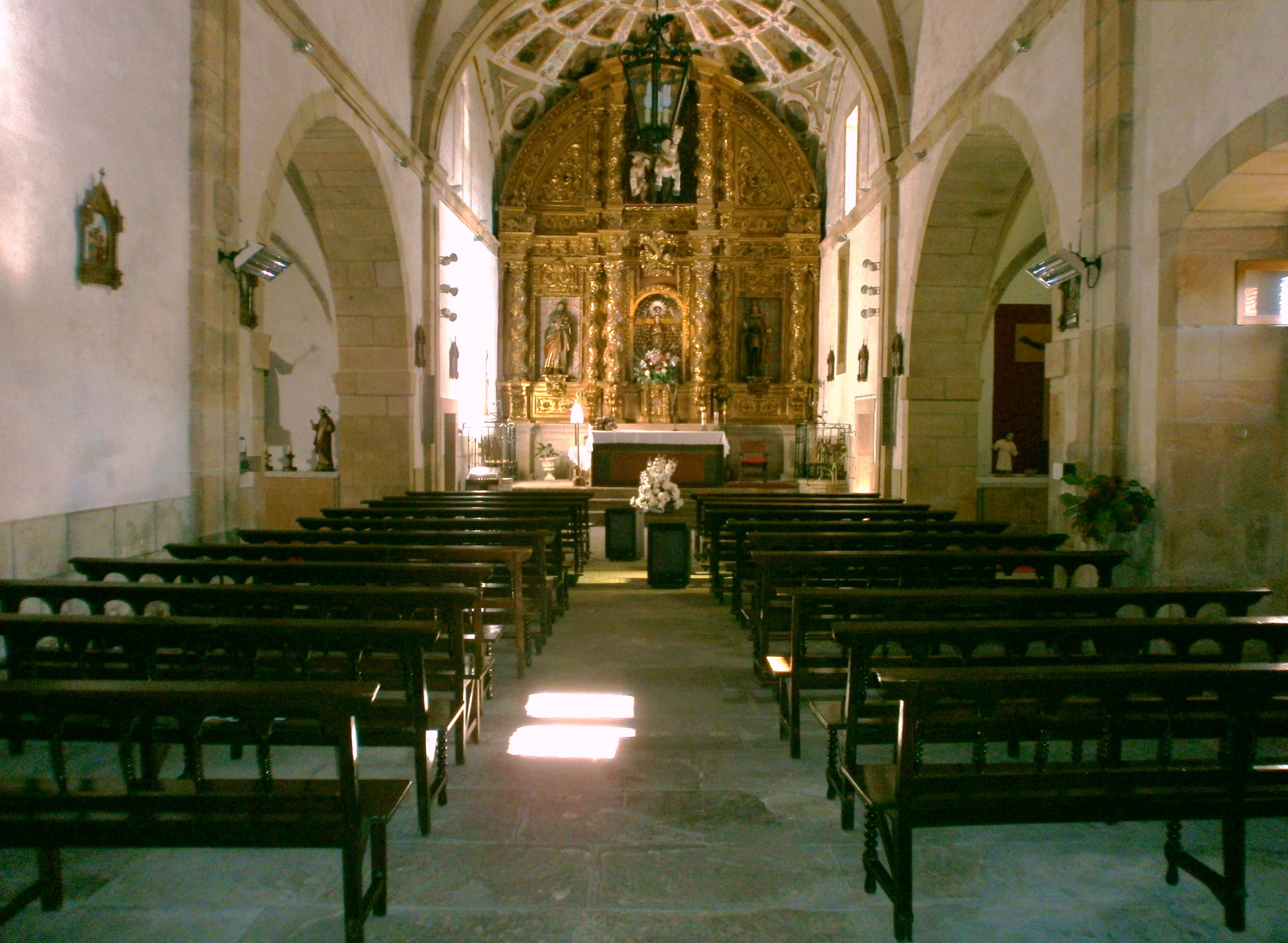
- View of the inside of the Sanctuary
- Santuario de Nuestra Señora del Acebo
- Location: Asturias, Spain

Santuario de Nuestra Señora del Acebo is a church situated in Asturias, Spain.

The church was built around a chapel with a putatively miraculous image of the Virgin Mary, depicting Our Lady of Virtues. It took only fifteen years to build since the first miracle (1575) took place; thus the sanctuary was completed in 1590.
