= Geinegge =

River in Germany

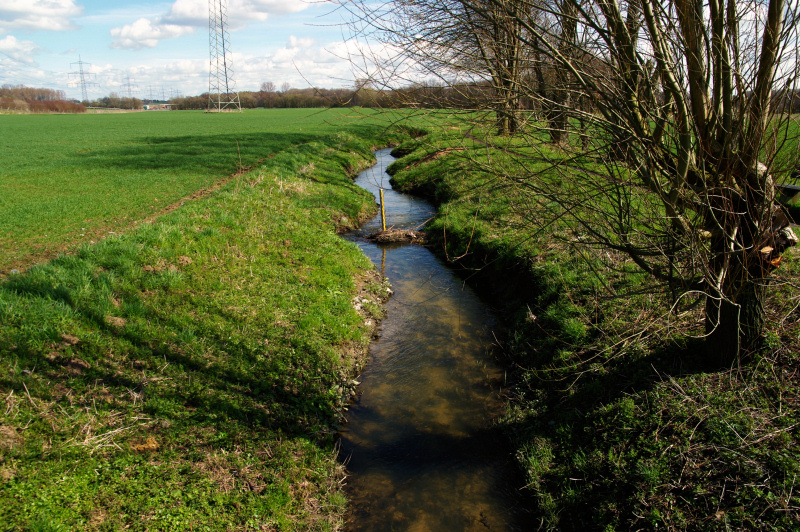

Location
- Country: Germany
- States: North Rhine-Westphalia

Physical characteristics
- Mouth
  - location: Lippe
  - coordinates: 51.6819°N 7.7751°E

Basin features
- Progression: Lippe→ Rhine→ North Sea

Geinegge is a river of North Rhine-Westphalia, Germany. It flows into the Lippe in Hamm.

== See also ==
- List of rivers of North Rhine-Westphalia
