= Steinbeke =

River in Germany

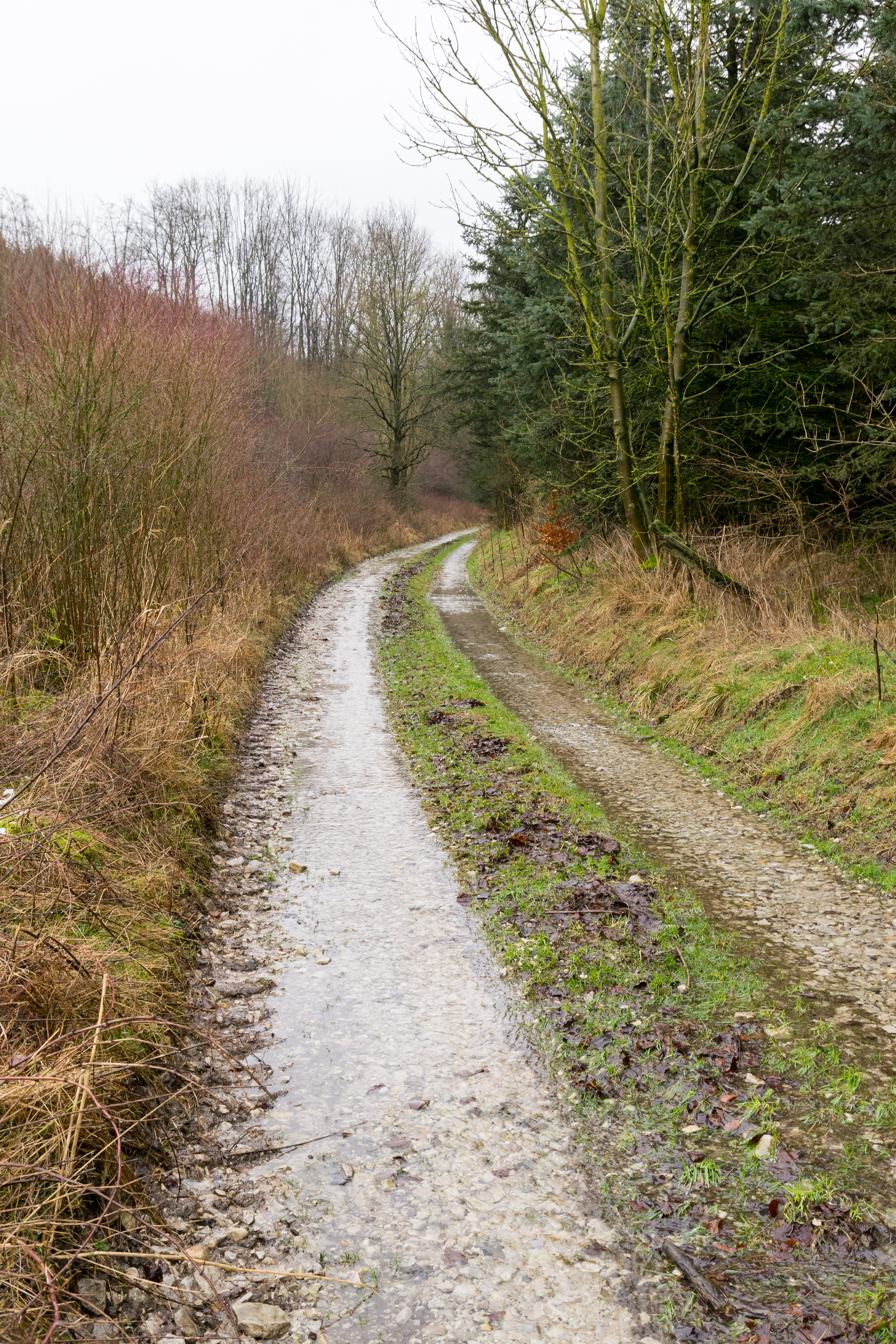

Location
- Country: Germany
- State: North Rhine-Westphalia

Physical characteristics
- Mouth
  - location: Lippe
  - coordinates: 51.7731°N 8.8109°E

Basin features
- Progression: Lippe→ Rhine→ North Sea

Steinbeke is a river of North Rhine-Westphalia, Germany. It is 8.6 km (5.3 mi) long and flows into the Lippe as a left tributary in Bad Lippspringe.

== See also ==
- List of rivers of North Rhine-Westphalia
