= Thomas Schomerus =

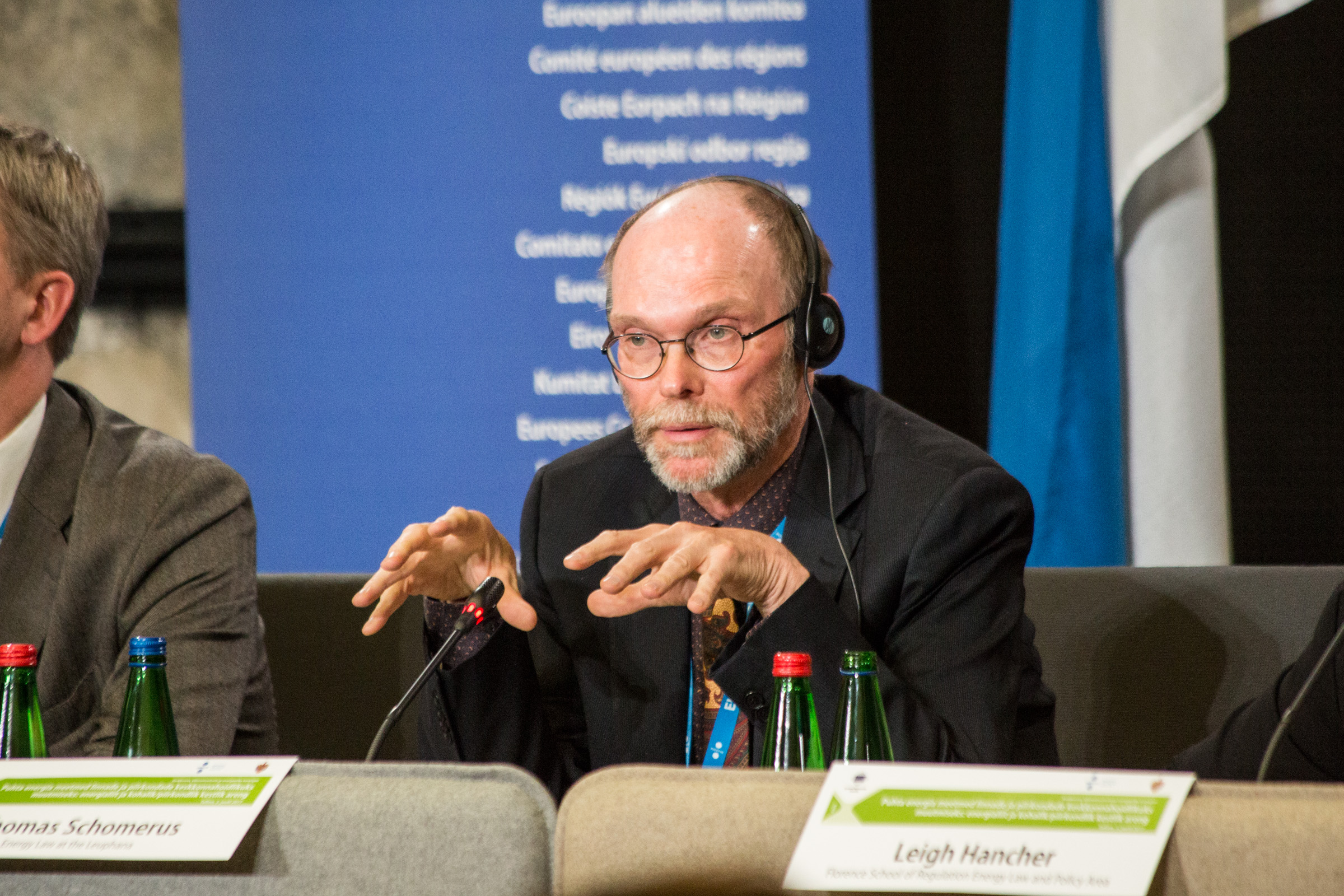
Thomas Schomerus

Thomas Schomerus (born 1957) is Professor of Public Law, in particular Energy- and Environmental Law, at Leuphana University Lueneburg, Germany.

He studied law at the universities of Hamburg and Göttingen. Beside his work in several research projects he wrote his dissertation on “Deficits in Nature Protection Law”. After a career in public service for the Free and Hanseatic City of Hamburg, in 1996 he became professor in Lueneburg. He is member of the Institute for Business Law and the Institute for Sustainability Governance. His fields of research are the law of renewable energies and energy efficiency, law of resource protection and waste law as well as freedom of information.
