= Kuwait–Cartucho.es =

Team information
- UCI code: KWC
- Registered: Kuwait
- Founded: 2017
- Disbanded: 2017
- Discipline: Road
- Status: UCI Continental

Team name history
- 2017: Kuwait–Cartucho.es

Kuwait–Cartucho.es was a Kuwaiti UCI Continental cycling team that existed only for the 2017 road cycling season.

In November 2016, the team announced the signing of Davide Rebellin and Stefan Schumacher - both of which have served bans for doping positives.

== Team roster ==
As of 31 December 2017.

Rider	Date of birth
Abdulhadi Alajmi (KUW)	2 May 1995 (age 31)
Hamad Alhattab (KUW)	10 February 1992 (age 34)
Khaled Alkhalifah (KUW)	23 April 1995 (age 31)
Salman Alsaffar (KUW)	26 January 1989 (age 37)
Awet Gebremedhin Andemeskel (ERI)	5 February 1992 (age 34)
Matt Boys (AUS)	13 November 1989 (age 36)
Axel Costa (ESP)	10 October 1994 (age 31)
Fernando Grijalba (ESP)	14 January 1991 (age 35)
José Manuel Gutiérrez (ESP)	4 May 1988 (age 38)

Rider	Date of birth
Songezo Jim (RSA)	17 September 1990 (age 35)
Andreas Keuser (GER)	14 April 1974 (age 52)
Ali Moslim (KUW)	1 November 1994 (age 31)
Salah Eddine Mraouni (MAR)	28 December 1992 (age 33)
Davide Rebellin (ITA)	9 August 1971 (age 55)
Stefan Schumacher (GER)	21 July 1981 (age 45)
Björn Thurau (GER)	23 July 1988 (age 38)
Edwin Torres (VEN)	14 February 1997 (age 29)

== Major wins ==
2017
Stage 1 Le Tour de Filipinas, Fernando Grijalba
Stages 4 & 8 Tour du Cameroun, Salah Eddine Mraouni
Stage 6 Tour du Maroc, Salah Eddine Mraouni
Overall International Tour de Banyuwangi Ijen, Davide Rebellin

Stage 1, Davide Rebellin

Stage 5 Tour of Iran (Azerbaijan), Davide Rebellin
