= Sickingmühlenbach =

River in Germany

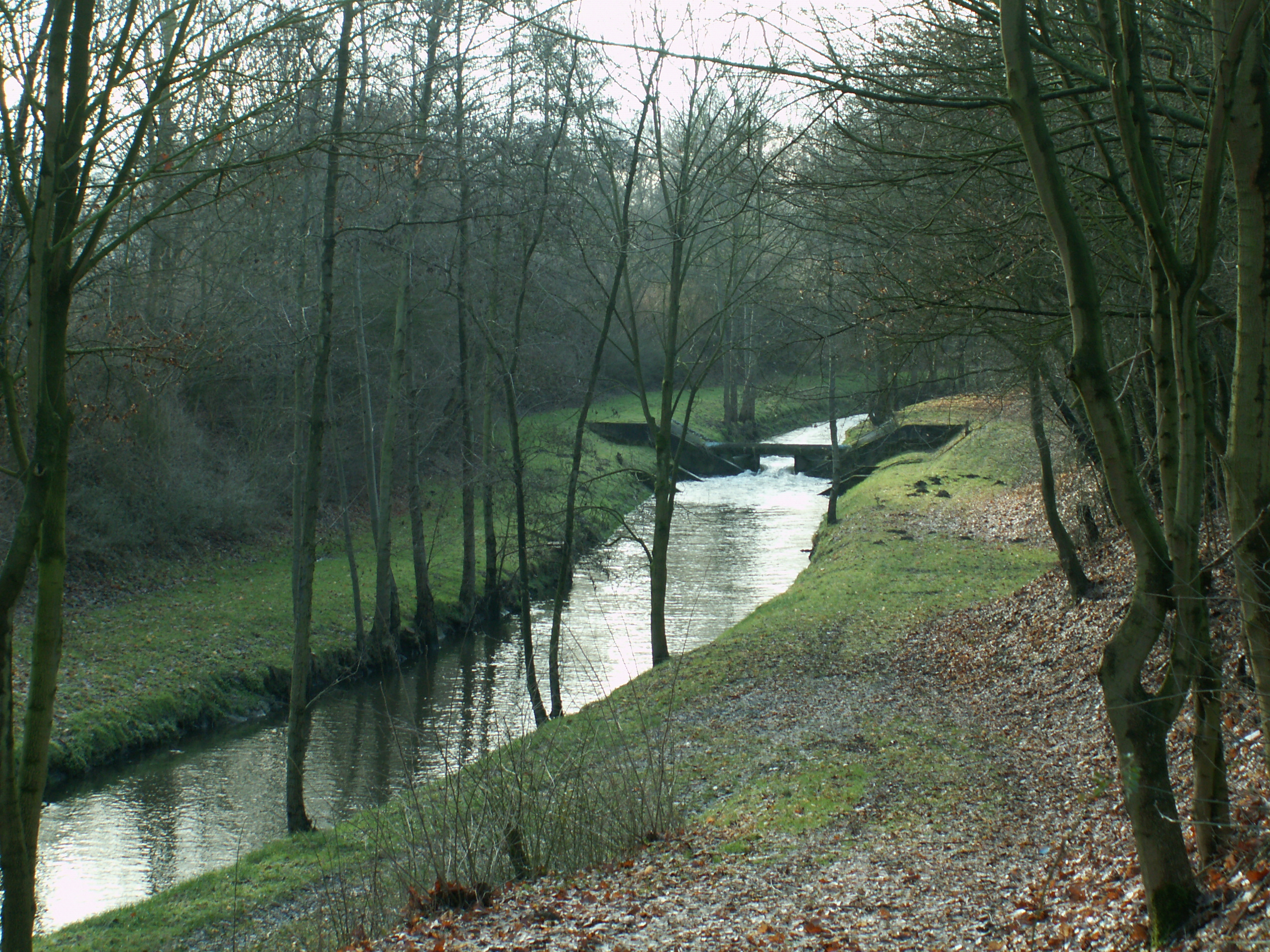

Location
- Country: Germany
- State: North Rhine-Westphalia

Physical characteristics
- Mouth
  - location: Lippe
  - coordinates: 51°42′13″N 7°06′41″E
- Length: 14.0 km (8.7 mi)

Basin features
- Progression: Lippe→ Rhine→ North Sea

Sickingmühlenbach is a river of North Rhine-Westphalia, Germany. It flows into the Lippe near Marl. Upstream from the confluence with its main tributary, the Loemühlenbach, it is also called Silvertbach.

== See also ==
- List of rivers of North Rhine-Westphalia
