= 2016 Giro del Trentino =

2016 UCI Europe Tour

Race details
- Dates: April 19, 2016–April 22, 2016
- Stages: 4
- Distance: 597.6 km (371.3 mi)

Results
| Jersey awarded to the overall winner | Winner | Mikel Landa (ESP) | (Team Sky) |
| | Second | Tanel Kangert (EST) | (Astana) |
| | Third | Jakob Fuglsang (DEN) | (Astana) |
| Jersey awarded to the mountains classification winner | Mountains | Mikel Landa (ESP) | (Team Sky) |
| Jersey awarded to the young rider classification winner | Young rider | Egan Bernal (COL) | (Androni Giocattoli–Sidermec) |
| Jersey awarded to the sprints classification winner | Sprints | Antonio Molina (ESP) | (Caja Rural–Seguros RGA) |
| | Team | AG2R La Mondiale | |

The 2016 Giro del Trentino was a road cycling stage race that took place in the Trentino region of northern Italy between 19 and 22 April 2016. It was the 40th edition of the Giro del Trentino and was rated as a 2.HC event as part of the 2016 UCI Europe Tour.

The race included four stages. The first was a 12.1-kilometre (7.5 mi) team time trial. The remaining stages were all mountainous, with Stage 2 ending with a summit finish in Anras. The previous year's champion, BMC Racing Team's Richie Porte, chose not to compete. The principal favourites for victory were Mikel Landa (Team Sky), Romain Bardet and Domenico Pozzovivo (both AG2R La Mondiale) and Vincenzo Nibali (Astana).

After Astana won the opening team time trial, Landa won the second stage with its summit finish. The last two stages were both won by Astana's Tanel Kangert. Despite the bonus seconds won by Kangert, Landa won the general classification by two seconds. Kangert's teammate Jakob Fuglsang was third, 14 seconds behind Landa.

== Route ==
Stages
| Stage | Date | Route | Distance | Type | Winner |
|---|---|---|---|---|---|
| 1 | 19 April | Riva to Torbole | 12.1 km (7.5 mi) | Team time trial | Astana |
| 2 | 20 April | Arco to Anras | 220 km (136.7 mi) | Mountain stage | Mikel Landa (ESP) |
| 3 | 21 April | Sillian to Mezzolombardo | 204.6 km (127.1 mi) | Mountain stage | Tanel Kangert (EST) |
| 4 | 22 April | Malè to Cles | 160.9 km (100.0 mi) | Mountain stage | Tanel Kangert (EST) |
| Total | | 597.6 km (371.3 mi) | | | |

== Teams ==
Eighteen teams will take part in the race. Three of these are UCI WorldTeams; eight are UCI Professional Continental teams; six are UCI Continental teams; one is an Italian national team.

== Stages ==
=== Stage 1 ===
19 April 2016, Riva to Torbole, 12.1 km (7.5 mi) (TTT)

Stage 1 result
| Rank | Team | Time |
|---|---|---|
| 1 | Astana | 13' 30" |
| 2 | Team Sky | +14" |
| 3 | AG2R La Mondiale | +14" |
| 4 | Bora–Argon 18 | +16" |
| 5 | Gazprom–RusVelo | +21" |
| 6 | Bardiani–CSF | +34" |
| 7 | Nippo–Vini Fantini | +34" |
| 8 | Southeast–Venezuela | +35" |
| 9 | Androni Giocattoli–Sidermec | +36" |
| 10 | Italy | +44" |

General classification after Stage 1 (TTT)
| Rank | Rider | Team | Time |
|---|---|---|---|
| 1 | Valerio Agnoli (ITA) | Astana | 13' 30" |
| 2 | Vincenzo Nibali (ITA) | Astana | +0" |
| 3 | Jakob Fuglsang (DEN) | Astana | +0" |
| 4 | Eros Capecchi (ITA) | Astana | +0" |
| 5 | Tanel Kangert (EST) | Astana | +0" |
| 6 | Michele Scarponi (ITA) | Astana | +0" |
| 7 | Bakhtiyar Kozhatayev (KAZ) | Astana | +0" |
| 8 | Gianni Moscon (ITA) | Team Sky | + 14" |
| 9 | Mikel Landa (ESP) | Team Sky | + 14" |
| 10 | Philip Deignan (IRL) | Team Sky | + 14" |

=== Stage 2 ===
20 April 2016, Arco to Anras, 220 km (140 mi)

Result of Stage 2
| Rank | Rider | Team | Time |
|---|---|---|---|
| 1 | Mikel Landa (ESP) | Team Sky | 5h 18' 12" |
| 2 | Sergey Firsanov (RUS) | Gazprom–RusVelo | + 4" |
| 3 | Damiano Cunego (ITA) | Nippo–Vini Fantini | + 13" |
| 4 | Giulio Ciccone (ITA) | Bardiani–CSF | + 14" |
| 5 | Jakob Fuglsang (DEN) | Astana | + 14" |
| 6 | Simone Andreetta (ITA) | Bardiani–CSF | + 14" |
| 7 | Romain Bardet (FRA) | AG2R La Mondiale | + 14" |
| 8 | Domenico Pozzovivo (ITA) | AG2R La Mondiale | + 14" |
| 9 | Patrick Konrad (AUT) | Bora–Argon 18 | + 14" |
| 10 | Emanuel Buchmann (GER) | Bora–Argon 18 | + 14" |

General classification after Stage 2
| Rank | Rider | Team | Time |
|---|---|---|---|
| 1 | Mikel Landa (ESP) | Team Sky | 5h 31' 46" |
| 2 | Jakob Fuglsang (DEN) | Astana | + 10" |
| 3 | Sergey Firsanov (RUS) | Gazprom–RusVelo | + 15" |
| 4 | Michele Scarponi (ITA) | Astana | + 22" |
| 5 | Romain Bardet (FRA) | AG2R La Mondiale | + 24" |
| 6 | Domenico Pozzovivo (ITA) | AG2R La Mondiale | + 24" |
| 7 | Patrick Konrad (AUT) | Bora–Argon 18 | + 26" |
| 8 | Emanuel Buchmann (GER) | Bora–Argon 18 | + 26" |
| 9 | Tanel Kangert (EST) | Astana | + 28" |
| 10 | Vincenzo Nibali (ITA) | Astana | + 28" |

=== Stage 3 ===
21 April 2016, Sillian to Mezzolombardo, 204.6 km (127.1 mi)

Result of Stage 3
| Rank | Rider | Team | Time |
|---|---|---|---|
| 1 | Tanel Kangert (EST) | Astana | 5h 05' 27" |
| 2 | Patrick Konrad (AUT) | Bora–Argon 18 | + 10" |
| 3 | Romain Bardet (FRA) | AG2R La Mondiale | + 10" |
| 4 | Jakob Fuglsang (DEN) | Astana | + 10" |
| 5 | Sergey Firsanov (RUS) | Gazprom–RusVelo | + 10" |
| 6 | Mikel Landa (ESP) | Team Sky | + 10" |
| 7 | Emanuel Buchmann (GER) | Bora–Argon 18 | + 10" |
| 8 | Jean-Christophe Péraud (FRA) | AG2R La Mondiale | + 10" |
| 9 | Egan Bernal (COL) | Androni Giocattoli–Sidermec | + 10" |
| 10 | Domenico Pozzovivo (ITA) | AG2R La Mondiale | + 10" |

General classification after Stage 3
| Rank | Rider | Team | Time |
|---|---|---|---|
| 1 | Mikel Landa (ESP) | Team Sky | 10h 37' 23" |
| 2 | Tanel Kangert (EST) | Astana | + 8" |
| 3 | Jakob Fuglsang (DEN) | Astana | + 10" |
| 4 | Sergey Firsanov (RUS) | Gazprom–RusVelo | + 15" |
| 5 | Romain Bardet (FRA) | AG2R La Mondiale | + 20" |
| 6 | Patrick Konrad (AUT) | Bora–Argon 18 | + 20" |
| 7 | Domenico Pozzovivo (ITA) | AG2R La Mondiale | + 24" |
| 8 | Emanuel Buchmann (GER) | Bora–Argon 18 | + 26" |
| 9 | Jean-Christophe Péraud (FRA) | AG2R La Mondiale | + 38" |
| 10 | Hubert Dupont (FRA) | AG2R La Mondiale | + 52" |

=== Stage 4 ===
22 April, Malè to Cles, 160.9 km (100.0 mi)

Result of Stage 4
| Rank | Rider | Team | Time |
|---|---|---|---|
| 1 | Tanel Kangert (EST) | Astana | 4h 07' 29" |
| 2 | Matteo Busato (ITA) | Southeast–Venezuela | + 0" |
| 3 | Mikel Landa (ESP) | Team Sky | + 0" |
| 4 | Patrick Konrad (AUT) | Bora–Argon 18 | + 0" |
| 5 | Jakob Fuglsang (DEN) | Astana | + 0" |
| 6 | Sergey Firsanov (RUS) | Gazprom–RusVelo | + 0" |
| 7 | Domenico Pozzovivo (ITA) | AG2R La Mondiale | + 0" |
| 8 | Romain Bardet (FRA) | AG2R La Mondiale | + 0" |
| 9 | Sergio Pardilla (ESP) | Caja Rural–Seguros RGA | + 0" |
| 10 | Hubert Dupont (FRA) | AG2R La Mondiale | + 0" |

General classification after Stage 4
| Rank | Rider | Team | Time |
|---|---|---|---|
| 1 | Mikel Landa (ESP) | Team Sky | 14h 44' 48" |
| 2 | Tanel Kangert (EST) | Astana | + 2" |
| 3 | Jakob Fuglsang (DEN) | Astana | + 14" |
| 4 | Sergey Firsanov (RUS) | Gazprom–RusVelo | + 19" |
| 5 | Patrick Konrad (AUT) | Bora–Argon 18 | + 24" |
| 6 | Romain Bardet (FRA) | AG2R La Mondiale | + 24" |
| 7 | Domenico Pozzovivo (ITA) | AG2R La Mondiale | + 28" |
| 8 | Emanuel Buchmann (GER) | Bora–Argon 18 | + 30" |
| 9 | Jean-Christophe Péraud (FRA) | AG2R La Mondiale | + 42" |
| 10 | Hubert Dupont (FRA) | AG2R La Mondiale | + 56" |

== Classifications ==
| Stage | Winner | General classification | Mountains classification | Young rider classification | Intermediate sprints classification | Teams classification |
|---|---|---|---|---|---|---|
| 1 | Astana | Valerio Agnoli | not awarded | Gianni Moscon | not awarded | Astana |
| 2 | Mikel Landa | Mikel Landa | Mikel Landa | Giulio Ciccone | Nicola Gaffurini | AG2R La Mondiale |
| 3 | Tanel Kangert | Mikel Landa | Mikel Landa | Egan Bernal | Antonio Molina | AG2R La Mondiale |
| 4 | Tanel Kangert | Mikel Landa | Mikel Landa | Egan Bernal | Antonio Molina | AG2R La Mondiale |
| Final | | Mikel Landa | Mikel Landa | Egan Bernal | Antonio Molina | AG2R La Mondiale |
