= Jörg Philipp Terhechte =

German jurist (1975–2024)

Jörg Philipp Terhechte (1975 – 22 November 2024) was a German legal scholar, university professor at the Leuphana University of Lüneburg, Professor at the University of Glasgow and vice president of the Leuphana University of Lüneburg.

== Background ==
Terhechte came from a Westphalian artist family. His grandfather was the painter Theodor Terhechte. His father was the painter, art historian and art teacher Hans Terhechte. After graduating from the Georgianum high school in Vreden Terhechte studied jurisprudence and philosophy at the University of Bielefeld from 1995 to 2000. In 2000 he passed the first state examination at the Higher Regional Court of Hamm. From 2003 to 2005 he completed his legal clerkship, inter alia at the Federal Cartel Office in Bonn, the law firm Coudert Brothers LLP US in Brussels and the US Federal Trade Commission in Washington, D.C. In 2005 he completed the 2nd state examination in Düsseldorf. In 2003 he completed his studies at the Faculty of Law of the University of Bielefeld with a Dr. jur. Doctorate. In his dissertation Terhechte studied "The unwritten constituent elements of European competition law." From 2000 to 2004 he was a research associate of Armin Hatje at the Department of Public Law, European and International Law at the University of Bielefeld. From 2004 to 2006 he was an assistant professor at this chair. From 2006 to 2011 he was an assistant professor at the Department of Public Law and Political Science (European Community Law Seminar) at the University of Hamburg. In 2011 he was appointed to a professorship for Public Law (Constitutional and Administrative Law) and European Law at the University of Siegen. Since October 2012 he held the chair of Public Law, European and International Law, Regulatory and Antitrust Law at the Leuphana University of Lüneburg. His research interests were public law as well as European and international law. He focused on EU law as well as European and international business law, in particular the competition and regulatory law. Terhechte was considered very pro-European and internationally well-connected.

In 2016, he was elected vice president of the Leuphana University of Lüneburg. In 2018 he was appointed Professor of European and International Business Law at the University of Glasgow.

His research focused on public law as well as European and international law. Special focus was placed on EU law and European and international commercial law, in particular competition and regulatory law. He also dealt with issues of scientific education / executive education and the internationalization of higher education.

Terhechte was married to the lawyer and lecturer Nicole Terhechte-Gerick, and had three children. He died on 22 November 2024, at the age of 49.

== Work ==
Terhechte was the managing director of the Competition & Regulation Institute at Leuphana University Lüneburg since 2012 and was the head of the Leuphana Professional School since 2013. With more than 1,150 students and numerous study programs, the Professional School became one of the leading institutions for academic further education / executive education in Germany. He was also the founder and director of the Competition & Regulation Master's Degree Program (LL.M.) at the Leuphana Professional School. From 2014, he set up the Master's Degree Program "International Economic Law" (LL.M.) as part of a dual-master program with the School of Law at the University of Glasgow. This program was supplemented by other partners in later years, such as the University of the West Indies (Jamaica, Barbados, Trinidad and Tobago).

In 2016, he was elected vice president of Leuphana University Lüneburg and was responsible for the following business units: Professional School, Internationalization and Fundraising. In 2018, he was elected managing director of the Institute for European Integration at the Europa-Kolleg, Hamburg and was also a member of the Foundation Board of the Europa-Kolleg Foundation, Hamburg. Since 2019 he was Academic Director and chairman of the academic board of the European Center for Advanced Studies (ECAS), a joint academic institution of the University of Glasgow and the Leuphana University of Lüneburg.

Terhechte was co-editor of the European Yearbook of International Economic Law since 2008 and since 2004 he was working for the editorial board of the leading European law journal Europarecht. He was since 2008 general editor of the ten-volume Encyclopaedia of European Law. From 2018, he was one of the editors of a leading major commentary on the law of the EU (Groben / Hatje / Schwarze / Terhechte), which was published by Nomos Verlag from 1958.

== Research stays / guest professorships / awards ==
In 2005 Terhechte was honored for his doctoral thesis with the dissertation prize of the Westphalia-Lippe University Society. In 2006 he was a DAAD-visiting scholar at the George Washington University Law School and at the US Federal Trade Commission in Washington, D.C. In 2008 he was a DAAD-Visiting Fellow at the Institute for European and Comparative Law at the University of Oxford and a visiting professor at the Radboud University of Nijmegen. Since 2011 he was a Fellow of the Europa-Kolleg in Hamburg. Since 2006, he was a lecturer and faculty member at the Europa-Kolleg in Hamburg. Since 2007 he was continuously lecturer at the Charles University in Prague. From 2008 he was a lecturer at the China-Europe School of Law in Beijing and he was continuously a lecturer of "German and International Commercial Law" in St. Petersburg. Since 2014 he was a lay judge at the Administrative Court of Lüneburg (disciplinary tribunal) and since 2006 a member of the Judicial Examination Office at the Hanseatic Higher Regional Court in Hamburg. In 2015 the University Court of the University of Glasgow appointed Jörg Philipp Terhechte as an honorary professor.
