= Miguel Ángel Benito =

Spanish cyclist (born 1993)

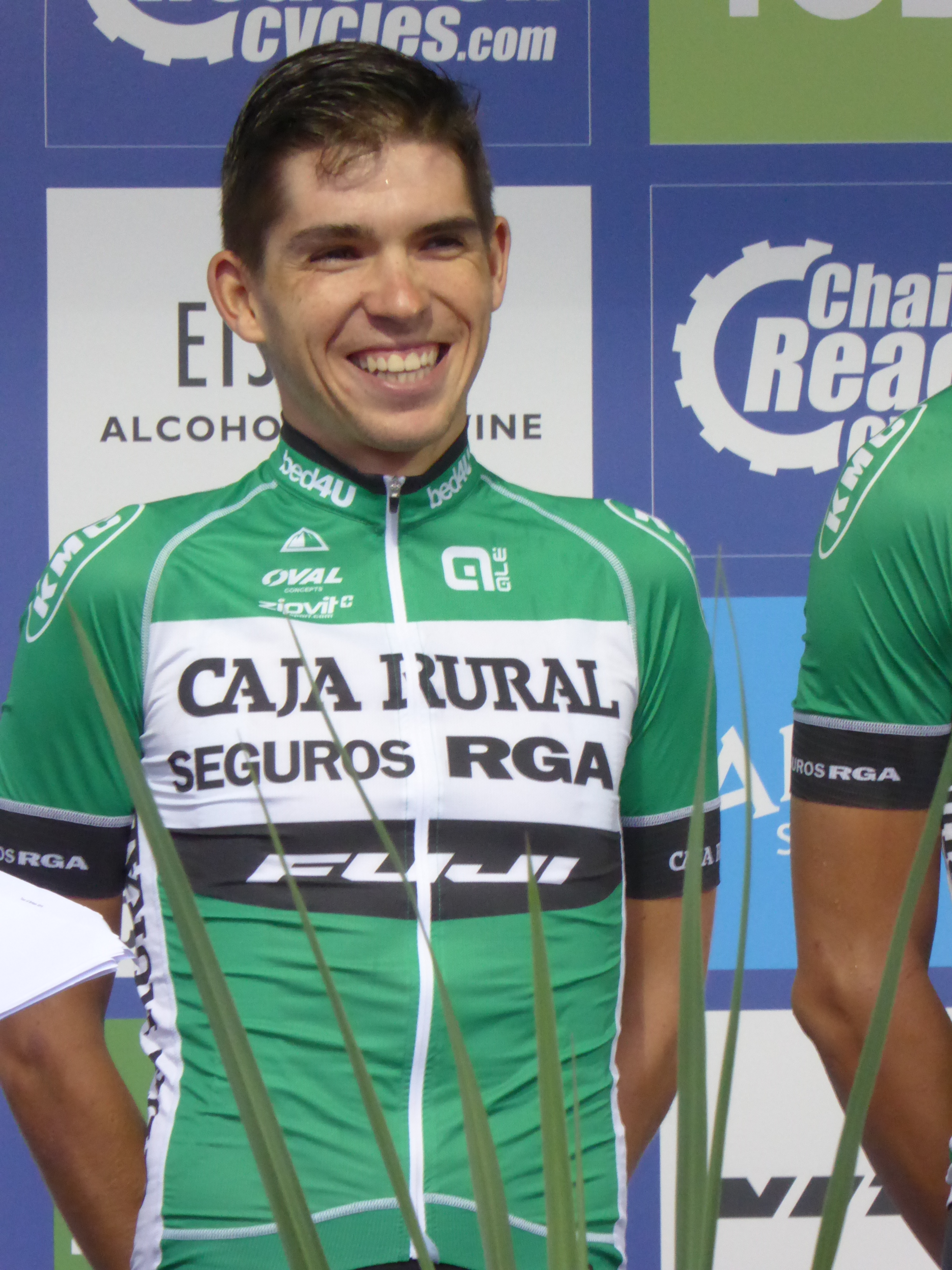
- Benito in 2016

Personal information
- Full name: Miguel Ángel Benito Díez
- Born: 21 September 1993 (age 33) León, Spain
- Height: 1.81 m (5 ft 11 in)
- Weight: 67 kg (148 lb)

Cycling career
- Sport: Cycling
- Current team: Retired
- Discipline: Road
- Role: Rider

Amateur team
- 2012–2014: Club Ciclista Burunda

Professional teams
- 2014: Caja Rural–Seguros RGA (stagiaire)
- 2015–2018: Caja Rural–Seguros RGA

Miguel Ángel Benito Díez (born 21 September 1993) is a Spanish former professional racing cyclist, who rode professionally for UCI Professional Continental team Caja Rural–Seguros RGA, between 2015 and 2018.

== Major results ==
2011
9th Road race, UEC European Junior Championships
2013
8th Overall Vuelta Ciclista a León
2017
8th Overall Colorado Classic
