= Leuphana University of Lüneburg =

German public university in Lüneburg, Lower Saxony

- Leuphana Universität Lüneburg
- Motto: Academic freedom and social responsibility for the common good
- Type: Public
- Established: 1946 (as a college of education)
- Budget: €103.2 million
- President: Sascha Spoun
- Academic staff: 585
- Administrative staff: 576
- Students: 9,348
- Location: Lüneburg, Lower Saxony, Germany; 53°13′44″N 10°24′04″E
- Website: www.leuphana.de

Leuphana University Lüneburg is a public university in Lüneburg, Lower Saxony, Germany. Leuphana was founded in 1946 as a college of education (German: Pädagogische Hochschule), later expanding to become a university designated as a "foundation under public law." The name Leuphana is derived from an ancient settlement on the Elbe that was mentioned in a 2nd-century geographical world atlas by Ptolemy.

Leuphana has five schools of research, which focus on the fields of education, culture and society, management and technology, sustainability, and public affairs. With nearly 10,000 students, approximately 12% of which are international students.

== History ==
Leuphana was founded in May 1946 as one of eight colleges of education (pädagogische Hochschule' in Lower Saxony, and was renamed in May 1989 from Pädagogische Hochschule Niedersachsen, Abteilung Lüneburg to Lüneburg University.

In 2009, the campus in Suderburg was transferred to the Fachhochschule Braunschweig/Wolfenbüttel (Eastphalian University of Applied Studies).

In 2008, a graduate college was opened that integrates master's degree and doctorate programmes. In addition are a pan-departmental research centre and a professional school for advanced study courses, like business co-operation.

The university opened its Central Building (Zentralgebäude) on March 11, 2017. The building was designed by Daniel Libeskind and cost nearly €100 million to build.

== Institutions ==
Leuphana has five research schools, each of which are made up of several institutes and professorships.

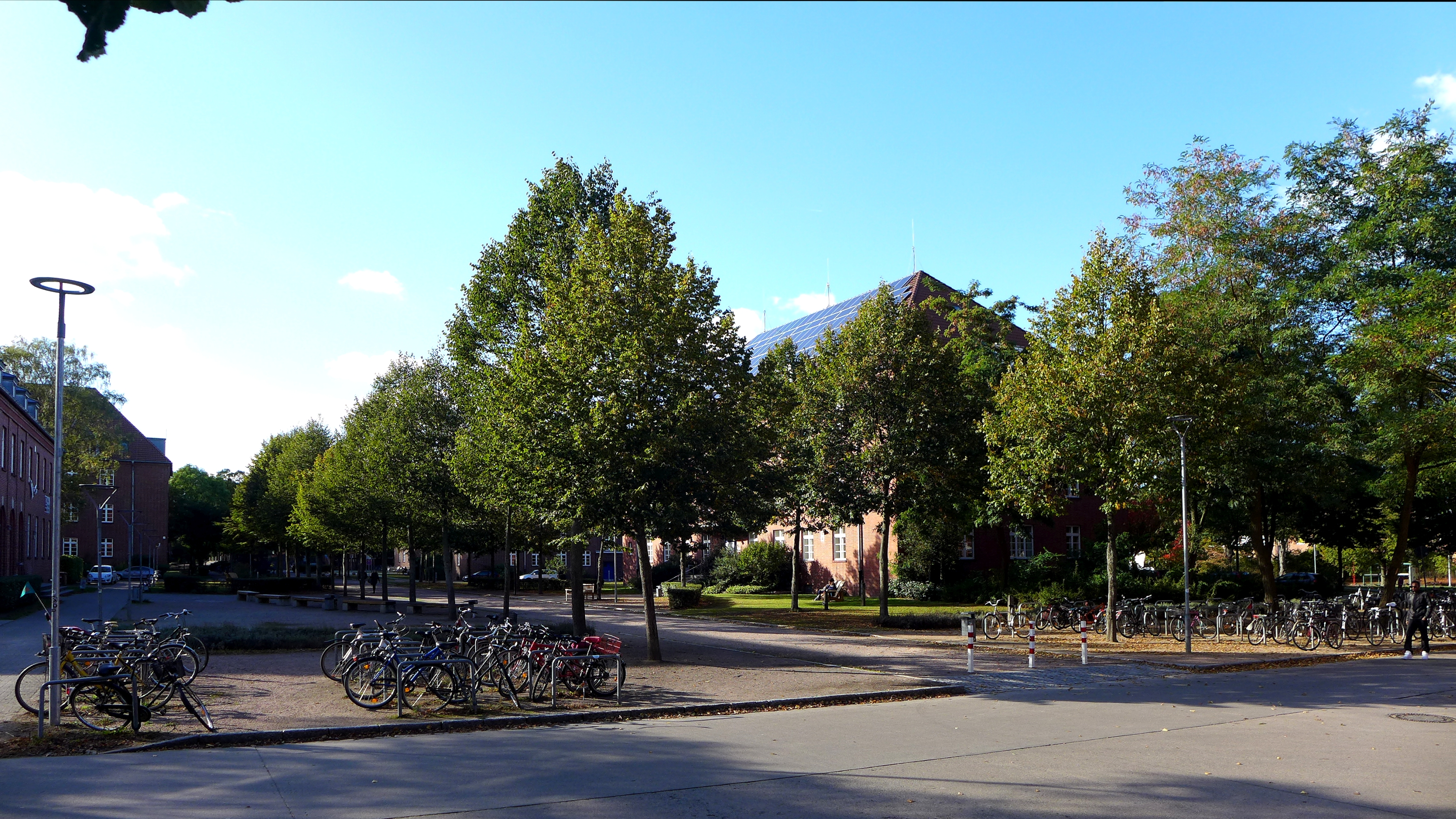
Main street in campus.

=== School of Education ===
- Institute of Educational Sciences
- Institute of the German Language and Literature and Its Didactics
- Institute of English Studies
- Institute of Ethics and Theology
- Institute of Social Work and Social Pedagogy
- Institute of Art, Music and Mediation
- Institute of Mathematics and Its Didactics
- Institute of Exercise, Sports and Health
- Institute of Psychology in Education
- Institute of Social Science Education

=== School of Culture and Society ===
- Institute of Culture and Aesthetics of Digital Media
- Institute of Urban and Cultural Area Research
- Institute of History and Literature Cultures
- Institute of Philosophy and Art History
- Institute of Sociology and Cultural Organization

=== School of Management and Technology ===
- Institute for Auditing and Tax
- Institute for New Venture Management
- Institute of Experimental Industrial Psychology
- Institute of Information Systems
- Institute of Knowledge and Information Management
- Institute of Management, Accounting & Finance
- Institute of Marketing
- Institute of Management and Organization
- Institute of Performance Management
- Institute for Production Technology and Systems

=== School of Sustainability ===
- Centre for Sustainability Management
- Institute of Sustainable Chemistry
- Institute of Ecology
- Social-Ecological Systems Institute
- Institute for Ethics and Transdisciplinary Sustainability Research
- Institute of Sustainability Material Flows and Circularity
- Institute of Sustainability Governance
- Institute of Sustainable Psychology
- Sustainability Education and Transdisciplinary Research Institute

=== School of Public Affairs ===
- Institute of Political Science
- Leuphana Law School
  - Civial Law
  - Public Law
  - Criminal Law
- Institute of Economics

== Notable staff and alumni ==
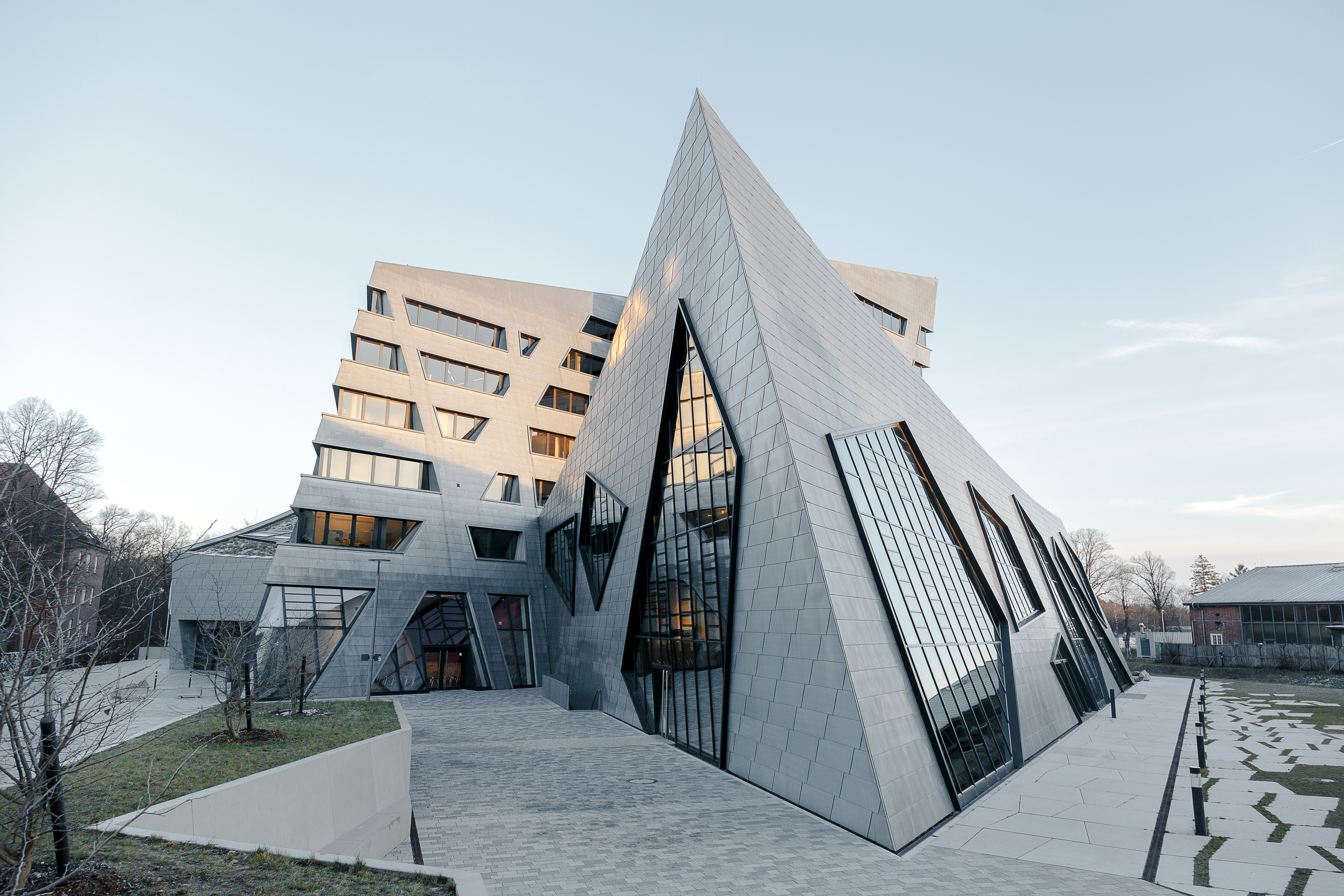
The Central Building, designed by Daniel Libeskind

- Daniel Libeskind, visiting professor
- Britt Reinecke, television talk show host
- Thomas Schomerus, professor of public law
- Jörg Philipp Terhechte, professor and dean
- Tine Wittler, writer, TV presenter and actress

== Rankings ==
University rankings

Overall – Global & National
THE World 2026	401–500	38

In the Times Higher Education World University Rankings of 2025, the university is placed at 401–500th globally and 38th within the country.

Leuphana ranks 7th among the most successful, mid-sized universities for start-ups, according to the Gründungsradar 2025 of the Stifterverband für die Deutsche Wissenschaft.
