= Antonio Molina (cyclist) =

Spanish cyclist (born 1991)

Personal information
- Full name: Antonio Molina Canet
- Born: 4 January 1991 (age 35) Xàbia, Valencian Community, Spain

Cycling career
- Sport: Cycling
- Current team: Retired
- Discipline: Road
- Role: Rider
- Rider type: Climber

Amateur teams
- 2010: Asfaltos Guerola–CA Valencia Terra i Mar
- 2011–2013: Caja Rural amateur

Professional team
- 2014–2019: Caja Rural–Seguros RGA

Antonio Molina Canet (born 4 January 1991) is a Spanish former professional racing cyclist, who competed professionally for the Caja Rural–Seguros RGA team from 2014 to 2019. In August 2018, he was named in the startlist for the Vuelta a España.

== Major results ==
2013
9th Overall Vuelta a la Comunidad de Madrid Under-23
2016
1st Intermediate sprints classification Giro del Trentino
2017
5th Overall Tour du Gévaudan Languedoc-Roussillon
2018
6th Overall Route d'Occitanie

=== Grand Tour general classification results timeline ===
| Grand Tour | 2018 |
|---|---|
| Giro d'Italia | — |
| Tour de France | — |
| Vuelta a España | 120 |

Legend
| — | Did not compete |
| DNF | Did not finish |
