= Ramón Domene =

Spanish cyclist

Personal information
- Full name: Ramón Domene Reyes
- Born: 2 January 1990 (age 36) Villena, Spain

Cycling career
- Sport: Cycling
- Disciplines: Road, Track
- Role: Rider

Amateur teams
- 2011: Androni Giocattoli(stagiaire)
- 2012: Caja Rural (stagiaire)

Professional team
- 2013–2014: Caja Rural

Ramón Domene Reyes (born 2 January 1990) is a Spanish cyclist who last rode for Caja Rural–Seguros RGA.

== Major results ==
=== Road ===
2011
6th Overall Vuelta a la Comunidad de Madrid Sub-23
2012
1st Under-23 National Road Race Championships

=== Track ===
2008
3rd Omnium, Junior World Track Championships
2009
3rd Team pursuit, Cali, World Cup
