= Fernando Grijalba =

Spanish cyclist

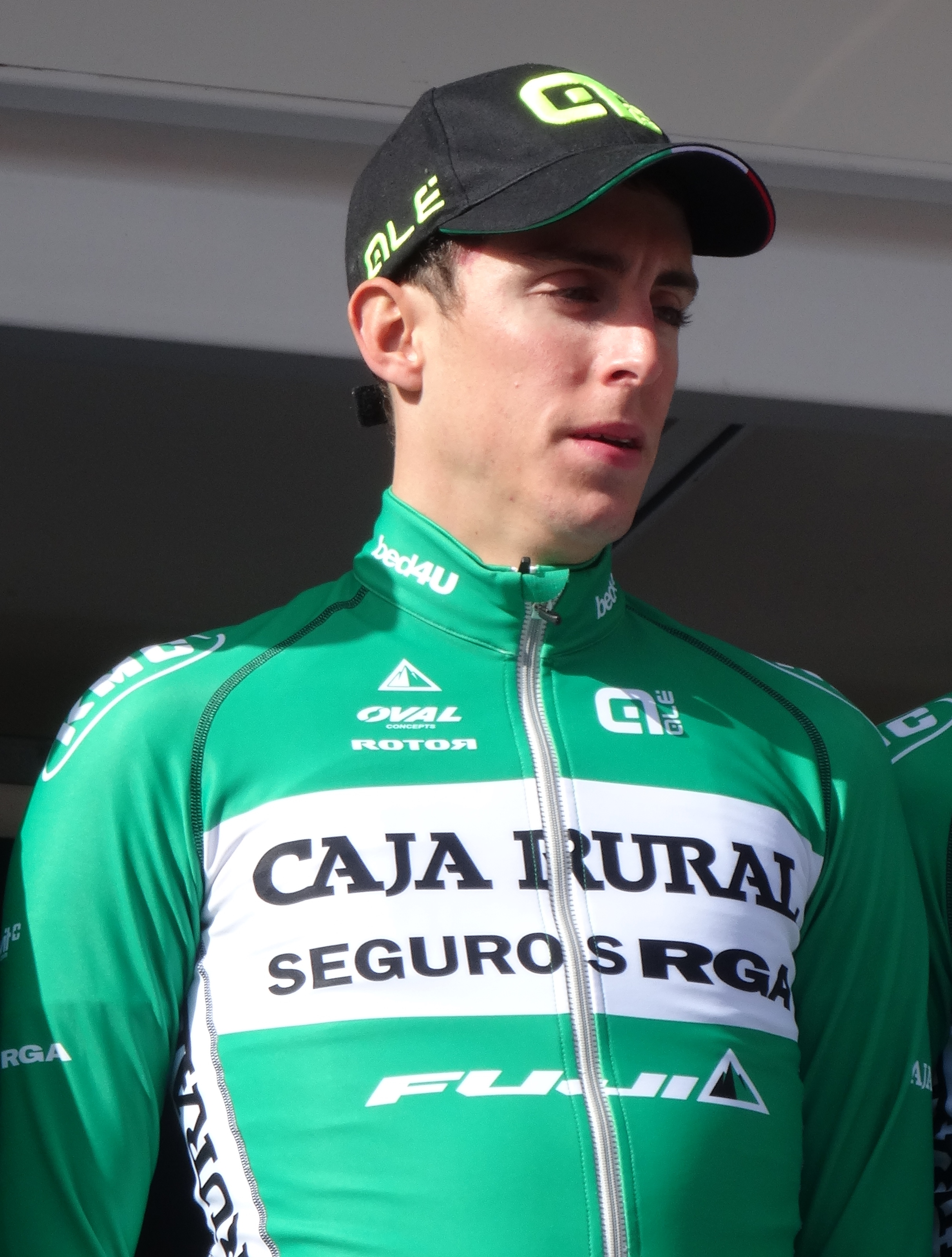
- Fernando Grijalba in 2015

Personal information
- Born: 14 January 1991 (age 35) Valladolid, Spain
- Height: 1.76 m (5 ft 9 in)
- Weight: 61 kg (134 lb)

Cycling career
- Sport: Cycling
- Discipline: Road
- Role: Rider

Amateur teams
- 2010–2011: Naturgas Energía
- 2012–2013: Caja Rural–Seguros RGA amateur
- 2018: Escribano Sport Team
- 2019: Rali Store
- 2020–2021: Atipico Cycling

Professional teams
- 2014–2015: Caja Rural–Seguros RGA
- 2016: Inteja–MMR Dominican Cycling Team
- 2017: Kuwait–Cartucho.es

Fernando Grijalba (born 14 January 1991) is a Spanish former professional racing cyclist.

== Major results ==
2009
1st Time trial, National Junior Road Championships
2014
7th Klasika Primavera
2017
3rd Overall Tour de Filipinas

1st Stage 3
