= Heiner Parra =

Colombian cyclist

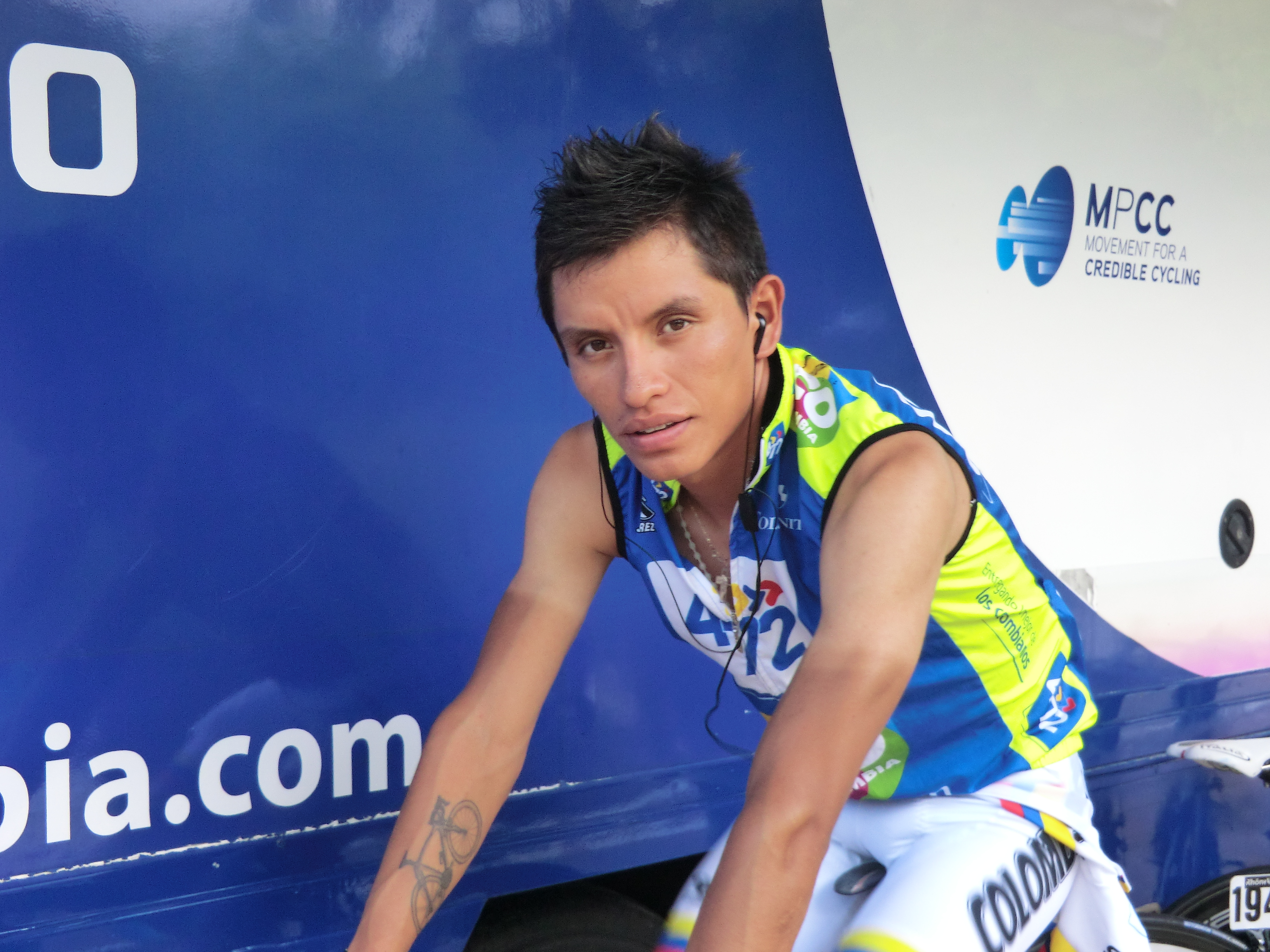
- Parra in 2013

Personal information
- Full name: Heiner Rodrigo Parra Bustamante
- Born: 9 October 1991 (age 35) Sora, Boyacá, Colombia
- Height: 1.60 m (5 ft 3 in)
- Weight: 51 kg (112 lb)

Cycling career
- Sport: Cycling
- Current team: Canel's–Java
- Discipline: Road
- Role: Rider
- Rider type: Climbing specialist

Amateur team
- 2020: Sundark Arawak Eca Team

Professional teams
- 2013: 4-72 Colombia
- 2014–2015: Caja Rural–Seguros RGA
- 2016–2017: Boyacá Raza de Campeones
- 2018–2019: GW–Shimano
- 2021–: Canel's–Zerouno

Heiner Rodrigo Parra Bustamante (born 9 October 1991) is a Colombian professional racing cyclist, who currently rides for UCI Continental team Canel's–Java.

== Major results ==
2013
Ronde de l'Isard

1st Mountains classification
1st Stage 3

5th Overall Tour Alsace
7th Overall Tour de l'Avenir
2016
1st Mountains classification Vuelta a la Comunidad de Madrid
5th Overall GP Internacional Beiras e Serra da Estrela
6th Overall Vuelta a Asturias
2017
1st Stage 8 Clásico RCN
2019
1st Stage 9 Vuelta a Colombia
2021
9th Overall Vuelta a Colombia
2022
5th Overall Tour of the Gila

1st Mountains classification

2023
9th Overall Tour of the Gila

1st Mountains classification
