= Fabricio Ferrari =

Uruguayan bicycle racer

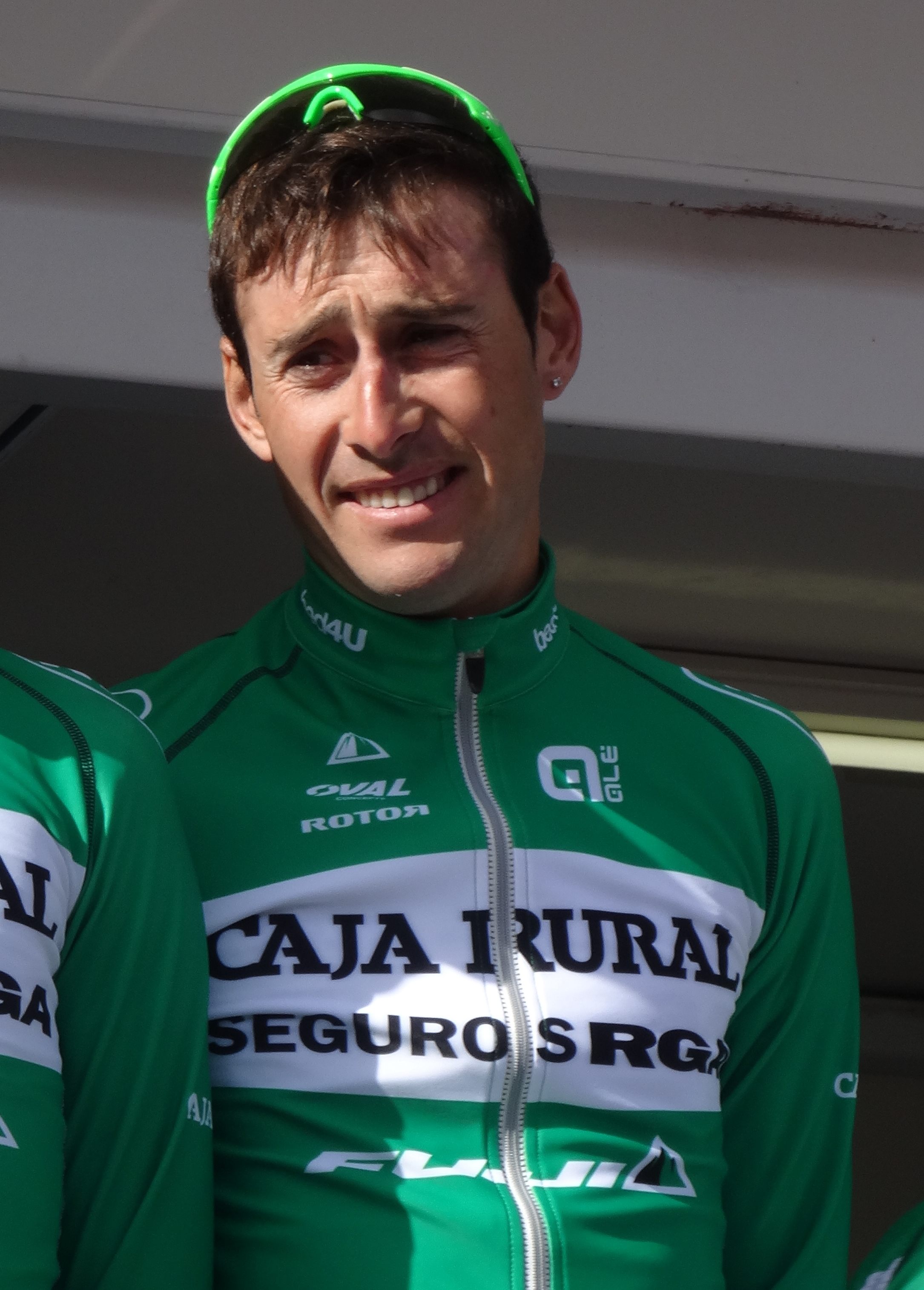
- Ferrari in 2015.

Personal information
- Full name: Fabricio Ferrari Barcelo
- Born: 3 June 1985 (age 41) Santa Lucía, Uruguay
- Height: 1.77 m (5 ft 10 in)
- Weight: 64 kg (141 lb)

Cycling career
- Sport: Cycling
- Current team: Retired
- Discipline: Road
- Role: Rider

Amateur teams
- 2004–2005: Alas Rojas de Santa Lucía
- 2006: Azysa
- 2007–2008: Azpiru–Ugarte
- 2009: Caja Rural amateur

Professional teams
- 2010–2018: Caja Rural
- 2019: Efapel
- 2020: SSOIS Miogee Cycling Team

Fabricio Ferrari Barcelo (born 3 June 1985 in Santa Lucía, Uruguay) is a Uruguayan former professional cyclist, who rode professionally between 2010 and 2020, for Caja Rural–Seguros RGA, Efapel and the SSOIS Miogee Cycling Team. He rode in the 2013 Vuelta a España, finishing in 121st place.

== Major results ==
2005
1st Stage 2 Vuelta Ciclista del Uruguay
3rd Time trial, Pan American Under-23 Road Championships
2008
1st Overall Vuelta al Goierri

1st Stage 1

2009
1st Overall Bizkaiko Bira
2010
4th GP Llodio
2011
1st Mountains classification Volta a Portugal
5th Giro della Romagna
10th Overall Tour of Qinghai Lake
2012
7th Prueba Villafranca-Ordiziako Klasika
2016
5th Overall Vuelta Ciclista Comunidad de Madrid
9th Gran Premio Miguel Indurain
2017
3rd Overall Vuelta a la Comunidad de Madrid
7th Trofeo Matteotti
2020
7th Overall Tour of Serbia
