= Beke (Lippe) =

River in North Rhine-Westphalia, Germany

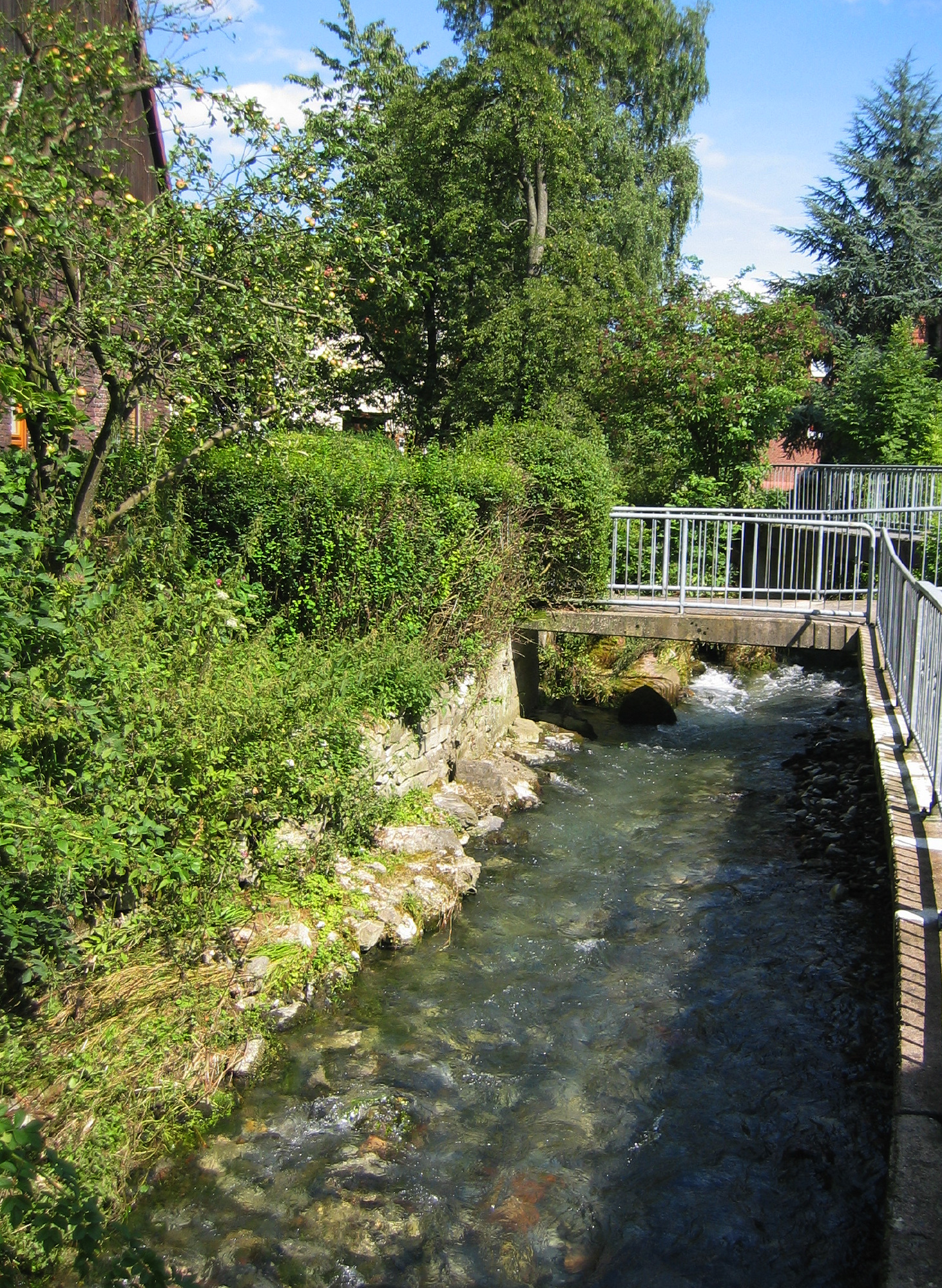

Location
- Country: Germany
- State: North Rhine-Westphalia

Physical characteristics
- Mouth
  - location: Lippe
  - coordinates: 51.7631°N 8.7722°E
- Length: 17.5 km (10.9 mi)

Basin features
- Progression: Lippe→ Rhine→ North Sea

Beke is a river of North Rhine-Westphalia, Germany. It flows into the Lippe near Paderborn.

== See also ==
- List of rivers of North Rhine-Westphalia
