= Salzkotten =

- Town
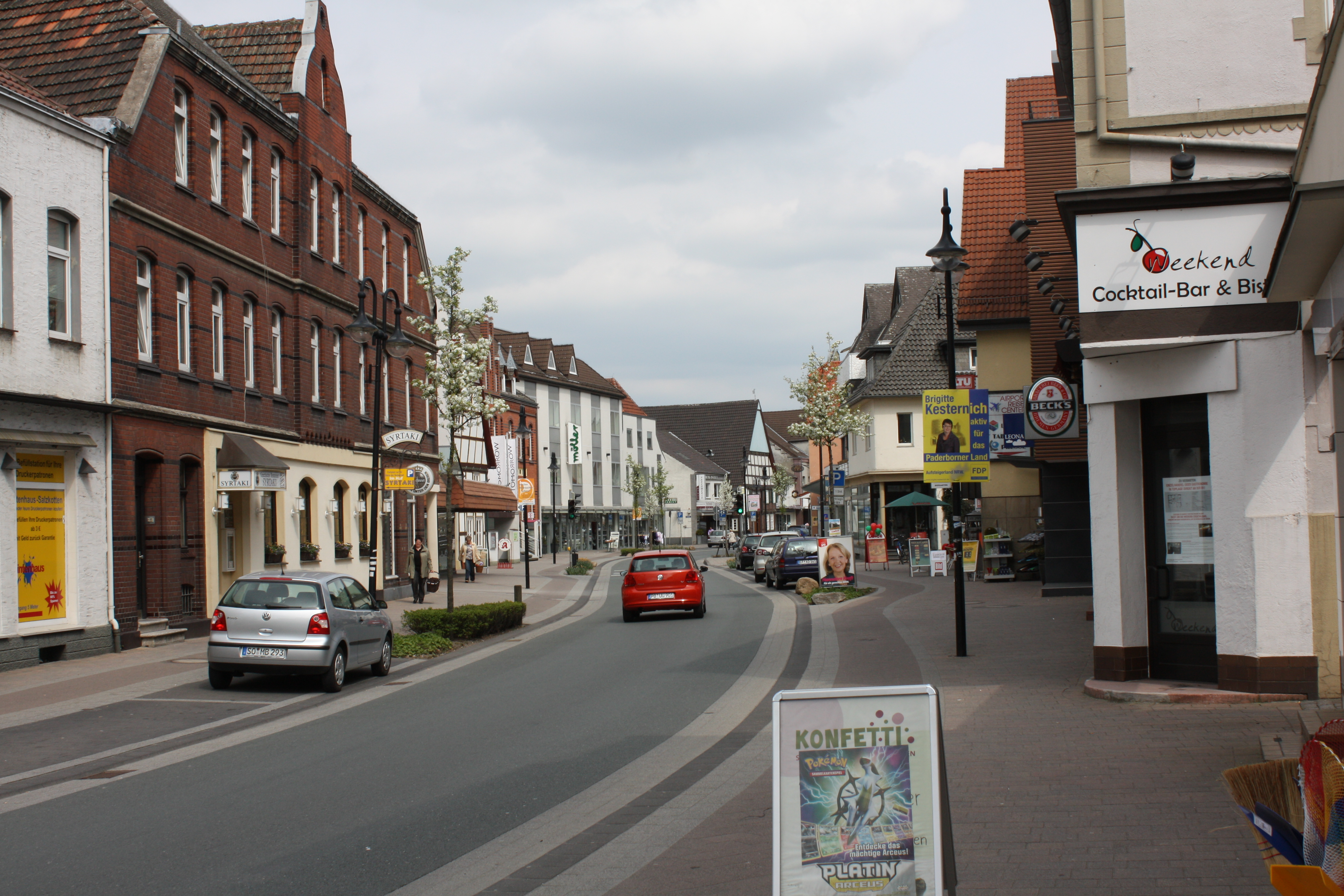
- Street in Salzkotten

- Flag Coat of arms

- Location of Salzkotten within Paderborn district
- Interactive map of Salzkotten
- Location within Germany Location within North Rhine-Westphalia
- Coordinates: 51°40′15″N 08°36′17″E
- Country: Germany
- State: North Rhine-Westphalia
- Admin. region: Detmold
- District: Paderborn
- Subdivisions: 10

Government
  - Mayor (2020–25): Ulrich Berger (CDU)

Area
  - Total: 109.8 km^{2} (42.4 sq mi)
- Elevation: 97 m (318 ft)

Population (2025-12-31)
  - Total: 25,293
  - Density: 230.4/km^{2} (596.6/sq mi)
- Time zone: UTC+01:00 (CET)
  - Summer (DST): UTC+02:00 (CEST)
- Postal codes: 33143–33154
- Dialling codes: 05258; 02955 Niederntudorf; 02948 Mantinghausen, Verlar and parts of Schwelle
- Vehicle registration: PB
- Website: www.salzkotten.de

Salzkotten (German pronunciation: [zaltsˈkɔtn̩]) is a town in the district of Paderborn, in North Rhine-Westphalia, Germany. The name Salzkotten (in English, "Salt cottages") is based in the former salt production, which gave Salzkotten its raison d'être. Salt was found in the salty springs around the town.

== Geography ==
Salzkotten is situated at the border between the flat park landscape of the Münsterland in the north, the Soest Börde in the west and the dry rocky mountains with many forests in the south. It has many small fountains and rivers bringing water from the mountains to the Rhine. It is located approximately 12 km south-west of Paderborn.

=== Administrational division ===
In 1975, the then town of Salzkotten (with nearly 6,000 inhabitants and 23.65 km^{2}) was merged with nine municipalities to form the new town of Salzkotten (nearly 17,000 inhabitants and 109.40 km^{2}):

ward	Administrational division of Salzkotten
Salzkotten	Administrational division of Salzkotten
Mantinghausen	Administrational division of Salzkotten
Niederntudorf	Administrational division of Salzkotten
Oberntudorf	Administrational division of Salzkotten
Scharmede	Administrational division of Salzkotten
Schwelle	Administrational division of Salzkotten
Thüle	Administrational division of Salzkotten
Upsprunge	Administrational division of Salzkotten
Verlar	Administrational division of Salzkotten
Verne	Administrational division of Salzkotten

Schwelle is commonly called United States of Holsen-Schwelle-Winkhausen because of its 3 tiny villages.

== Industry ==
The economy of Salzkotten today focusses upon metal mining and refinery, machine manufacture, electronics, food production and services.

Resident Companies:

Reineke Brot

The bakery Reineke Brot founded in 1889 by Johann and Theresa Reineke and still in the ownership of the family. They bake various types of whole grain wheat, rye and mixed wheat/rye breads as well as some pastries. Their specialty in this area of expertise is bismarks - jelly filled doughnuts. The flour used in their products is locally grown and ground in their own mill which lies in Paderborn. The Company has stopped producing bread and other pastries in Salzkotten due to necessary renovation measures.

Gilbarco Veeder-Root

In 1865, Charles Gilbert and John Barker partnered to build the "Springfield Gas Machine" that converted crude petroleum distillates into a gas vapor used to light buildings. 1910, Gilbert & Barker designed and manufactured their first petroleum pump the T-1, used push-pull motion to draw gasoline from an underground tank for fueling automobiles. Pumps are produced at headquarters Salzkotten, Germany.

== History ==
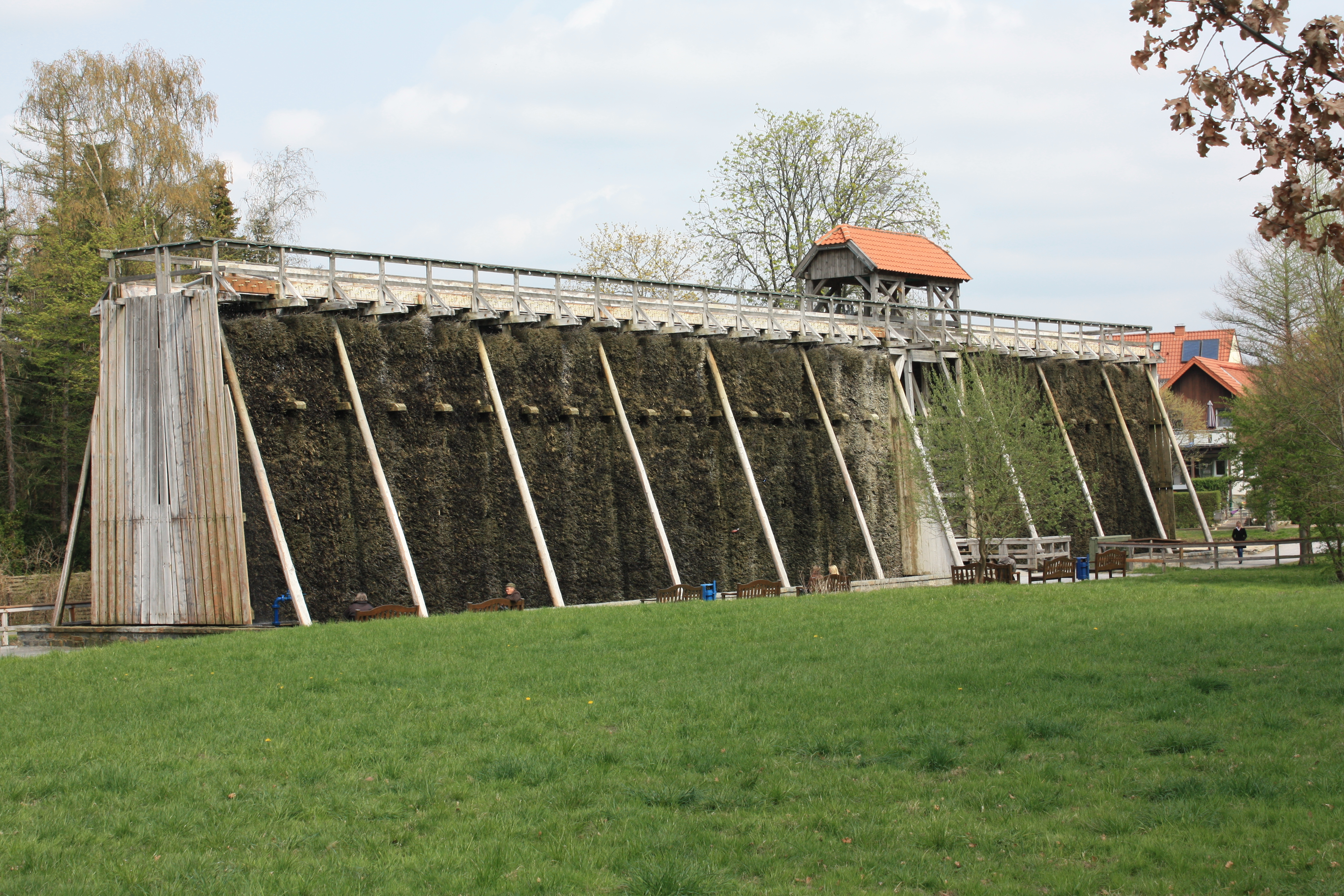
Graduation tower in Salzkotten

Salzkotten was founded in 1247, but documents exist which indicate that salt production was already occurring in 1160. Before the town's foundation, there were a number of farms and villages, which were broken down and rebuilt within the new town walls.

== Mayors ==
- 1975–1984: Franz Cramer (CDU)
- 1984–1989: Josef Ettler (CDU)
- 1989–2004: Konrad Rump (CDU)
- 2004–2014 Michael Dreier (CDU)
- 2014–incumbent Ulrich Berger (CDU)

== Population ==
Historical population

Year	Pop.	±% p.a.
1965	16,186	—
1970	16,341	+0.19%
1975	17,073	+0.88%
1980	18,221	+1.31%
1985	19,228	+1.08%
1990	20,495	+1.28%
1995	22,211	+1.62%

Year	Pop.	±% p.a.
2000	23,501	+1.14%
2005	24,665	+0.97%
2010	24,868	+0.16%
2015	25,186	+0.25%
2020	25,013	−0.14%
2025	25,293	+0.22%

Source: Landesdatabank Nordrhein-Westfalen

== Politics ==
The politics of Salzkotten are dominated by the conservative CDU. Since World War II, the CDU is the biggest party in the town council (German: Stadtrat). Since the 2020 local election, there are 5 groups in the town council (38 seats):

- CDU 56.48% of the votes, 21 seats
- SPD 17.48%, 7 seats
- Alliance 90/The Greens 16.38%, 6 seats
- FDP 5.25%, 2 seats
- AFD 4.42%, 2 seats.

The Mayor of Salzkotten is Ulrich Berger (CDU). He was elected in 2014 with 70.3 of the votes% and was re-elected in 2020 with 93.90 of the votes%

== Culture ==
The town has three significant annual celebrations: the Sälzerfest (salt producers' festival), the Schützenfest (fair featuring shooting matches) and the Hederauenfest. The Schützenfest itself is an event that takes place in many towns and cities across the state.

== Twin towns – sister cities ==
Salzkotten is twinned with:

- Belleville, France
- Brüssow, Germany
- Bystřice pod Hostýnem, Czech Republic
- Cartigny-l'Épinay, France
- Cerisy-la-Forêt, France
- Seefeld in Tirol, Austria

== Notable people ==
- Franz-Joseph Schulze (1918–2005), officer of the Wehrmacht, general of the Bundeswehr
- Laurenz Meyer (born 1948), politician (CDU)
- Andreas Keuser (born 1974), cyclist
- Jörg Philipp Terhechte (born 1975), legal scientist and university professor
