= Lippe (river) =

River in Germany

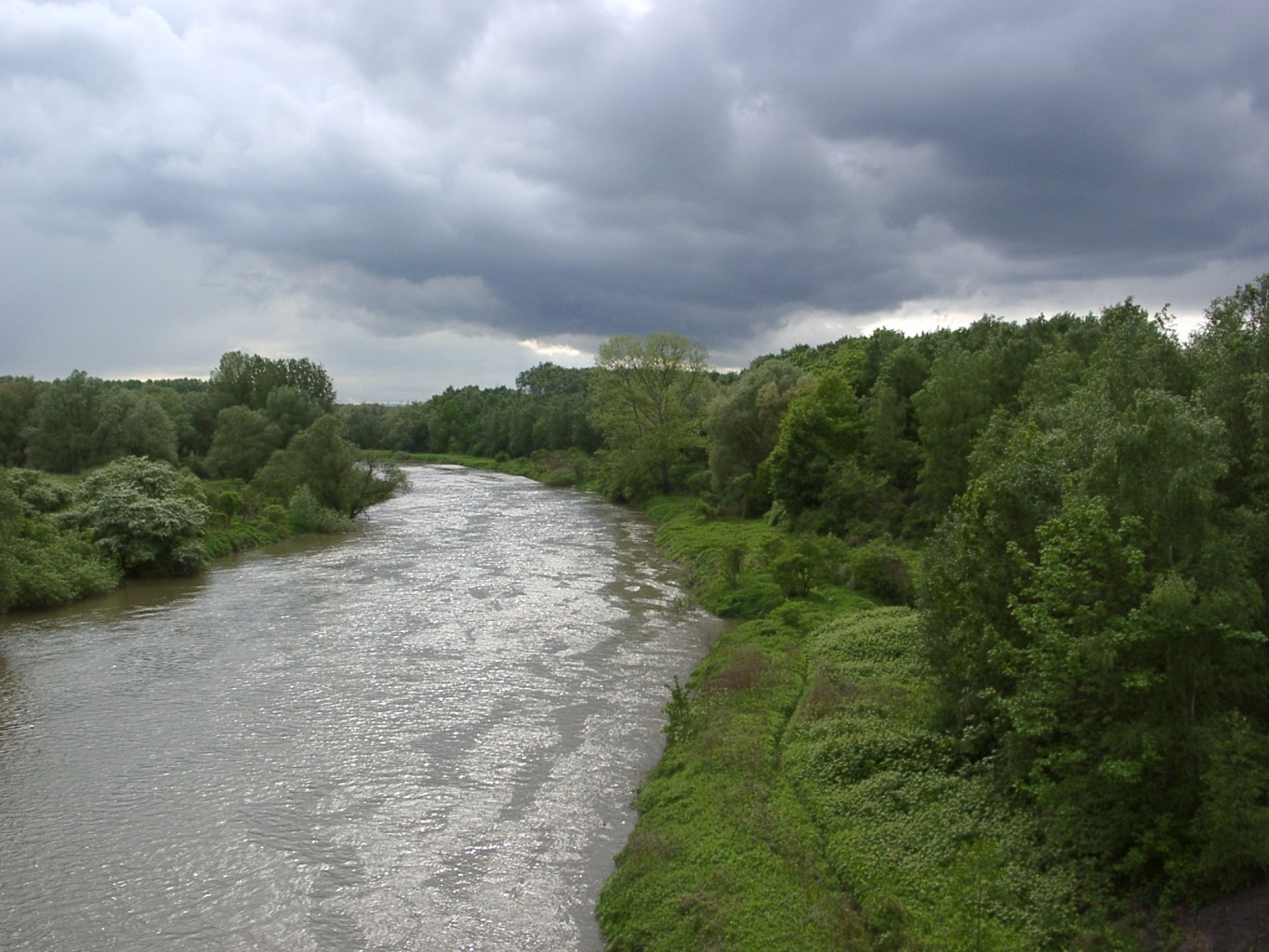
- The Lippe in Lünen

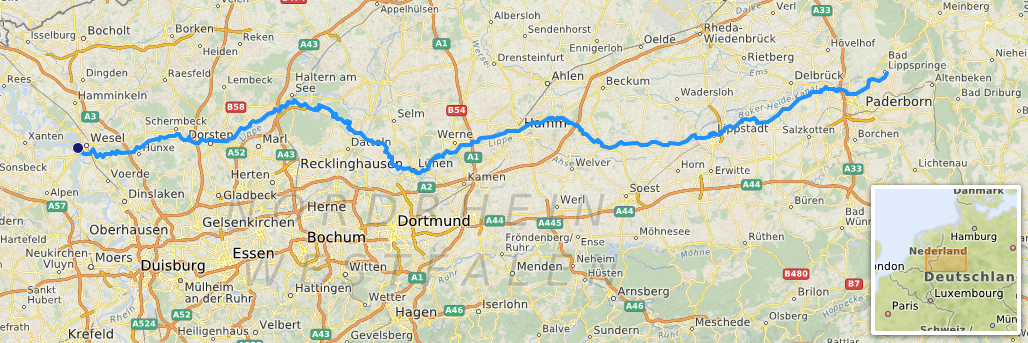

Location
- Country: Germany
- State: North Rhine-Westphalia

Physical characteristics
- Source
  - location: Eastern Westphalia
  - elevation: ±140 m (460 ft)
- Mouth
  - location: Rhine
  - coordinates: 51°39′3″N 6°36′15″E
- Length: 220.3 km (136.9 mi)
- Basin size: 4,889.9 km^{2} (1,888.0 sq mi)

Basin features
- Progression: Rhine→ North Sea
- Tributaries
  - left: Pader, Alme, Ahse, Seseke
  - right: Glenne, Stever

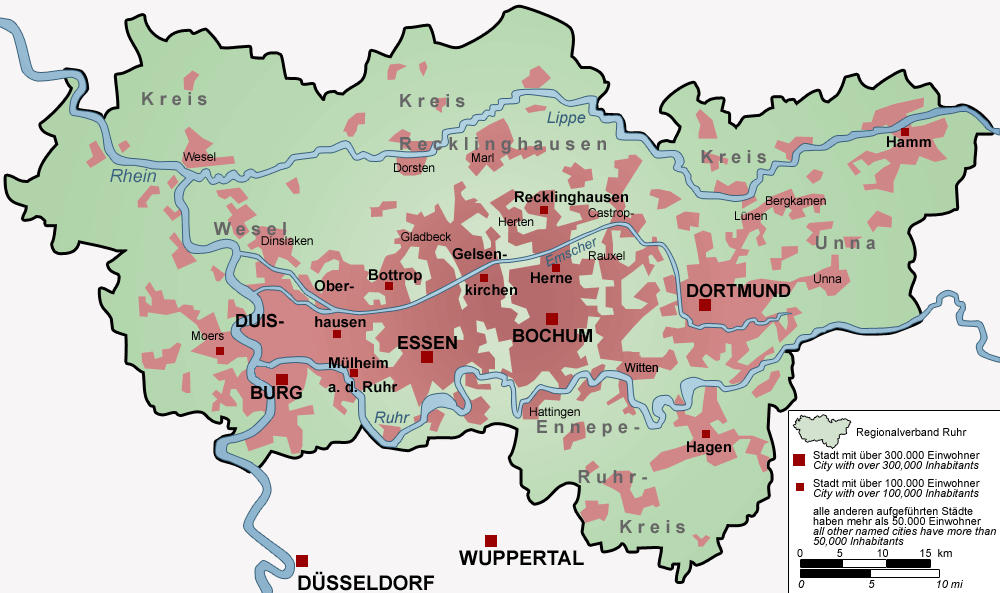
In the Ruhr area, the Lippe River (top) runs east to west, roughly parallel the Ruhr River to the south.

The Lippe (German pronunciation: [ˈlɪpə]) is a river in North Rhine-Westphalia, Germany. It is a right tributary of the Rhine and 220.3 km (136.9 mi) in length with an elevation difference of 125 metres and a catchment area of 4.890 km². The source is located at the edge of the Teutoburg Forest in Bad Lippspringe close to the city of Paderborn. It runs westward through Paderborn, Lippstadt and then along the northern edge of the Ruhr area, parallel to the river Emscher and river Ruhr. The river finally enters the Rhine at Wesel.

== Description and history ==
The river Lippe has been used as an infrastructure in Roman times. For the Romans the river (named Lupia) was a gateway to Germania, running from the river Rhine to the region around Paderborn. The watercourse was used for transport of supplies, so along the banks of the Lippe many former Roman camps could be found. In the last 200 years many of these camps have been identified, above all the camp in Haltern which is likely to be the former headquarter of the imperial prince Tiberius. The distance between the camps is about a one-day walk for the troops, which is almost 30 km (20 mi). Today's identified Roman camps are: Olfen, Xanten, Haltern, Oberaden, Holsterhausen, Anreppen and Beckinghausen. The Battle of the Lupia River was fought in 11 BCE between Nero Claudius Drusus and the Sicambri (Sugambri).

Today, the river appears as a two-tier water course: Upstream, eastward of the city of Hamm, the catchment is more rural. Downstream of Hamm settlements and industrial impacts characterize the situation. Though the Lippe was partly navigable from 1820 on it was not sufficient for the transport of industrial goods.

Historically, the preconditions for a change of the landscape started with the construction of the Cologne-Minden trunk line in the 1840s that connected the river Rhine settlements like Cologne with harbours and trade at the river Weser and so with the Lippe town Hamm, too. Moreover, this railway supported the coal and steel industry development in the northern Ruhr region. The hard coal mining that started in the middle of the 19th century in the Emscher catchment area developed in the following decades direction north and so to the Lippe catchment area. From the 1860s onwards the first problems of mining subsidence and drainage of polluted water appeared. The historical city of Hamm and the towns Lünen, Haltern and Dorsten were small settlements located at the Lippe but expanded with the establishment of hard coal mines starting around 1900. The industrialization caused huge water quality problems in the Lippe tributaries and the Lippe itself; therefore first in 1913 the Sesekegenossenschaft and later in 1926 the Lippeverband (“Wasserwirtschaftsverbände”) were established as water boards. Since 1914 the Datteln-Hamm Canal and 1930 the Wesel-Datteln Canal are located in parallel to the Lippe which is not navigable for mass transportation. The canals receive Lippe water or feed the Lippe (to improve dry weather flow) from an exchange facility in Hamm, operated by the Wasserverband Westdeutsche Kanäle.

Until the 1970s water pollution played no important role in the public debate but the environmental policy changed over the decades. Environmental standards on national level and especially from the EU have been leading to enormous efforts to improve the natural standards and today a couple of positive developments can be stated, like new FFH (Flora Fauna Habitat) sites and governmental initiatives around the WFD (Water Framework Directive).

=== Tributaries ===
The main tributaries of the Lippe are (from source to mouth):

- Left: Steinbeke, Beke, Pader, Alme, Heder, Brandenbaumer Bach, Gieseler, Trotzbach, Ahse, Seseke, Sickingmühlenbach
- Right: Thunebach, Thune, Glenne, Baagebach, Quabbe, Geinegge, Stever

=== Cities and towns ===
- Towns: Wesel, Dorsten, Marl, Lünen and Haltern
- Cities: Paderborn, Lippstadt and Hamm
