= 2019 national road cycling championships =

The 2019 national road cycling championships will be held throughout the year and are organised by the UCI member federations. They began in New Zealand with the time trial event (both men and women) on 4 January, as is tradition.

== Jerseys ==
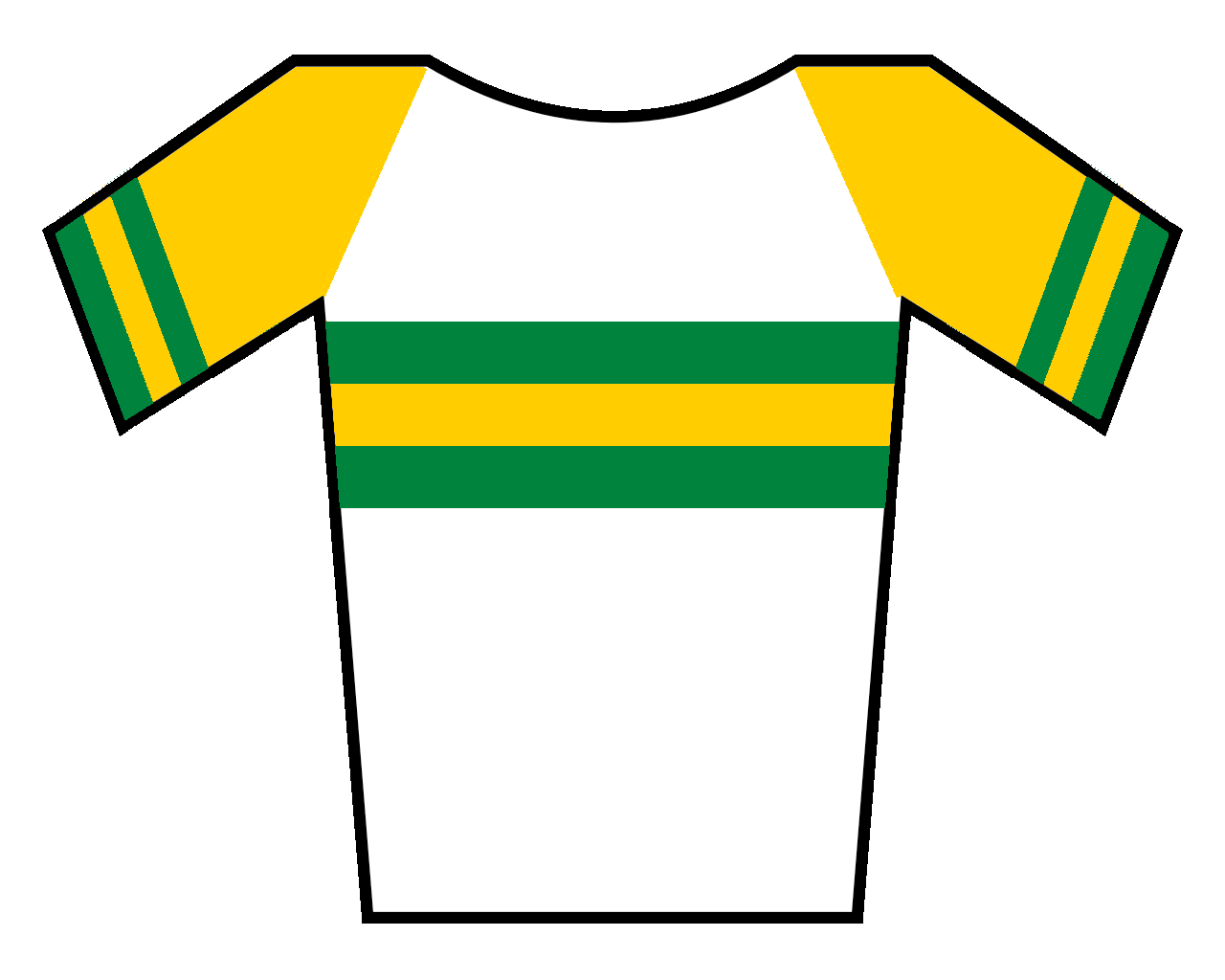
Australian Champion

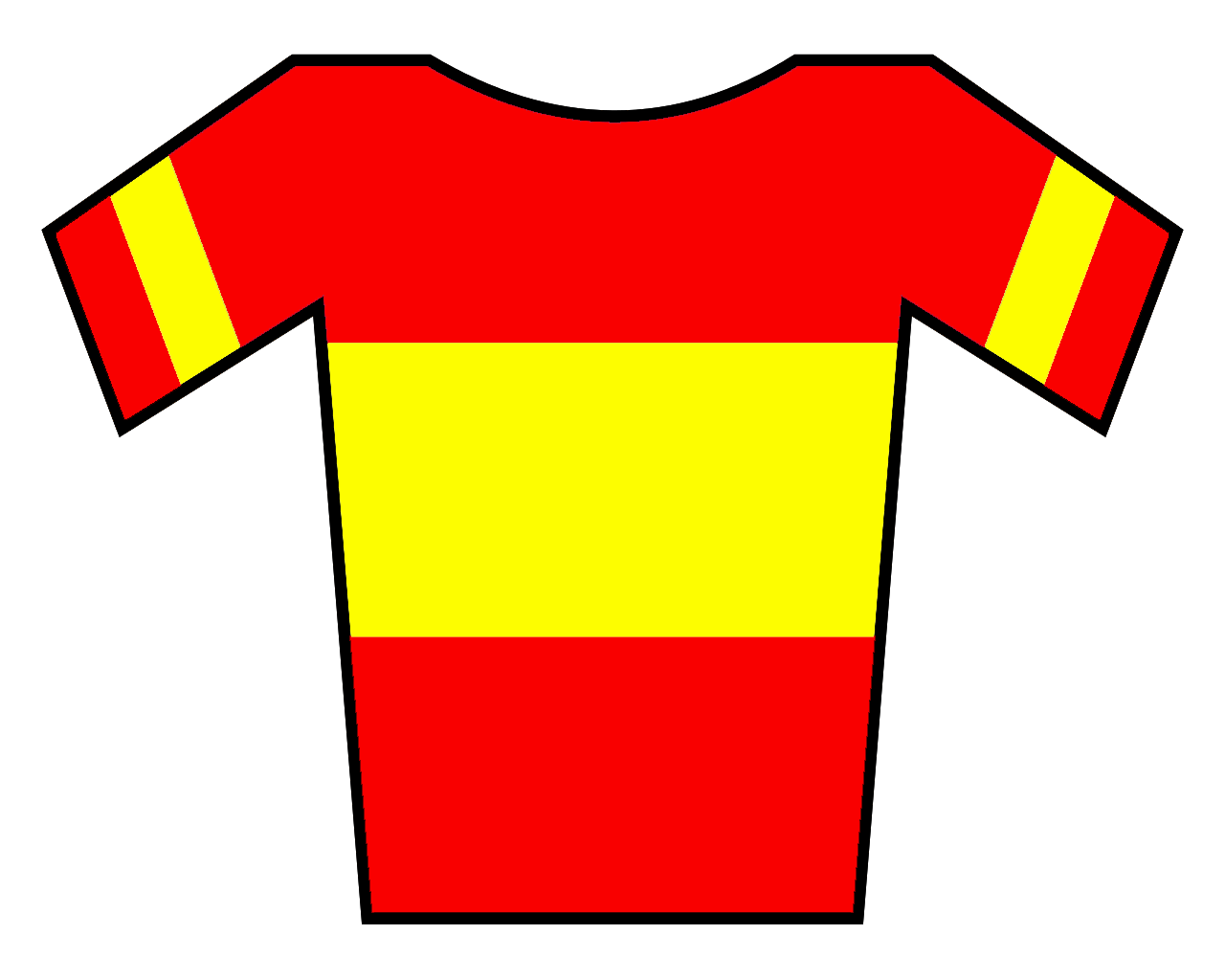
Spanish Champion

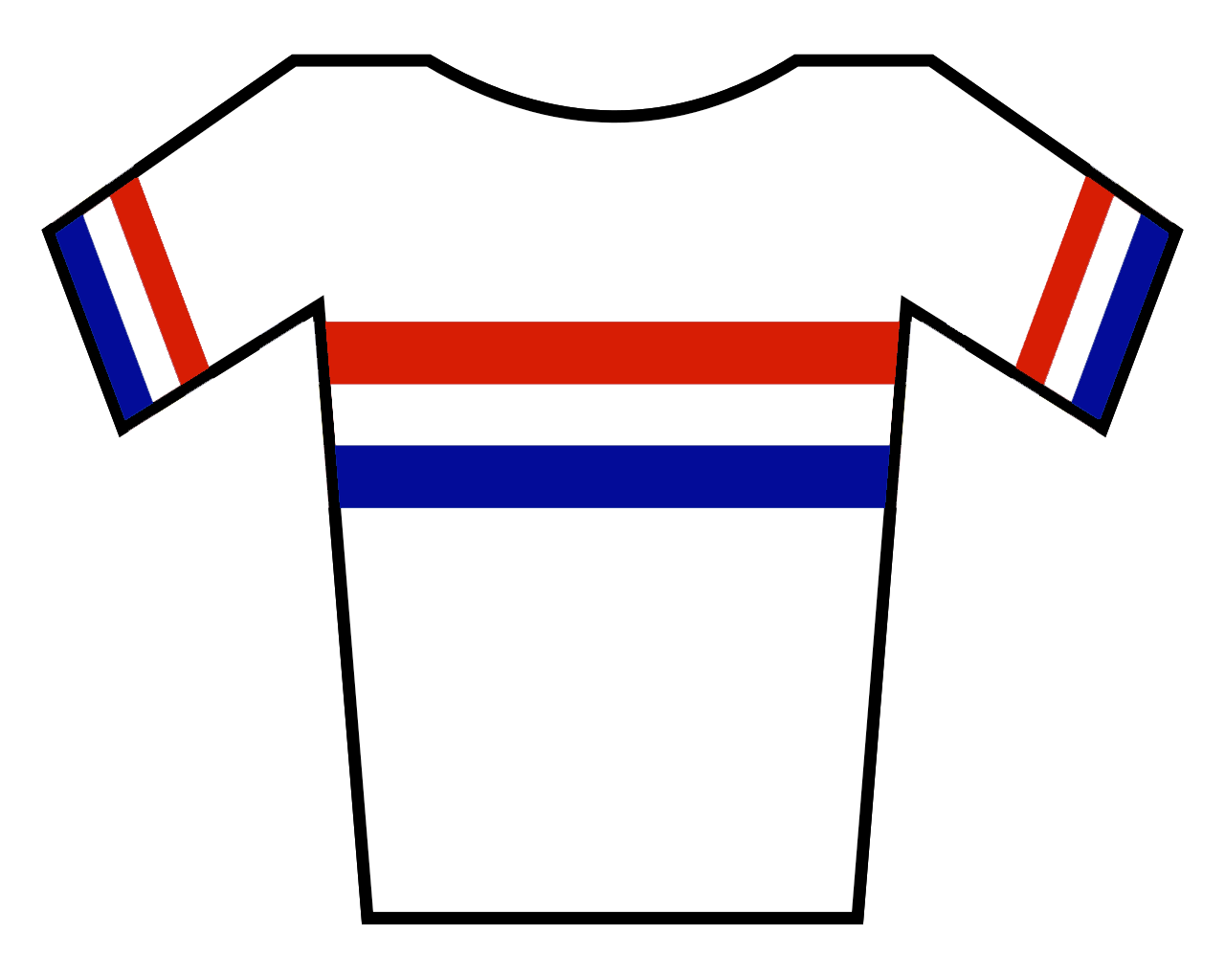
British
Champion

The winner of each national championship wears the national jersey in all their races for the next year in the respective discipline, apart from the World Championships and the Olympics, or unless they are wearing a category leader's jersey in a stage race. Most national champion jerseys tend to represent a country's flag or use the colours from it. Jerseys may also feature traditional sporting colours of a country that are not derived from a national flag, such as the green and gold on the jerseys of Australian national champions.

== 2019 champions ==
=== Men's Elite ===
Country	Men's Elite Road Race Champion	Road Race Champion's Team	Men's Elite Time Trial Champion	Time Trial Champion's Team
Antigua and Barbuda	Conor Delanbanque		Robert Marsh	
Albania	Ylber Sefa	Tarteletto–Isorex	Ylber Sefa	Tarteletto–Isorex
Algeria	Abderrahmane Bechlaghem	Sovac	Youcef Reguigui	Terengganu Inc. TSG
Angola	Hélder Silva	BAI–Sicasal–Petro de Luanda	Dário António	BAI–Sicasal–Petro de Luanda
Argentina	Maximiliano Richeze	Deceuninck–Quick-Step	Juan Pablo Dotti	Sindicato de Empleados Publicos de San Juan
Australia	Michael Freiberg	Sunshine Coast Team	Luke Durbridge	Mitchelton–Scott
Austria	Patrick Konrad	Bora–Hansgrohe	Matthias Brändle	Israel Cycling Academy
Azerbaijan	Elchin Asadov	Lviv Cycling Team	Elchin Asadov	Lviv Cycling Team
Bahamas	Anthony Colebrook		Lorin Sawyer	
Barbados	Gregory Vanderpool		Joshua Kelly	Hennebont Cyclisme
Belarus	Yauheni Sobal	Minsk Cycling Club	Yauheni Sobal	Minsk Cycling Club
Belgium	Tim Merlier	Corendon–Circus	Wout van Aert	Team Jumbo–Visma
Belize	Edgar Nissan Arana		Oscar Quiros	
Bolivia	Bernardo León	Start Cycling Team	Basílio Ramos	
Bosnia and Herzegovina	Nedžad Mahmić		Vedad Karić	
Botswana	Abeng Malete		Abeng Malete	
Burkina Faso	Salfo Bikienga	AS Bessel		
Brazil	Vitor Zucco Schizzi	CCB Racing	Andre Eduardo Gohr	
British Virgin Islands	Zambezi Richardson		Philippe Leroy	
Canada	Adam de Vos	Rally UHC Cycling	Rob Britton	Rally UHC Cycling
Cayman Islands	Jerome Ameline		Patrick Harfield	
Chile	Felipe Andrés Peñaloza Yánez		José Luis Rodríguez Aguilar	
China	Chaohua Xue		Hang Shi	Giant Cycling Team
Colombia	Óscar Quiroz	Coldeportes Bicicletas Strongman	Daniel Martínez	EF Education First
Costa Rica	Felipe Nystrom	Western Bikewords	Bryan Salas	Nestlé-7C-CBZ Asfaltos-Giant
Croatia	Josip Rumac	Androni Giocattoli–Sidermec	Josip Rumac	Androni Giocattoli–Sidermec
Cuba	Felix Nodarse		Juan Carlos Arias	
Curaçao	Gyasi Sulvaran		Manuel Seintje	
Cyprus	Andreas Miltiadis	Guerciotti–Kiwi Atlantico	Andreas Miltiadis	Guerciotti–Kiwi Atlantico
Czech Republic	František Sisr	Elkov Author	Jan Bárta	Elkov–Author
Denmark	Michael Mørkøv	Deceuninck–Quick-Step	Kasper Asgreen	Deceuninck–Quick-Step
Ecuador	Jonathan Kléver Caicedo	EF Education First	Jonathan Kléver Caicedo	EF Education First
Eritrea	Natnael Berhane	Cofidis	Amanuel Ghebreigzabhier	Team Dimension Data
El Salvador	Vladimir Orellana	Timing4Pros	José Dagoberto Joya	
Estonia	Alo Jakin	St. Michel–Auber93	Rein Taaramäe	Total Direct Énergie
Ethiopia	Negasi Abreha		Tsgabu Grmay	Mitchelton–Scott
Fiji	Jone Takape		Steve Nutley	
Finland	Arto Vainionpää		Ukko Iisakki Peltonen	
France	Warren Barguil	Arkéa–Samsic	Benjamin Thomas	Groupama–FDJ
Georgia	Tornike Khabazi		Tornike Khabazi	
Germany	Maximilian Schachmann	Bora–Hansgrohe	Tony Martin	Team Jumbo–Visma
Guatemala	Mardoqueo Vásquez	Cuajo Luna Universal Foods	Manuel Rodas	
Guyana	Jamal John		Briton John	
Honduras	Luis Enrique Lopez Nolasco	Opticas de Luxe-Ninosport	Luis Enrique Lopez Nolasco	Opticas de Luxe-Ninosport
Hong Kong	Cheung King Lok	HKSI Pro Cycling Team	Ka Hoo Fung	HKSI Pro Cycling Team
Hungary	Gergely Szarka		Attila Valter	CCC Development Team
Iceland	Birkir Ingvason		Ingvar Ómarsson	
India	Punay Pratap Singh		Naveen John	
Indonesia	Jamalidin Novardianto	PGN Road Cycling Team	Aiman Cahyadi	PGN Road Cycling Team
Iran	Mehdi Sohrabi		Saeeid Safarzadeh	Tianyoude Hotel Cycling Team
Ireland	Sam Bennett	Bora–Hansgrohe	Ryan Mullen	Trek–Segafredo
Israel	Guy Sagiv	Israel Cycling Academy	Guy Niv	Israel Cycling Academy
Italy	Davide Formolo	Bora–Hansgrohe	Filippo Ganna	Team Ineos
Jamaica	Russell Small		Phillip McCatty	
Japan	Shōtarō Iribe	Shimano Racing Team	Nariyuki Masuda	Utsunomiya Blitzen
Kazakhstan	Alexey Lutsenko	Astana	Alexey Lutsenko	Astana
Latvia	Toms Skujiņš	Trek–Segafredo	Krists Neilands	Israel Cycling Academy
Lithuania	Ramūnas Navardauskas	Delko–Marseille Provence	Gediminas Bagdonas	AG2R La Mondiale
Luxembourg	Bob Jungels	Deceuninck–Quick-Step	Bob Jungels	Deceuninck–Quick-Step
Malaysia	Nur Amirul Fakhruddin Mazuki	Terengganu Inc. TSG	Muhsin Al Redha Misbah	Team Sapura Cycling
Mali	Yaya Diallo			
Malta	Alexander Smyth		Etienne Bonnello	
Moldova	Cristian Raileanu	Team Sapura Cycling	Cristian Raileanu	Team Sapura Cycling
Mexico	Ignacio de Jesús Prado	Canels Specialized	Luis Villalobos	Aevolo
Mongolia	Narankhuu Baterdene		Enkhtavan Bolor-Erdene	
Montenegro			Danilo Vukcevic	
Mauritius	Dylan Redy	Team Fybolia-Locminé Auto	Christopher Rougier-Lagane	Faucon Flacq SC-KFC
Namibia	Alex Miller		Drikus Coetzee	
Netherlands	Fabio Jakobsen	Deceuninck–Quick-Step	Jos van Emden	Team Jumbo–Visma
New Zealand	James Fouché	Team Wiggins Le Col	Patrick Bevin	CCC Team
Nicaragua	Oscar Danilo Hernandez Gonzalez		José Joel Caballero	
Macau	Andrej Petrovski	Velo-M Termalift	Andrej Petrovski	Velo-M Termalift
Norway	Amund Grøndahl Jansen	Team Jumbo–Visma	Andreas Leknessund	Uno-X Norwegian Development Team
Panama	Jorge Castel		Cristopher Robin Jurado	
Paraguay	Francisco Daniel Riveros Diarte		Víctor Manuel Grange González	
Poland	Michał Paluta	CCC Development Team	Maciej Bodnar	Bora–Hansgrohe
Portugal	José Mendes	Sporting CP/Tavira	José Gonçalves	Team Katusha–Alpecin
Puerto Rico	Abner González	Inteja Imca–Ridea	Luis Molina	
Qatar	Marwan Al Jalham		Fadhel Al Khater	
Romania	Denis Marian Vulcan	Giotti Victoria–Palomar	Serghei Țvetcov	Floyd's Pro Cycling
Russia	Aleksandr Vlasov	Gazprom–RusVelo	Artem Ovechkin	Terengganu Cycling Team
Rwanda	Bonaventure Uwizeyimana	Benediction Excel Energy	Joseph Areruya	Delko-Marseille Provence
Serbia	Dušan Rajović	Adria Mobil	Ognjen Ilić	
Singapore	Choon Huat Goh	Terengganu Inc. TSG	Choon Huat Goh	Terengganu Inc. TSG
Slovakia	Juraj Sagan	Bora–Hansgrohe	Ján Andrej Cully	Dukla Banská Bystrica
Slovenia	Domen Novak	Bahrain–Merida	Tadej Pogačar	UAE Team Emirates
Spain	Alejandro Valverde	Movistar Team	Jonathan Castroviejo	Team Ineos
Sweden	Lucas Eriksson	Riwal Readynez	Tobias Ludvigsson	Groupama–FDJ
Switzerland	Sébastien Reichenbach	Groupama–FDJ	Stefan Küng	Groupama–FDJ
South Africa	Daryl Impey	Mitchelton–Scott	Daryl Impey	Mitchelton–Scott
Taiwan	Shao Hsuan Lu		Chun Kai Feng	Bahrain–Merida
Thailand	Jetsada Janluang	Thailand Continental Cycling Team	Jetsada Janluang	Thailand Continental Cycling Team
Togo	Hamza Assoumanou			
Trinidad and Tobago	Tyler Cole		Tyler Cole	
Tunisia	Hassen Ben Nasser		Ali Nouisri	
Turkey	Ahmet Örken	Salcano Sakarya BB Team	Ahmet Örken	Salcano Sakarya BB Team
Ukraine	Andriy Kulyk	Shenzhen Xidesheng Cycling Team	Mark Padun	Bahrain–Merida
United Arab Emirates	Yousif Mirza	UAE Team Emirates	Yousif Mirza	UAE Team Emirates
Uzbekistan	Muradjan Halmuratov		Muradjan Halmuratov	
United Kingdom	Ben Swift	Team Ineos	Alex Dowsett	Team Katusha–Alpecin
United States	Alex Howes	EF Education First	Ian Garrison	Hagens Berman Axeon
Uruguay	Pablo Anchieri		Jorge Soto	
Uzbekistan	Muradjan Halmuratov		Muradjan Halmuratov	
Venezuela	Jesús Villegas	Gios Kiwi Atlántico	Orluis Aular	Matrix Powertag

==== Champions in UCI WorldTour teams ====
Team	Road Race Champions	Time Trial Champions
AG2R La Mondiale		Gediminas Bagdonas (LTU)
Astana	Alexey Lutsenko (KAZ)	Alexey Lutsenko (KAZ)
Bahrain–Merida	Domen Novak (SLO)	Feng Chun-kai (TWN); Mark Padun (UKR)
Bora–Hansgrohe	Patrick Konrad (AUT); Maximilian Schachmann (GER); Sam Bennett (IRL); Davide Formolo (ITA); Juraj Sagan (SVK)	Maciej Bodnar (POL)
CCC Team		Patrick Bevin (NZL)
Deceuninck–Quick-Step	Maximiliano Richeze (ARG); Michael Mørkøv (DEN); Bob Jungels (LUX); Fabio Jakobsen (NED)	Kasper Asgreen (DEN); Bob Jungels (LUX)
EF Education First	Jonathan Kléver Caicedo (ECU); Alex Howes (USA)	Daniel Martínez (COL); Jonathan Kléver Caicedo (ECU)
Groupama–FDJ	Sébastien Reichenbach (SUI)	Benjamin Thomas (FRA); Stefan Küng (SUI)
Lotto–Soudal		
Mitchelton–Scott	Daryl Impey (RSA)	Luke Durbridge (AUS); Tsgabu Grmay (ETH); Daryl Impey (RSA)
Movistar Team	Alejandro Valverde (ESP)	
Team Dimension Data		Amanuel Ghebreigzabhier (ERI)
Team Ineos	Ben Swift (GBR)	Filippo Ganna (ITA); Jonathan Castroviejo (ESP)
Team Jumbo–Visma	Amund Grøndahl Jansen (NOR)	Wout van Aert (BEL); Tony Martin (GER); Jos van Emden (NED)
Team Katusha–Alpecin		Alex Dowsett (GBR); José Gonçalves (POR)
Team Sunweb		
Trek–Segafredo	Toms Skujiņš (LVA)	Ryan Mullen (IRL)
UAE Team Emirates	Yousif Mirza (UAE)	Tadej Pogačar (SLO); Yousif Mirza (UAE)

=== Women's Elite ===
Country	Women's Elite Road Race Champion	Road Race Champion's Team	Women's Elite Time Trial Champion	Time Trial Champion's Team
Antigua and Barbuda	Lindsay Duffy			
Argentina	Carolina Pérez		Fiorella Malaspina	
Australia	Sarah Gigante	Roxsolt Attaquer	Grace Brown	Mitchelton–Scott
Austria	Anna Kiesenhofer		Anna Kiesenhofer	
Barbados	Krissi McKinney		Krissi McKinney	
Belarus	Tatsiana Sharakova	Minsk Cycling Club	Tatsiana Sharakova	Minsk Cycling Club
Belgium	Jesse Vandenbulcke	Doltcini–Van Eyck Sport	Lotte Kopecky	Lotto–Soudal Ladies
Belize			Kaya Cattouse	
Botswana	Matshediso Ebudilwe		Nonofo Maswabi	
Brazil	Danilas Silva	Avulso	Tamires Fanny Radatz	
Canada	Karol-Ann Canuel	Boels–Dolmans	Leah Kirchmann	Team Sunweb
Chile	Denisse Aracely Ahumada Riquelme		Constanza Victoria Paredes Martínez	
Colombia	Blanca Liliana Moreno	Astana	Sérika Gulumá	
Croatia	Maja Perinović	Top Girls Fassa Bortolo	Mia Radotić	BTC City Ljubljana
Cuba	Arlenis Sierra	Astana	Arlenis Sierra	Astana
Cyprus	Antri Christoforou	Cogeas–Mettler–Look	Antri Christoforou	Cogeas–Mettler–Look
Denmark	Amalie Dideriksen	Boels–Dolmans	Louise Norman Hansen	Team Waoo
Dominican Republic	Juana Isidra Fernandez			
Ecuador	Miryam Maritza Nuñez			
El Salvador			Xenia Estrada	
Eritrea	Shama Fitsum			
Estonia	Liisa Ehrberg		Liisi Rist	
Finland	Pia Pensaari		Minna-maria Kangas	
France	Jade Wiel	FDJ Nouvelle-Aquitaine Futuroscope	Séverine Eraud	Doltcini–Van Eyck Sport
Germany	Lisa Brennauer	WNT–Rotor Pro Cycling	Lisa Klein	Canyon//SRAM
Guyana			Denise Jeffrey	
Honduras	Karen Elisa Amaya		Angie De Jesus Gomez	
Hong Kong	Qianyu Yang		Wing Yee Leung	
Hungary	Zsófia Szabó	Health Mate–Cyclelive Team	Veronika Anna Kormos	Health Mate–Cyclelive Team
Iceland	Agusta Edda Björnsdottir		Agusta Edda Björnsdottir	
Ireland	Alice Sharpe	WCC Team	Kelly Murphy	Storey Racing
Israel	Omer Shapira	Canyon//SRAM	Rotem Gafinovitz	Canyon//SRAM
Italy			Elena Cecchini	Canyon//SRAM
Japan	Eri Yonamine	Alé–Cipollini	Eri Yonamine	Alé–Cipollini
Kazakhstan	Svetlana Pachshenko	Astana	Makhabbat Umutzhanova	Astana
Latvia	Lija Laizāne	Eneicat	Dana Rožlapa	
Lithuania	Silvija Pacevičienė		Kataržina Sosna	
Luxembourg	Christine Majerus	Boels–Dolmans	Christine Majerus	Boels–Dolmans
Malaysia	Ju Pha Somnet			
Mexico	Ariadna Gutiérrez	Swapit–Agolíco		
Mongolia	Anujin Jinjiibadam		Solongo Tserenlkham	
Namibia			Vera Adrian	
Netherlands	Lorena Wiebes	Parkhotel Valkenburg	Annemiek van Vleuten	Mitchelton–Scott
New Zealand	Georgia Catterick	Mike Greer Homes	Georgia Williams	Mitchelton–Scott
Nicaragua			Maria José Silva	
Norway	Ingrid Lorvik	Hitec Products–Birk Sport	Vita Heine	Hitec Products–Birk Sport
Panama	Shaina Rodriguez		Argelis Judith Bernal	
Paraguay	Silvia Maria Rodas Maldonado		Silvia Maria Rodas Maldonado	
Philippines	Marella Vania Salamat		Jermyn Prado	
Poland	Łucja Pietrzak		Anna Plichta	Trek–Segafredo
Portugal	Daniela Reis	Doltcini–Van Eyck Sport	Daniela Reis	Doltcini–Van Eyck Sport
Puerto Rico			Donelys Carinño	
Romania	Ana Covrig	Eurotarget–Bianchi–Vittoria	Ana Covrig	Eurotarget–Bianchi–Vittoria
Russia	Alexandra Goncharova	Servetto–Piumate–Beltrami TSA		
Rwanda			Josiane Mukashema	
Serbia			Jelena Erić	Alé–Cipollini
Singapore			Yi Wei Luo	
Slovakia			Tatiana Jaseková	
Slovenia			Eugenia Bujak	BTC City Ljubljana
Sweden	Lisa Nordén		Lisa Nordén	
Switzerland	Marlen Reusser	WCC Team	Marlen Reusser	WCC Team
Spain	Lourdes Oyarbide	Movistar Team	Sheyla Gutiérrez	Movistar Team
South Africa	Ashleigh Moolman	CCC - Liv	Liezel Jordaan	
Taiwan	Ting Ying Huang		Ting Ying Huang	
Tunisia			Tasnime Gharbi	
United Kingdom	Alice Barnes	Canyon//SRAM	Alice Barnes	Canyon//SRAM
Ukraine	Olga Shekel	Astana	Valeriya Ononenko	Lviv Cycling Team
United States	Ruth Winder	Trek–Segafredo	Amber Neben	Cogeas–Mettler–Look
US Virgin Islands	Olympia Maduro		Olympia Maduro	
Venezuela	Wilmarys Moreno		Wilmarys Moreno	

==== Champions in UCI Women's teams ====
Team	Road Race Champions	Time Trial Champions
Alé–Cipollini	Eri Yonamine (JPN)	Eri Yonamine (JPN); Jelena Erić (SER)
Aromitalia–Basso Bikes–Vaiano		
Astana	Blanca Liliana Moreno (COL); Arlenis Sierra (CUB); Svetlana Pachshenko (KAZ); Olga Shekel (UKR)	Arlenis Sierra (CUB); Makhabbat Umutzhanova (KAZ)
Bepink		
Biehler Pro Cycling		
Bigla Pro Cycling		
Bizkaia–Durango		
Boels–Dolmans	Karol-Ann Canuel (CAN); Amalie Dideriksen (DEN); Christine Majerus (LUX)	Christine Majerus (LUX)
BTC City Ljubljana		Mia Radotić (CRO); Eugenia Bujak (SLO)
Canyon//SRAM	Omer Shapira (ISR); Alice Barnes (GBR)	Lisa Klein (GER); Alice Barnes (GBR); Rotem Gafinovitz (ISR)
CCC - Liv	Ashleigh Moolman (RSA)	
Charente-Maritime Women Cycling		
China Liv Pro Cycling		
Cogeas–Mettler–Look	Antri Christoforou (CYP)	Antri Christoforou (CYP); Amber Neben (USA)
Conceria Zabri–Fanini		
Doltcini–Van Eyck Sport	Jesse Vandenbulcke (BEL); Daniela Reis (POR)	Séverine Eraud (FRA); Daniela Reis (POR)
Eneicat	Lija Laizāne (LAT)	
Eurotarget–Bianchi–Vittoria	Ana Covrig (ROM)	Ana Covrig (ROM)
FDJ Nouvelle-Aquitaine Futuroscope	Jade Wiel (FRA)	
Hagens Berman–Supermint		
Health Mate–Cyclelive Team	Zsófia Szabó (HUN)	Veronika Anna Kormos (HUN)
Hitec Products–Birk Sport	Ingrid Lorvik (NOR)	Vita Heine (NOR)
Lotto–Soudal Ladies		Lotte Kopecky (BEL)
Lviv Cycling Team		Valeriya Kononenko (UKR)
Massi–Tactic		
Minsk Cycling Club	Tatsiana Sharakova (BLR)	Tatsiana Sharakova (BLR)
Mitchelton–Scott		Grace Brown (AUS); Annemiek van Vleuten (NED); Georgia Williams (NZL)
Movistar Team	Lourdes Oyarbide (ESP)	Sheyla Gutiérrez (ESP)
Parkhotel Valkenburg	Lorena Wiebes (NED)	
Rally UHC Cycling		
Servetto–Piumate–Beltrami TSA	Alexandra Goncharova (RUS)	
Sopela Women's Team		
Swapit–Agolíco	Anet Barrera (MEX)	
Team Dukla Praha		
Team Illuminate		
Team Sunweb		Leah Kirchmann (CAN)
Team Waoo		Louise Norman Hansen (DEN)
Thailand Women's Cycling Team		
Tibco–Silicon Valley Bank		
Top Girls Fassa Bortolo	Maja Perinović (CRO)	
Trek–Segafredo	Ruth Winder (USA)	Anna Plichta (POL)
Sho-Air Twenty20		
Valcar–Cylance		
WNT–Rotor Pro Cycling	Lisa Brennauer (GER)	
