= 2016 Volta a Portugal =

2016 UCI Europe Tour

Race details
- Dates: July 27 - August 7
- Stages: 10 + Prologue
- Distance: 1,618.7 km (1,005.8 mi)
- Winning time: 40h 57' 56"

Results
Jersey awarded to the overall winner	Winner	Rui Vinhas (POR)	(W52 / FC Porto / Porto Canal)
	Second	Gustavo Veloso (ESP)	(W52 / FC Porto / Porto Canal)
	Third	Daniel Silva (POR)	(Rádio Popular–Boavista)
Jersey awarded to the points classification winner	Points	Gustavo Veloso (ESP)	(W52 / FC Porto / Porto Canal)
Jersey awarded to the mountains classification winner	Mountains	Wilson Díaz (COL)	(Funvic Soul Cycles–Carrefour)
Jersey awarded to the young rider classification winner	Young rider	Alexander Vdovin (RUS)	(Lokosphinx)
	Team	(Portugal) W52 / FC Porto / Porto Canal	

The 2016 Volta a Portugal is a men's road bicycle race held from 27 July to 7 August 2016. It is the 78th edition of the men's stage race to be held, which was established in 1927. As part of the 2016 UCI Europe Tour, it is rated as a 2.1 event.

== Participating teams ==
In total, 18 teams are set to compete.

- National teams:
  - W52 / FC Porto / Porto Canal
  - Efapel
  - Rádio Popular–Boavista
  - LA Alumínios–Antarte
  - Sporting / Tavira
  - Louletano–Hospital de Loulé
- International teams:
  - Caja Rural–Seguros RGA
  - Drapac Professional Cycling
  - Androni Giocattoli–Sidermec
  - Funvic Soul Cycles–Carrefour
  - Team Roth
  - Lokosphinx
  - Christina Jewelry Pro Cycling
  - Euskadi Basque Country–Murias
  - Boyacá Raza de Campeones
  - Inteja–MMR Dominican Cycling Team
  - Astana City
  - Armée de Terre

== Schedule ==
Stage	Route	Distance	Date	Type		Winner
P	Oliveira de Azeméis > Oliveira de Azeméis	3.6 km (2 mi)	July 27		Individual time trial	Rafael Reis (POR)
1	Ovar (Furadouro) > Braga	167.4 km (104 mi)	July 28		Medium-mountain stage	Daniel Mestre (POR)
2	Viana do Castelo > Fafe	160 km (99 mi)	July 29		Medium-mountain stage	Francesco Gavazzi (ITA)
3	Montalegre > Macedo de Cavaleiros	158.9 km (99 mi)	July 30		Medium-mountain stage	Will Clarke (AUS)
4	Bragança > Mondim de Basto (Srª da Graça)	191.9 km (119 mi)	July 31		Mountain stage	Gustavo Veloso (ESP)
5	Lamego > Viseu	153.2 km (95 mi)	August 1		Mountain stage	Vicente García de Mateos (ESP)
6	Belmonte > Guarda	173.7 km (108 mi)	August 3		Mountain stage	Gustavo Veloso (ESP)
7	Figueira de Castelo Rodrigo > Castelo Branco	182 km (113 mi)	August 4		Plain stage	José Gonçalves (POR)
8	Nazaré > Arruda dos Vinhos	208.5 km (130 mi)	August 5		Medium-mountain stage	Jesús Ezquerra (ESP)
9	Alcácer do Sal > Setúbal	187.5 km (117 mi)	August 6	Flat stage	Medium-mountain stage	Daniel Mestre (POR)
10	Vila Franca de Xira > Lisbon	32 km (20 mi)	August 7		Individual time trial	Gustavo Veloso (ESP)

== Classification leadership ==
Stage	Winner	General classification Classificação Geral Individual	Points classification Classificação dos Pontos	Mountains classification Classificação da Montanha	Young rider classification Classificação da Juventude	Team classification Classificação por Equipas
P	Rafael Reis	Rafael Reis	not awarded	not awarded	Oscar Rodríguez	Efapel
1	Daniel Mestre	Daniel Mestre	Daniel Mestre	Frederico Figueiredo	Diego Ochoa	Efapel
2	Francesco Gavazzi	Daniel Mestre	Daniel Mestre	Wilson Díaz	Diego Ochoa	Efapel
3	Will Clarke	Rui Vinhas	Will Clarke	César Fonte	Diego Ochoa	Androni Giocattoli–Sidermec
4	Gustavo Veloso	Rui Vinhas	Gustavo Veloso	César Fonte	Vitor Etxebarria	W52 / FC Porto / Porto Canal
5	Vicente García de Mateos	Rui Vinhas	Gustavo Veloso	Wilson Díaz	Vitor Etxebarria	W52 / FC Porto / Porto Canal
6	Gustavo Veloso	Rui Vinhas	Gustavo Veloso	Wilson Díaz	Alexander Vdovin	W52 / FC Porto / Porto Canal
7	José Gónçalves	Rui Vinhas	Gustavo Veloso	Wilson Díaz	Alexander Vdovin	W52 / FC Porto / Porto Canal
8	Jesús Ezquerra	Rui Vinhas	Gustavo Veloso	Wilson Díaz	Alexander Vdovin	W52 / FC Porto / Porto Canal
9	Daniel Mestre	Rui Vinhas	Gustavo Veloso	Wilson Díaz	Alexander Vdovin	W52 / FC Porto / Porto Canal
10	Gustavo Veloso	Rui Vinhas	Gustavo Veloso	Wilson Díaz	Alexander Vdovin	W52 / FC Porto / Porto Canal
Final Classification		Rui Vinhas	Gustavo Veloso	Wilson Díaz	Alexander Vdovin	W52 / FC Porto / Porto Canal

== Classification standings ==
=== Prologue ===
27 July 2016 — Oliveira de Azeméis, 3.2 km individual time trial (ITT)

Prologue result and general classification

Rank	Rider	Team	Time
1	Rafael Reis (POR)	W52 / FC Porto / Porto Canal	4' 42"
2	Joni Brandão (POR)	Efapel	+ 3"
3	José Gonçalves (POR)	Caja Rural–Seguros RGA	+ 4"
4	Daniel Mestre (POR)	Efapel	+ 4"
5	Will Clarke (AUS)	Drapac Professional Cycling	+ 5"
6	Vicente García de Mateos (ESP)	Louletano–Hospital de Loulé	+ 5"
7	Filipe Cardoso (POR)	Efapel	+ 6"
8	Tom Scully (NZL)	Drapac Professional Cycling	+ 6"
9	Rinaldo Nocentini (ITA)	Sporting / Tavira	+ 7"
10	João Gaspar (BRA)	Funvic Soul Cycles–Carrefour	+ 7"

=== Stage 1 ===
28 July 2016 — Ovar (Furadouro) to Braga, 167.4 km

Stage 1 result

Rank	Rider	Team	Time
1	Daniel Mestre (POR)	Efapel	4h 21' 27"
2	Davide Viganò (ITA)	Androni Giocattoli–Sidermec	s.t.
3	José Gonçalves (POR)	Caja Rural–Seguros RGA	s.t.
4	Samuel Caldeira (POR)	W52 / FC Porto / Porto Canal	s.t.
5	Gustavo Veloso (ESP)	W52 / FC Porto / Porto Canal	s.t.
6	Adam Phelan (AUS)	Drapac Professional Cycling	s.t.
7	Luís Mendonça (POR)	Funvic Soul Cycles–Carrefour	s.t.
8	Vicente García de Mateos (ESP)	Louletano–Hospital de Loulé	s.t.
9	Jesús Ezquerra (ESP)	Sporting / Tavira	s.t.
10	David de la Fuente (ESP)	Sporting / Tavira	s.t.

General classification after Stage 1

Rank	Rider	Team	Time
1	Daniel Mestre (POR)	Efapel	4h 26' 03"
2	José Gonçalves (POR)	Caja Rural–Seguros RGA	+ 6"
3	Joni Brandão (POR)	Efapel	+ 9"
4	Vicente García de Mateos (ESP)	Louletano–Hospital de Loulé	+ 11"
5	Filipe Cardoso (POR)	Efapel	+ 12"
6	Rinaldo Nocentini (ITA)	Sporting / Tavira	+ 13"
7	João Gaspar (BRA)	Funvic Soul Cycles–Carrefour	+ 13"
8	Stefan Schumacher (GER)	Christina Jewelry Pro Cycling	+ 14"
9	Jesús Ezquerra (ESP)	Sporting / Tavira	+ 15"
10	Francesco Gavazzi (ITA)	Androni Giocattoli–Sidermec	+ 16"

=== Stage 2 ===
19 July 2016 — Viana do Castelo to Fafe, 160 km

Stage 2 result

Rank	Rider	Team	Time
1	Francesco Gavazzi (ITA)	Androni Giocattoli–Sidermec	4h 12' 43"
2	José Gonçalves (POR)	Caja Rural–Seguros RGA	s.t.
3	Vicente García de Mateos (ESP)	Louletano–Hospital de Loulé	s.t.
4	Davide Viganò (ITA)	Androni Giocattoli–Sidermec	s.t.
5	Gustavo Veloso (ESP)	W52 / FC Porto / Porto Canal	s.t.
6	Daniel Mestre (POR)	Efapel	s.t.
7	Rinaldo Nocentini (ITA)	Sporting / Tavira	s.t.
8	Jesús Ezquerra (ESP)	Sporting / Tavira	s.t.
9	Ricardo Vilela (POR)	Caja Rural–Seguros RGA	s.t.
10	Daniel Silva (POR)	Rádio Popular–Boavista	s.t.

General classification after Stage 2

Rank	Rider	Team	Time
1	Daniel Mestre (POR)	Efapel	8h 38' 43"
2	José Gonçalves (POR)	Caja Rural–Seguros RGA	+ 3"
3	Francesco Gavazzi (ITA)	Androni Giocattoli–Sidermec	+ 9"
4	Vicente García de Mateos (ESP)	Louletano–Hospital de Loulé	+ 10"
5	Joni Brandão (POR)	Efapel	+ 12"
6	Rinaldo Nocentini (ITA)	Sporting / Tavira	+ 16"
7	João Gaspar (BRA)	Funvic Soul Cycles–Carrefour	+ 16"
8	Stefan Schumacher (GER)	Christina Jewelry Pro Cycling	+ 17"
9	Gustavo Veloso (ESP)	W52 / FC Porto / Porto Canal	+ 18"
10	Jesús Ezquerra (ESP)	Sporting / Tavira	+ 18"

=== Stage 3 ===
30 July 2016 — Montalegre to Macedo de Cavaleiros, 158.9 km

Stage 3 result

Rank	Rider	Team	Time
1	Will Clarke (AUS)	Drapac Professional Cycling	3h 49' 50"
2	Marco Frapporti (ITA)	Androni Giocattoli–Sidermec	+ 2"
3	Benjamin Thomas (FRA)	Armée de Terre	+ 54"
4	Alex Diniz (BRA)	Funvic Soul Cycles–Carrefour	+ 54"
5	Micael Isidoro (POR)	Louletano–Hospital de Loulé	+ 54"
6	Jon Insausti (ESP)	Euskadi Basque Country–Murias	+ 54"
7	Carlos Parra (COL)	Boyacá Raza de Campeones	+ 54"
8	Rui Vinhas (POR)	W52 / FC Porto / Porto Canal	+ 54"
9	Vicente García de Mateos (ESP)	Louletano–Hospital de Loulé	+ 4' 45"
10	Andrea Pasqualon (ITA)	Team Roth	+ 4' 45"

General classification after Stage 3

Rank	Rider	Team	Time
1	Rui Vinhas (POR)	W52 / FC Porto / Porto Canal	12h 29' 59"
2	Daniel Mestre (POR)	Efapel	+ 3' 19"
3	José Gonçalves (POR)	Caja Rural–Seguros RGA	+ 3' 21"
4	Francesco Gavazzi (ITA)	Androni Giocattoli–Sidermec	+ 3' 25"
5	Vicente García de Mateos (ESP)	Louletano–Hospital de Loulé	+ 3' 29"
6	Joni Brandão (POR)	Efapel	+ 3' 31"
7	João Gaspar (BRA)	Funvic Soul Cycles–Carrefour	+ 3' 34"
8	Rinaldo Nocentini (ITA)	Sporting / Tavira	+ 3' 35"
9	Gustavo Veloso (ESP)	W52 / FC Porto / Porto Canal	+ 3' 35"
10	Stefan Schumacher (GER)	Christina Jewelry Pro Cycling	+ 3' 36"

=== Stage 4 ===
31 July 2016 — Bragança to Mondim de Basto (Srª da Graça), 191.9 km

Stage 4 result

Rank	Rider	Team	Time
1	Gustavo Veloso (ESP)	W52 / FC Porto / Porto Canal	5h 12' 24"
2	Daniel Silva (POR)	Rádio Popular–Boavista	+ 5"
3	Joni Brandão (POR)	Efapel	+ 12"
4	~~Raúl Alarcón (ESP)~~	W52 / FC Porto / Porto Canal	+ 34"
5	Rui Vinhas (POR)	W52 / FC Porto / Porto Canal	+ 35"
6	Henrique Casimiro (POR)	Efapel	+ 35"
7	Amaro Antunes (POR)	LA Alumínios–Antarte	+ 35"
8	João Benta (POR)	Louletano–Hospital de Loulé	+ 37"
9	António Carvalho (POR)	W52 / FC Porto / Porto Canal	+ 46"
10	Vicente García de Mateos (ESP)	Louletano–Hospital de Loulé	+ 1' 02"

General classification after Stage 4

Rank	Rider	Team	Time
1	Rui Vinhas (POR)	W52 / FC Porto / Porto Canal	17h 42' 58"
2	Gustavo Veloso (ESP)	W52 / FC Porto / Porto Canal	+ 2' 48"
3	Joni Brandão (POR)	Efapel	+ 3' 04"
4	Daniel Silva (POR)	Rádio Popular–Boavista	+ 3' 05"
5	João Benta (POR)	Louletano–Hospital de Loulé	+ 3' 43"
6	~~Raúl Alarcón (ESP)~~	W52 / FC Porto / Porto Canal	+ 3' 45"
7	Amaro Antunes (POR)	LA Alumínios–Antarte	+ 3' 46"
8	Henrique Casimiro (POR)	Efapel	+ 3' 49"
9	Vicente García de Mateos (ESP)	Louletano–Hospital de Loulé	+ 3' 56"
10	António Carvalho (POR)	W52 / FC Porto / Porto Canal	+ 3' 57"

=== Stage 5 ===
1 August 2016 — Lamego to Viseu, 153.2 km

Stage 5 result

Rank	Rider	Team	Time
1	Vicente García de Mateos (ESP)	Louletano–Hospital de Loulé	3h 57' 58"
2	Rinaldo Nocentini (ITA)	Sporting / Tavira	s.t.
3	Francesco Gavazzi (ITA)	Androni Giocattoli–Sidermec	s.t.
4	Daniel Mestre (POR)	Efapel	s.t.
5	Joni Brandão (POR)	Efapel	s.t.
6	Alexander Vdovin (RUS)	Lokosphinx	s.t.
7	Nathan Earle (AUS)	Drapac Professional Cycling	s.t.
8	Amaro Antunes (POR)	LA Alumínios–Antarte	s.t.
9	Alejandro Marque (ESP)	LA Alumínios–Antarte	s.t.
10	Gustavo Veloso (ESP)	W52 / FC Porto / Porto Canal	s.t.

General classification after Stage 5

Rank	Rider	Team	Time
1	Rui Vinhas (POR)	W52 / FC Porto / Porto Canal	21h 40' 56"
2	Gustavo Veloso (ESP)	W52 / FC Porto / Porto Canal	+ 2' 45"
3	Joni Brandão (POR)	Efapel	+ 3' 02"
4	Daniel Silva (POR)	Rádio Popular–Boavista	+ 3' 04"
5	João Benta (POR)	Louletano–Hospital de Loulé	+ 3' 43"
6	Amaro Antunes (POR)	LA Alumínios–Antarte	+ 3' 44"
7	~~Raúl Alarcón (ESP)~~	W52 / FC Porto / Porto Canal	+ 3' 45"
8	Vicente García de Mateos (ESP)	Louletano–Hospital de Loulé	+ 3' 46"
9	Henrique Casimiro (POR)	Efapel	+ 3' 49"
10	António Carvalho (POR)	W52 / FC Porto / Porto Canal	+ 4' 01"

=== Stage 6 ===
3 August 2016 — Belmonte to Guarda, 173.7 km

Stage 6 result

Rank	Rider	Team	Time
1	Gustavo Veloso (ESP)	W52 / FC Porto / Porto Canal	4h 55' 49"
2	Daniel Silva (POR)	Rádio Popular–Boavista	+ 5"
3	~~Raúl Alarcón (ESP)~~	W52 / FC Porto / Porto Canal	+ 7"
4	Vicente García de Mateos (ESP)	Louletano–Hospital de Loulé	+ 10"
5	Rui Vinhas (POR)	W52 / FC Porto / Porto Canal	+ 10"
6	Amaro Antunes (POR)	LA Alumínios–Antarte	+ 21"
7	Joni Brandão (POR)	Efapel	+ 21"
8	Henrique Casimiro (POR)	Efapel	+ 26"
9	Rui Sousa (POR)	Rádio Popular–Boavista	+ 32"
10	Frederico Figueiredo (POR)	Rádio Popular–Boavista	+ 48"

General classification after Stage 6

Rank	Rider	Team	Time
1	Rui Vinhas (POR)	W52 / FC Porto / Porto Canal	26h 36' 55"
2	Gustavo Veloso (ESP)	W52 / FC Porto / Porto Canal	+ 2' 25"
3	Daniel Silva (POR)	Rádio Popular–Boavista	+ 2' 53"
4	Joni Brandão (POR)	Efapel	+ 3' 13"
5	~~Raúl Alarcón (ESP)~~	W52 / FC Porto / Porto Canal	+ 3' 38"
6	Vicente García de Mateos (ESP)	Louletano–Hospital de Loulé	+ 3' 46"
7	Amaro Antunes (POR)	LA Alumínios–Antarte	+ 3' 55"
8	Henrique Casimiro (POR)	Efapel	+ 4' 05"
9	Frederico Figueiredo (POR)	Rádio Popular–Boavista	+ 4' 56"
10	Rui Sousa (POR)	Rádio Popular–Boavista	+ 5' 35"

=== Stage 7 ===
4 August 2016 — Figueira de Castelo Rodrigo to Castelo Branco, 182 km

Stage 7 result

Rank	Rider	Team	Time
1	José Gonçalves (POR)	Caja Rural–Seguros RGA	4h 19' 38"
2	Samuel Caldeira (POR)	W52 / FC Porto / Porto Canal	s.t.
3	Francesco Gavazzi (ITA)	Androni Giocattoli–Sidermec	s.t.
4	Gustavo Veloso (ESP)	W52 / FC Porto / Porto Canal	s.t.
5	Daniel Mestre (POR)	Efapel	s.t.
6	Matvey Nikitin (KAZ)	Astana City	s.t.
7	Stephane Poulhies (FRA)	Armée de Terre	s.t.
8	Rinaldo Nocentini (ITA)	Sporting / Tavira	s.t.
9	Luís Mendonça (POR)	Funvic Soul Cycles–Carrefour	s.t.
10	Daniel Silva (POR)	Rádio Popular–Boavista	s.t.

General classification after Stage 7

Rank	Rider	Team	Time
1	Rui Vinhas (POR)	W52 / FC Porto / Porto Canal	30h 56' 33"
2	Gustavo Veloso (ESP)	W52 / FC Porto / Porto Canal	+ 2' 25"
3	Daniel Silva (POR)	Rádio Popular–Boavista	+ 2' 53"
4	Joni Brandão (POR)	Efapel	+ 3' 11"
5	~~Raúl Alarcón (ESP)~~	W52 / FC Porto / Porto Canal	+ 3' 37"
6	Vicente García de Mateos (ESP)	Louletano–Hospital de Loulé	+ 3' 43"
7	Amaro Antunes (POR)	LA Alumínios–Antarte	+ 3' 55"
8	Henrique Casimiro (POR)	Efapel	+ 4' 17"
9	Frederico Figueiredo (POR)	Rádio Popular–Boavista	+ 4' 56"
10	Rui Sousa (POR)	Rádio Popular–Boavista	+ 5' 35"

=== Stage 8 ===
5 August 2016 — Nazaré to Arruda dos Vinhos, 208.5 km

Stage 8 result

Rank	Rider	Team	Time
1	Jesús Ezquerra (ESP)	Sporting / Tavira	5h 02' 04"
2	Samuel Caldeira (POR)	W52 / FC Porto / Porto Canal	+ 15"
3	Nathan Earle (AUS)	Drapac Professional Cycling	+ 17"
4	David Belda (ESP)	Team Roth	+ 19"
5	Ricardo Vilela (POR)	Caja Rural–Seguros RGA	+ 21"
6	Davide Viganò (ITA)	Androni Giocattoli–Sidermec	+ 21"
7	Gustavo Veloso (ESP)	W52 / FC Porto / Porto Canal	+ 4' 44"
8	~~Raúl Alarcón (ESP)~~	W52 / FC Porto / Porto Canal	+ 4' 44"
9	Franco Pellizotti (ITA)	Androni Giocattoli–Sidermec	+ 4' 44"
10	Joni Brandão (POR)	Efapel	+ 4' 44"

General classification after Stage 8

Rank	Rider	Team	Time
1	Rui Vinhas (POR)	W52 / FC Porto / Porto Canal	36h 03' 21"
2	Gustavo Veloso (ESP)	W52 / FC Porto / Porto Canal	+ 2' 25"
3	Daniel Silva (POR)	Rádio Popular–Boavista	+ 2' 53"
4	Joni Brandão (POR)	Efapel	+ 3' 11"
5	~~Raúl Alarcón (ESP)~~	W52 / FC Porto / Porto Canal	+ 3' 37"
6	Vicente García de Mateos (ESP)	Louletano–Hospital de Loulé	+ 3' 43"
7	Amaro Antunes (POR)	LA Alumínios–Antarte	+ 3' 55"
8	Henrique Casimiro (POR)	Efapel	+ 4' 17"
9	Frederico Figueiredo (POR)	Rádio Popular–Boavista	+ 4' 56"
10	Rui Sousa (POR)	Rádio Popular–Boavista	+ 5' 35"

=== Stage 9 ===
6 August 2016 — Alcácer do Sal to Setúbal, 187.5 km

Stage 9 result

Rank	Rider	Team	Time
1	Daniel Mestre (POR)	Efapel	4h 12' 50"
2	Alejandro Marque (ESP)	LA Alumínios–Antarte	s.t.
3	Alessio Taliani (ITA)	Androni Giocattoli–Sidermec	+ 3"
4	Davide Viganò (ITA)	Androni Giocattoli–Sidermec	+ 5"
5	Adam Phelan (AUS)	Drapac Professional Cycling	+ 5"
6	Eduard Prades (ESP)	Caja Rural–Seguros RGA	+ 5"
7	Vicente García de Mateos (ESP)	Louletano–Hospital de Loulé	+ 5"
8	Francesco Gavazzi (ITA)	Androni Giocattoli–Sidermec	+ 5"
9	Luís Mendonça (POR)	Funvic Soul Cycles–Carrefour	+ 5"
10	Rinaldo Nocentini (ITA)	Sporting / Tavira	+ 5"

General classification after Stage 9

Rank	Rider	Team	Time
1	Rui Vinhas (POR)	W52 / FC Porto / Porto Canal	40h 16' 16"
2	Gustavo Veloso (ESP)	W52 / FC Porto / Porto Canal	+ 2' 25"
3	Daniel Silva (POR)	Rádio Popular–Boavista	+ 2' 53"
4	Joni Brandão (POR)	Efapel	+ 3' 11"
5	~~Raúl Alarcón (ESP)~~	W52 / FC Porto / Porto Canal	+ 3' 37"
6	Vicente García de Mateos (ESP)	Louletano–Hospital de Loulé	+ 3' 43"
7	Amaro Antunes (POR)	LA Alumínios–Antarte	+ 3' 55"
8	Henrique Casimiro (POR)	Efapel	+ 4' 17"
9	Frederico Figueiredo (POR)	Rádio Popular–Boavista	+ 4' 56"
10	Rui Sousa (POR)	Rádio Popular–Boavista	+ 5' 35"

=== Stage 10 ===
7 August 2016 — ITT Vila Franca de Xira to Lisbon, 32 km

Stage 10 result

Rank	Rider	Team	Time
1	Gustavo Veloso (ESP)	W52 / FC Porto / Porto Canal	40' 46"
2	~~Raúl Alarcón (ESP)~~	W52 / FC Porto / Porto Canal	+ 47"
3	Daniel Silva (POR)	Rádio Popular–Boavista	+ 50"
4	Rui Vinhas (POR)	W52 / FC Porto / Porto Canal	+ 54"
5	Ricardo Mestre (POR)	W52 / FC Porto / Porto Canal	+ 1' 29"
6	Joni Brandão (POR)	Efapel	+ 1' 37"
7	Stefan Schumacher (GER)	Christina Jewelry Pro Cycling	+ 1' 39"
8	Ricardo Vilela (POR)	Caja Rural–Seguros RGA	+ 2' 02"
9	Rui Sousa (POR)	Rádio Popular–Boavista	+ 2' 03"
10	Amaro Antunes (POR)	LA Alumínios–Antarte	+ 2' 07"

Final General classification

Rank	Rider	Team	Time
1	Rui Vinhas (POR)	W52 / FC Porto / Porto Canal	40h 57' 56"
2	Gustavo Veloso (ESP)	W52 / FC Porto / Porto Canal	+ 1' 31"
3	Daniel Silva (POR)	Rádio Popular–Boavista	+ 2' 49"
4	~~Raúl Alarcón (ESP)~~	W52 / FC Porto / Porto Canal	+ 3' 30"
5	Joni Brandão (POR)	Efapel	+ 3' 54"
6	Amaro Antunes (POR)	LA Alumínios–Antarte	+ 5' 08"
7	Henrique Casimiro (POR)	Efapel	+ 6' 03"
8	Vicente García de Mateos (ESP)	Louletano–Hospital de Loulé	+ 6' 30"
9	Rui Sousa (POR)	Rádio Popular–Boavista	+ 6' 44"
10	Ricardo Vilela (POR)	Caja Rural–Seguros RGA	+ 7' 21"

== Final standings ==
General classification
Pos	Rider	Team	Time
1	Rui Vinhas (POR)	W52 / FC Porto / Porto Canal	40h 57' 56"
2	Gustavo Veloso (ESP)	W52 / FC Porto / Porto Canal	+ 1' 31"
3	Daniel Silva (POR)	Rádio Popular–Boavista	+ 2' 49"
4	~~Raúl Alarcón (ESP)~~	W52 / FC Porto / Porto Canal	+ 3' 30"
5	Joni Brandão (POR)	Efapel	+ 3' 54"
6	Amaro Antunes (POR)	LA Alumínios–Antarte	+ 5' 08"
7	Henrique Casimiro (POR)	Efapel	+ 6' 03"
8	Vicente García de Mateos (ESP)	Louletano–Hospital de Loulé	+ 6' 30"
9	Rui Sousa (POR)	Rádio Popular–Boavista	+ 6' 44"
10	Ricardo Vilela (POR)	Caja Rural–Seguros RGA	+ 7' 21"

Points classification
Pos	Rider	Team	Points
1	Gustavo Veloso (ESP)	W52–FC Porto–Porto Canal	124
2	Daniel Mestre (POR)	Efapel	89
3	Francesco Gavazzi (ITA)	Androni Giocattoli–Sidermec	70

Mountains classification
Pos	Rider	Team	Points
1	Wilson Díaz (COL)	Funvic Soul Cycles–Carrefour	70
2	Joni Brandão (POR)	Efapel	57
3	Bruno Silva (POR)	LA Alumínios–Antarte	55

Youth classification
Pos	Rider	Team	Time
1	Alexander Vdovin (RUS)	Lokosphinx	41h 39' 15"
2	Diego Ochoa (COL)	Boyacá Raza de Campeones	+ 17' 34"
3	Vitor Etxebarria (ESP)	Rádio Popular–Boavista	+ 18' 55"

Teams classification
Pos	Team	Time
1	W52 / FC Porto / Porto Canal	122h 54' 24"
2	Rádio Popular–Boavista	+ 16' 46"
3	Efapel	+ 33' 33"
