= Joaquim Andrade =

Portuguese cyclist

Personal information
- Full name: Joaquim Adrego Pereira Andrade
- Born: 16 August 1969 (age 57) Travanca, Portugal

Cycling career
- Sport: Cycling
- Current team: Retired
- Discipline: Road
- Role: Rider

Professional teams
- 1989–1992: Sicasal–Toreensse
- 1993: Imporbor–Feirense
- 1994: Recer–Boavista
- 1995–1999: Maia–Jumbo
- 2000: Barbot–Torrie
- 2001–2002: Cantanhede–Marques de Marialva
- 2003–2004: Porta da Ravessa–Tavira
- 2005–2006: Riberalves–GoldNutrition
- 2007–2009: Fercase–Rota dos Móveis

Joaquim Adrego Pereira Andrade (born 16 August 1969 in Travanca) is a Portuguese former professional cyclist.

== Major results ==
1989
1st Stage 3a Troféu Joaquim Agostinho
1st Stage 4 (ITT) Volta a Portugal
1991
1st Overall Volta ao Algarve
1993
3rd Overall Volta ao Alentejo
1995
1st Stage 6 Volta a Portugal
3rd Overall Volta ao Alentejo

1st Stage 4

3rd Overall Volta ao Algarve
1997
1st Overall Tour du Poitou-Charentes

1st Stage 4a

1998
3rd Time trial, National Road Championships
1999
2nd Time trial, National Road Championships
2000
2nd Time trial, National Road Championships
2002
1st Time trial, National Road Championships
1st Overall Volta ao Alentejo
2003
1st Time trial, National Road Championships
2004
1st Stage 4 Volta ao Distrito de Santarém
2nd Overall Volta ao Alentejo
2005
1st Road race, National Road Championships
2006
3rd Time trial, National Road Championships
