= Bruno Castanheira =

Bruno Castanheira may refer to:

- Bruno Suzuki, Brazilian footballer also known as Bruno Castanheira
- Bruno Castanheira (cyclist), Portuguese cyclist
