= List of 2006 UCI Professional Continental and Continental teams =

Listed below are the UCI professional continental and continental teams that compete in road bicycle racing events of the UCI Continental Circuits organised by the International Cycling Union (UCI). The UCI Continental Circuits are divided into five continental zones, America, Europe, Asia, Africa and Oceania.

== UCI professional continental teams ==
According to the UCI Rulebook, "a professional continental team is an organisation created to take part in road events open to professional continental teams. It is known by a unique name and registered with the UCI in accordance with the provisions below.

- The professional continental team comprises all the riders registered with the UCI as members of the team, the paying agent, the sponsors and all other persons contracted by the paying agent and/or the sponsors to provide for the continuing operation of the team (manager, team manager, coach, paramedical assistant, mechanic, etc.).
- Each professional continental team must employ at least 14 riders, 2 team managers and 3 other staff (paramedical assistants, mechanics, etc.) on a full time basis for the whole registration year."

=== List of 2006 UCI Africa Tour teams ===
Code	Official team name	Country	Website
	No team registered		

=== List of 2006 UCI America Tour teams ===
Code	Official team name	Country
CLM	Selle Italia–Serramenti Diquigiovanni	Colombia
NIC	Navigators Insurance Cycling Team	United States
HNM	Health Net Pro Cycling Team Presented by Maxxis	United States

=== List of 2006 UCI Asia Tour teams ===
Code	Official team name	Country
	No team registered	

=== List of 2006 UCI Europe Tour teams ===
Code	Official team name	Country
VGB	Team Vorarlberg	Austria
ELK	Elk Haus–Simplon	Austria
LAN	Landbouwkrediet–Colnago	Belgium
UNI	Unibet.com	Belgium
JAC	Chocolade Jacques–Topsport Vlaanderen	Belgium
APV	Andalucía–Paul Versan	Spain
ECV	Comunitat Valenciana	Spain
KAI	Kaiku	Spain
MOL	3 Molinos Resort	Spain
REG	Relax–GAM	Spain
AGR	Agritubel	France
BAR	Barloworld	United Kingdom
WIE	Team Wiesenhof–AKUD	Germany
PAN	Ceramica Panaria–Navigare	Ireland
TEN	Team Tenax Salmilano	Ireland
MIE	Miche	Italy
NSM	Naturino–Sapore di Mare	Italy
AGC	Team 3C Casalinghi Jet Androni Giocattoli	Italy
FLM	Ceramica Flaminia	Italy
ASA	Acqua & Sapone–Caffè Mokambo	Italy
SKS	Skil–Shimano	Netherlands
INT	Intel–Action	Poland
LPR	Team L.P.R.	Switzerland

=== List of 2006 UCI Oceania Tour teams ===
Code	Official team name	Country
	No team registered	

== UCI continental teams ==
According to the UCI Rulebook, "a UCI continental team is a team of road riders recognised and licensed to take part in events on the continental calendars by the national federation of the nationality of the majority of its riders and registered with the UCI. The precise structure (legal and financial status, registration, guarantees, standard contract, etc.) of these teams shall be determined by the regulations of the national federation."

Riders may be professional or amateur.

=== List of 2006 UCI Africa Tour teams ===
Code	Official team name	Country
KON	Team Konica Minolta	South Africa

=== List of 2006 UCI America Tour teams ===
Code	Official team name	Country
ADL	Calyonn–Litespeed	Canada
SYM	Symmetrics	Canada
ATO	Atom	Colombia
TUA	Tecos de la Universidad Autónoma de Guadalajara	Mexico
CCT	Chivas Cycling Team	Mexico
CAI	Caico Cycling Team	Puerto Rico
OSN	KodakGallery.com–Sierra Nevada Pro Cycling	United States
AEG	AEG Toshiba–JetNetwork Pro Cycling Team	United States
COL	Colavita Olive Oil–Sutter Home Wines Cycling Team	United States
JBC	Jelly Belly Cycling Team	United States
ABB	Priority Health Cycling Team	United States
NER	Nerac/OutdoorLights.com Pro Cycling	United States
VMG	VMG Racing	United States
RAP	Rite Aid Pro Cycling	United States
SLP	SuccessFulliving.com Presented by Parkpre	United States
TIA	Team TIAA–CREF	United States
TMN	Team Monex	United States
TTC	Targetraining Cycling Team	United States
TUT	Toyota–United	United States
JIT	Jittery Joe's–Zero Gravity	United States

=== List of 2006 UCI Asia Tour teams ===
Code	Official team name	Country
MPC	Marco Polo Cycling Team	China
PUR	Purapharm	Hong Kong
WIT	Wismilak International Team	Indonesia
PSN	Pllygon Sweet Nice Team	Indonesia
VAN	Cycle Racing Team Vang	Japan
MYT	Miyata–Subaru	Japan
MTR	Matrix Powertag	Japan
AIS	Aisan Racing Team	Japan
CAP	Cycling Team Capec	Kazakhstan
TPC	Treo Pro Cycling Team	Philippines
GNT	Giant Asia Racing Team	Chinese Taipei

=== List of 2006 UCI Europe Tour teams ===
Code	Official team name	Country
SWI	Team Swiag Teka	Austria
RAD	RC Arbo Resch & Frisch Wels	Austria
APO	ApoSport Krone Linz	Austria
PRA	Team Plast–Recycling–Austria	Austria
PZC	Profel Ziegler Continental Team	Belgium
PCW	Pole Continental Wallon Bergasol–Euro Millions	Belgium
PCO	Palmans–Collstrop	Belgium
PBH	Pictoflex–Bikeland–Hyundai	Belgium
BLV	Bodysol–Win for Life–Jong Vlaanderen	Belgium
ABM	Yawadoo–Colba–ABM	Belgium
JAR	Jartazi–7Mobile	Belgium
FLA	Flanders	Belgium
UBD	Unibet–Davo	Belgium
FID	Fidea Cycling Team	Belgium
TZS	Tzar Simeon–MBN	Bulgaria
CCB	Cycling Club Burgas	Bulgaria
HEM	Hemus 1896–Berneschi	Bulgaria
ADP	ASC Dukla Praha	Czech Republic
PSK	PSK Whirlpool–Hradec Králové	Czech Republic
TDL	Team Dukla Liberec	Czech Republic
ASP	AC Sparta Prague	Czech Republic
TPH	Team GLS	Denmark
DES	Team Designa Kokken	Denmark
GLU	Glud & Marstrand–Horsens	Denmark
VBT	Team Vision Bikes	Denmark
SPI	Spiuk–Extremadura	Spain
MAS	Massi	Spain
GNM	Grupo Nicolas Mateos	Spain
VMC	Viña Magna–Cropu	Spain
ORB	Orbea	Spain
KCT	Kalev Chocolate Team	Estonia
BJF	Groupe Sportif Bretagne–Jean Floch	France
AUB	Auber 93	France
DFL	DFL–Cyclingnews–Litespeed	United Kingdom
PVC	Agisko–Viner–Cycling.tv	United Kingdom
RCY	Recycling.co.uk	United Kingdom
TRS	Team Regionstrom–Senges	Germany
CTM	Continental Team Milram	Germany
TET	Thuringer Energie Team	Germany
STV	Stevens Racing Team	Germany
TNB	Team Notebooksbilliger.de	Germany
TLM	Team Lamonta	Germany
HVH	Heinz Von Heiden Team Hanover	Germany
TSP	Team Sparkasse	Germany
PNB	P-Nivó Betonexpressz 2000 KFT.se	Hungary
TMG	Team Murphy & Gunn / Newlyn	Ireland
SKT	Sean Kelly Team ACLVB–M.Donnelly Team	Ireland
TUC	CB Immobiliare–Universal Caffe	Italy
ODL	OTC Doors–Lauretana	Italy
RBR	Rietumu Banka–Riga	Latvia
CCD	Continental Cycling Team Differdange	Luxembourg
UBB	Ubbink–Syntec Cycling Team	Netherlands
KST	KrolStonE Continental Team	Netherlands
BEC	B&E Cycling Team	Netherlands
CJP	Cyclingteam Jo Piels	Netherlands
VVE	Van Vijet–EBH–Advocaten	Netherlands
PCH	Procomm–Van Hemert	Netherlands
RBJ	Rabobank	Netherlands
FPT	Fondas P3Transfer Team	Netherlands
LOW	Team Löwik Meubelen	Netherlands
TMB	Team Maxbo Bianchi	Norway
SPA	Team Sparebanken Vest	Norway
DHL	DHL–Author	Poland
AMO	Amore & Vita–McDonald's	Poland
NBL	Nobless	Poland
SPL	CCC Polsat	Poland
KNF	Knauf Team	Poland
MBK	MBK–Cycles–Scout	Poland
LEG	Legia–Bazyliszek	Poland
RBA	Riberalves–Alcobaça	Portugal
ASC	Vitória–ASC	Portugal
PRM	Paredes Rota dos Moveis–Beira Tamega	Portugal
BHL	Barbot–Halcon	Portugal
CAB	Carvalhelhos–Boavista	Portugal
MAI	Maia Milaneza	Portugal
MAD	Madeinox–BRIC–AR Canelas	Portugal
LAL	LA Aluminios–Liberty Seguros	Portugal
DUJ	Duja–Tavira	Portugal
IMO	Imoholding–Jardim Hotel Loulé	Portugal
KOF	Tinkoff Restaurants	Russia
PRE	Premier	Russia
ODM	Omnibike Dynamo Moscow	Russia
END	Team Endeka	Serbia
PER	Perutnina Ptuj	Slovenia
RAR	Radenska Powerbar	Slovenia
SAK	Sava	Slovenia
ADR	Adria Mobil	Slovenia
HAD	Hadimec	Switzerland
DUK	Dukla Trenčín	Slovakia

=== List of 2006 UCI Oceania Tour teams ===
Code	Official team name	Country
SLV	Savings & Loans Cycling Team	Australia
SAI	SouthAustralia.com–AIS	Australia
FRF	FRF Couriers–ExcelPro	Australia
DPC	Drapac Porsche	Australia

Preceded by 2005	List of UCI Professional Continental and Continental teams 2006	Succeeded by 2007
