= 2016 Prueba Villafranca de Ordizia =

2016 UCI Europe Tour

Race details
- Dates: 25 July 2016
- Stages: 1
- Distance: 165.7 km (103.0 mi)
- Winning time: 3h 49' 50"

Results
	Winner	Simon Yates (GBR)	(Orica–BikeExchange)
	Second	Ángel Madrazo (ESP)	(Caja Rural–Seguros RGA)
	Third	Alexander Vdovin (RUS)	(Lokosphinx)

The 2016 Prueba Villafranca de Ordizia was the 93rd edition of the Prueba Villafranca de Ordizia road bicycle race. The race took place on 25 July 2016. It was won by British rider Simon Yates.

== Race report ==
An overcast and sticky morning in Northern Spain welcomed the riders to the start line for the early roll out towards the hills of the Basque country.

A nine-rider breakaway formed early in the stage and including Christian Meier of Orica–BikeExchange.

After 45 kilometers of racing the leaders had over four minutes advantage with much climbing ahead.

Orica–BikeExchange controlled the front of the race for most of the 165.7 kilometers before super-domestique Damien Howson moved up the road as the breakaway was neutralized towards the final climb.

Howson perfectly set up Simon Yates for the winning move with a blistering attack ahead of the final climb, thinning out the field before the acceleration of Yates.

With a few kilometers to go Yates made the decisive attack on the last climb, holding off Angel Madrazo, Alexander Vdovin, Javier Moreno, and David Belda to take an impressive solo victory and set the race record for the fastest ascent of the final climb.

== Results ==
	Cyclist	Team	Time
1	Simon Yates (GBR)	Orica–BikeExchange	3h 49' 50"
2	Ángel Madrazo (ESP)	Caja Rural–Seguros RGA	+ 34"
3	Alexander Vdovin (RUS)	Lokosphinx	s.t.
4	Javier Moreno (ESP)	Movistar Team	s.t.
5	David Belda (ESP)	Team Roth	s.t.
6	Hugh Carthy (GBR)	Caja Rural–Seguros RGA	+ 43"
7	Karol Domagalski (POL)	ONE Pro Cycling	+ 46"
8	Garikoitz Bravo (ESP)	Euskadi Basque Country–Murias	s.t.
9	Pello Bilbao (ESP)	Caja Rural–Seguros RGA	s.t.
10	Sergio Higuita (COL)	Team Manzana Postobón	s.t.
