= Portuguese National Time Trial Championships =

National road cycling championship in Portugal

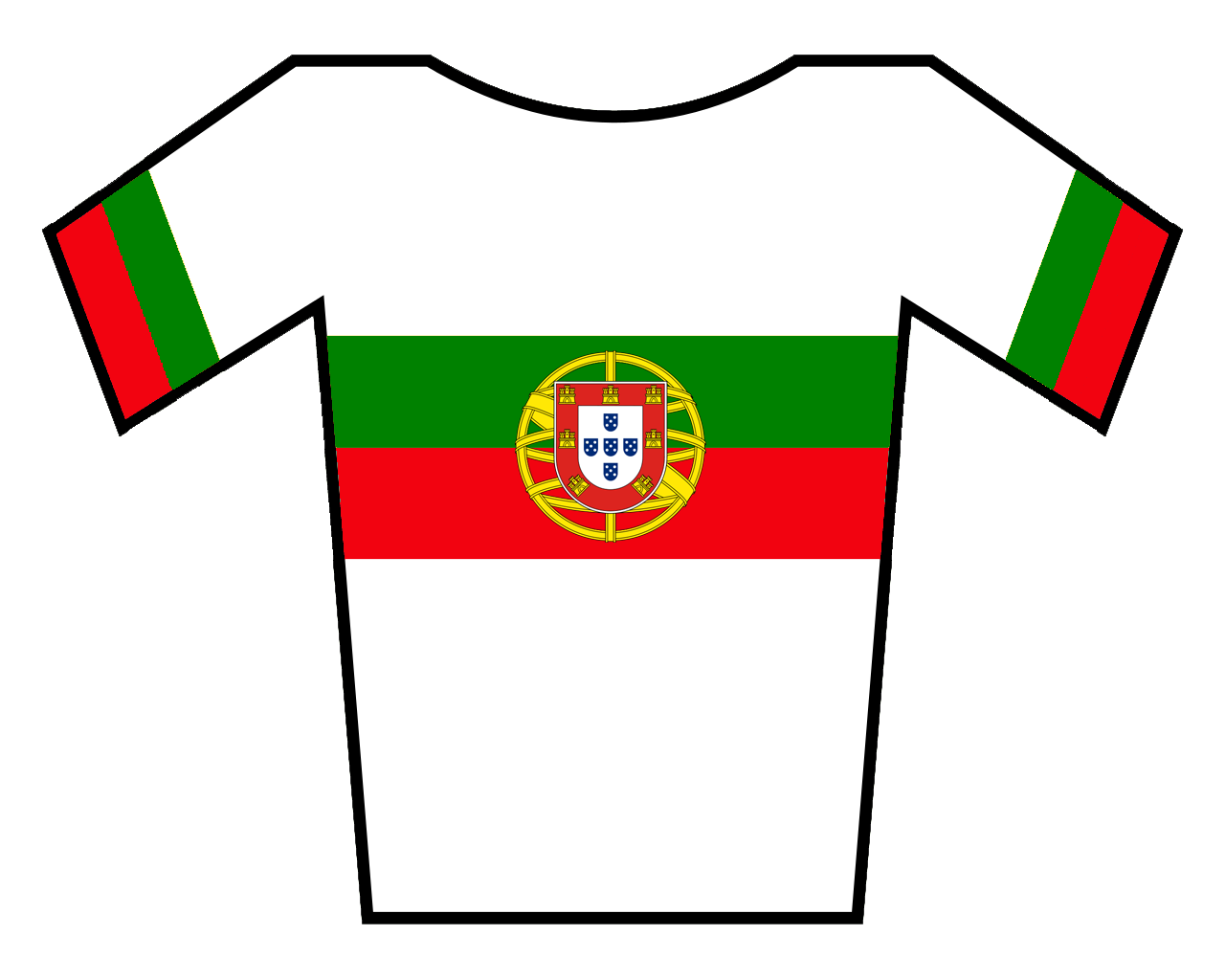

The Portuguese National Time Trial Championships have been held since 1996.

== Multiple winners ==
Men

| Wins | Name | Years |
|---|---|---|
| 4 | Nelson Oliveira | 2011, 2014, 2015, 2016 |
| 3 | José Azevedo | 1996, 1997, 2001 |
| 2 | Vítor Gamito | 1999, 2000 |
| 2 | Joaquim Andrade | 2002, 2003 |
| 2 | Sérgio Paulinho | 2004, 2008 |
| 2 | Rui Costa | 2010, 2013 |
| 2 | José Gonçalves | 2012, 2019 |
| 2 | Domingos Gonçalves | 2017, 2018 |
| 2 | António Morgado | 2024, 2025 |

Women

| Wins | Name | Years |
|---|---|---|
| 5 | Isabel Caetano | 2003, 2004, 2007, 2008, 2011 |
| 5 | Daniela Reis | 2013, 2015, 2016, 2018, 2019 |
| 3 | Daniela Campos | 2021, 2022, 2024 |

== Men ==
António Morgado wearing the National jersey in 2026

| Year | Gold | Silver | Bronze |
| 1996 | José Azevedo | Paolo-Jorge Ferreira | Cândido Barbosa |
| 1997 | José Azevedo | Alberto Amaral | Joaquim-Alberto Sampaio |
| 1998 | Alberto Carlos Amaral Amorim | Vítor Gamito | Joaquim Andrade |
| 1999 | Vítor Gamito | Joaquim Andrade | José Azevedo |
| 2000 | Vítor Gamito | Joaquim Andrade | Vidal Fitas Pereira |
| 2001 | José Azevedo | Vidal Fitas Pereira | Pedro Lopes Goncalves |
| 2002 | Joaquim Andrade | Pedro-Manuel Andrade | Renato Silva |
| 2003 | Joaquim Andrade | Renato Silva | Bruno Castanheira |
| 2004 | Sérgio Paulinho | Hugo Sabido | Renato Silva |
| 2005 | Cândido Barbosa | Joaquim-Alberto Sampaio | Hernano Broco |
| 2006 | Helder Duarte Miranda | Bruno Castanheira | Joaquim Andrade |
| 2007 | Ricardo Martins | José Azevedo | Joaquim-Alberto Sampaio |
| 2008 | Sérgio Paulinho | Tiago Machado | Heldér Oliveira |
| 2009 | Tiago Machado | Cândido Barbosa | José Mendes |
| 2010 | Rui Costa | Sérgio Sousa | Mário Costa |
| 2011 | Nelson Oliveira | Hugo Sabido | Hernâni Brôco |
| 2012 | José Gonçalves | Ricardo Vilela | Sérgio Sousa |
| 2013 | Rui Costa | Domingos Gonçalves | Hugo Sabido |
| 2014 | Nelson Oliveira | Rui Costa | Sérgio Sousa |
| 2015 | Nelson Oliveira | Tiago Machado | José Mendes |
| 2016 | Nelson Oliveira | José Mendes | Rafael Reis |
| 2017 | Domingos Gonçalves | Rafael Reis | Sérgio Paulinho |
| 2018 | Domingos Gonçalves | José Gonçalves | Tiago Machado |
| 2019 | José Gonçalves | Domingos Gonçalves | António Carvalho |
| 2020 | Ivo Oliveira | Rui Costa | Tiago Machado |
| 2021 | João Almeida | Rafael Reis | José Fernandes |
| 2022 | Rafael Reis | Ivo Oliveira | João Almeida |
| 2023 | João Almeida | Ivo Oliveira | Joaquim Silva |
| 2024 | António Morgado | Ivo Oliveira | Rui Costa |
| 2025 | António Morgado | Rafael Reis | Ivo Oliveira |

== Women ==
| Year | Gold | Silver | Bronze |
| 1999 | Claudia Vitorino | Irina Coelho | Liliana Rocha |
| 2000 | | | |
| 2001 | | | |
| 2002 | | | |
| 2003 | Isabel Caetano | Ana Rita Vigario | Sonia Campos |
| 2004 | Isabel Caetano | Ana Rita Vigario | Cristina Azevedo |
| 2005 | | | |
| 2006 | Alice Azevedo | Ana Rita Vigario | Isabel Caetano |
| 2007 | Isabel Caetano | Ana Rita Vigario | Ester Alves |
| 2008 | Isabel Caetano | Ester Alves | Anais Verguet |
| 2009 | Ester Alves | Angela Fernandes | Ana Rita Vigario |
| 2010 | Vanessa Fernandes | Anais Moniz | Isabel Caetano |
| 2011 | Isabel Caetano | Ester Alves | Andrea Ponte |
| 2012 | Vanessa Sofia Pereira | Ana Rita Vigario | Isabel Caetano |
| 2013 | Daniela Reis | Isabel Caetano | Ana Isabel Dias |
| 2014 | Katarina Larsson | Celina Carpinteiro | Isabel Caetano |
| 2015 | Daniela Reis | Ana Rita Valido | Liliana Jesus |
| 2016 | Daniela Reis | Celina Carpinteiro | Katarina Larsson |
| 2017 | Soraia Silva | Sandra Santos | Celina Carpinteiro |
| 2018 | Daniela Reis | Maria Martins | Soraia Silva |
| 2019 | Daniela Reis | Liliana Jesus | Melissa Maia |
| 2020 | Raquel Queirós | Vera Vilaca | Melissa Maia |
| 2021 | Daniela Campos | Ana Caramelo | Liliana Jesus |
| 2022 | Daniela Campos | Beatriz Pereira | Ana Caramelo |
| 2023 | Ana Caramelo | Vera Vilaca | Alessia Teixeira |
| 2024 | Daniela Campos | Ana Caramelo | Vera Vilaca |
| 2025 | Beatriz Roxo | Ana Caramelo | Raquel Dias |

== See also ==
- Portuguese National Road Race Championships
- National road cycling championships
