= Rui Vinhas =

Portuguese cyclist

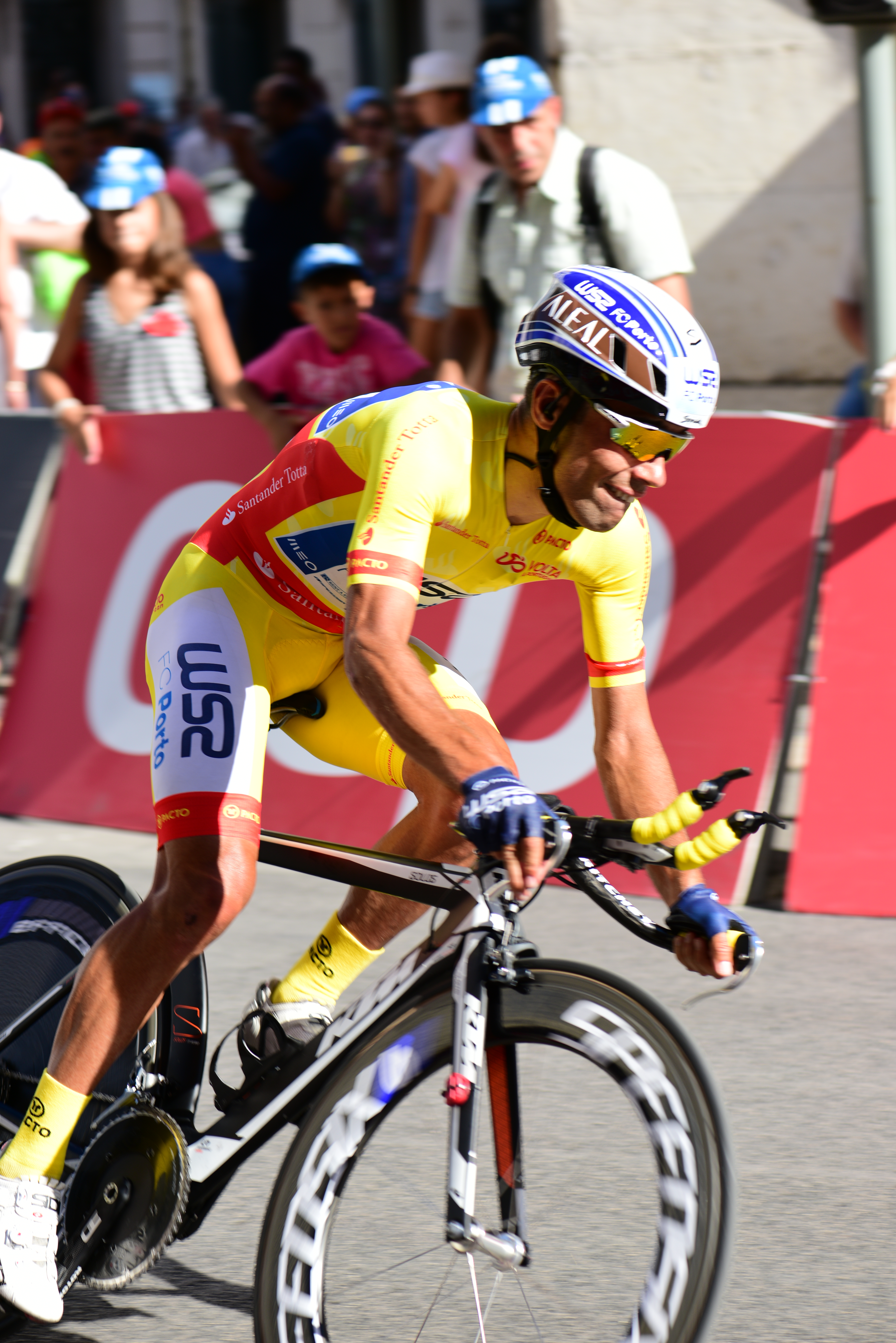
- Vinhas in 2016

Personal information
- Full name: Rui Pedro Carvalho Vinhas
- Born: 6 December 1986 (age 39) Sobrado, Portugal
- Height: 1.71 m (5 ft 7 in)
- Weight: 59 kg (130 lb)

Cycling career
- Sport: Cycling
- Current team: Suspended
- Discipline: Road
- Role: Rider

Amateur teams
- 2005–2010: Casactiva–Quinta das Arcas–UCS
- 2012: CC Loulé–Louletano–Aquashow

Professional teams
- 2011: LA–Antarte
- 2013–2014: Louletano–Dunas Douradas
- 2015: W52–Quinta da Lixa
- 2016: W52 / FC Porto / Porto Canal
- 2017: W52 / FC Porto / Mestre da Cor
- 2018–2022: W52 / FC Porto

Rui Pedro Carvalho Vinhas (born 6 December 1986) is a Portuguese cyclist who last rode for UCI Continental team W52 / FC Porto.

On 4 October 2022, he received a three-year ban by UCI for doping.

== Major results ==
2016
1st Overall Volta a Portugal
2017
2nd Road race, National Road Championships
3rd Klasika Primavera
2019
6th Overall Tour du Limousin

== See also ==
- Doping in sport
- List of doping cases in cycling
