= Rafael Reis =

Portuguese bicycle racer (born 1992)

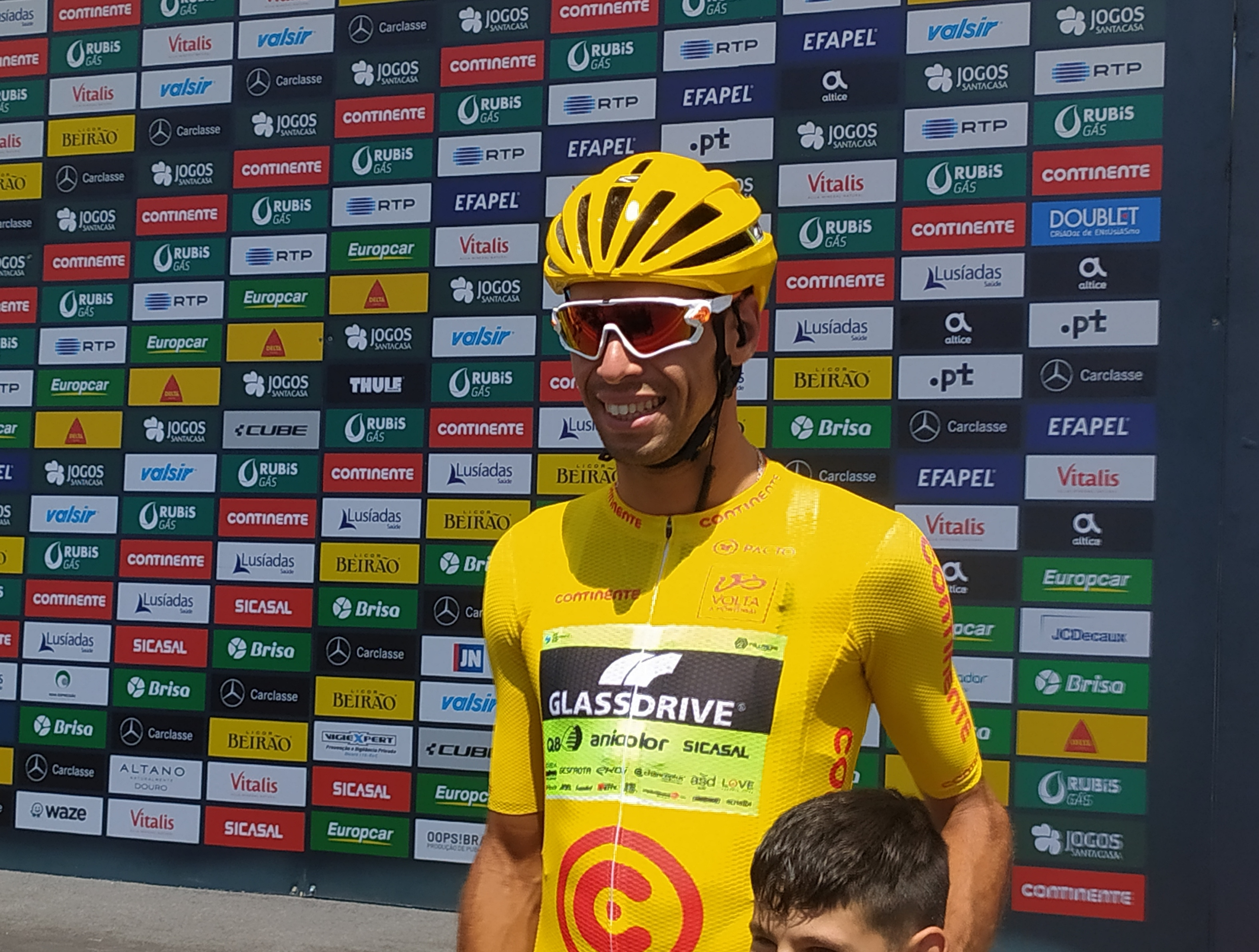

Personal information
- Full name: Rafael Ferreira Reis
- Born: 15 July 1992 (age 34) Setúbal, Portugal
- Height: 1.90 m (6 ft 3 in)
- Weight: 72 kg (159 lb)

Cycling career
- Sport: Cycling
- Current team: Anicolor / Campicarn
- Discipline: Road
- Role: Rider
- Rider type: Time trialist

Amateur teams
- 2007–2008: Munditubo–CC Aldeia de Paio Pires
- 2009–2010: CA Alcobaça–C. Oliveira
- 2011: Biccó
- 2012: Caja Rural U23

Professional teams
- 2013: Ceramica Flaminia–Fondriest
- 2014–2015: Banco BIC–Carmim
- 2016: W52 / FC Porto / Porto Canal
- 2017–2018: Caja Rural–Seguros RGA
- 2019: W52 / FC Porto
- 2020: Feirense
- 2021–: Efapel

Major wins
- One-day races and Classics National Time Trial Championships (2022)
Medal record
Men's road cycling
Representing Portugal
Mediterranean Games
Gold medal – first place	2022 Oran	Time trial
Bronze medal – third place	2026 Taranto	Time trial

Rafael Ferreira Reis (born 15 July 1992 in Setúbal) is a Portuguese cyclist, who currently rides for UCI Continental team Anicolor / Campicarn.

== Career ==
He was named in the startlist for the 2017 Vuelta a España.

== Major results ==
2009
1st Time trial, National Junior Road Championships
2010
Youth Olympic Games

1st Time trial
2nd Road race

National Junior Road Championships

1st Time trial
1st Road race

UEC European Junior Road Championships

3rd Road race
6th Time trial

5th Overall Trofeo Karlsberg
UCI Juniors Road World Championships

6th Time trial
7th Road race

9th Overall Course de la Paix Juniors

1st Stage 3 (ITT)

9th Paris–Roubaix Juniors
2011
2nd Time trial, National Under-23 Road Championships
7th Overall Volta ao Alentejo
2013
1st Time trial, National Under-23 Road Championships
2014
1st Time trial, National Under-23 Road Championships
4th Time trial, UCI Under-23 Road World Championships
2015
4th Time trial, National Road Championships
2016
1st Prologue Troféu Joaquim Agostinho
1st Prologue Volta a Portugal
3rd Time trial, National Road Championships
7th Overall Vuelta a Castilla y León
10th Overall Volta ao Alentejo
2017
2nd Time trial, National Road Championships
2018
1st Prologue Troféu Joaquim Agostinho
1st Prologue Volta a Portugal
2020
4th Time trial, National Road Championships
2021
Volta a Portugal

1st Points classification
1st Prologue, Stages 1, 7 & 10 (ITT)

3rd Overall Volta ao Alentejo
2022
1st Time trial, Mediterranean Games
1st Time trial, National Road Championships
5th Overall Volta ao Alentejo
2023
1st Overall Grande Prémio Jornal de Notícias
1st Overall Grande Prémio Abimota

1st Prologue

1st Prologue Volta a Portugal
3rd Overall Grande Prémio O Jogo
4th Road race, National Road Championships
2024
1st Prologue Volta a Portugal
1st Prologue Troféu Joaquim Agostinho
4th Time trial, National Road Championships

=== Grand Tour general classification results timeline ===
Grand Tour	2017
Giro d'Italia	—
Tour de France	—
Vuelta a España	132

Legend
—	Did not compete
DNF	Did not finish
