= Jesús Ezquerra =

Spanish bicycle racer

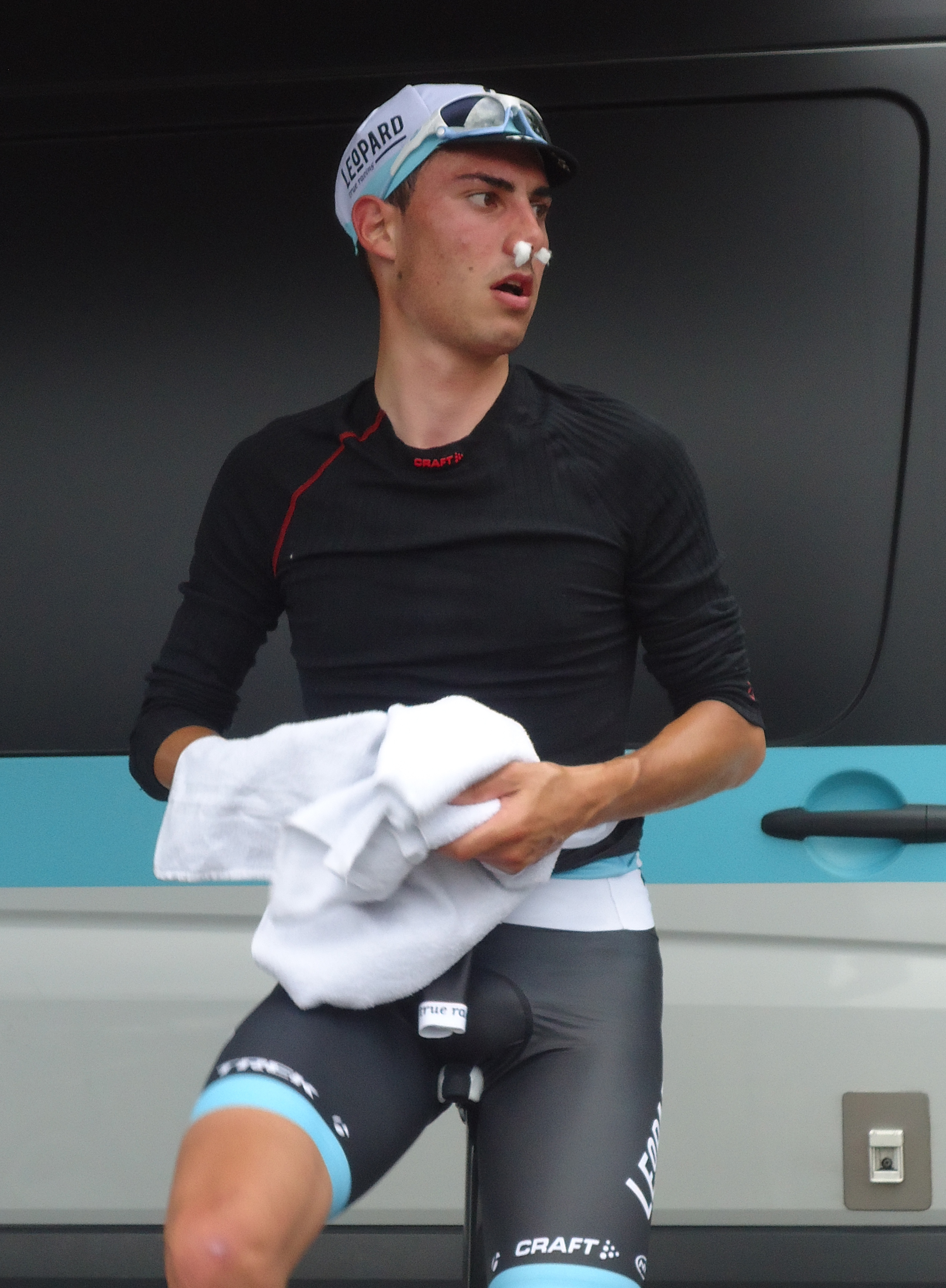
- Ezquerra in 2012.

Personal information
- Full name: Jesús Ezquerra Muela
- Born: 30 November 1990 (age 35) Adal-Treto, Spain
- Height: 1.85 m (6 ft 1 in)
- Weight: 67 kg (148 lb)

Cycling career
- Sport: Cycling
- Current team: Retired
- Discipline: Road
- Role: Rider

Amateur team
- 2009–2011: Cueva El Soplao

Professional teams
- 2012–2013: Leopard–Trek Continental Team
- 2014–2015: ActiveJet
- 2016–2017: Sporting / Tavira
- 2018–2024: Burgos BH

Managerial team
- 2025–: Burgos Burpellet BH

Jesús Ezquerra Muela (born 30 November 1990 in Adal-Treto, Cantabria) is a retired Spanish cyclist, who last rode for UCI ProTeam Burgos BH. He now works as an assistant sports director in the team. In August 2018, he was named in the startlist for the Vuelta a España.

== Major results ==
2013
1st Stage 1 (TTT) Czech Cycling Tour
6th Overall Istrian Spring Trophy
2016
1st Stage 8 Volta a Portugal
4th Overall Volta ao Alentejo
9th Overall GP Liberty Seguros
2018
4th Circuito de Getxo
Combativity award Stage 10 Vuelta a España
2020
Combativity award Stage 4 Vuelta a España
2021
6th Vuelta a Murcia
2022
1st Sprints classification Vuelta a Asturias
6th Clàssica Comunitat Valenciana 1969
9th Trofeo Alcúdia – Port d'Alcúdia
9th Vuelta a Murcia

=== Grand Tour general classification results timeline ===
Grand Tour	2018	2019	2020	2021	2022	2023
Giro d'Italia	—	—	—	—	—	—
Tour de France	—	—	—	—	—	—
Vuelta a España	98	120	89	—	68	89

Legend
—	Did not compete
DNF	Did not finish
