= 2019 GP Miguel Induráin =

2019 UCI Europe Tour

Race details
- Dates: 6 April 2019
- Stages: 1
- Distance: 196 km (122 mi)
- Winning time: 4h 47' 56"

Results
	Winner	Jonathan Hivert (FRA)	(Direct Énergie)
	Second	Luis León Sánchez (ESP)	(Astana)
	Third	Sergio Higuita (COL)	(Fundación Euskadi)

The 2019 GP Miguel Induráin was the 66th edition of the GP Miguel Induráin cycle race and was held on 6 April 2019 as part of the 2019 UCI Europe Tour. The race started and finished in Estella. The race was won by Jonathan Hivert.

== Teams ==
Eighteen teams were invited to take part in the race. These included four UCI WorldTeams, nine UCI Professional Continental teams, and five UCI Continental teams.

UCI WorldTeams

- Astana
- Mitchelton–Scott
- Movistar Team
- UAE Team Emirates

UCI Professional Continental Teams

- Burgos BH
- Caja Rural–Seguros RGA
- Cofidis
- Direct Énergie
- Euskadi–Murias
- Israel Cycling Academy
- Team Manzana Postobón
- Team Novo Nordisk
- W52 / FC Porto

UCI Continental Teams

- Fundación Euskadi
- Guerciotti–Kiwi Atlantico
- Lokosphinx
- Rádio Popular–Boavista
- Vito–Feirense–PNB

== Results ==
Result
Rank	Rider	Team	Time
1	Jonathan Hivert (FRA)	Direct Énergie	4h 47' 56"
2	Luis León Sánchez (ESP)	Astana	+ 9"
3	Sergio Higuita (COL)	Fundación Euskadi	+ 9"
4	Mikel Nieve (ESP)	Mitchelton–Scott	+ 9"
5	Carlos Verona (ESP)	Movistar Team	+ 9"
6	Tadej Pogačar (SLO)	UAE Team Emirates	+ 9"
7	Fernando Barceló (ESP)	Euskadi–Murias	+ 9"
8	Jonathan Lastra (ESP)	Caja Rural–Seguros RGA	+ 21"
9	Alexander Vdovin (RUS)	Lokosphinx	+ 24"
10	Rubén Plaza (ESP)	Israel Cycling Academy	+ 28"
