= Volta ao Distrito de Santarém =

Race details
- Date: March
- Region: Santarém, Portugal
- English name: Tour of Santarém District
- Local name(s): Volta ao Distrito de Santarém (in Portuguese)
- Discipline: Road
- Competition: UCI Europe Tour
- Type: Stage race
- Web site: www.pad.pt/2007/VoltaSantarem/

History
- First edition: 1997
- Editions: 12
- Final edition: 2008
- First winner: Saulius Sarkauskas (LTU)
- Most wins: Cândido Barbosa (POR) (3 wins)
- Final winner: Maurizio Biondo (ITA)

The Volta ao Distrito de Santarém (in Portuguese) (Tour of Santarém District) was a multi-day road cycling race held annually in the District of Santárem, Portugal. From 2006 to 2008, it was organised as a 2.1 event on the UCI Europe Tour. The race was created in 1997 and underwent several changes throughout its existence.

== Winners ==
Year	Winner	Second	Third
Gran Premio Internacional Telecom
1997	(Lithuania) Saulius Šarkauskas	(Portugal) Cândido Barbosa	(United Kingdom) Jeremy Hunt
1998	(Portugal) Cândido Barbosa	(Poland) Jacek Mickiewicz	(Portugal) Manuel Pedro Liberato
1999	(Italy) Paolo Lanfranchi	(Spain) Mikel Pradera	(Switzerland) Felice Puttini
Gran Premio Portugal Telecom
2000	(Portugal) José Azevedo	(Spain) José Alberto Martínez	(Spain) Aitor Osa
Gran Premio Mosqueteros-Ruta del Marqués
2001	(Spain) Igor González de Galdeano	(Portugal) Vítor Gamito	(Spain) Melcior Mauri
2002	(Portugal) Rui Lavarinhas	(Spain) Joan Horrach	(Portugal) Bruno Castanheira
2003	(Portugal) Cândido Barbosa	(Russia) Alexei Markov	(Denmark) Claus Michael Møller
Gran Premio Estremadura-RTP
2004	(Spain) Carlos García Quesada	(Portugal) Cândido Barbosa	(Costa Rica) José Adrián Bonilla
Gran Premio Internacional del Oeste RTP
2005	(Portugal) Cândido Barbosa	(Spain) Aitor Pérez Arrieta	(Spain) Carlos Castaño
Volta ao Distrito de Santarém
2006	(Netherlands) Lars Boom	(Australia) Benjamin Day	(Spain) Manuel Lloret
2007	(South Africa) Robert Hunter	(Argentina) Martín Garrido	(Netherlands) Lars Boom
2008	(Italy) Maurizio Biondo	(Hungary) László Bodrogi	(Germany) Andreas Klöden
