= José Gonçalves (cyclist) =

Portuguese cyclist (born 1989)

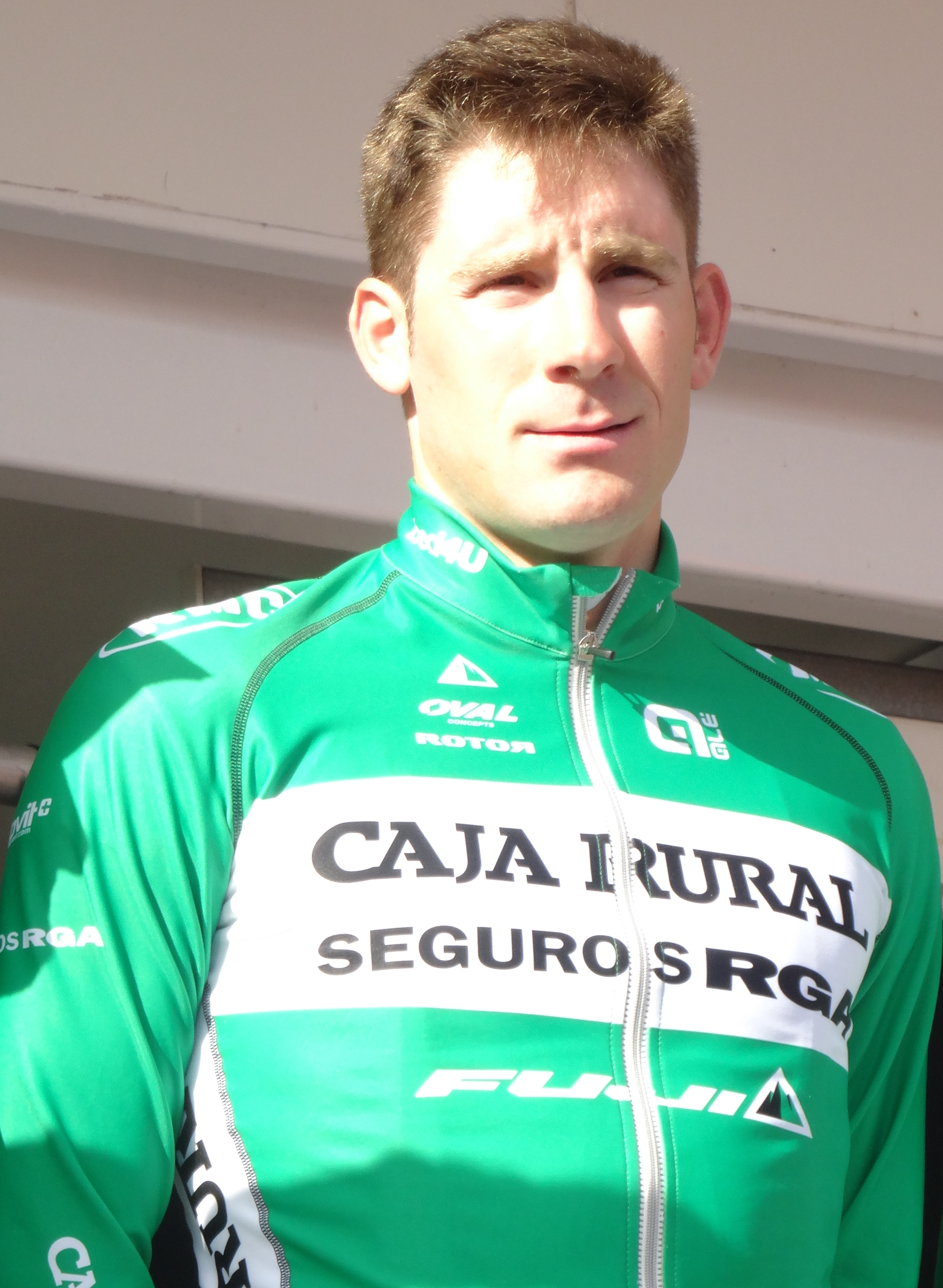
- Gonçalves in 2015.

Personal information
- Full name: José Isidro Gonçalves Maciel
- Born: 13 February 1989 (age 37) Barcelos, Portugal
- Height: 1.84 m (6 ft 1/2 in)
- Weight: 71 kg (157 lb; 11 st 3 lb)

Cycling career
- Sport: Cycling
- Current team: W52 / FC Porto
- Discipline: Road
- Role: Rider
- Rider type: Puncheur

Amateur teams
- 2005–2007: ACR Roriz–Pedal Clube
- 2008–2009: Santa Maria da Feira–E Leclerc–Moreira Congelados
- 2010–2011: Liberty Seguros–Santa Maria da Feira

Professional teams
- 2012: Onda
- 2013–2014: La Pomme Marseille
- 2015–2016: Caja Rural–Seguros RGA
- 2017–2019: Team Katusha–Alpecin
- 2020–2021: Nippo–Delko–One Provence
- 2022: W52 / FC Porto

Major wins
- Stage races Tour of Turkey (2016) Ster ZLM Toer (2017) One-day races and Classics National Time Trial Championships (2012, 2019)

José Isidro Gonçalves Maciel (born 13 February 1989) is a Portuguese cyclist, who last rode for UCI Continental team W52 / FC Porto. He rode in the 2015 Vuelta a España. His biggest win to date was the overall at the 2016 Tour of Turkey. He was named in the start list for the 2017 Giro d'Italia. In July 2019, he was named in the startlist for the 2019 Tour de France. On 12 April 2023, he received a four-year ban by UCI for doping.

== Major results ==
2009
2nd Time trial, National Under-23 Road Championships
2011
1st Time trial, National Under-23 Road Championships
1st Stage 2 Volta a Coruña
2nd Volta a Portugal do Futuro
8th Road race, UEC European Under-23 Road Championships
2012
1st Time trial, National Road Championships
1st Stage 1 GP Efapel
3rd Overall Troféu Joaquim Agostinho

1st Young rider classification

6th Overall Volta ao Alentejo
2013
1st Polynormande
1st Mountains classification Paris–Arras Tour
3rd Overall Tour of China I
2014
4th Overall Tour of Hainan
6th Overall Tour of Qinghai Lake
2015
1st Stage 5 Volta a Portugal
4th Overall Boucles de la Mayenne
Combativity award Stage 2 Vuelta a España
2016
1st Overall Presidential Tour of Turkey
1st Stage 2 GP Beiras e Serra da Estrela
1st Stage 7 Volta a Portugal
4th Time trial, National Road Championships
5th Overall Boucles de la Mayenne
7th Boucles de l'Aulne
2017
1st Overall Ster ZLM Toer

1st Stage 4

4th Road race, National Road Championships
2018
2nd Time trial, National Road Championships
2019
1st Time trial, National Road Championships
2022
6th Overall Volta ao Alentejo

=== Grand Tour general classification results timeline ===
Grand Tour	2015	2016	2017	2018	2019
Giro d'Italia	—	—	60	14	—
Tour de France	—	—	—	—	128
Vuelta a España	34	DNF	DNF	DNF	—

Legend
—	Did not compete
DNF	Did not finish
