= Louise Hansen (cyclist) =

Danish cyclist (born 1995)

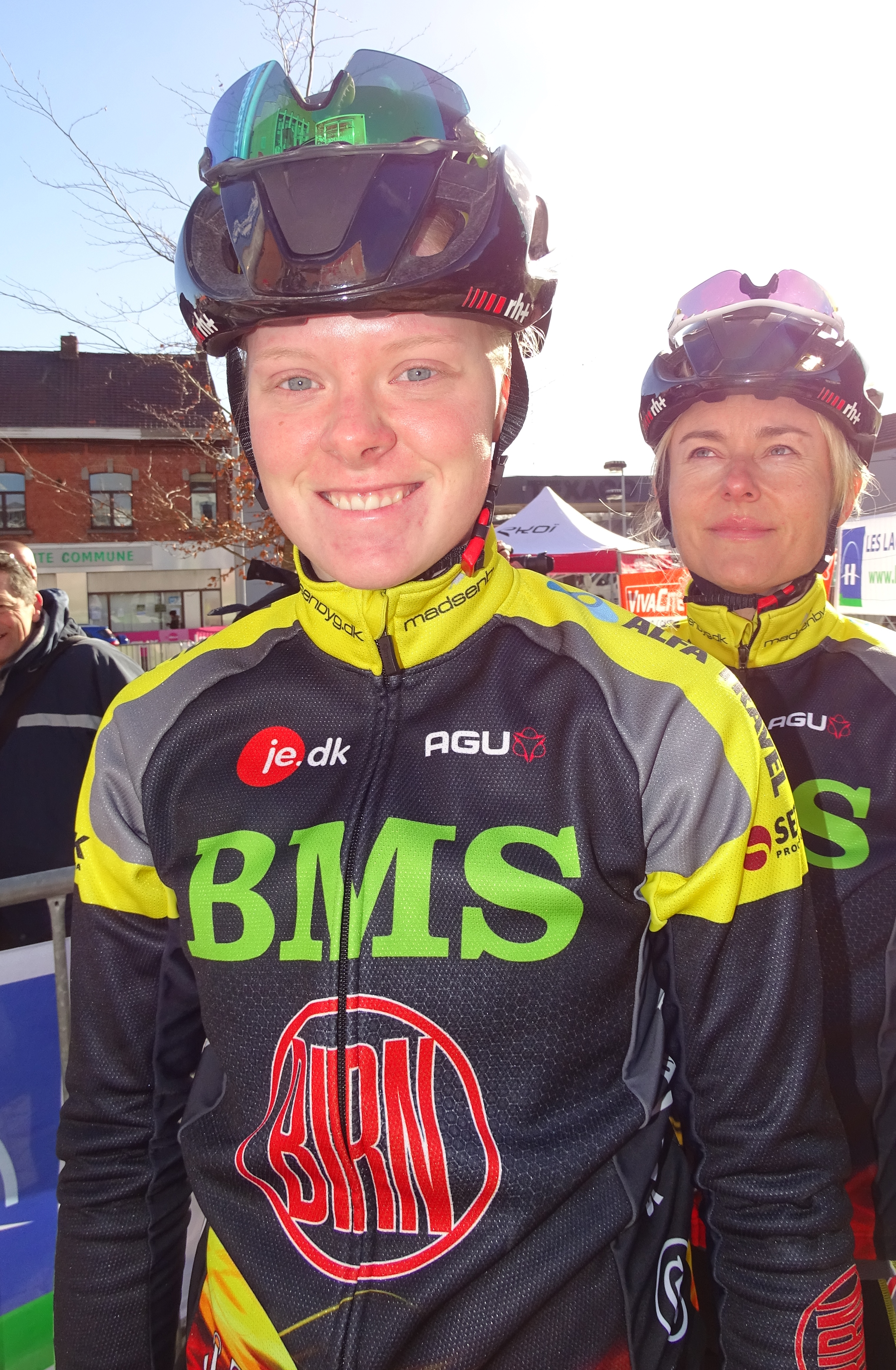
- Hansen in 2016

Personal information
- Full name: Louise Norman Hansen
- Born: 12 February 1995 (age 31) Nørre Søby, Southern Denmark

Cycling career
- Sport: Cycling
- Discipline: Road
- Role: Rider
- Rider type: Time trialist

Amateur team
- 2020: Illi-Bikes Cycling Team

Professional team
- 2016–2019: Team BMS BIRN

Louise Norman Hansen (born 12 February 1995) is a Danish racing cyclist, who most recently rode for Belgian amateur team Illi-Bikes Cycling Team. She is the sister of racing cyclist Lasse Norman Hansen.

== Major results ==
2017
3rd Time trial, National Road Championships
2019
1st Time trial, National Road Championships

== See also ==
- List of 2016 UCI Women's Teams and riders
