= João Gaspar =

Brazilian cyclist (born 1992)

Personal information
- Full name: João Marcelo Gaspar Pereira
- Born: 19 February 1992 (age 34) Sete Quedas, Brazil

Cycling career
- Sport: Cycling
- Discipline: Road
- Role: Rider

Amateur teams
- 2010: Clube de Ponta Porã
- 2011: Pastorinho–Semepp–Presidente Prudente
- 2012: Sportix–Assis–AMEA
- 2013: Iron Age–Colner–Sorocaba
- 2014: World Cycling Centre

Professional teams
- 2014: Ironage–Colner
- 2015: Team Ecuador
- 2015–2016: Carrefour Funvic Soul Cycling Team

João Marcelo Gaspar Pereira (born 19 February 1992) is a Brazilian cyclist. He is 5' 5'' and weighs 121 lbs.

== Major results ==
2012
9th Copa América de Ciclismo
2013
1st Road race, National Under-23 Road Championships
2nd Overall Giro do Interior de São Paulo

1st Prologue & Stage 2

6th Overall Tour do Rio

1st Mountains classification
1st Young rider classification

2014
1st Prologue Giro do Interior de São Paulo
3rd Overall Tour do Brasil

1st Mountains classification
1st Stage 5

2015
1st Mountains classification Istrian Spring Trophy
1st Mountains classification Tour do Rio
2016
8th Road race, Pan American Road Championships
