= Alexander Vdovin =

Russian cyclist

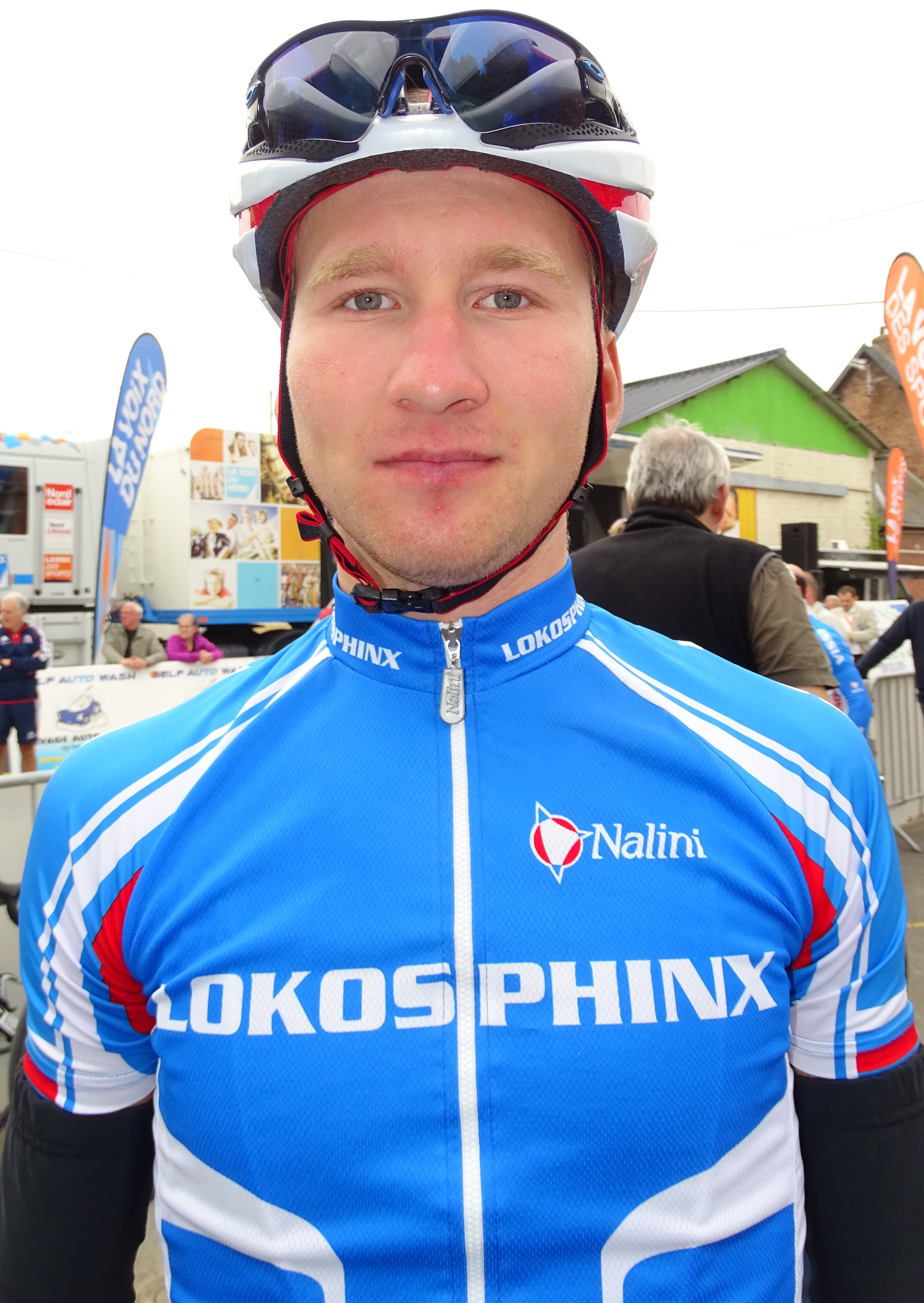
- Vdovin in 2015

Personal information
- Full name: Alexander Vdovin; Russian: Александр Вдовин
- Born: 21 August 1993 (age 33) Votkinsk, Russia

Cycling career
- Sport: Cycling
- Current team: Lokosphinx
- Discipline: Road
- Role: Rider

Amateur teams
- 2013: Lokosphinx Amateur
- 2013: Lokosphinx (stagiaire)

Professional team
- 2014–: Lokosphinx

Alexander Vdovin (Russian: Александр Вдовин; born 21 August 1993) is a Russian cyclist, who currently rides for UCI Continental team Lokosphinx. His twin brother Sergey Vdovin is also a professional cyclist.

== Major results ==
2016
1st Young rider classification Volta a Portugal
3rd Prueba Villafranca de Ordizia
2017
8th Prueba Villafranca de Ordizia
2018
1st Stage 3 Tour of Iran (Azerbaijan)
2019
9th GP Miguel Induráin
