= Daniela Reis =

Portuguese cyclist

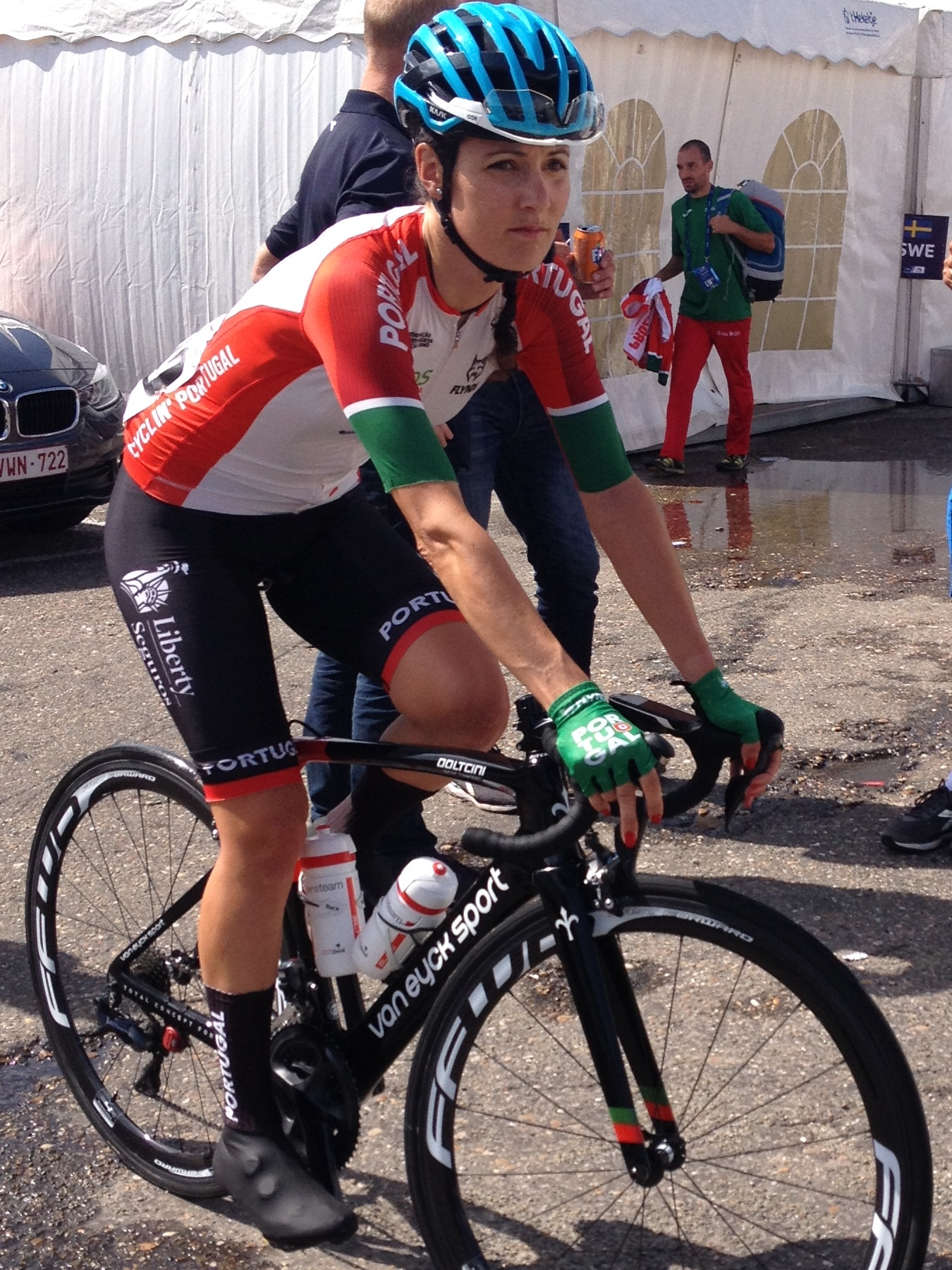
- Reis at the 2019 European Road Championships

Personal information
- Full name: Daniela da Conceição Alexandre Reis
- Born: 6 April 1993 (age 33) Sobral de Monte Agraço, Portugal

Cycling career
- Sport: Cycling
- Current team: Retired
- Disciplines: Road; Track
- Role: Rider

Amateur team
- 2015–2016: DN 17 Poitou-Charentes

Professional teams
- 2017–2019: Lares–Waowdeals
- 2020: Ciclotel

Daniela da Conceição Alexandre Reis (born 6 April 1993) is a Portuguese former racing cyclist, who rode professionally between 2017 and 2020 for UCI Women's Continental Teams Doltcini–Van Eyck Sport and Ciclotel. She rode at the 2014 UCI Road World Championships, and won nine national road titles at the elite level.

== Major results ==
2010
National Junior Road Championships

1st Time trial
2nd Road race

2011
National Junior Road Championships

1st Time trial
2nd Road race

2013
National Road Championships

1st Time trial
2nd Road race

2014
2nd Road race, National Road Championships
2015
National Road Championships

1st Road race
1st Time trial

National Track Championships

1st Points race
1st Scratch

3rd Scratch, Trofeu CAR Anadia Portugal
2016
National Road Championships

1st Road race
1st Time trial

2018
National Road Championships

1st Road race
1st Time trial

Mediterranean Games

4th Road race
4th Time trial

2019
National Road Championships

1st Road race
1st Time trial

10th Overall Vuelta a Burgos Feminas
