= Micael Isidoro =

Portuguese cyclist

Personal information
- Full name: Micael Duarte Isidoro
- Born: 12 August 1982 (age 44) Cadaval, Portugal
- Height: 1.76 m (5 ft 9 in)
- Weight: 63 kg (139 lb)

Cycling career
- Sport: Cycling
- Current team: Óbidos Cycling Team
- Discipline: Road
- Role: Rider (retired); Directeur sportif

Amateur teams
- 2001: Alcobacense-Lubrim
- 2002: Associação Alcobacense de Cultura e Desporto
- 2003–2004: Alcobaça CC-De Borla-Ruben & Rita
- 2009: Gessical–Fonotel–ACR de Ventosa
- 2010: ASC–Vitória–RTL
- 2011: CC Loulé–Louletano–Aquashow

Professional teams
- 2005–2006: Riberalves–GoldNutrition
- 2007: Vitória–ASC
- 2008: Fercase–Rota dos Móveis
- 2013–2016: Louletano–Dunas Douradas
- 2019: BAI–Sicasal–Petro de Luanda
- 2020: Atum General / Tavira / Maria Nova Hotel
- 2021: Louletano–Loulé Concelho
- 2022: ABTF–Feirense

Managerial teams
- 2023: NSJBI Victoria Sports Pro Cycling Team
- 2024–: Óbidos Cycling Team

Micael Duarte Isidoro (born 12 August 1982) is a Portuguese former road cyclist, who competed as a professional from 2005 to 2022. He now works as a directeur sportif for club team Óbidos Cycling Team.

== Major results ==
2003
1st Stage 4 Volta a Portugal do Futuro
2004
3rd Gran Premio Città di Empoli
2008
2nd Overall Tour of South China Sea

1st Stage 8

2011
1st Stage 2 Vuelta a Zamora
1st Stage 1 Volta ás Comarcas de Lugo
7th Road race, National Road Championships
2012
1st Stages 1a (TTT) & 1b Volta ás Comarcas de Lugo
8th Road race, National Road Championships
