= Vítor Gamito =

Portuguese cyclist

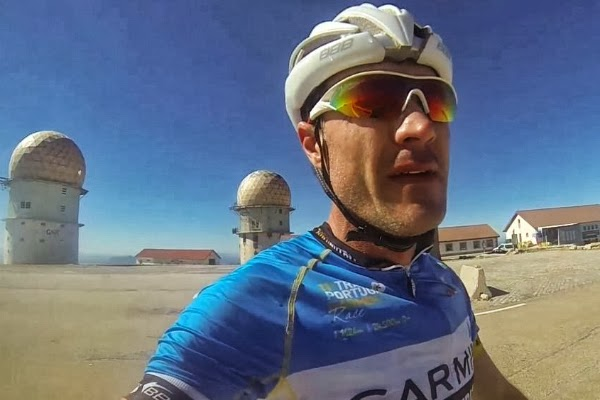

Personal information
- Full name: Vítor Manuel Gamito Gomes
- Born: 21 April 1970 (age 56) Lisbon, Portugal

Cycling career
- Sport: Cycling
- Current team: Retired
- Discipline: Road
- Role: Rider
- Rider type: Time trialist

Amateur teams
- 1985: GD Peniche
- 1986: UC da Buraca–Yoplait–Bombokas
- 1987: GD Servil
- 1988: GS de Loures–Panasonic
- 1989–1991: Troiamarisco–Mar e Sol

Professional teams
- 1992–1995: Sicasal–Acral
- 1996–1997: MX Onda
- 1998–2001: Porta da Ravessa
- 2002: Barbot–Torrie
- 2003: Cantanhede
- 2004: Milaneza–Maia
- 2014: LA Alumínios–Antarte

Managerial team
- 2005–2006: Riberalves–GoldNutrition

Major wins
- Stage races Volta a Portugal (2000) Single-day races and Classics National Time Trial Championships (1999, 2000)

Vítor Manuel Gamito Gomes (born 21 April 1970, in Lisbon) is a Portuguese former cyclist. Professional between 1992 and 2004, he was the National Time Trial Champion in 1999 and 2000. His biggest win was the Volta a Portugal, which he won in 2000 after finishing four times in second place (1993, 1994, 1997 and 1999). He participated in the Vuelta a España three times, but failed to finish all three. Gamito also represented Portugal at the 2000 Summer Olympics, participating in the road race and in the time trial.

Forced to quit cycling in May 2004 due to a heart problem, Gamito returned to the sport in 2014, riding for LA Alumínios–Antarte.

== Major results ==
1993
1st Overall Grand Prix Jornal de Noticias

1st Stages 1 & 2

2nd Overall Volta a Portugal

1st Stage 10

1994
1st Overall Grand Prix Jornal de Noticias

1st Prologue & Stage 4

1st Overall Volta ao Algarve

1st Stages 4 & 7

2nd Overall Volta a Portugal

1st Stage 13

3rd Overall Volta a Portugal do Futuro
1995
1st Stage 3 (ITT) Troféu Joaquim Agostinho
Volta a Portugal

1st Stages 4 & 13 (ITT)

Volta a Portugal do Futuro

1st 2 Stages

2nd Overall Rapport Toer
1996
2nd Overall Volta a Portugal
1997
4th Overall Vuelta Ciclista a la Comunidad Valenciana
1998
2nd Time trial, National Road Championships
2nd Overall Volta ao Alentejo
2nd Overall Troféu Joaquim Agostinho

1st Stage 4a

2nd Overall Grand Prix Jornal de Notícias

1st Stage 4

1999
1st Time trial, National Road Championships
1st Stage 1 Grand Prix Sport Noticias
2nd Overall Volta a Portugal

1st Stage 5

3rd Overall Grand Prix Abimota

1st Stage 2

2000
1st Time trial, National Road Championships
1st Overall Volta a Portugal

1st Stages 10 & 13

5th Overall Volta ao Algarve
2001
2nd Grand Prix Mosqueteiros - Rota do Marques
2003
1st Stage 6 Volta a Portugal
1st Stage 4 Volta ao Alentejo
2014
10th Time trial, National Road Championships
