= Alcobaça Clube de Ciclismo =

Portuguese professional cycling team

Team information
- UCI code: RBA
- Registered: Portugal
- Founded: 2005
- Disbanded: 2006
- Discipline: Road
- Bicycles: Trek

Key personnel
- General manager: Fernando Viera
- Team manager: Vítor Gamito

Team name history
- 2005 2006: Riberalves - GoldNutrition (RGA); Riberalves-Alcobaça (RBA)
Jersey

The professional cycling team Riberalves-Alcobaça was a Portuguese team based in Alcobaça. It was one of the European teams in UCI Continental Tour.

== Team roster ==
As of January 2008

Rider	Date of birth
Joaquim Andrade (POR)	16 August 1969 (aged 36)
Rui Carneiro (POR)	30 May 1982 (aged 23)
Mário Figueiredo (POR)	18 September 1983 (aged 22)
Micael Isidoro (POR)	12 August 1982 (aged 23)
Rui Lavarinhas (POR)	9 January 1971 (aged 34)
Hélder Miranda (POR)	23 February 1979 (aged 26)
Cláudio Paulinho (POR)	17 September 1981 (aged 24)
Bruno Rufino (POR)	1 October 1984 (aged 21)
Bruno Sá (POR)	7 September 1982 (aged 23)
Luis Sarreira (POR)	30 April 1972 (aged 33)
Pedro Soeiro (POR)	11 September 1975 (aged 30)
Hugo Vitor (POR)	8 January 1977 (aged 28)
Andrei Zintchenko (RUS)	5 January 1972 (aged 33)

== Major wins ==
2005
Portuguese Road Race Championship, Joaquim Andrade
Stage 4 Volta a Portugal, Rui Lavarinhas
2006
Stage 3 Tour do Brasil, Pedro Soeiro
Special Sprints Vuelta a Extremadura, Bruno Sá

Stage 4b, Andrei Zintchenko

Portuguese Time Trial Championship, Hélder Miranda
