= José Mendes (cyclist) =

Portuguese cyclist (born 1985)

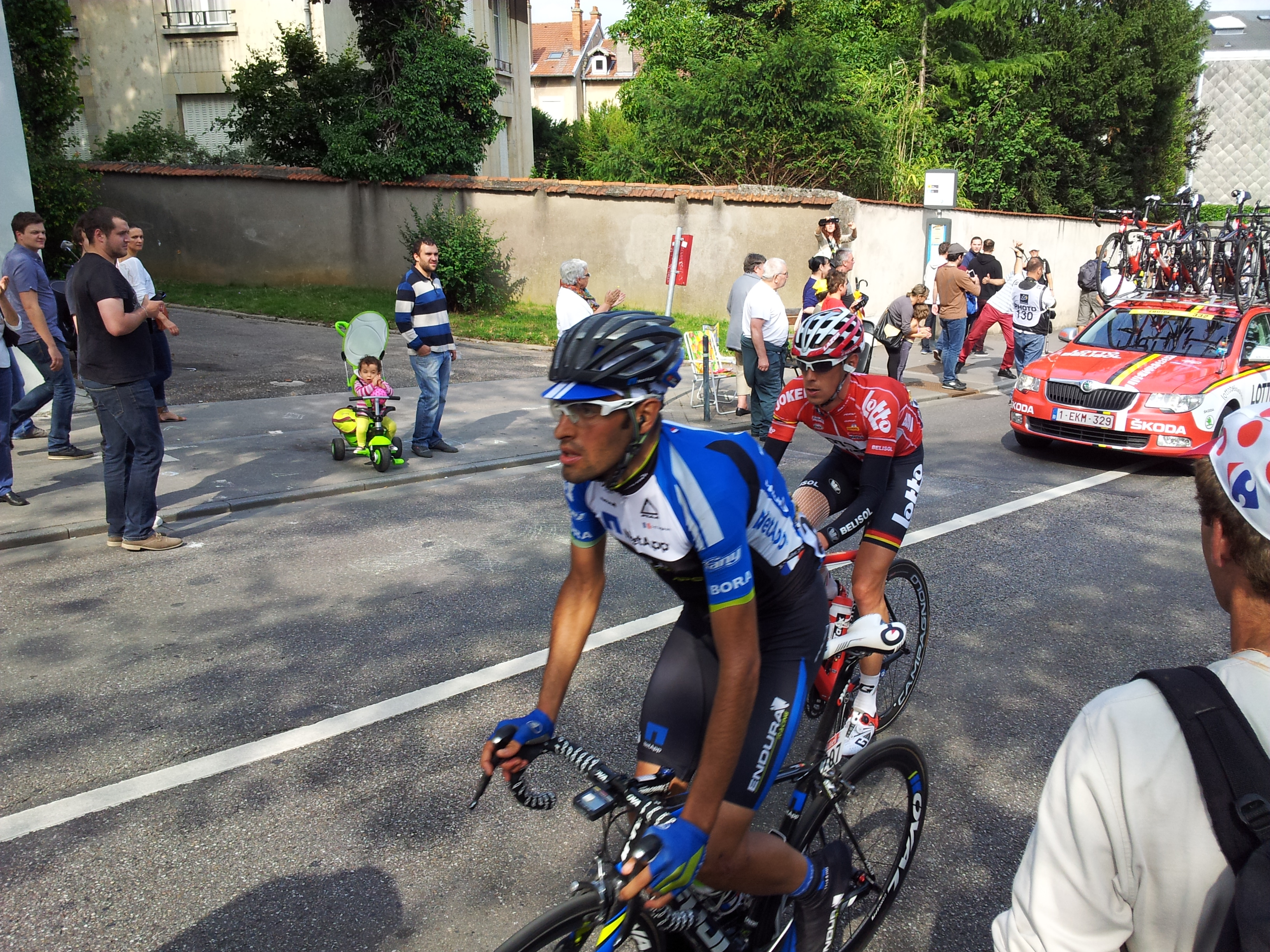
- Mendes (front) at the 2014 Tour de France

Personal information
- Full name: José João Pimenta Costa Mendes
- Born: 24 April 1985 (age 41) Guimarães, Portugal
- Height: 1.81 m (5 ft 11 in)
- Weight: 64 kg (141 lb; 10.1 st)

Cycling career
- Sport: Cycling
- Discipline: Road
- Role: Rider

Professional teams
- 2008: Benfica
- 2009: Liberty Seguros Continental
- 2010: LA Alumínios–Rota dos Móveis
- 2011: CCC–Polsat–Polkowice
- 2012: LA–Antarte
- 2013–2017: NetApp–Endura
- 2018: Burgos BH
- 2019: Sporting / Tavira
- 2020–2021: W52 / FC Porto
- 2022: Aviludo–Louletano–Loulé Concelho
- 2023–2024: NSJBI Victoria Sports Pro Cycling Team

Major wins
- One-day races and Classics National Road Race Championships (2016, 2019)

José João Pimenta Costa Mendes (born 24 April 1985) is a Portuguese former professional cyclist, who competed from 2008 to 2024 for ten different teams, including the cycling teams of the Portuguese Big Three clubs – Benfica, Sporting / Tavira and W52 / FC Porto.

He competed in six Grand Tours between 2013 and 2018, the road race at the 2016 Rio Olympics, and was a two-time winner at the Portuguese National Road Race Championships, in 2016 and 2019 – his only two professional victories.

== Major results ==
2003
1st Time trial, National Junior Road Championships
2005
2nd Time trial, National Under-23 Road Championships
2008
9th Overall Tour de Luxembourg
10th Overall Vuelta a Chihuahua
2009
3rd Time trial, National Road Championships
3rd Circuit de Lorraine
2010
1st Stage 3 Troféu Joaquim Agostinho
2012
6th Overall Troféu Joaquim Agostinho
2014
7th Vuelta a Murcia
2015
3rd Time trial, National Road Championships
5th Overall Critérium International
5th Overall Coppa Bernocchi
6th Overall Giro del Trentino

1st Stage 1 (TTT)

2016
National Road Championships

1st Road race
2nd Time trial

6th Overall Tour of Norway
7th Overall Tour of Slovenia
2017
4th Time trial, National Road Championships
2018
6th Overall Troféu Joaquim Agostinho
2019
1st Road race, National Road Championships
2023
5th Overall Aziz Shusha
6th Overall Tour of Małopolska
6th The Tour Oqtosh-Chorvoq-Mountain
7th Tour of Bostonliq II
8th Overall Tour of Azerbaijan (Iran)

=== Grand Tour general classification results timeline ===
Grand Tour	2013	2014	2015	2016	2017	2018
Giro d'Italia	—	—	—	—	48	—
Tour de France	—	124	140	—	—	—
Vuelta a España	22	—	—	54	—	83

Legend
—	Did not compete
DNF	Did not finish
