= Bruno Castanheira (cyclist) =

Portuguese cyclist

Personal information
- Born: 4 February 1977 Barreiro, Portugal
- Died: 14 September 2014 (aged 37) Torres Vedras, Portugal

Cycling career
- Sport: Cycling
- Discipline: Road
- Role: Rider

Amateur team
- 1990-1993: Paio Pires Futebol Clube

Professional teams
- 1999-2003: LA-Pecol
- 2004-2006: União Ciclista da Maia
- 2007-2008: Benfica
- 2009: Barbot-Siper

Bruno Miguel Castanheira Gomes (4 February 1977 – 14 September 2014) was a Portuguese cyclist.

Castanheira was born in Barreiro. He died on 14 September 2014 in Torres Vedras from a sudden illness.

== Palmares ==
1999
1st Circuito da Malveira
2000
1st Gran Premio Internacional Mitsubishi MR Cortez

1st stage 1

2002
3rd Volta ao Distrito de Santarém
2003
1st Volta Terras de Santa Maria
3rd National Time Trial Championship
2004
National Road Champion
2006
3rd Volta Terras de Santa Maria

1st stage 3

2nd National Time Trial Championship
2009
3rd Vuelta a Extremadura
