= 2022 Volta a Portugal =

2022 UCI Europe Tour

Race details
- Dates: 4 – 15 August 2022
- Stages: 10 + Prologue
- Distance: 1,559.9 km (969.3 mi)
- Winning time: 38h 38' 31"

Results
Jersey awarded to the overall winner	Winner	Mauricio Moreira (URU)	(Glassdrive–Q8–Anicolor)
	Second	Frederico Figueiredo (POR)	(Glassdrive–Q8–Anicolor)
	Third	António Carvalho (POR)	(Glassdrive–Q8–Anicolor)
Jersey awarded to the points classification winner	Points	Scott McGill (USA)	(Wildlife Generation Pro Cycling)
Jersey awarded to the mountains classification winner	Mountains	Frederico Figueiredo (POR)	(Glassdrive–Q8–Anicolor)
Jersey awarded to the young rider classification winner	Young rider	Jokin Murguialday (ESP)	(Caja Rural–Seguros RGA)
	Team	Glassdrive–Q8–Anicolor	

The 2022 Volta a Portugal (also known as the 2022 Volta a Portugal em Bicicleta Santander) was the 83rd edition of the Volta a Portugal road cycling stage race, which was held between August 4 to 15, 2022. It was rated as a 2.1 event in the 2022 UCI Europe Tour.

== Teams ==
Four UCI ProTeams and 15 UCI Continental teams constituted the 18 teams that participated in the race. Unlike the previous year, no UCI WorldTeams competed. 106 of the initial 126 riders finished.

UCI ProTeams

- Caja Rural–Seguros RGA
- Human Powered Health
- Burgos BH
- Euskaltel–Euskadi

UCI Continental Teams

- Wildlife Generation Pro Cycling
- Java Kiwi Atlántico
- Glassdrive–Q8–Anicolor
- Trinity Racing
- Efapel Cycling
- Tavfer–Mortágua–Ovos Matinados
- Kelly / Simoldes / UDO
- Electro Hiper Europa–Caldas
- Rádio Popular–Paredes–Boavista
- Atum General / Tavira / AP Maria Nova Hotel
- ABTF–Feirense
- Aviludo–Louletano–Loulé Concelho
- LA Alumínios / Credibom / Marcos Car
- BAI–Sicasal–Petro de Luanda

== Schedule ==
Stage characteristics and winners
Stage	Date	Course	Distance	Type	Winner
P	4 August	Lisbon	5.4 km (3.4 mi)	Individual time trial	Rafael Reis (POR)
1	5 August	Vila Franca de Xira to Elvas	193 km (120 mi)	Hilly stage	Scott McGill (USA)
2	6 August	Badajoz to Castelo Branco	181.5 km (112.8 mi)	Hilly stage	João Matias (POR)
3	7 August	Sertã to Covilhã (Torre)	159 km (99 mi)	Mountain stage	Mauricio Moreira (URU)
4	8 August	Guarda to Viseu	169.1 km (105.1 mi)	Hilly stage	João Matias (POR)
	9 August	Viseu		Rest day	
5	10 August	Mealhada to Miranda do Corvo	165.7 km (103.0 mi)	Mountain stage	Frederico Figueiredo (POR)
6	11 August	Águeda to Maia	159.9 km (99.4 mi)	Hilly stage	Scott McGill (USA)
7	12 August	Santo Tirso to Braga	150.1 km (93.3 mi)	Hilly stage	Luís Gomes (POR)
8	13 August	Viana do Castelo to Fafe	182.7 km (113.5 mi)	Hilly stage	Victor Langellotti (MON)
9	14 August	Paredes to Mondim de Basto (Santuário de Nossa Senhora da Graça)	174.5 km (108.4 mi)	Mountain stage	António Carvalho (POR)
10	15 August	Porto to Vila Nova de Gaia	18.6 km (11.6 mi)	Individual time trial	Mauricio Moreira (URU)
Total			1,568.6 km (974.7 mi)		

== Stages ==
=== Prologue ===
4 August 2022 — Lisbon, 5.4 km (3.4 mi) (ITT)

Prologue Result
Rank	Rider	Team	Time
1	Rafael Reis (POR)	Glassdrive–Q8–Anicolor	6' 11"
2	Mauricio Moreira (URU)	Glassdrive–Q8–Anicolor	+ 9"
3	Oliver Rees (GBR)	Trinity Racing	+ 9"
4	Joey Rosskopf (USA)	Human Powered Health	+ 11"
5	Tiago Antunes (POR)	Efapel Cycling	+ 12"
6	Henrique Casimiro (POR)	Efapel Cycling	+ 13"
7	Max Walker (GBR)	Trinity Racing	+ 13"
8	Juan José Lobato (ESP)	Euskaltel–Euskadi	+ 14"
8	Aleksandr Grigorev^{[a]}	Atum General / Tavira / AP Maria Nova Hotel	+ 14"
10	Txomin Juaristi (ESP)	Euskaltel–Euskadi	+ 14"

General classification after Prologue
Rank	Rider	Team	Time
1	Rafael Reis (POR)	Glassdrive–Q8–Anicolor	6' 11"
2	Mauricio Moreira (URU)	Glassdrive–Q8–Anicolor	+ 9"
3	Oliver Rees (GBR)	Trinity Racing	+ 9"
4	Joey Rosskopf (USA)	Human Powered Health	+ 11"
5	Tiago Antunes (POR)	Efapel Cycling	+ 12"
6	Henrique Casimiro (POR)	Efapel Cycling	+ 13"
7	Max Walker (GBR)	Trinity Racing	+ 13"
8	Juan José Lobato (ESP)	Euskaltel–Euskadi	+ 14"
8	Aleksandr Grigorev^{[a]}	Atum General / Tavira / AP Maria Nova Hotel	+ 14"
10	Txomin Juaristi (ESP)	Euskaltel–Euskadi	+ 14"

=== Stage 1 ===
5 August 2022 — Vila Franca de Xira to Elvas, 193.7 km (120.4 mi)

Stage 1 Result
Rank	Rider	Team	Time
1	Scott McGill (USA)	Wildlife Generation Pro Cycling	4h 30' 28"
2	Oliver Rees (GBR)	Trinity Racing	+ 0"
3	Mauricio Moreira (URU)	Glassdrive–Q8–Anicolor	+ 0"
4	João Matias (POR)	Tavfer–Mortágua–Ovos Matinados	+ 0"
5	Thomas Armstrong (GBR)	Electro Hiper Europa–Caldas	+ 0"
6	Joaquim Silva (POR)	Efapel Cycling	+ 0"
7	Juan Esteban Guerrero (COL)	Electro Hiper Europa–Caldas	+ 0"
8	César Martingil (POR)	Rádio Popular–Paredes–Boavista	+ 0"
9	Pablo Alonso (ESP)	Electro Hiper Europa–Caldas	+ 0"
10	António Barbio (POR)	Tavfer–Mortágua–Ovos Matinados	+ 0"

General classification after Stage 1
Rank	Rider	Team	Time
1	Rafael Reis (POR)	Glassdrive–Q8–Anicolor	4h 36' 39"
2	Mauricio Moreira (URU)	Glassdrive–Q8–Anicolor	+ 9"
3	Oliver Rees (GBR)	Trinity Racing	+ 9"
4	Joey Rosskopf (USA)	Human Powered Health	+ 11"
5	Tiago Antunes (POR)	Efapel Cycling	+ 12"
6	Henrique Casimiro (POR)	Efapel Cycling	+ 13"
7	Max Walker (GBR)	Trinity Racing	+ 13"
8	Juan José Lobato (ESP)	Euskaltel–Euskadi	+ 14"
8	Aleksandr Grigorev^{[a]}	Atum General / Tavira / AP Maria Nova Hotel	+ 14"
10	Txomin Juaristi (ESP)	Euskaltel–Euskadi	+ 14"

=== Stage 2 ===
6 August 2022 — Badajoz to Castelo Branco, 181.5 km (112.8 mi)

Stage 2 Result
Rank	Rider	Team	Time
1	João Matias (POR)	Tavfer–Mortágua–Ovos Matinados	4h 42' 21"
2	Scott McGill (USA)	Wildlife Generation Pro Cycling	+ 0"
3	Mauricio Moreira (URU)	Glassdrive–Q8–Anicolor	+ 0"
4	António Carvalho (POR)	Glassdrive–Q8–Anicolor	+ 0"
5	Luís Gomes (POR)	Kelly / Simoldes / UDO	+ 0"
6	Delio Fernández (ESP)	Atum General / Tavira / AP Maria Nova Hotel	+ 0"
7	Juan José Lobato (ESP)	Euskaltel–Euskadi	+ 0"
8	António Barbio (POR)	Tavfer–Mortágua–Ovos Matinados	+ 0"
9	Xavier Cañellas (ESP)	Euskaltel–Euskadi	+ 0"
10	Thomas Armstrong (GBR)	Electro Hiper Europa–Caldas	+ 0"

General classification after Stage 2
Rank	Rider	Team	Time
1	Rafael Reis (POR)	Glassdrive–Q8–Anicolor	9h 19' 00"
2	Mauricio Moreira (URU)	Glassdrive–Q8–Anicolor	+ 9"
3	Oliver Rees (GBR)	Trinity Racing	+ 9"
4	Joey Rosskopf (USA)	Human Powered Health	+ 11"
5	Tiago Antunes (POR)	Efapel Cycling	+ 12"
6	Henrique Casimiro (POR)	Efapel Cycling	+ 13"
7	Max Walker (GBR)	Trinity Racing	+ 13"
8	Juan José Lobato (ESP)	Euskaltel–Euskadi	+ 14"
8	Aleksandr Grigorev^{[a]}	Atum General / Tavira / AP Maria Nova Hotel	+ 14"
10	Txomin Juaristi (ESP)	Euskaltel–Euskadi	+ 14"

=== Stage 3 ===
7 August 2022 — Sertã to Covilhã (Torre), 159 km (99 mi)

Stage 3 Result
Rank	Rider	Team	Time
1	Mauricio Moreira (URU)	Glassdrive–Q8–Anicolor	4h 40' 35"
2	Luís Fernandes (POR)	Rádio Popular–Paredes–Boavista	+ 0"
3	Frederico Figueiredo (POR)	Glassdrive–Q8–Anicolor	+ 4"
4	André Cardoso (POR)	ABTF–Feirense	+ 1' 44"
5	Alejandro Marque (ESP)	Atum General / Tavira / AP Maria Nova Hotel	+ 1' 55"
6	António Carvalho (POR)	Glassdrive–Q8–Anicolor	+ 1' 59"
7	Delio Fernández (ESP)	Atum General / Tavira / AP Maria Nova Hotel	+ 2' 6"
8	Jokin Murguialday (ESP)	Caja Rural–Seguros RGA	+ 3' 18"
9	Emanuel Duarte (POR)	Atum General / Tavira / AP Maria Nova Hotel	+ 3' 24"
10	Jesús del Pino (ESP)	Aviludo–Louletano–Loulé Concelho	+ 4' 25"

General classification after Stage 3
Rank	Rider	Team	Time
1	Mauricio Moreira (URU)	Glassdrive–Q8–Anicolor	13h 59' 44"
2	Frederico Figueiredo (POR)	Glassdrive–Q8–Anicolor	+ 30"
3	Luís Fernandes (POR)	Rádio Popular–Paredes–Boavista	+ 31"
4	Alejandro Marque (ESP)	Atum General / Tavira / AP Maria Nova Hotel	+ 2' 10"
5	António Carvalho (POR)	Glassdrive–Q8–Anicolor	+ 2' 12"
6	André Cardoso (POR)	ABTF–Feirense	+ 2' 19"
7	Delio Fernández (ESP)	Atum General / Tavira / AP Maria Nova Hotel	+ 2' 33"
8	Emanuel Duarte (POR)	Atum General / Tavira / AP Maria Nova Hotel	+ 3' 32"
9	Jokin Murguialday (ESP)	Caja Rural–Seguros RGA	+ 3' 44"
10	Jesús del Pino (ESP)	Aviludo–Louletano–Loulé Concelho	+ 5' 3"

=== Stage 4 ===
8 August 2022 — Guarda to Viseu), 169.1 km (105.1 mi)

Stage 4 Result
Rank	Rider	Team	Time
1	João Matias (POR)	Tavfer–Mortágua–Ovos Matinados	3h 55' 11"
2	Scott McGill (USA)	Wildlife Generation Pro Cycling	+ 0"
3	Andoni López de Abetxuko (ESP)	Caja Rural–Seguros RGA	+ 0"
4	Alex Molenaar (NED)	Burgos BH	+ 0"
5	Thomas Armstrong (GBR)	Electro Hiper Europa–Caldas	+ 0"
6	Rafael Silva (POR)	Efapel Cycling	+ 0"
7	Fábio Costa (POR)	Glassdrive–Q8–Anicolor	+ 0"
8	Aleksandr Grigorev^{[a]}	Atum General / Tavira / AP Maria Nova Hotel	+ 0"
9	Tiago Antunes (POR)	Efapel Cycling	+ 0"
10	André Ramalho (POR)	LA Alumínios / Credibom / Marcos Car	+ 0"

General classification after Stage 4
Rank	Rider	Team	Time
1	Mauricio Moreira (URU)	Glassdrive–Q8–Anicolor	17h 45' 55"
2	Frederico Figueiredo (POR)	Glassdrive–Q8–Anicolor	+ 30"
3	Luís Fernandes (POR)	Rádio Popular–Paredes–Boavista	+ 31"
4	Alejandro Marque (ESP)	Atum General / Tavira / AP Maria Nova Hotel	+ 2' 10"
5	António Carvalho (POR)	Glassdrive–Q8–Anicolor	+ 2' 12"
6	André Cardoso (POR)	ABTF–Feirense	+ 2' 19"
7	Delio Fernández (ESP)	Atum General / Tavira / AP Maria Nova Hotel	+ 2' 33"
8	Emanuel Duarte (POR)	Atum General / Tavira / AP Maria Nova Hotel	+ 3' 32"
9	Jokin Murguialday (ESP)	Caja Rural–Seguros RGA	+ 3' 44"
10	Jesús del Pino (ESP)	Aviludo–Louletano–Loulé Concelho	+ 5' 3"

=== Stage 5 ===
10 August 2022 — Mealhada to Miranda do Corvo), 165.7 km (103.0 mi)

Stage 5 Result
Rank	Rider	Team	Time
1	Frederico Figueiredo (POR)	Glassdrive–Q8–Anicolor	+ 4h 2' 1"
2	Henrique Casimiro (POR)	Efapel Cycling	+ 37"
3	Luís Fernandes (POR)	Rádio Popular–Paredes–Boavista	+ 37"
4	Mauricio Moreira (URU)	Glassdrive–Q8–Anicolor	+ 37"
5	António Carvalho (POR)	Glassdrive–Q8–Anicolor	+ 39"
6	Barry Miller (USA)	BAI–Sicasal–Petro de Luanda	+ 39"
7	André Cardoso (POR)	ABTF–Feirense	+ 50"
8	Jesús del Pino (ESP)	Aviludo–Louletano–Loulé Concelho	+ 1' 11"
9	Gonçalo Leaça (POR)	LA Alumínios / Credibom / Marcos Car	+ 1' 42"
10	Yesid Pira (COL)	Caja Rural–Seguros RGA	+ 1' 48"

General classification after Stage 5
Rank	Rider	Team	Time
1	Frederico Figueiredo (POR)	Glassdrive–Q8–Anicolor	21h 57' 26"
2	Mauricio Moreira (URU)	Glassdrive–Q8–Anicolor	+ 7"
3	Luís Fernandes (POR)	Rádio Popular–Paredes–Boavista	+ 38"
4	António Carvalho (POR)	Glassdrive–Q8–Anicolor	+ 2' 21"
5	André Cardoso (POR)	ABTF–Feirense	+ 2' 39"
6	Alejandro Marque (ESP)	Atum General / Tavira / AP Maria Nova Hotel	+ 3' 33"
7	Delio Fernández (ESP)	Atum General / Tavira / AP Maria Nova Hotel	+ 4' 17"
8	Jesús del Pino (ESP)	Aviludo–Louletano–Loulé Concelho	+ 5' 44"
9	Jokin Murguialday (ESP)	Caja Rural–Seguros RGA	+ 5' 55"
10	Ángel Sánchez (ESP)	Tavfer–Mortágua–Ovos Matinados	+ 7' 05"

=== Stage 6 ===
11 August 2022 — Águeda to Maia), 159.9 km (99.4 mi)

Stage 6 Result
Rank	Rider	Team	Time
1	Scott McGill (USA)	Wildlife Generation Pro Cycling	3h 48' 18"
2	João Matias (POR)	Tavfer–Mortágua–Ovos Matinados	+ 0"
3	António Carvalho (POR)	Glassdrive–Q8–Anicolor	+ 0"
4	António Barbio (POR)	Tavfer–Mortágua–Ovos Matinados	+ 0"
5	Fábio Costa (POR)	Glassdrive–Q8–Anicolor	+ 0"
6	Oliver Rees (GBR)	Trinity Racing	+ 0"
7	Thomas Armstrong (GBR)	Electro Hiper Europa–Caldas	+ 0"
8	Juan Esteban Guerrero (COL)	Electro Hiper Europa–Caldas	+ 0"
9	César Martingil (POR)	Rádio Popular–Paredes–Boavista	+ 0"
10	Andoni López de Abetxuko (ESP)	Caja Rural–Seguros RGA	+ 0"

General classification after Stage 6
Rank	Rider	Team	Time
1	Frederico Figueiredo (POR)	Glassdrive–Q8–Anicolor	21h 57' 26"
2	Mauricio Moreira (URU)	Glassdrive–Q8–Anicolor	+ 7"
3	Luís Fernandes (POR)	Rádio Popular–Paredes–Boavista	+ 38"
4	António Carvalho (POR)	Glassdrive–Q8–Anicolor	+ 2' 21"
5	André Cardoso (POR)	ABTF–Feirense	+ 2' 39"
6	Alejandro Marque (ESP)	Atum General / Tavira / AP Maria Nova Hotel	+ 3' 33"
7	Delio Fernández (ESP)	Atum General / Tavira / AP Maria Nova Hotel	+ 4' 17"
8	Jesús del Pino (ESP)	Aviludo–Louletano–Loulé Concelho	+ 5' 44"
9	Jokin Murguialday (ESP)	Caja Rural–Seguros RGA	+ 5' 55"
10	Ángel Sánchez (ESP)	Tavfer–Mortágua–Ovos Matinados	+ 7' 05"

=== Stage 7 ===
12 August 2022 — Santo Tirso to Braga), 150.1 km (93.3 mi)

Stage 7 Result
Rank	Rider	Team	Time
1	Luís Gomes (POR)	Kelly / Simoldes / UDO	3h 32' 3"
2	Gonçalo Leaça (POR)	LA Alumínios / Credibom / Marcos Car	+ 0"
3	Txomin Juaristi (ESP)	Euskaltel–Euskadi	+ 0"
4	Calum Johnston (GBR)	Caja Rural–Seguros RGA	+ 0"
5	Joaquim Silva (POR)	Efapel Cycling	+ 0"
6	Joey Rosskopf (USA)	Human Powered Health	+ 0"
7	Asier Exteberria (ESP)	Euskaltel–Euskadi	+ 1' 27"
8	João Matias (POR)	Tavfer–Mortágua–Ovos Matinados	+ 1' 28"
9	César Martingil (POR)	Rádio Popular–Paredes–Boavista	+ 1' 28"
10	Juan Antonio López-Cózar (ESP)	Burgos BH	+ 1' 28"

General classification after Stage 7
Rank	Rider	Team	Time
1	Frederico Figueiredo (POR)	Glassdrive–Q8–Anicolor	29h 19' 34"
2	Mauricio Moreira (URU)	Glassdrive–Q8–Anicolor	+ 7"
3	Luís Fernandes (POR)	Rádio Popular–Paredes–Boavista	+ 38"
4	António Carvalho (POR)	Glassdrive–Q8–Anicolor	+ 2' 21"
5	André Cardoso (POR)	ABTF–Feirense	+ 2' 39"
6	Alejandro Marque (ESP)	Atum General / Tavira / AP Maria Nova Hotel	+ 3' 33"
7	Delio Fernández (ESP)	Atum General / Tavira / AP Maria Nova Hotel	+ 4' 17"
8	Jesús del Pino (ESP)	Aviludo–Louletano–Loulé Concelho	+ 5' 44"
9	Jokin Murguialday (ESP)	Caja Rural–Seguros RGA	+ 5' 55"
10	Ángel Sánchez (ESP)	Tavfer–Mortágua–Ovos Matinados	+ 7' 05"

=== Stage 8 ===
13 August 2022 — Viana do Castelo to Fafe), 182.4 km (113.3 mi)

Stage 8 Result
Rank	Rider	Team	Time
1	Victor Langellotti (MON)	Burgos BH	4h 11' 29"
2	Mauricio Moreira (URU)	Glassdrive–Q8–Anicolor	+ 0"
3	Scott McGill (USA)	Wildlife Generation Pro Cycling	+ 0"
4	António Carvalho (POR)	Glassdrive–Q8–Anicolor	+ 0"
5	Delio Fernández (ESP)	Atum General / Tavira / AP Maria Nova Hotel	+ 0"
6	Frederico Figueiredo (POR)	Glassdrive–Q8–Anicolor	+ 0"
7	Henrique Casimiro (POR)	Efapel Cycling	+ 0"
8	Joey Rosskopf (USA)	Human Powered Health	+ 0"
9	Hugo Nunes (POR)	Rádio Popular–Paredes–Boavista	+ 0"
10	Thomas Armstrong (GBR)	Electro Hiper Europa–Caldas	+ 0"

General classification after Stage 8
Rank	Rider	Team	Time
1	Frederico Figueiredo (POR)	Glassdrive–Q8–Anicolor	29h 19' 34"
2	Mauricio Moreira (URU)	Glassdrive–Q8–Anicolor	+ 7"
3	Luís Fernandes (POR)	Rádio Popular–Paredes–Boavista	+ 38"
4	António Carvalho (POR)	Glassdrive–Q8–Anicolor	+ 2' 21"
5	André Cardoso (POR)	ABTF–Feirense	+ 2' 39"
6	Alejandro Marque (ESP)	Atum General / Tavira / AP Maria Nova Hotel	+ 3' 33"
7	Delio Fernández (ESP)	Atum General / Tavira / AP Maria Nova Hotel	+ 4' 17"
8	Jesús del Pino (ESP)	Aviludo–Louletano–Loulé Concelho	+ 5' 44"
9	Jokin Murguialday (ESP)	Caja Rural–Seguros RGA	+ 5' 55"
10	Ángel Sánchez (ESP)	Tavfer–Mortágua–Ovos Matinados	+ 7' 05"

=== Stage 9 ===
14 August 2022 — Paredes to Mondim de Basto (Santuário de Nossa Senhora da Graça), 174.5 km (108.4 mi)

Stage 9 Result
Rank	Rider	Team	Time
1	António Carvalho (POR)	Glassdrive–Q8–Anicolor	4h 42' 14"
2	Frederico Figueiredo (POR)	Glassdrive–Q8–Anicolor	+ 0"
3	Mauricio Moreira (URU)	Glassdrive–Q8–Anicolor	+ 7"
4	Alejandro Marque (ESP)	Atum General / Tavira / AP Maria Nova Hotel	+ 46"
5	Jesús del Pino (ESP)	Aviludo–Louletano–Loulé Concelho	+ 57"
6	André Cardoso (POR)	ABTF–Feirense	+ 1'
7	Delio Fernández (ESP)	Atum General / Tavira / AP Maria Nova Hotel	+ 1' 2"
8	Luís Fernandes (POR)	Rádio Popular–Paredes–Boavista	+ 1' 14"
9	Barry Miller (USA)	BAI–Sicasal–Petro de Luanda	+ 1' 20"
10	Jokin Murguialday (ESP)	Caja Rural–Seguros RGA	+ 1' 28"

General classification after Stage 9
Rank	Rider	Team	Time
1	Frederico Figueiredo (POR)	Glassdrive–Q8–Anicolor	29h 19' 34"
2	Mauricio Moreira (URU)	Glassdrive–Q8–Anicolor	+ 7"
3	Luís Fernandes (POR)	Rádio Popular–Paredes–Boavista	+ 1' 52"
4	António Carvalho (POR)	Glassdrive–Q8–Anicolor	+ 2' 21"
5	Alejandro Marque (ESP)	Atum General / Tavira / AP Maria Nova Hotel	+ 4' 19"
6	André Cardoso (POR)	ABTF–Feirense	+ 4' 29"
7	Delio Fernández (ESP)	Atum General / Tavira / AP Maria Nova Hotel	+ 5' 19"
8	Jesús del Pino (ESP)	Aviludo–Louletano–Loulé Concelho	+ 6' 41"
9	Jokin Murguialday (ESP)	Caja Rural–Seguros RGA	+ 7' 23"
10	Henrique Casimiro (POR)	Efapel Cycling	+ 9' 15"

=== Stage 10 ===
15 August 2022 — Porto to Vila Nova de Gaia, 18.6 km (11.6 mi) (ITT)

Stage 10 Result
Rank	Rider	Team	Time
1	Mauricio Moreira (URU)	Glassdrive–Q8–Anicolor	25' 7"
2	António Carvalho (POR)	Glassdrive–Q8–Anicolor	+ 21"
3	Alejandro Marque (ESP)	Atum General / Tavira / AP Maria Nova Hotel	+ 1' 5"
4	Txomin Juaristi (ESP)	Euskaltel–Euskadi	+ 1' 8"
5	Asier Exteberria (ESP)	Euskaltel–Euskadi	+ 1' 13"
6	Rafael Reis (POR)	Glassdrive–Q8–Anicolor	+ 1' 15"
7	Frederico Figueiredo (POR)	Glassdrive–Q8–Anicolor	+ 1' 16"
8	Vicente García de Mateos (ESP)	Aviludo–Louletano–Loulé Concelho	+ 1' 16"
8	Oliver Rees (GBR)	Trinity Racing	+ 1' 20"
10	Xabier Isasa (ESP)	Euskaltel–Euskadi	+ 1' 23"

General classification after Stage 10
Rank	Rider	Team	Time
1	Mauricio Moreira (URU)	Glassdrive–Q8–Anicolor	38h 38' 31"
2	Frederico Figueiredo (POR)	Glassdrive–Q8–Anicolor	+ 1' 9"
3	António Carvalho (POR)	Glassdrive–Q8–Anicolor	+ 2' 35"
4	Luís Fernandes (POR)	Rádio Popular–Paredes–Boavista	+ 3' 44"
5	Alejandro Marque (ESP)	Atum General / Tavira / AP Maria Nova Hotel	+ 5' 17"
6	Delio Fernández (ESP)	Atum General / Tavira / AP Maria Nova Hotel	+ 6' 54"
7	André Cardoso (POR)	ABTF–Feirense	+ 7' 31"
8	Jesús del Pino (ESP)	Aviludo–Louletano–Loulé Concelho	+ 9' 24"
9	Jokin Murguialday (ESP)	Caja Rural–Seguros RGA	+ 9' 24"
10	Txomin Juaristi (ESP)	Euskaltel–Euskadi	+ 10' 28"

== Classification leadership table ==
Classification leadership by stage
Stage	Winner	General classification	Points classification	Mountains classification	Young rider classification
P	Rafael Reis	Rafael Reis	not awarded	not awarded	Oliver Rees
1	Scott McGill	Rafael Reis	Scott McGill	Hugo Nunes	Oliver Rees
2	João Matias	Rafael Reis	Scott McGill	Edwin Torres	Oliver Rees
3	Mauricio Moreira	Mauricio Moreira	Scott McGill	Mauricio Moreira	Jokin Murguialday
4	João Matias	Mauricio Moreira	João Matias	Mauricio Moreira	Jokin Murguialday
5	Frederico Figueiredo	Frederico Figueiredo	João Matias	Mauricio Moreira	Jokin Murguialday
6	Scott McGill	Frederico Figueiredo	Scott McGill	Mauricio Moreira	Jokin Murguialday
7	Luís Gomes	Frederico Figueiredo	Scott McGill	Mauricio Moreira	Jokin Murguialday
8	Victor Langellotti	Frederico Figueiredo	Scott McGill	Mauricio Moreira	Jokin Murguialday
9	António Carvalho	Frederico Figueiredo	Scott McGill	Frederico Figueiredo	Jokin Murguialday
10	Mauricio Moreira	Mauricio Moreira	Scott McGill	Frederico Figueiredo	Jokin Murguialday
Final		Mauricio Moreira	Scott McGill	Frederico Figueiredo	Jokin Murguialday

== Notes ==
^{a} As of 1 March 2022, the UCI announced that cyclists from Russia and Belarus would no longer compete under the name or flag of those respective countries due to the Russian invasion of Ukraine.
