= Cycling at the 2018 Mediterranean Games – Men's individual road race =

Men's cycling road race at the 2018 Mediterranean Games
- Venue: Vila-seca Urban Circuit; 143 km (88.9 mi)
- Date: 27 June
- Competitors: 66 from 14 nations
- Winning time: 3:43:50

Medalists
gold medal	Jalel Duranti	Italy
silver medal	Filippo Tagliani	Italy
bronze medal	Rafael Silva	Portugal

The men's road race was one of 4 cycling events of the 2018 Mediterranean Games in Tarragona. The race started and finished on 27 June at the Vila-seca Urban Circuit and was won by Jalel Duranti of Italy.

== Start list ==
The following NOCs had entered riders to compete in the road race event.

NOC	Number	Athletes
Albania	3	Xhuliano Kamberaj; Ridion Kopshti; Ylber Sefa
Algeria	8	Abderahman Mansouri; Youcef Reguigui; Abderaouf Bengayou; Oussama Mansouri; Abderrahmane Mehdi Hamza; Islam Mansouri; Yacine Hamza; Ismail Mdjahed
Andorra	3	Marc Gasa; Samuel Ponce; Òscar Cabanas
Croatia	1	David Jabuka
Cyprus	2	Andreas Miltiadis; Alexandros Agrotis
Greece	5	Polychronis Tzortzakis; Charalampos Kastrantas; Stylianos Farantakis; Georgios Bouglas; Ioannis Kyriakidis
Italy	8	Filippo Tagliani; Alessandro Covi; Matteo Sobrero; Cristian Scaroni; Samuele Battistella; Francesco Romano; Jalel Duranti; Andrea Toniatti

NOC	Number	Athletes
Portugal	8	André Carvalho; Domingos Gonçalves; Frederico Figueiredo; Joni Brandão; Rafael Silva; Tiago Antunes; Francisco Campos; João Rodrigues
Slovenia	6	Žiga Jerman; Gašper Katrašnik; Rok Korošec; Izidor Penko; Tadej Pogačar; Jaka Primožič
San Marino	1	Federico Olei
Serbia	3	Dušan Kalaba; Dušan Rajović; Veljko Stojnić
Spain	8	Manuel Peñalver; Iñigo Elosegui; Antonio Gómez; Mario Gonzalez; Óscar Pelegri; Juan Ignacio Perez; Álvaro Trueba; Óscar Hernández
Syria	2	Ahmad Badreddin Wais; Mohammed Fadwan Nwiser
Turkey	8	Onur Balkan; Batuhan Özgür; Muhammed Atalay; Mustafa Köklü; Yunus Yılmaz; Oğuzhan Tiryaki; Ahmet Örken; Feritcan Şamlı

== Results ==
In the table below, "s.t." indicates that the rider crossed the finish line in the same group as the cyclist before him, and was therefore credited with the same finishing time. Under UCI regulations for one-day road races (article 2.3.039), "Any rider finishing in a time exceeding that of the winner by more than 8% shall not be placed".

Final results
Rank	Rider	Time
1st place, gold medalist(s)	Jalel Duranti (ITA)	3h 43' 50"
2nd place, silver medalist(s)	Filippo Tagliani (ITA)	s.t.
3rd place, bronze medalist(s)	Rafael Silva (POR)	s.t.
4	Rok Korošec (SLO)	s.t.
5	Mario Gonzalez (ESP)	s.t.
6	Joni Brandão (POR)	s.t.
7	João Rodrigues (POR)	s.t.
8	Alexandros Agrotis (CYP)	s.t.
9	Frederico Figueiredo (POR)	s.t.
10	Domingos Gonçalves (POR)	s.t.
11	Álvaro Trueba (ESP)	+ 04"
12	Iñigo Elosegui (ESP)	s.t.
13	Gašper Katrašnik (SLO)	+ 07"
14	Andreas Miltiadis (CYP)	+ 09"
15	Tadej Pogačar (SLO)	s.t.
16	Andrea Toniatti (ITA)	+ 21"
17	Cristian Scaroni (ITA)	+ 29"
18	André Carvalho (POR)	+ 37"
19	Tiago Antunes (POR)	+ 47"
20	Veljko Stojnić (SRB)	+ 1' 06"
21	Ylber Sefa (ALB)	+ 7' 32"
22	Muhammed Atalay (TUR)	s.t.
23	Onur Balkan (TUR)	+ 7' 33"
24	Antonio Gómez (ESP)	+ 7' 34"
25	Jaka Primožič (SLO)	s.t.
26	Samuele Battistella (ITA)	s.t.
27	Matteo Sobrero (ITA)	s.t.
28	Juan Ignacio Perez (ESP)	+ 13' 43"
29	David Jabuka (CRO)	s.t.
30	Óscar Hernández (ESP)	+ 13' 46"
31	Batuhan Özgür (TUR)	s.t.
32	Óscar Pelegri (ESP)	s.t.
33	Francesco Romano (ITA)	s.t.
Over time limit
–	Youcef Reguigui (ALG)	+ 19' 23"
–	Georgios Bouglas (GRE)	s.t.
–	Yacine Hamza (ALG)	s.t.
–	Òscar Cabanas (AND)	s.t.
–	Federico Olei (SMR)	s.t.
–	Samuel Ponce (AND)	s.t.
–	Ahmet Örken (TUR)	+ 19' 26"
–	Charalampos Kastrantas (GRE)	s.t.
–	Alessandro Covi (ITA)	s.t.
–	Ridion Kopshti (ALB)	s.t.
–	Yunus Yılmaz (TUR)	s.t.
–	Francisco Campos (POR)	s.t.
–	Abderrahmane Mehdi Hamza (ALG)	+ 19' 28"
–	Ahmad Badreddin Wais (SYR)	+ 23' 23"
–	Oğuzhan Tiryaki (TUR)	+ 25' 03"
–	Ioannis Kyriakidis (GRE)	+ 31' 05"

Abandoned during the stage
–	Marc Gasa (AND)	ABN
–	Mohammed Fadwan Nwiser (SYR)	ABN
–	Dušan Kalaba (SRB)	ABN
–	Dušan Rajović (SRB)	ABN
–	Manuel Peñalver (ESP)	ABN
–	Polychronis Tzortzakis (GRE)	ABN
–	Stylianos Farantakis (GRE)	ABN
–	Mustafa Köklü (TUR)	ABN
–	Abderahman Mansouri (ALG)	ABN
–	Abderaouf Bengayou (ALG)	ABN
–	Oussama Mansouri (ALG)	ABN
–	Islam Mansouri (ALG)	ABN
–	Ismail Mdjahed (ALG)	ABN
–	Xhuliano Kamberaj (ALB)	ABN
–	Žiga Jerman (SLO)	ABN
–	Izidor Penko (SLO)	ABN
–	Feritcan Şamlı (TUR)	ABN
