= Grande Prémio Anicolor =

Race details
- Date: May
- Region: Portugal
- Discipline: Road race
- Competition: UCI Europe Tour
- Type: Stage race
- Web site: gpanicolor.pt

History
- First edition: 2015
- Editions: 10 (as of 2026)
- First winner: Pedro Paulinho (POR)
- Most wins: Francisco Campos (POR); Alexis Guérin (FRA); (2 wins)
- Most recent: Alexis Guérin (FRA)

The Grande Prémio Anicolor is a professional cycling race held annually in Portugal. It is part of the UCI Europe Tour as a category 2.1 event. Prior to 2026, the race was part of the Portuguese national calendar. Until 2023, it was held as a one-day race.

== Winners ==
Year	Winner	Second	Third
2015	(Portugal) Pedro Paulinho	(Portugal) Manuel Cardoso	(Spain) Vicente García de Mateos
2016	(Portugal) César Fonte	(Portugal) Bruno Sancho	(Spain) Daniel López
2017	No race		
2018	(Portugal) Luís Gomes	(Portugal) Frederico Figueiredo	(Russia) Aleksandr Grigorev
2019	(Portugal) Francisco Campos	(Portugal) Luís Gomes	(Portugal) Henrique Casimiro
2020	No race		
2021	(Portugal) Francisco Campos	(Portugal) Rafael Silva	(Portugal) Tiago Antunes
2022	(Uruguay) Mauricio Moreira	(Portugal) António Barbio	(Portugal) Tiago Leal
2023	(Portugal) Luís Mendonça	(Portugal) Rafael Silva	(Portugal) Luís Gomes
2024	(Denmark) Julius Johansen	(Uruguay) Mauricio Moreira	(Portugal) Rafael Reis
2025	(France) Alexis Guérin	(Spain) Jesús del Pino	(Spain) Raúl Rota
2026	(France) Alexis Guérin	(Colombia) Javier Jamaica	(Portugal) Tiago Antunes
