= 2017 Vuelta a Castilla y León =

Race details
- Dates: 19–21 May 2017
- Stages: 3
- Distance: 479.9 km (298.2 mi)
- Winning time: 11h 48' 28"

Results
Jersey awarded to the overall winner	Winner	Jonathan Hivert (FRA)	(Direct Énergie)
	Second	Jaime Rosón (ESP)	(Caja Rural–Seguros RGA)
	Third	Henrique Casimiro (POR)	(Efapel)
Jersey awarded to the points classification winner	Points	Jonathan Hivert (FRA)	(Direct Énergie)
Jersey awarded to the mountains classification winner	Mountains	João Rodrigues (POR)	(W52 / FC Porto / Mestre da Cor)
Jersey awarded to the sprints classification winner	Sprints	Daniel Mestre (POR)	(Efapel)
	Team	(Italy) Androni-Sidermec-Bottecchia	

The 2017 Vuelta a Castilla y León was the 32nd edition of the Vuelta a Castilla y León cycle race and was held on 19 May to 21 May 2017. The race started in Aguilar de Campoo and finished in León. The race was won by Jonathan Hivert.

== General classification ==
Final general classification

Rank	Rider	Time
1	Jonathan Hivert (FRA)	11h 48' 28"
2	Jaime Rosón (ESP)	+ 38"
3	Henrique Casimiro (POR)	+ 55"
4	Richard Carapaz (ECU)	+ 1' 04"
5	Frederico Figueiredo (POR)	+ 1' 08"
6	Óscar Sevilla (ESP)	+ 1' 09"
7	António Carvalho (POR)	+ 1' 14"
8	Joaquim Silva (POR)	+ 1' 19"
9	Jesús del Pino (ESP)	+ 1' 28"
10	Rodolfo Torres (COL)	+ 1' 30"
