= 2021 Movistar Team (men's team) season =

Cycling team season

Movistar Team
- 2021 season
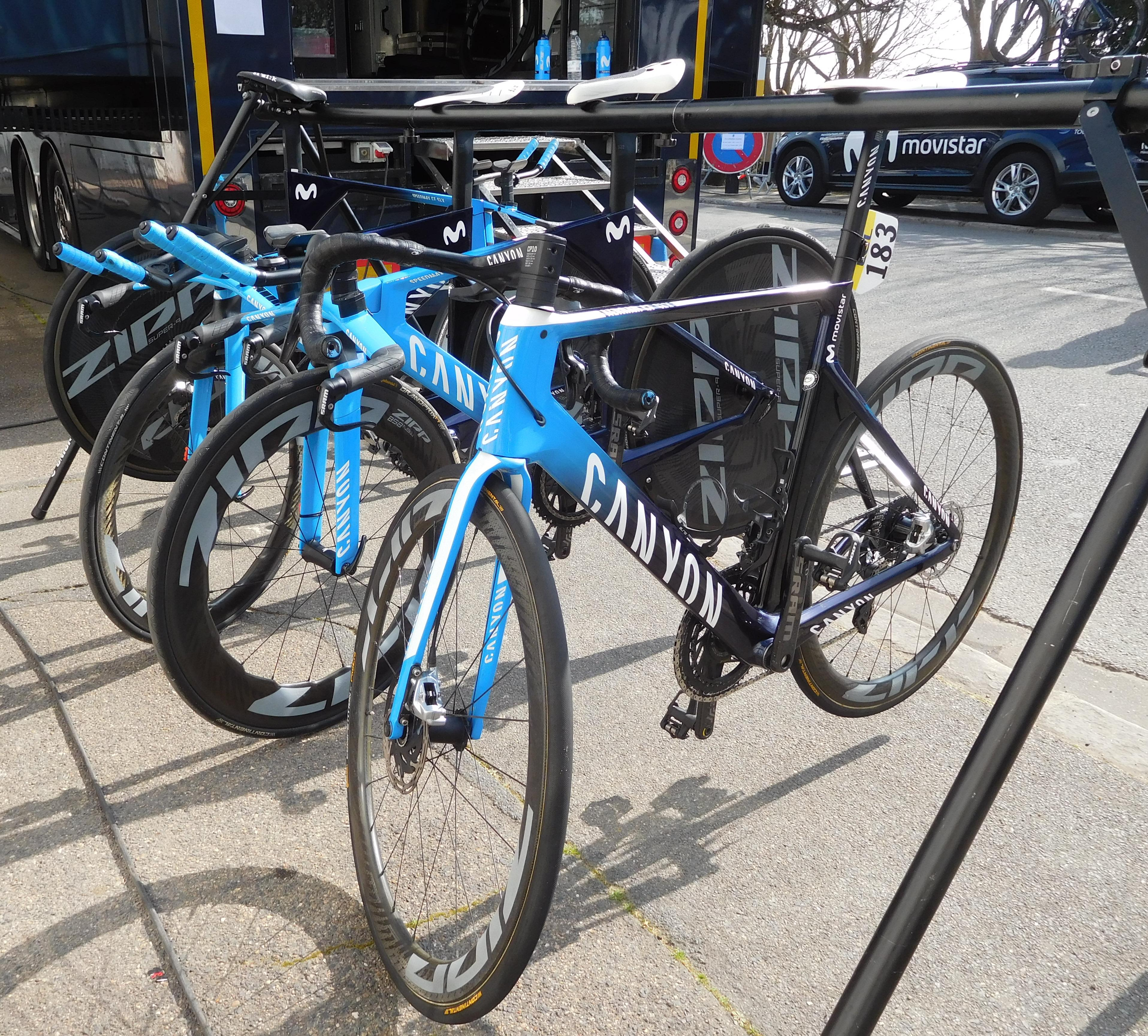
- Movistar Canyon bicycles at Paris–Nice
- UCI code: MOV
- Status: UCI WorldTeam
- World Tour Rank: 11th
- Manager: Eusebio Unzué (ESP)
- Main sponsor(s): Telefónica
- Based: Spain
- Bicycles: Canyon
- Groupset: SRAM

Season victories
- One-day races: 2
- Stage race overall: 2
- Stage race stages: 9
- National Championships: 2
- Most wins: Miguel Ángel López (COL) (4)
- Best ranked rider: Alejandro Valverde (ESP) (11th)
- Jersey

The 2021 season for Movistar Team was the 42nd season in the team's existence and the 11th season under the current name. The team has been a UCI WorldTeam since 2005, when the tier was first established.

== Team roster ==
As of 7 December 2021.

Rider	Date of birth
Juan Diego Alba (COL)	11 September 1997 (aged 23)
Jorge Arcas (ESP)	8 July 1992 (aged 28)
Héctor Carretero (ESP)	28 May 1995 (aged 25)
Dario Cataldo (ITA)	17 March 1985 (aged 35)
Gabriel Cullaigh (GBR)	8 April 1996 (aged 24)
Iñigo Elosegui (ESP)	6 March 1998 (aged 22)
Imanol Erviti (ESP)	15 November 1983 (aged 37)
Iván García Cortina (ESP)	20 November 1995 (aged 25)
Abner González (PUR)	9 October 2000 (aged 20)
Juri Hollmann (GER)	30 August 1999 (aged 21)
Johan Jacobs (SUI)	1 March 1997 (aged 23)
Matteo Jorgenson (USA)	1 July 1999 (aged 21)
Miguel Ángel López (Note: López and Movistar Team mutually agreed to terminate his contract on 1 October after his sudden abandon on the penultimate stage of the Vuelta a España earlier that month.) (COL)	4 February 1994 (aged 26)
Enric Mas (ESP)	7 January 1995 (aged 25)
Lluís Mas (ESP)	15 October 1989 (aged 31)

Rider	Date of birth
Sebastián Mora (ESP)	19 February 1988 (aged 32)
Gregor Mühlberger (AUT)	4 April 1994 (aged 26)
Mathias Norsgaard (DEN)	5 May 1997 (aged 23)
Nelson Oliveira (POR)	6 March 1989 (aged 31)
Antonio Pedrero (ESP)	23 October 1991 (aged 29)
José Joaquín Rojas (ESP)	8 June 1985 (aged 35)
Einer Rubio (COL)	22 February 1998 (aged 22)
Sergio Samitier (ESP)	31 August 1995 (aged 25)
Gonzalo Serrano (ESP)	17 August 1994 (aged 26)
Marc Soler (ESP)	22 November 1993 (aged 27)
Albert Torres (ESP)	26 April 1990 (aged 30)
Alejandro Valverde (ESP)	25 April 1980 (aged 40)
Carlos Verona (ESP)	4 November 1992 (aged 28)
Davide Villella (ITA)	27 June 1991 (aged 29)

Riders who joined the team for the 2021 season

Rider	2020 team
Iván García Cortina	Bahrain–McLaren
Abner González	neo-pro (Telcom–On Clima–Osés Const)
Miguel Ángel López	Astana
Gregor Mühlberger	Bora–Hansgrohe
Gonzalo Serrano	Caja Rural–Seguros RGA

Riders who left the team during or after the 2020 season

Rider	2021 team
Carlos Betancur	Colombia Tierra de Atletas–GW Bicicletas
Eduard Prades	Delko
Jürgen Roelandts	Retired
Eduardo Sepúlveda	Androni Giocattoli–Sidermec

== Season victories ==
Date	Race	Competition	Rider	Country	Location	Ref.
3 April	GP Miguel Induráin	UCI Europe Tour; UCI ProSeries	Alejandro Valverde (ESP)	Spain	Estella	
16 April	Volta a la Comunitat Valenciana, Stage 3	UCI Europe Tour; UCI ProSeries	Enric Mas (ESP)	Spain	Dos Aguas (Alto de la Reina)	
18 April	Volta a la Comunitat Valenciana, Team classification	UCI Europe Tour; UCI ProSeries	(Note: The riders in the squad were Juan Diego Alba, Imanol Erviti, Abner González, Enric Mas, Sebastián Mora, Nelson Oliveira, and José Joaquín Rojas.)	Spain		
30 April	Tour de Romandie, Stage 3	UCI World Tour	Marc Soler (ESP)	Switzerland	Estavayer	
1 May	Vuelta Asturias, Stage 2	UCI Europe Tour	Héctor Carretero (ESP)	Spain	Cangas del Narcea	
2 May	Vuelta Asturias, Team classification	UCI Europe Tour	(Note: The riders in the squad were Juan Diego Alba, Héctor Carretero, Abner González, Nelson Oliveira, Antonio Pedrero, José Joaquín Rojas, and Einer Rubio.)	Spain		
18 May	Vuelta a Andalucía, Stage 1	UCI Europe Tour; UCI ProSeries	Gonzalo Serrano (ESP)	Spain	Zahara de la Sierra	
20 May	Vuelta a Andalucía, Stage 3	UCI Europe Tour; UCI ProSeries	Miguel Ángel López (COL)	Spain	Villarrodrigo	
22 May	Vuelta a Andalucía, Overall	UCI Europe Tour; UCI ProSeries	Miguel Ángel López (COL)	Spain		
22 May	Vuelta a Andalucía, Team classification	UCI Europe Tour; UCI ProSeries	(Note: The riders in the squad were Héctor Carretero, Abner González, Juri Hollmann, Miguel Ángel López, Sebastián Mora, José Joaquín Rojas, and Gonzalo Serrano.)	Spain		
4 June	Critérium du Dauphiné, Stage 6	UCI World Tour	Alejandro Valverde (ESP)	France	Le Sappey-en-Chartreuse	
8 June	Mont Ventoux Dénivelé Challenge	UCI Europe Tour	Miguel Ángel López (COL)	France	Mont Ventoux	
12 June	Route d'Occitanie, Stage 3	UCI Europe Tour	Antonio Pedrero (ESP)	France	Le Mourtis	
13 June	Route d'Occitanie, Overall	UCI Europe Tour	Antonio Pedrero (ESP)	France		
7 August	Vuelta a Burgos, Young rider classification	UCI Europe Tour; UCI ProSeries	Einer Rubio (COL)	Spain		
15 August	Volta a Portugal, Young rider classification	UCI Europe Tour	Abner González (PUR)	Portugal		
2 September	Vuelta a España, Stage 18	UCI World Tour	Miguel Ángel López (COL)	Spain	Altu d'El Gamoniteiru	
30 September	Giro di Sicilia, Stage 3	UCI Europe Tour	Alejandro Valverde (ESP)	Italy	Caronia	

== National, Continental, and World Champions ==
Date	Discipline	Jersey	Rider	Country	Location	Ref.
26 June	Puerto Rico National Time Trial Championships		Abner González (PUR)	Puerto Rico	Arecibo	
27 June	Puerto Rico National Road Race Championships		Abner González (PUR)	Puerto Rico	Ciales	
