= 2021 Volta a Portugal =

2021 UCI Europe Tour

Race details
- Dates: 4 – 15 August 2021
- Stages: 10 + Prologue
- Distance: 1,568.6 km (974.7 mi)
- Winning time: 39h 39' 33"

Results
Jersey awarded to the overall winner	Winner	~~Amaro Antunes~~ (doping) (POR)	(W52 / FC Porto)
	Second	Mauricio Moreira (URU)	(Efapel)
	Third	Alejandro Marque (ESP)	(Atum General / Tavira / Maria Nova Hotel)
Jersey awarded to the points classification winner	Points	Rafael Reis (POR)	(Efapel)
Jersey awarded to the mountains classification winner	Mountains	Bruno Silva (POR)	(Antarte–Feirense)
Jersey awarded to the young rider classification winner	Young rider	Abner González (PUR)	(Movistar Team)
	Combination	Mauricio Moreira (URU)	(Efapel)
	Team	Efapel	

The 2021 Volta a Portugal (known as the 2021 Volta a Portugal em Bicicleta Santander for sponsorship reasons) was the 82nd edition of the Volta a Portugal road cycling stage race (not counting 2020 Volta a Portugal Edição Especial), which was held from 4 to 15 August 2021. It was a 2.1 event on the 2021 UCI Europe Tour calendar.

== Summary ==
Before the beginning of stage 3, Caja Rural–Seguros RGA retired from the race due to COVID-19 positive tests among their riders. Before the beginning of stage 5 another team, Euskaltel–Euskadi retired due to same reason, and also two riders from Rádio Popular–Boavista and another two from Tavfer–Measindot–Mortágua In the end of that same stage, Rádio Popular–Boavista reached the top of individual general classification with Daniel Freitas. However, in the following morning another positive test to COVID-19 to one of its riders, dictated the withdraw from the race for the team, with Alejandro Marque wearing again the yellow jersey.

== Teams ==
One UCI WorldTeam, six UCI ProTeams, and eleven UCI Continental teams made up the eighteen teams that participated in the race. Each team entered a squad of seven riders, for a total of 126 riders who started the race. 88 riders finished.

UCI WorldTeams

- Movistar Team

UCI ProTeams

- Bingoal Pauwels Sauces WB
- Burgos BH
- Caja Rural–Seguros RGA
- Equipo Kern Pharma
- Euskaltel–Euskadi
- Rally Cycling

UCI Continental Teams

- Antarte–Feirense
- Atum General / Tavira / Maria Nova Hotel
- Efapel
- Israel Cycling Academy
- Kelly / Simoldes / UDO
- LA Alumínios / LA Sport
- Louletano–Loulé Concelho
- Rádio Popular–Boavista
- SwiftCarbon Pro Cycling
- Tavfer–Measindot–Mortágua
- W52 / FC Porto

== Schedule ==
Stage characteristics and winners
Stage	Date	Course	Distance	Type	Winner
P	4 August	Lisbon	5.4 km (3.4 mi)	Individual time trial	Rafael Reis (POR)
1	5 August	Torres Vedras to Setúbal	175.8 km (109.2 mi)	Hilly stage	Rafael Reis (POR)
2	6 August	Ponte de Sor to Castelo Branco	162.1 km (100.7 mi)	Hilly stage	Kyle Murphy (USA)
3	7 August	Sertã to Covilhã (Torre)	170.3 km (105.8 mi)	Mountain stage	Alejandro Marque (ESP)
4	8 August	Belmonte to Guarda	181.6 km (112.8 mi)	Mountain stage	Frederico Figueiredo (POR)
	9 August	Guarda		Rest day	
5	10 August	Águeda to Santo Tirso (Santuário de Nossa Senhora da Assunção)	171.3 km (106.4 mi)	Hilly stage	Mason Hollyman (GBR)
6	11 August	Viana do Castelo to Fafe	182.4 km (113.3 mi)	Hilly stage	Ben King (USA)
7	12 August	Felgueiras to Bragança	193.2 km (120.0 mi)	Hilly stage	Rafael Reis (POR)
8	13 August	Bragança to Montalegre (Serra do Larouco)	160.7 km (99.9 mi)	Mountain stage	Kyle Murphy (USA)
9	14 August	Boticas to Mondim de Basto (Santuário de Nossa Senhora da Graça)	145.5 km (90.4 mi)	Mountain stage	Mauricio Moreira (URU)
10	15 August	Viseu to Viseu	20.3 km (12.6 mi)	Individual time trial	Rafael Reis (POR)
Total			1,568.6 km (974.7 mi)		

== Stages ==
=== Prologue ===
4 August 2021 — Lisbon, 5.4 km (3.4 mi) (ITT)

Prologue Result
Rank	Rider	Team	Time
1	Rafael Reis (POR)	Efapel	6' 10"
2	Mauricio Moreira (URU)	Efapel	+ 11"
3	Lluís Mas (ESP)	Movistar Team	+ 11"
4	Diego López (ESP)	Equipo Kern Pharma	+ 15"
5	Mathias Norsgaard (DEN)	Movistar Team	+ 17"
6	Samuel Caldeira (POR)	W52 / FC Porto	+ 18"
7	Juri Hollmann (GER)	Movistar Team	+ 19"
8	Tom Wirtgen (LUX)	Bingoal Pauwels Sauces WB	+ 19"
9	Aleksandr Grigoriev (RUS)	Atum General / Tavira / Maria Nova Hotel	+ 20"
10	Gustavo César (ESP)	Atum General / Tavira / Maria Nova Hotel	+ 20"

General classification after Prologue
Rank	Rider	Team	Time
1	Rafael Reis (POR)	Efapel	6' 10"
2	Mauricio Moreira (URU)	Efapel	+ 11"
3	Lluís Mas (ESP)	Movistar Team	+ 11"
4	Diego López (ESP)	Equipo Kern Pharma	+ 15"
5	Mathias Norsgaard (DEN)	Movistar Team	+ 17"
6	Samuel Caldeira (POR)	W52 / FC Porto	+ 18"
7	Juri Hollmann (GER)	Movistar Team	+ 19"
8	Tom Wirtgen (LUX)	Bingoal Pauwels Sauces WB	+ 19"
9	Aleksandr Grigorev (RUS)	Atum General / Tavira / Maria Nova Hotel	+ 20"
10	Gustavo César (ESP)	Atum General / Tavira / Maria Nova Hotel	+ 20"

=== Stage 1 ===
5 August 2021 — Torres Vedras to Setúbal, 175.8 km (109.2 mi)

Stage 1 Result
Rank	Rider	Team	Time
1	Rafael Reis (POR)	Efapel	4h 12' 23"
2	Alex Molenaar (NED)	Burgos BH	+ 2"
3	Sergio Samitier (ESP)	Movistar Team	+ 2"
4	Luís Gomes (POR)	Kelly / Simoldes / UDO	+ 2"
5	Luís Fernandes (POR)	Rádio Popular–Boavista	+ 2"
6	Rafael Silva (POR)	Antarte–Feirense	+ 2"
7	Kenny Molly (BEL)	Bingoal Pauwels Sauces WB	+ 2"
8	Orluis Aular (VEN)	Caja Rural–Seguros RGA	+ 2"
9	César Fonte (POR)	Kelly / Simoldes / UDO	+ 2"
10	~~Amaro Antunes~~ (POR)	W52 / FC Porto	+ 2"

General classification after Stage 1
Rank	Rider	Team	Time
1	Rafael Reis (POR)	Efapel	4h 18' 33"
2	Mauricio Moreira (URU)	Efapel	+ 13"
3	Diego López (ESP)	Equipo Kern Pharma	+ 17"
4	Juri Hollmann (GER)	Movistar Team	+ 21"
5	Tom Wirtgen (LUX)	Bingoal Pauwels Sauces WB	+ 21"
6	Gustavo César (ESP)	Atum General / Tavira / Maria Nova Hotel	+ 22"
7	António Carvalho (POR)	Efapel	+ 22"
8	Joni Brandão (POR)	W52 / FC Porto	+ 23"
9	Orluis Aular (VEN)	Caja Rural–Seguros RGA	+ 24"
10	Javier Moreno (ESP)	Efapel	+ 24"

=== Stage 2 ===
6 August 2021 — Ponte de Sor to Castelo Branco, 162.1 km (100.7 mi)

Stage 2 Result
Rank	Rider	Team	Time
1	Kyle Murphy (USA)	Rally Cycling	3h 57' 49"
2	Joni Brandão (POR)	W52 / FC Porto	+ 12"
3	Lluís Mas (ESP)	Movistar Team	+ 17"
4	Daniel Freitas (POR)	Rádio Popular–Boavista	+ 17"
5	Luís Gomes (POR)	Kelly / Simoldes / UDO	+ 17"
6	Daniel Mestre (POR)	W52 / FC Porto	+ 17"
7	Kenny Molly (BEL)	Bingoal Pauwels Sauces WB	+ 17"
8	Tom Wirtgen (LUX)	Bingoal Pauwels Sauces WB	+ 17"
9	Tomás Contte (ARG)	Louletano–Loulé Concelho	+ 17"
10	Juri Hollmann (GER)	Movistar Team	+ 17"

General classification after Stage 2
Rank	Rider	Team	Time
1	Rafael Reis (POR)	Efapel	8h 16' 39"
2	Mauricio Moreira (URU)	Efapel	+ 13"
3	Diego López (ESP)	Equipo Kern Pharma	+ 17"
4	Joni Brandão (POR)	W52 / FC Porto	+ 18"
5	Juri Hollmann (GER)	Movistar Team	+ 21"
6	Tom Wirtgen (LUX)	Bingoal Pauwels Sauces WB	+ 21"
7	Gustavo César (ESP)	Atum General / Tavira / Maria Nova Hotel	+ 22"
8	António Carvalho (POR)	Efapel	+ 22"
9	Orluis Aular (VEN)	Caja Rural–Seguros RGA	+ 24"
10	Javier Moreno (ESP)	Efapel	+ 24"

=== Stage 3 ===
7 August 2021 — Sertã to Covilhã (Torre), 170.3 km (105.8 mi)

Stage 3 Result
Rank	Rider	Team	Time
1	Alejandro Marque (ESP)	Atum General / Tavira / Maria Nova Hotel	4h 59' 10"
2	Mauricio Moreira (URU)	Efapel	+ 1' 03"
3	Abner González (PUR)	Movistar Team	+ 1' 03"
4	~~Amaro Antunes~~ (POR)	W52 / FC Porto	+ 1' 12"
5	Gustavo César (ESP)	Atum General / Tavira / Maria Nova Hotel	+ 1' 12"
6	Luís Gomes (POR)	Kelly / Simoldes / UDO	+ 1' 26"
7	Joni Brandão (POR)	W52 / FC Porto	+ 1' 33"
8	Luís Fernandes (POR)	Rádio Popular–Boavista	+ 1' 36"
9	Frederico Figueiredo (POR)	Efapel	+ 1' 36"
10	João Rodrigues (POR)	W52 / FC Porto	+ 1' 38"

General classification after Stage 3
Rank	Rider	Team	Time
1	Alejandro Marque (ESP)	Atum General / Tavira / Maria Nova Hotel	13h 16' 14"
2	Gustavo César (ESP)	Atum General / Tavira / Maria Nova Hotel	+ 1' 09"
3	Joni Brandão (POR)	W52 / FC Porto	+ 1' 26"
4	~~Amaro Antunes~~ (POR)	W52 / FC Porto	+ 1' 26"
5	Abner González (PUR)	Movistar Team	+ 1' 28"
6	Luís Gomes (POR)	Kelly / Simoldes / UDO	+ 1' 30"
7	Mauricio Moreira (URU)	Efapel	+ 1' 31"
8	João Rodrigues (POR)	W52 / FC Porto	+ 1' 37"
9	António Carvalho (POR)	Efapel	+ 1' 37"
10	Frederico Figueiredo (POR)	Efapel	+ 1' 46"

=== Stage 4 ===
8 August 2021 — Belmonte to Guarda, 181.6 km (112.8 mi)

Stage 4 Result
Rank	Rider	Team	Time
1	Frederico Figueiredo (POR)	Efapel	4h 28' 25"
2	~~Amaro Antunes~~ (POR)	W52 / FC Porto	+ 0"
3	Mauricio Moreira (URU)	Efapel	+ 59"
4	Joni Brandão (POR)	W52 / FC Porto	+ 1' 03"
5	Abner González (PUR)	Movistar Team	+ 1' 03"
6	Tiago Antunes (POR)	Tavfer–Measindot–Mortágua	+ 1' 08"
7	Daniel Freitas (POR)	Rádio Popular–Boavista	+ 1' 10"
8	António Carvalho (POR)	Efapel	+ 1' 10"
9	Luís Fernandes (POR)	Rádio Popular–Boavista	+ 1' 10"
10	Henrique Casimiro (POR)	Kelly / Simoldes / UDO	+ 1' 10"

General classification after Stage 4
Rank	Rider	Team	Time
1	Alejandro Marque (ESP)	Atum General / Tavira / Maria Nova Hotel	17h 46' 00"
2	~~Amaro Antunes~~ (POR)	W52 / FC Porto	+ 5"
3	Frederico Figueiredo (POR)	Efapel	+ 25"
4	Joni Brandão (POR)	W52 / FC Porto	+ 1' 08"
5	Mauricio Moreira (URU)	Efapel	+ 1' 09"
6	Abner González (PUR)	Movistar Team	+ 1' 10"
7	António Carvalho (POR)	Efapel	+ 1' 26"
8	João Rodrigues (POR)	W52 / FC Porto	+ 1' 31"
9	Luís Fernandes (POR)	Rádio Popular–Boavista	+ 1' 49"
10	Diego López (ESP)	Equipo Kern Pharma	+ 1' 56"

=== Stage 5 ===
10 August 2021 — Águeda to Santo Tirso (Santuário de Nossa Senhora da Assunção), 171.3 km (106.4 mi)

Stage 5 Result
Rank	Rider	Team	Time
1	Mason Hollyman (GBR)	Israel Cycling Academy	4h 11' 48"
2	Ricardo Mestre (POR)	W52 / FC Porto	+ 35"
3	Tomás Contte (ARG)	Louletano–Loulé Concelho	+ 1' 00"
4	Rafael Reis (POR)	Efapel	+ 1' 02"
5	Lluís Mas (ESP)	Movistar Team	+ 1' 05"
6	Daniel Freitas (POR)	Rádio Popular–Boavista	+ 1' 09"
7	Juan Antonio López-Cózar (ESP)	Burgos BH	+ 1' 16"
8	Juri Hollmann (GER)	Movistar Team	+ 1' 36"
9	Luis Mendonça (POR)	Efapel	+ 1' 44"
10	César Fonte (POR)	Kelly / Simoldes / UDO	+ 1' 47"

General classification after Stage 5
Rank	Rider	Team	Time
1	Daniel Freitas (POR)	Rádio Popular–Boavista	22h 02' 16"
2	Alejandro Marque (ESP)	Atum General / Tavira / Maria Nova Hotel	+ 42"
3	~~Amaro Antunes~~ (POR)	W52 / FC Porto	+ 47"
4	Frederico Figueiredo (POR)	Efapel	+ 1' 07"
5	Mauricio Moreira (URU)	Efapel	+ 1' 45"
6	Abner González (PUR)	Movistar Team	+ 1' 46"
7	Joni Brandão (POR)	W52 / FC Porto	+ 1' 47"
8	António Carvalho (POR)	Efapel	+ 2' 08"
9	João Rodrigues (POR)	W52 / FC Porto	+ 2' 21"
10	Luís Fernandes (POR)	Rádio Popular–Boavista	+ 2' 31"

=== Stage 6 ===
11 August 2021 — Viana do Castelo to Fafe, 182.4 km (113.3 mi)

Stage 6 Result
Rank	Rider	Team	Time
1	Ben King (USA)	Rally Cycling	4h 22' 00"
2	Alastair Mackellar (AUS)	Israel Cycling Academy	+ 9"
3	Tom Wirtgen (LUX)	Bingoal Pauwels Sauces WB	+ 15"
4	Juan Diego Alba (COL)	Movistar Team	+ 20"
5	Bruno Silva (POR)	Antarte–Feirense	+ 24"
6	Roniel Campos (VEN)	Louletano–Loulé Concelho	+ 45"
7	Mason Hollyman (GBR)	Israel Cycling Academy	+ 1' 19"
8	Pedro Paulinho (POR)	Tavfer–Measindot–Mortágua	+ 1' 26"
9	Hélder Gonçalves (POR)	Kelly / Simoldes / UDO	+ 1' 27"
10	Marvin Scheulen (POR)	LA Alumínios / LA Sport	+ 1' 45"

General classification after Stage 6
Rank	Rider	Team	Time
1	Alejandro Marque (ESP)	Atum General / Tavira / Maria Nova Hotel	26h 33' 11"
2	~~Amaro Antunes~~ (POR)	W52 / FC Porto	+ 5"
3	Frederico Figueiredo (POR)	Efapel	+ 25"
4	Mauricio Moreira (URU)	Efapel	+ 1' 01"
5	Abner González (PUR)	Movistar Team	+ 1' 04"
6	Joni Brandão (POR)	W52 / FC Porto	+ 1' 05"
7	António Carvalho (POR)	Efapel	+ 1' 26"
8	João Rodrigues (POR)	W52 / FC Porto	+ 1' 39"
9	Henrique Casimiro (POR)	Kelly / Simoldes / UDO	+ 1' 53"
10	Tiago Antunes (POR)	Tavfer–Measindot–Mortágua	+ 2' 34"

=== Stage 7 ===
12 August 2021 — Felgueiras to Bragança, 193.2 km (120.0 mi)

Stage 7 Result
Rank	Rider	Team	Time
1	Rafael Reis (POR)	Efapel	4h 35' 30"
2	Ben King (USA)	Rally Cycling	+ 16"
3	Diego López (ESP)	Equipo Kern Pharma	+ 16"
4	Joaquim Silva (POR)	Tavfer–Measindot–Mortágua	+ 16"
5	Adrià Moreno (ESP)	Burgos BH	+ 16"
6	Adrián Bustamante (COL)	Kelly / Simoldes / UDO	+ 16"
7	Pedro Miguel Lopes (POR)	Kelly / Simoldes / UDO	+ 16"
8	Javier Moreno (ESP)	Efapel	+ 16"
9	Nuno Meireles (POR)	Louletano–Loulé Concelho	+ 16"
10	Vicente García de Mateos (ESP)	Antarte–Feirense	+ 16"

General classification after Stage 7
Rank	Rider	Team	Time
1	Rafael Reis (POR)	Efapel	31h 11' 46"
2	Alejandro Marque (ESP)	Atum General / Tavira / Maria Nova Hotel	+ 28"
3	~~Amaro Antunes~~ (POR)	W52 / FC Porto	+ 33"
4	Javier Moreno (ESP)	Efapel	+ 36"
5	Diego López (ESP)	Equipo Kern Pharma	+ 44"
6	Frederico Figueiredo (POR)	Efapel	+ 53"
7	Ricardo Vilela (POR)	W52 / FC Porto	+ 1' 16"
8	Vicente García de Mateos (ESP)	Antarte–Feirense	+ 1' 18"
9	Joaquim Silva (POR)	Tavfer–Measindot–Mortágua	+ 1' 23"
10	Mauricio Moreira (URU)	Efapel	+ 1' 29"

=== Stage 8 ===
13 August 2021 — Bragança to Montalegre (Serra do Larouco), 160.7 km (99.9 mi)

Stage 8 Result
Rank	Rider	Team	Time
1	Kyle Murphy (USA)	Rally Cycling	4h 12' 06"
2	José Félix Parra (ESP)	Equipo Kern Pharma	+ 13"
3	Henrique Casimiro (POR)	Kelly / Simoldes / UDO	+ 25"
4	Gaspar Gonçalves (POR)	Tavfer–Measindot–Mortágua	+ 54"
5	Adrià Moreno (ESP)	Burgos BH	+ 58"
6	Mauricio Moreira (URU)	Efapel	+ 1' 10"
7	Carlos Salgueiro (POR)	LA Alumínios / LA Sport	+ 1' 10"
8	Joni Brandão (POR)	W52 / FC Porto	+ 1' 14"
9	Frederico Figueiredo (POR)	Efapel	+ 1' 14"
10	~~Amaro Antunes~~ (POR)	W52 / FC Porto	+ 1' 16"

General classification after Stage 8
Rank	Rider	Team	Time
1	~~Amaro Antunes~~ (POR)	W52 / FC Porto	35h 25' 41"
2	Alejandro Marque (ESP)	Atum General / Tavira / Maria Nova Hotel	+ 14"
3	Frederico Figueiredo (POR)	Efapel	+ 18"
4	Mauricio Moreira (URU)	Efapel	+ 50"
5	Henrique Casimiro (POR)	Kelly / Simoldes / UDO	+ 57"
6	Joni Brandão (POR)	W52 / FC Porto	+ 58"
7	José Félix Parra (ESP)	Equipo Kern Pharma	+ 1' 52"
8	Abner González (PUR)	Movistar Team	+ 1' 53"
9	António Carvalho (POR)	Efapel	+ 2' 15"
10	Tiago Antunes (POR)	Tavfer–Measindot–Mortágua	+ 2' 33"

=== Stage 9 ===
14 August 2021 — Boticas to Mondim de Basto (Santuário de Nossa Senhora da Graça), 145.5 km (90.4 mi)

Stage 9 Result
Rank	Rider	Team	Time
1	Mauricio Moreira (URU)	Efapel	3h 47' 36"
2	~~Amaro Antunes~~ (POR)	W52 / FC Porto	+ 8"
3	Joni Brandão (POR)	W52 / FC Porto	+ 14"
4	Frederico Figueiredo (POR)	Efapel	+ 45"
5	José Félix Parra (ESP)	Equipo Kern Pharma	+ 56"
6	Abner González (PUR)	Movistar Team	+ 1' 07"
7	Alejandro Marque (ESP)	Atum General / Tavira / Maria Nova Hotel	+ 1' 12"
8	António Carvalho (POR)	Efapel	+ 3' 00"
9	João Rodrigues (POR)	W52 / FC Porto	+ 3' 13"
10	Carlos Oyarzún (CHI)	Louletano–Loulé Concelho	+ 5' 46"

General classification after Stage 9
Rank	Rider	Team	Time
1	~~Amaro Antunes~~ (POR)	W52 / FC Porto	39h 13' 25"
2	Mauricio Moreira (URU)	Efapel	+ 42"
3	Frederico Figueiredo (POR)	Efapel	+ 55"
4	Joni Brandão (POR)	W52 / FC Porto	+ 1' 04"
5	Alejandro Marque (ESP)	Atum General / Tavira / Maria Nova Hotel	+ 1' 18"
6	José Félix Parra (ESP)	Equipo Kern Pharma	+ 2' 40"
7	Abner González (PUR)	Movistar Team	+ 2' 52"
8	António Carvalho (POR)	Efapel	+ 5' 07"
9	João Rodrigues (POR)	W52 / FC Porto	+ 6' 22"
10	Henrique Casimiro (POR)	Kelly / Simoldes / UDO	+ 8' 19"

=== Stage 10 ===
15 August 2021 — Viseu to Viseu, 20.3 km (12.6 mi) (ITT)

Stage 10 Result
Rank	Rider	Team	Time
1	Rafael Reis (POR)	Efapel	25' 24"
2	Mauricio Moreira (URU)	Efapel	+ 12"
3	Juri Hollmann (GER)	Movistar Team	+ 41"
4	~~Amaro Antunes~~ (POR)	W52 / FC Porto	+ 44"
5	Alejandro Marque (ESP)	Atum General / Tavira / Maria Nova Hotel	+ 49"
6	Lluís Mas (ESP)	Movistar Team	+ 49"
7	João Rodrigues (POR)	W52 / FC Porto	+ 54"
8	António Carvalho (POR)	Efapel	+ 55"
9	Mathias Norsgaard (DEN)	Movistar Team	+ 1' 01"
10	Ricardo Mestre (POR)	W52 / FC Porto	+ 1' 05"

General classification after Stage 10
Rank	Rider	Team	Time
1	~~Amaro Antunes~~ (POR)	W52 / FC Porto	39h 39' 33"
2	Mauricio Moreira (URU)	Efapel	+ 10"
3	Alejandro Marque (ESP)	Atum General / Tavira / Maria Nova Hotel	+ 1' 23"
4	Joni Brandão (POR)	W52 / FC Porto	+ 1' 36"
5	Frederico Figueiredo (POR)	Efapel	+ 2' 04"
6	Abner González (PUR)	Movistar Team	+ 3' 43"
7	José Félix Parra (ESP)	Equipo Kern Pharma	+ 3' 49"
8	António Carvalho (POR)	Efapel	+ 5' 18"
9	João Rodrigues (POR)	W52 / FC Porto	+ 6' 32"
10	Henrique Casimiro (POR)	Kelly / Simoldes / UDO	+ 9' 51"

== Classification leadership table ==
Classification leadership by stage
Stage	Winner	General classification	Points classification	Mountains classification	Young rider classification	Team classification	Combination classification	Portuguese rider classification
P	Rafael Reis	Rafael Reis	not awarded	not awarded	Juri Hollmann	Efapel	not awarded	Rafael Reis
1	Rafael Reis	Rafael Reis	Rafael Reis	Hugo Nunes	Juri Hollmann	Efapel	César Fonte	Rafael Reis
2	Kyle Murphy	Rafael Reis	Kyle Murphy	Marvin Scheulen	Juri Hollmann	Efapel	César Fonte	Rafael Reis
3	Alejandro Marque	Alejandro Marque	Luís Gomes	Alejandro Marque	Abner González	Efapel	Luís Gomes	Joni Brandão
4	Frederico Figueiredo	Alejandro Marque	Luís Gomes	~~Amaro Antunes~~	Abner González	Efapel	~~Amaro Antunes~~	~~Amaro Antunes~~
5	Mason Hollyman	Daniel Freitas	Luís Gomes	~~Amaro Antunes~~	Abner González	Efapel	~~Amaro Antunes~~	Daniel Freitas
6	Ben King	Alejandro Marque	Luís Gomes	Bruno Silva	Abner González	Efapel	~~Amaro Antunes~~	~~Amaro Antunes~~
7	Rafael Reis	Rafael Reis	Rafael Reis	Bruno Silva	Abner González	Efapel	Rafael Reis	Rafael Reis
8	Kyle Murphy	~~Amaro Antunes~~	Rafael Reis	Bruno Silva	Abner González	Efapel	~~Amaro Antunes~~	~~Amaro Antunes~~
9	Mauricio Moreira	~~Amaro Antunes~~	Rafael Reis	Bruno Silva	Abner González	Efapel	Mauricio Moreira	~~Amaro Antunes~~
10	Rafael Reis	~~Amaro Antunes~~	Rafael Reis	Bruno Silva	Abner González	Efapel	Mauricio Moreira	~~Amaro Antunes~~
Final		~~Amaro Antunes~~	Rafael Reis	Bruno Silva	Abner González	Efapel	Mauricio Moreira	~~Amaro Antunes~~

- On stage 2, Alex Molenaar, who was second in the points classification, wore the green jersey, because first-placed Rafael Reis wore the yellow jersey as the leader of the general classification. For the same reason, Ben King will wear the green jersey on stage 8.
- On stage 4, Hugo Nunes, who was second in the mountains classification, wore the polka dot jersey, because first-placed Alejandro Marque wore the yellow jersey as the leader of the general classification.
- Before stage 6, Rádio Popular–Boavista, the team of general classification leader Daniel Freitas, withdrew due to a suspected COVID-19 case within the team. As a result, on stage 6, second-placed Alejandro Marque wore the yellow jersey.

== Final classification standings ==
Legend
Denotes the winner of the general classification	Denotes the winner of the mountains classification
Denotes the winner of the points classification	Denotes the winner of the young rider classification

=== General classification ===
Final general classification (1–10)
Rank	Rider	Team	Time
1	~~Amaro Antunes~~ (POR)	W52 / FC Porto	39h 39' 33"
2	Mauricio Moreira (URU)	Efapel	+ 10"
3	Alejandro Marque (ESP)	Atum General / Tavira / Maria Nova Hotel	+ 1' 23"
4	Joni Brandão (POR)	W52 / FC Porto	+ 1' 36"
5	Frederico Figueiredo (POR)	Efapel	+ 2' 04"
6	Abner González (PUR)	Movistar Team	+ 3' 43"
7	José Félix Parra (ESP)	Equipo Kern Pharma	+ 3' 49"
8	António Carvalho (POR)	Efapel	+ 5' 18"
9	João Rodrigues (POR)	W52 / FC Porto	+ 6' 32"
10	Henrique Casimiro (POR)	Kelly / Simoldes / UDO	+ 9' 51"

=== Points classification ===
Final points classification (1–10)
Rank	Rider	Team	Points
1	Rafael Reis (POR)	Efapel	138
2	Luís Gomes (POR)	Kelly / Simoldes / UDO	84
3	Ben King (USA)	Rally Cycling	78
4	Kyle Murphy (USA)	Rally Cycling	56
5	Joni Brandão (POR)	W52 / FC Porto	54
6	Lluís Mas (ESP)	Movistar Team	45
7	Mauricio Moreira (URU)	Efapel	42
8	Mason Hollyman (GBR)	Israel Cycling Academy	37
9	Alastair Mackellar (AUS)	Israel Cycling Academy	37
10	~~Amaro Antunes~~ (POR)	W52 / FC Porto	36

=== Mountains classification ===
Final mountains classification (1–10)
Rank	Rider	Team	Points
1	Bruno Silva (POR)	Antarte–Feirense	57
2	Mauricio Moreira (URU)	Efapel	56
3	~~Amaro Antunes~~ (POR)	W52 / FC Porto	54
4	Frederico Figueiredo (POR)	Efapel	51
5	Roniel Campos (VEN)	Louletano–Loulé Concelho	42
6	Alejandro Marque (ESP)	Atum General / Tavira / Maria Nova Hotel	36
7	Joni Brandão (POR)	W52 / FC Porto	33
8	José Félix Parra (ESP)	Equipo Kern Pharma	31
9	Rafael Silva (POR)	Antarte–Feirense	30
10	Kyle Murphy (USA)	Rally Cycling	27

=== Young rider classification ===
Final young rider classification (1–10)
Rank	Rider	Team	Time
1	Abner González (PUR)	Movistar Team	39h 43' 16"
2	Pedro Miguel Lopes (POR)	Kelly / Simoldes / UDO	+ 53' 19"
3	Mason Hollyman (GBR)	Israel Cycling Academy	+ 1h 01' 48"
4	Hélder Gonçalves (POR)	Kelly / Simoldes / UDO	+ 1h 02' 20"
5	Juri Hollmann (GER)	Movistar Team	+ 1h 44' 28"
6	Alex Molenaar (NED)	Burgos BH	+ 1h 54' 39"
7	Carlos Salgueiro (POR)	LA Alumínios / LA Sport	+ 1h 57' 40"
8	Alastair Mackellar (AUS)	Israel Cycling Academy	+ 2h 10' 46"
9	João Macedo (POR)	LA Alumínios / LA Sport	+ 2h 10' 46"
10	Pedro Pinto (POR)	Tavfer–Measindot–Mortágua	+ 2h 10' 51"

=== Portuguese rider classification ===
Final Portuguese rider classification (1–10)
Rank	Rider	Team	Time
1	~~Amaro Antunes~~ (POR)	W52 / FC Porto	39h 39' 33"
2	Joni Brandão (POR)	W52 / FC Porto	+ 1' 36"
3	Frederico Figueiredo (POR)	Efapel	+ 2' 04"
4	António Carvalho (POR)	Efapel	+ 5' 18"
5	João Rodrigues (POR)	W52 / FC Porto	+ 6' 32"
6	Henrique Casimiro (POR)	Kelly / Simoldes / UDO	+ 9' 51"
7	Tiago Antunes (POR)	Tavfer–Measindot–Mortágua	+ 12' 16"
8	Ricardo Vilela (POR)	W52 / FC Porto	+ 13' 15"
9	Nuno Meireles (POR)	Louletano–Loulé Concelho	+ 21' 17"
10	Gaspar Gonçalves (POR)	Tavfer–Measindot–Mortágua	+ 22' 20"

=== Combination classification ===
Final combination classification (1–10)
Rank	Rider	Team	Points
1	Mauricio Moreira (URU)	Efapel	11
2	~~Amaro Antunes~~ (POR)	W52 / FC Porto	14
3	Joni Brandão (POR)	W52 / FC Porto	16
4	Frederico Figueiredo (POR)	Efapel	26
5	Alejandro Marque (ESP)	Atum General / Tavira / Maria Nova Hotel	39
6	Rafael Reis (POR)	Efapel	42
7	Abner González (PUR)	Movistar Team	44
8	Bruno Silva (POR)	Antarte–Feirense	47
9	José Félix Parra (ESP)	Equipo Kern Pharma	50
10	Lluís Mas (ESP)	Movistar Team	56

=== Team classification ===
Final team classification (1–10)
Rank	Team	Time
1	Efapel	118h 45' 58"
2	W52 / FC Porto	+ 10' 42"
3	Kelly / Simoldes / UDO	+ 44' 56"
4	Louletano–Loulé Concelho	+ 47' 42"
5	Tavfer–Measindot–Mortágua	+ 1h 03' 15"
6	Movistar Team	+ 1h 22' 58"
7	Burgos BH	+ 1h 40' 11"
8	Atum General / Tavira / Maria Nova Hotel	+ 1h 56' 19"
9	Equipo Kern Pharma	+ 1h 57' 46"
10	Antarte–Feirense	+ 1h 59' 02"
