= Cylance Pro Cycling =

Cylance Pro Cycling may refer to:

- Cylance Pro Cycling (men's team), a professional cycling team that competes on the UCI Continental Circuits
- Cylance Pro Cycling (women's team), a professional cycling team that competes on the UCI Women's World Tour
