= Scott McGill =

Scott McGill may refer to:

- Scott McGill (footballer)
- Scott McGill (cyclist)
