= Frederico Figueiredo =

Portuguese cyclist

Personal information
- Full name: Frederico José Oliveira Figueiredo
- Born: 25 May 1991 (age 35)
- Height: 1.68 m (5 ft 6 in)
- Weight: 56 kg (123 lb)

Cycling career
- Sport: Cycling
- Current team: Anicolor / Campicarn
- Discipline: Road
- Role: Rider

Amateur teams
- 2010–2011: Cartaxo Capital do Vinho
- 2012: Liberty Seguros–Santa Maria da Feira–Specializaed
- 2013: Liberty Seguros–Feira–KTM

Professional teams
- 2014–2016: Rádio Popular
- 2017–2020: Sporting / Tavira
- 2021–: Efapel

Frederico José Oliveira Figueiredo (born 25 May 1991) is a Portuguese cyclist, who currently rides for UCI Continental team Anicolor / Campicarn.

== Major results ==
2012
1st Gran Premio Ciudad de Vigo II
2013
1st Mountains classification Vuelta a la Comunidad de Madrid Sub 23
2nd Overall Tour of Galicia
3rd Road race, National Under-23 Road Championships
2014
7th Overall Volta ao Alentejo
8th Overall Vuelta a Castilla y León
9th Overall Troféu Joaquim Agostinho
2015
9th Overall Route du Sud
2016
10th Overall GP Beiras e Serra da Estrela
10th GP Miguel Induráin
2017
3rd Overall Troféu Joaquim Agostinho
5th Overall Vuelta a Castilla y León
5th Road race, National Road Championships
8th Clássica da Arrábida
9th Clássica Aldeias do Xisto
10th Overall GP Beiras e Serra da Estrela
2018
5th Overall Volta a Portugal
7th Overall Vuelta a Aragón
7th Overall Troféu Joaquim Agostinho
7th Clássica Aldeias do Xisto
9th Road race, Mediterranean Games
2019
4th Road race, National Road Championships
4th Overall Troféu Joaquim Agostinho
5th Overall GP Beiras e Serra da Estrela
2020
1st Overall Troféu Joaquim Agostinho

1st Stage 2

3rd Overall Volta a Portugal
2021
1st Overall Troféu Joaquim Agostinho

1st Points classification
1st Stage 1

5th Overall Volta a Portugal

1st Stage 4

10th Clássica da Arrábida
2022
1st Overall Troféu Joaquim Agostinho

1st Mountains classification
1st Points classification
1st Stage 3

2nd Overall Volta a Portugal

1st Mountains classification
1st Stage 5
