= Kyle Murphy (cyclist) =

American cyclist

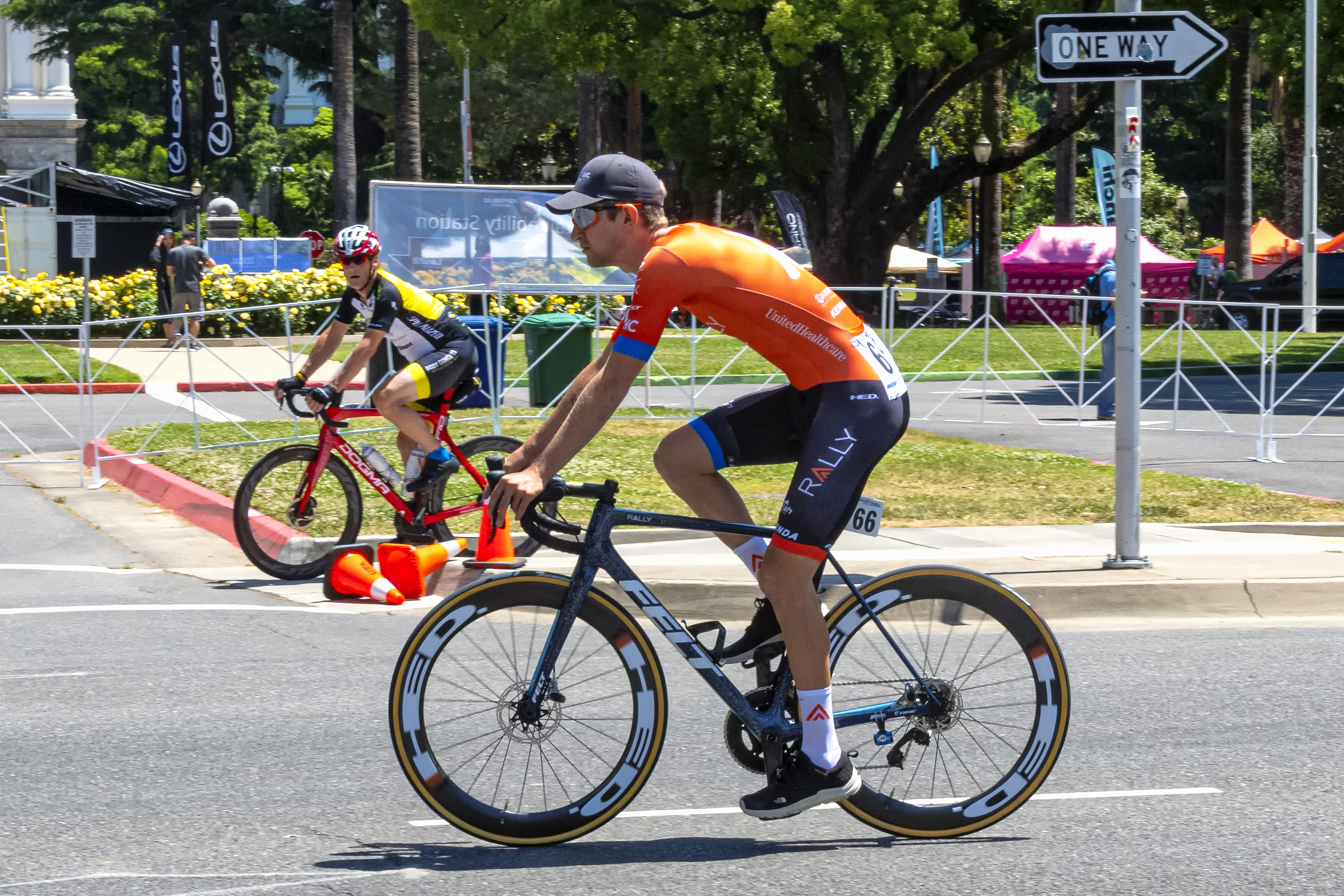

Personal information
- Full name: Kyle Murphy
- Born: October 5, 1991 (age 35) Palo Alto, California
- Height: 1.85 m (6 ft 1 in)
- Weight: 67 kg (148 lb)

Cycling career
- Sport: Cycling
- Current team: L39ION of Los Angeles
- Discipline: Road
- Role: Rider
- Rider type: All-rounder

Amateur teams
- 2013: CRCA–BH Comedy Central
- 2014: Champion System–Stan's NoTubes
- 2015: Caja Rural–Seguros RGA (stagiaire)

Professional teams
- 2015: Lupus Racing Team
- 2016: Team Jamis
- 2017: Cylance Pro Cycling
- 2018–2022: Rally Cycling
- 2023–: L39ION of Los Angeles

Major wins
- One-day races and classics National Road Race Championships (2022)

Kyle Murphy (born October 5, 1991) is an American professional racing cyclist, who currently rides for UCI Continental team L39ION of Los Angeles.

== Career ==
His first professional season was in 2015, riding for Lupus Racing Team, and he rode in his first U.S. National Championship. His 8th place at that event drew the attention of several other professional teams and he later rode as a stagiaire for Caja Rural–Seguros RGA at the USA Pro Cycling Challenge. Murphy was third in the King of the Mountains competition and rode in the main breakaways on three stages. He rode in the men's team time trial at the 2015 UCI Road World Championships. He joined Team Jamis for 2016; after they disbanded at the end of the year, he signed with Cylance Pro Cycling for the 2017 season. In October 2017 Rally Cycling announced that Murphy would join them for 2018.

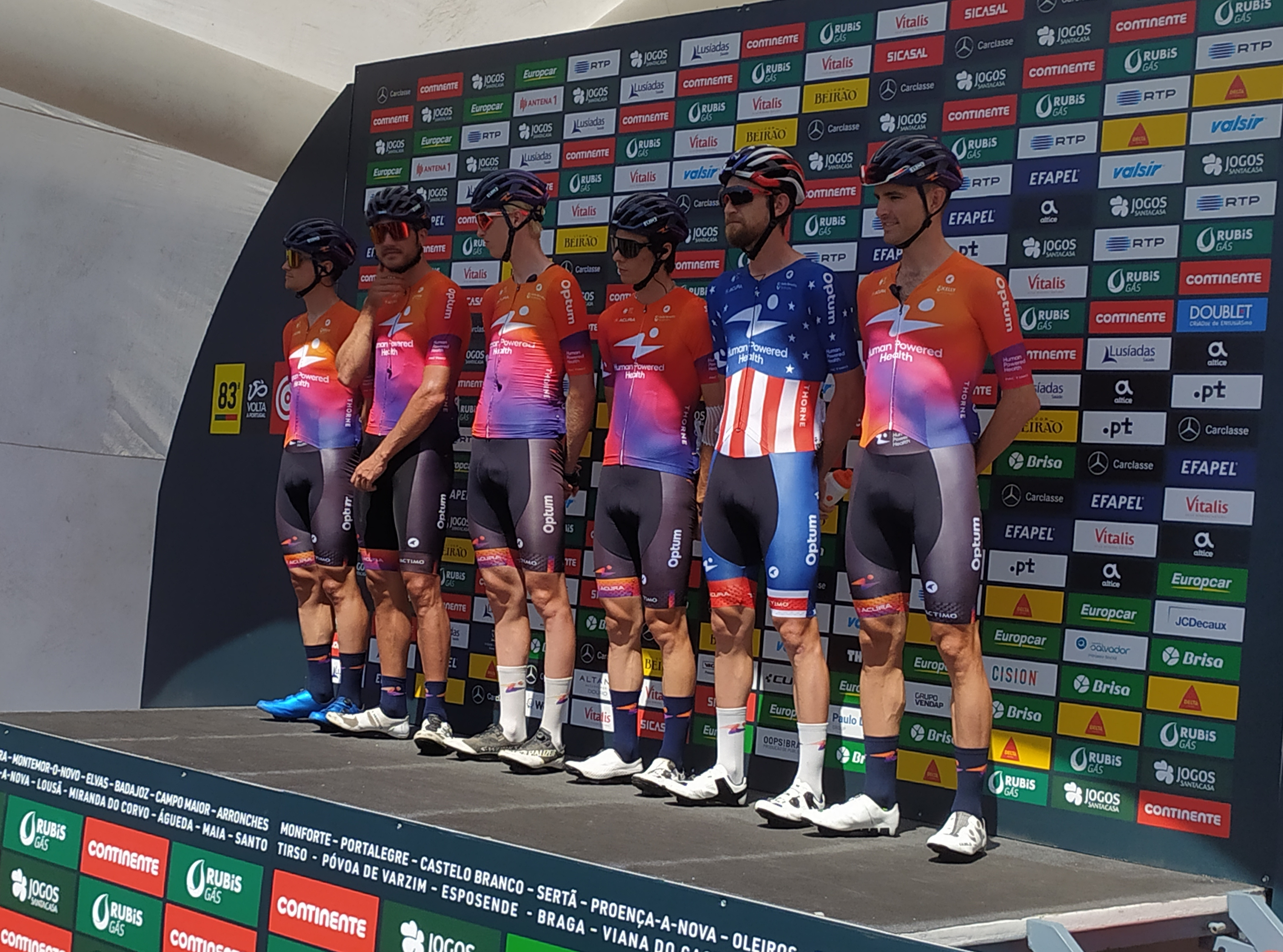
Kyle Murphy as US Champion in the 2022 Volta a Portugal.

== Major results ==
2014
10th Tobago Cycling Classic
2017
6th Overall Joe Martin Stage Race
10th Overall Tour of the Gila
2018
3rd Overall Tour of the Gila
2019
6th Overall Tour of Utah
6th Overall Tour de Beauce
10th Overall Tour of Turkey
2020
2nd Prueba Villafranca de Ordizia
2021
Volta a Portugal

1st Stages 2 & 8

2022
1st Road race, National Road Championships
5th Overall Tour of Antalya
