= Xavier Cañellas =

Spanish cyclist

Personal information
- Full name: Xavier Cañellas Sánchez
- Born: 16 March 1997 (age 29) Puigpunyent, Mallorca, Spain
- Height: 1.75 m (5 ft 9 in)
- Weight: 66 kg (146 lb)

Cycling career
- Sport: Cycling
- Current team: Euskaltel–Euskadi
- Disciplines: Road; Track
- Role: Rider

Amateur team
- 2016–2018: Caja Rural–Seguros RGA amateur

Professional teams
- 2019–2020: Caja Rural–Seguros RGA
- 2021–2022: Gios
- 2023: Electro Hiper Europa
- 2024–: Euskaltel–Euskadi

Xavier Cañellas Sánchez (born 16 March 1997) is a Spanish professional racing cyclist, who currently rides for UCI ProTeam Euskaltel–Euskadi. He rode in the men's team pursuit at the 2016 UCI Track Cycling World Championships.

== Major results ==
2018
6th Trofeo Campos, Porreres, Felanitx, Ses Salines
10th Trofeo Palma
2019
8th L'Etoile d'Or
2020
8th Overall Belgrade–Banja Luka

1st Stage 1

2021
9th Trofeo Alcudia – Port d'Alcudia
2022
2nd Paris–Troyes
3rd Prueba Villafranca de Ordizia
5th Trofeu Joaquim Agostinho
10th Clássica da Arrábida
2023
9th Overall GP Beiras e Serra da Estrela

1st Points classification
