= Alexis Guérin (cyclist) =

French cyclist

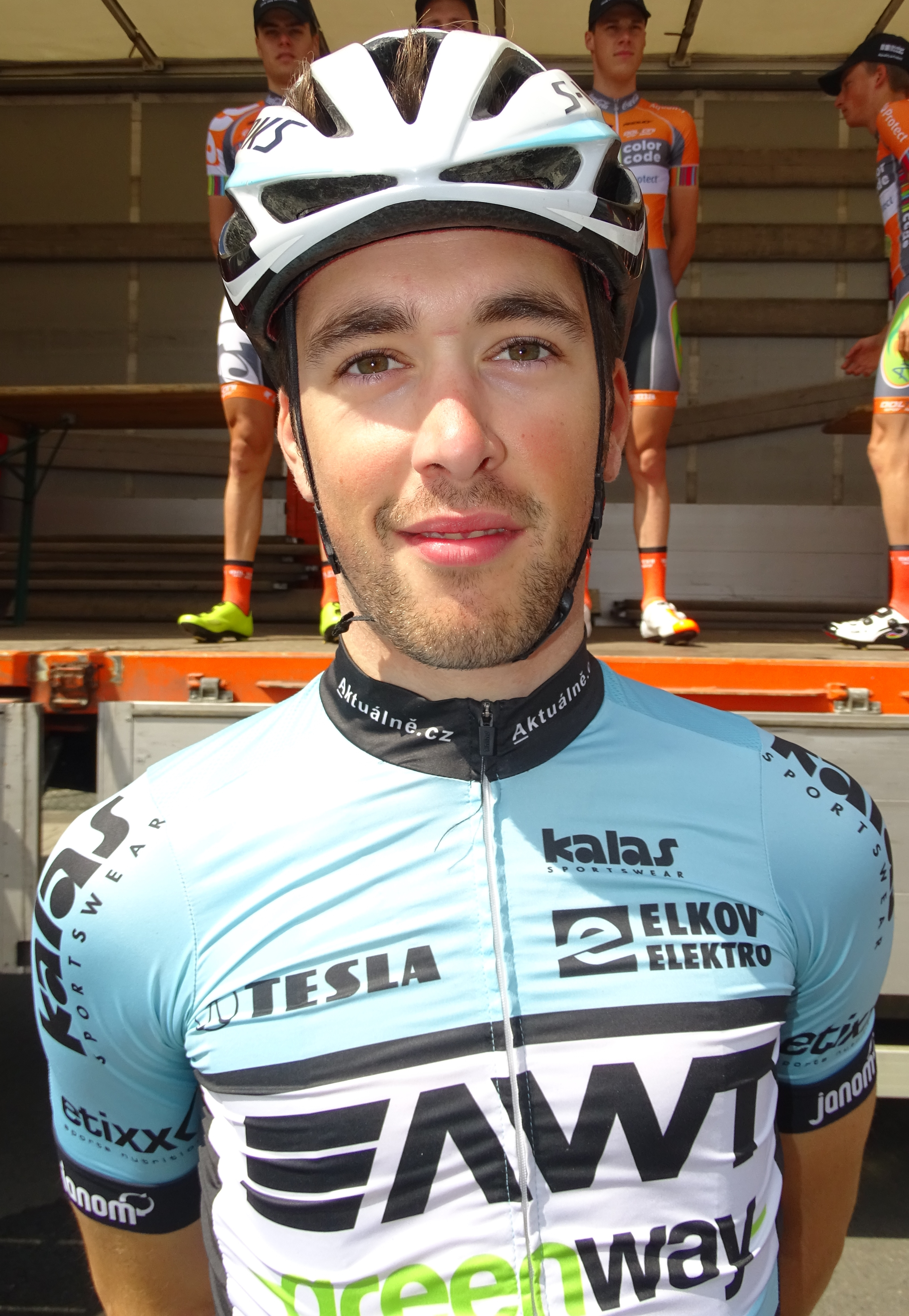
- Guérin in 2015.

Personal information
- Full name: Alexis Guérin
- Born: 6 June 1992 (age 34) Libourne, France
- Height: 1.76 m (5 ft 9 in)
- Weight: 65 kg (143 lb)

Cycling career
- Sport: Cycling
- Current team: Anicolor / Campicarn
- Discipline: Road
- Role: Rider

Amateur teams
- 2011: CC Marmande 47
- 2012–2013: Entente Sud Gascogne
- 2016: GSC Blagnac Vélo Sport 31
- 2017: VC Rouen 76
- 2018: Girondins de Bordeaux

Professional teams
- 2013: FDJ.fr (stagiaire)
- 2014–2015: Etixx
- 2018–2019: Delko–Marseille Provence KTM
- 2020–2022: Team Vorarlberg Santic
- 2023: Bingoal WB
- 2024: Philippe Wagner–Bazin
- 2025–: Anicolor / Tien 21

Alexis Guérin (French pronunciation: [alɛksi ɡeʁɛ̃]; born 6 June 1992 in Libourne) is a French cyclist, who currently rides for UCI Continental team Anicolor / Campicarn.

== Major results ==
2012
1st Stage 2 Ronde de l'Isard Ariege
2nd Time trial, National Under-23 Road Championships
2013
1st Mountains classification Tour du Gévaudan Languedoc-Roussillon
3rd Chrono des Nations U23
4th Overall Kreiz Breizh Elites
6th Time trial, UEC European Under-23 Road Championships
2014
4th Overall Tour de Bretagne
5th Overall Okolo Jižních Čech
2016
1st Stage 1 Tour de Savoie Mont-Blanc
7th Overall Kreiz Breizh Elites
2017
4th Grand Prix des Marbriers
8th Overall Kreiz Breizh Elites

1st Stage 3

8th Paris–Chauny
2018
5th Tour de Vendée
2019
6th Overall CRO Race
8th Memorial Marco Pantani
2020
2nd Overall Tour de Savoie Mont-Blanc
2nd Overall Giro della Friuli Venezia Giulia
4th Overall International Tour of Rhodes
7th Overall Tour de Hongrie
2021 (1 pro win)
1st Overall Oberösterreichrundfahrt

1st Stage 3

1st Mountains classification, Tour Alsace
4th Overall Tour de Savoie Mont-Blanc

1st Stage 4

6th Overall Sibiu Cycling Tour

1st Stage 2

10th Overall CRO Race
2022 (1)
1st Mountains classification, CRO Race
1st Stage 4 Sazka Tour
2nd Overall Tour of Bulgaria

1st Mountains classification

2nd Overall Oberösterreich Rundfahrt
2nd Overall In the Steps of Romans
3rd Overall South Aegean Tour
3rd Overall International Tour of Rhodes
2023 (1)
Settimana Internazionale di Coppi e Bartali

1st Mountains classification
1st Stage 4

1st Mountains classification, Giro di Sicilia
7th Overall La Tropicale Amissa Bongo
8th Overall Tour of Turkey
2024
1st Stage 2 Tour de Bretagne
7th Overall Tour du Limousin

1st Mountains classification

2025 (2)
1st Overall GP Beiras e Serra da Estrela

1st Stage 3

1st Overall Troféu Joaquim Agostinho
1st Overall Grande Prémio Anicolor

1st Stage 3

1st Clássica Aldeias do Xisto
2nd Overall Volta a Portugal
3rd Overall Vuelta a Asturias
9th Overall Volta ao Alentejo
2026 (5)
1st Overall Volta a Portugal

1st Mountains classification
1st Stages 4 & 9

1st Overall Grande Prémio Anicolor

1st Stage 3

2nd Overall Volta ao Alentejo

1st Mountains classification
1st Stage 4

2nd Overall Grande Prémio Internacional Beiras e Serra da Estrela
3rd Overall Grande Prémio O Jogo
