= Niklas Eg =

Danish racing cyclist

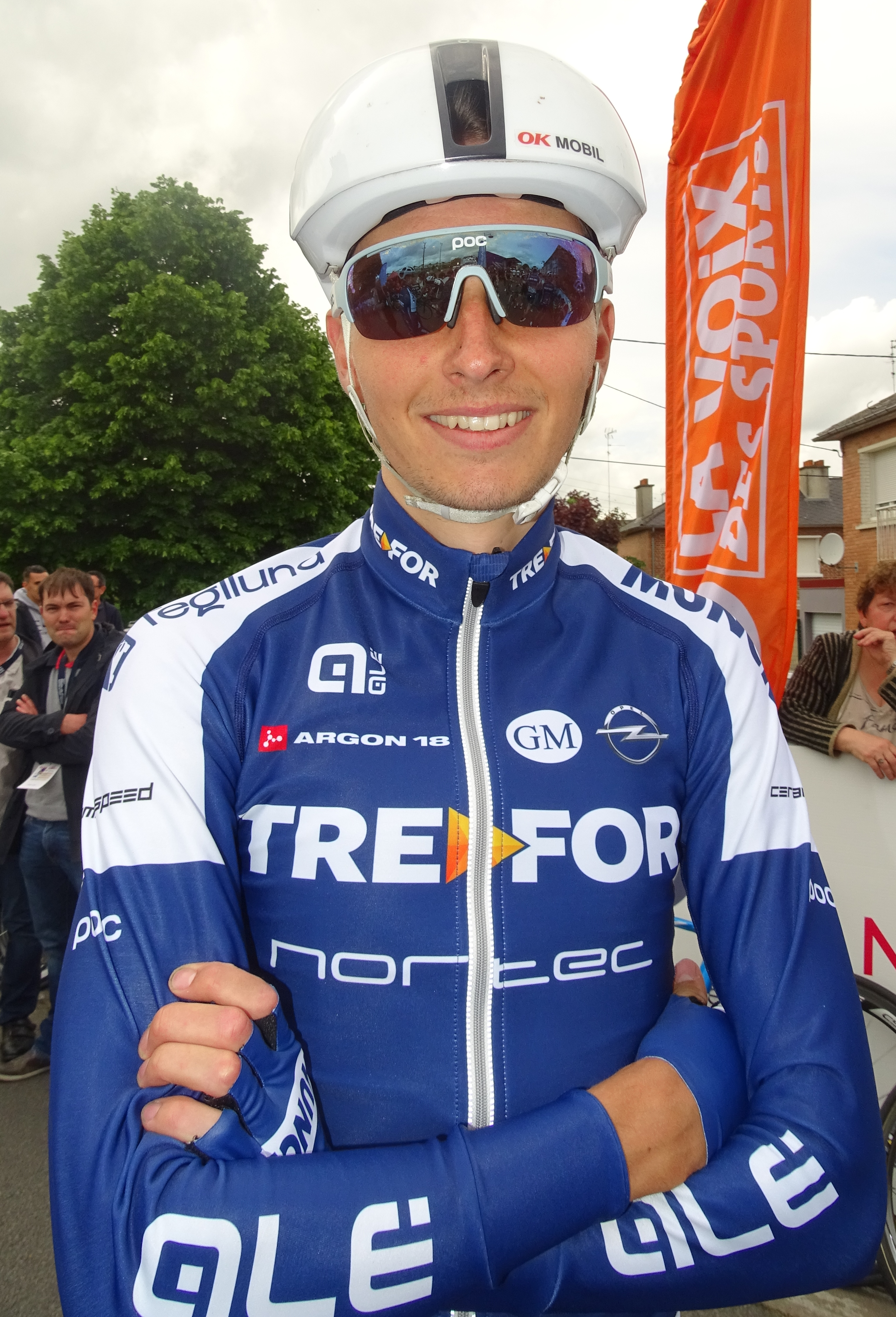
- Eg in 2016

Personal information
- Born: 6 January 1995 (age 31) Kibæk, Denmark
- Height: 1.83 m (6 ft 0 in)
- Weight: 60 kg (132 lb)

Cycling career
- Sport: Cycling
- Current team: Retired
- Discipline: Road
- Role: Rider
- Rider type: Climber

Professional teams
- 2016–2017: Team TreFor
- 2018–2021: Trek–Segafredo
- 2022–2023: Uno-X Pro Cycling Team

Niklas Eg (born 6 January 1995) is a Danish former cyclist, who competed as a professional from 2016 to 2023.

== Career ==
E.g. was born in Kibæk.

=== Trek–Segafredo (2018–2021) ===
After signing an initial two-year contract with the team in September 2017, E.g. opened the 2018 season in Australia, and was close to the top 10 in the Herald Sun Tour, where he finished 12th overall. E.g. finished 7th on the last stage of the Abu Dhabi Tour to Jebel Hafeet, while at the Tour of Croatia, E.g. finished 5th overall. He started the Giro d'Italia, his first Grand Tour, finishing 93rd.

In August 2019, he was named in the startlist for the 2019 Vuelta a España. In August 2020, he was named in the startlist for the 2020 Tour de France.

=== Uno-X (2022–2023) ===
E.g. joined UCI ProTeam Uno-X Pro Cycling Team for the 2022 season. He retired at the end of 2023 due to heart issues.

== Major results ==
2017
2nd Overall Kreiz Breizh Elites
2nd Overall Grand Prix Priessnitz spa
3rd Overall Tour de l'Avenir
4th Overall Giro della Valle d'Aosta
6th Sundvolden GP
2018
5th Overall Tour of Croatia
2019
5th Overall Tour of Utah
2021
9th Overall Giro di Sicilia
2022
6th Overall Tour de Hongrie

=== Grand Tour classification results timeline ===
| Grand Tour | 2018 | 2019 | 2020 | 2021 | 2022 |
|---|---|---|---|---|---|
| Giro d'Italia | 93 | — | — | — | — |
| Tour de France | — | — | 51 | — | — |
| Vuelta a España | — | 37 | 59 | — | — |

Legend
| — | Did not compete |
| DNF | Did not finish |
