= Cycling at the 2018 Mediterranean Games =

- Venue: Vila-seca Urban Circuit
- Dates: 27, 30 June

The cycling competitions at the 2018 Mediterranean Games took place on 27 and 30 June at the Vila-seca Urban Circuit.

Athletes competed in four events.

== Medal summary ==
=== Medalists ===
Event	Gold		Silver		Bronze	
Men's road race	Jalel Duranti; Italy	3h 43' 50"	Filippo Tagliani; Italy	s.t.	Rafael Silva; Portugal	s.t.
Men's time trial	Edoardo Affini; Italy	30' 31.12"	Domingos Gonçalves; Portugal	+5.90"	Izidor Penko; Slovenia	+22.54"
Women's road race	Elisa Longo Borghini; Italy	2h 35' 29"	Ane Santesteban; Spain	+3' 18"	Erica Magnaldi; Italy	+3' 18"
Women's time trial	Elena Cecchini; Italy	24' 15.67"	Lisa Morzenti; Italy	+46.69"	Antri Christoforou; Cyprus	+56.43"

=== Medal table ===
* Host nation (Spain)

Rank	Nation	Gold	Silver	Bronze	Total
1	Italy	4	2	1	7
2	Portugal	0	1	1	2
3	Spain*	0	1	0	1
4	Cyprus	0	0	1	1
4	Slovenia	0	0	1	1
Totals (5 entries)		4	4	4	12
