= Francisco Campos (cyclist) =

Portuguese cyclist

Personal information
- Full name: Francisco Joaquim Brito Campos
- Born: 10 October 1997 (age 29) Penafiel, Portugal
- Height: 1.69 m (5 ft 7 in)
- Weight: 60 kg (132 lb)

Cycling career
- Sport: Cycling
- Current team: Team Tavira / Crédito Agrícola
- Discipline: Road
- Role: Rider

Amateur teams
- 2016: Moreira Congelados–Feria–KTM
- 2023: Fonte Nova–Felgueiras

Professional teams
- 2018: Miranda–Mortágua
- 2019–2021: W52 / FC Porto
- 2022: Efapel Cycling
- 2023: BAI–Sicasal–Petro de Luanda
- 2023–: AP Hotels & Resorts–Tavira–SC Farense

Francisco Joaquim Brito Campos (born 10 October 1997) is a Portuguese cyclist, who currently rides for UCI Continental team Team Tavira / Crédito Agrícola.

== Major results ==
2017
1st Road race, National Under-23 Road Championships
1st Prova de Abertura
1st Points classification, Volta a Portugal do Futuro
2018
1st Stages 3 & 4 Volta a Portugal do Futuro
2019
1st Grande Prémio Anicolor
1st Stage 2 Tour de l'Espoir
5th Road race, National Under-23 Road Championships
2020
3rd Road race, National Road Championships
2021
1st Grande Prémio Anicolor
4th Road race, National Road Championships
2023
1st Stage 1 Grande Prémio O Jogo
3rd Clássica da Arrábida
2024
1st Clássica da Primavera
1st Clássica Viana do Castelo
1st Stage 2 Grande Prémio Anicolor
7th Clássica da Arrábida
2025
1st Stage 9 Grande Prémio Jornal de Notícias
2026 (1 pro win)
1st Stage 1 Volta a Portugal
