= Diego López (cyclist) =

Spanish cyclist

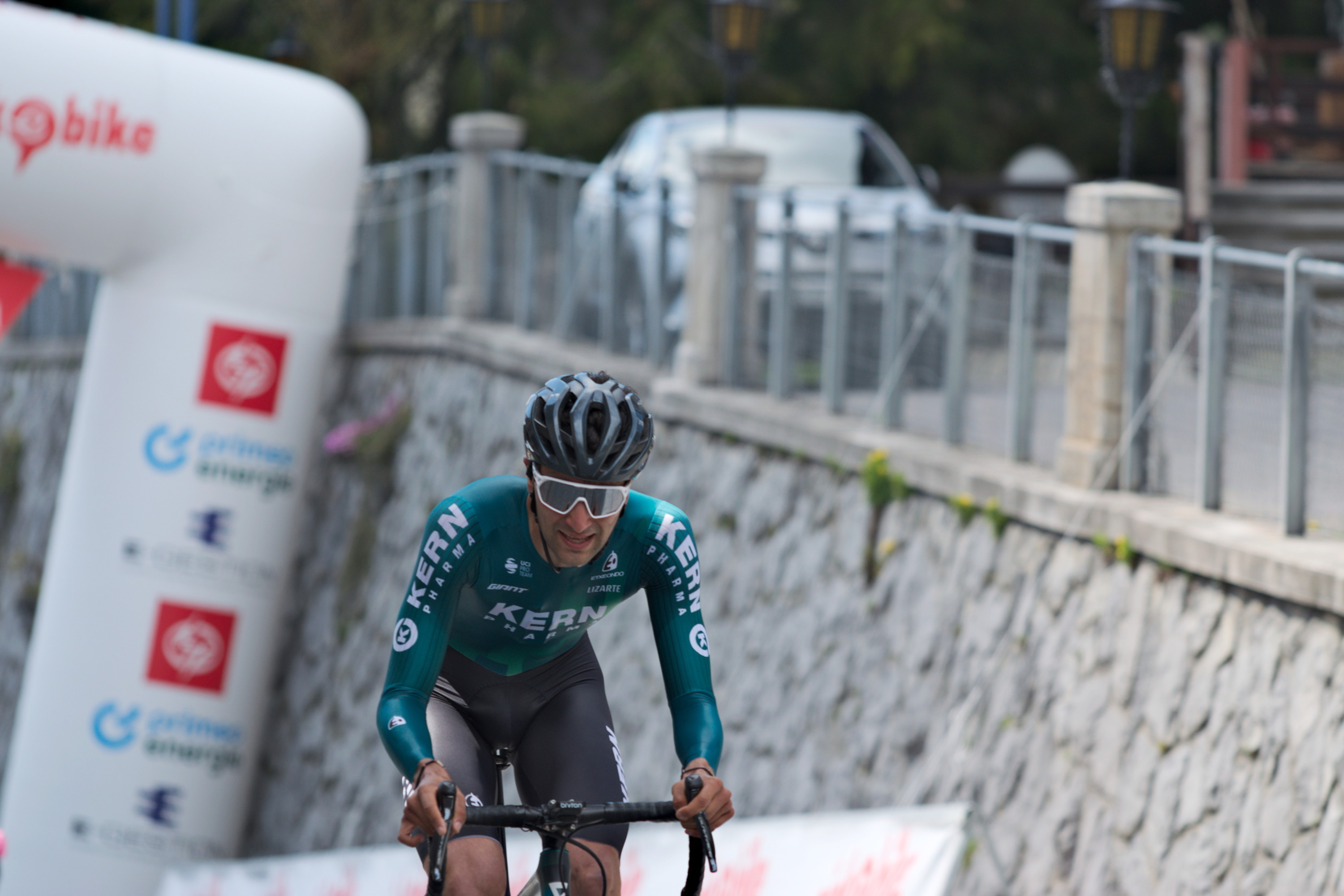
- López at 2022 Tour de Romandie

Personal information
- Full name: Diego López Fuentes
- Born: 9 December 1997 (age 28) Estella-Lizarra, Spain
- Height: 1.88 m (6 ft 2 in)
- Weight: 70 kg (154 lb)

Cycling career
- Sport: Cycling
- Current team: Retired
- Discipline: Road
- Role: Rider
- Rider type: Time trialist

Amateur team
- 2016–2017: Fundación Euskadi–EDP

Professional teams
- 2018–2020: Fundación Euskadi
- 2021–2022: Equipo Kern Pharma

Diego López Fuentes (born 9 December 1997) is a Spanish former cyclist, who competed as a professional from 2018 to 2022.
