= Izidor Penko =

Slovenian cyclist (born 1996)

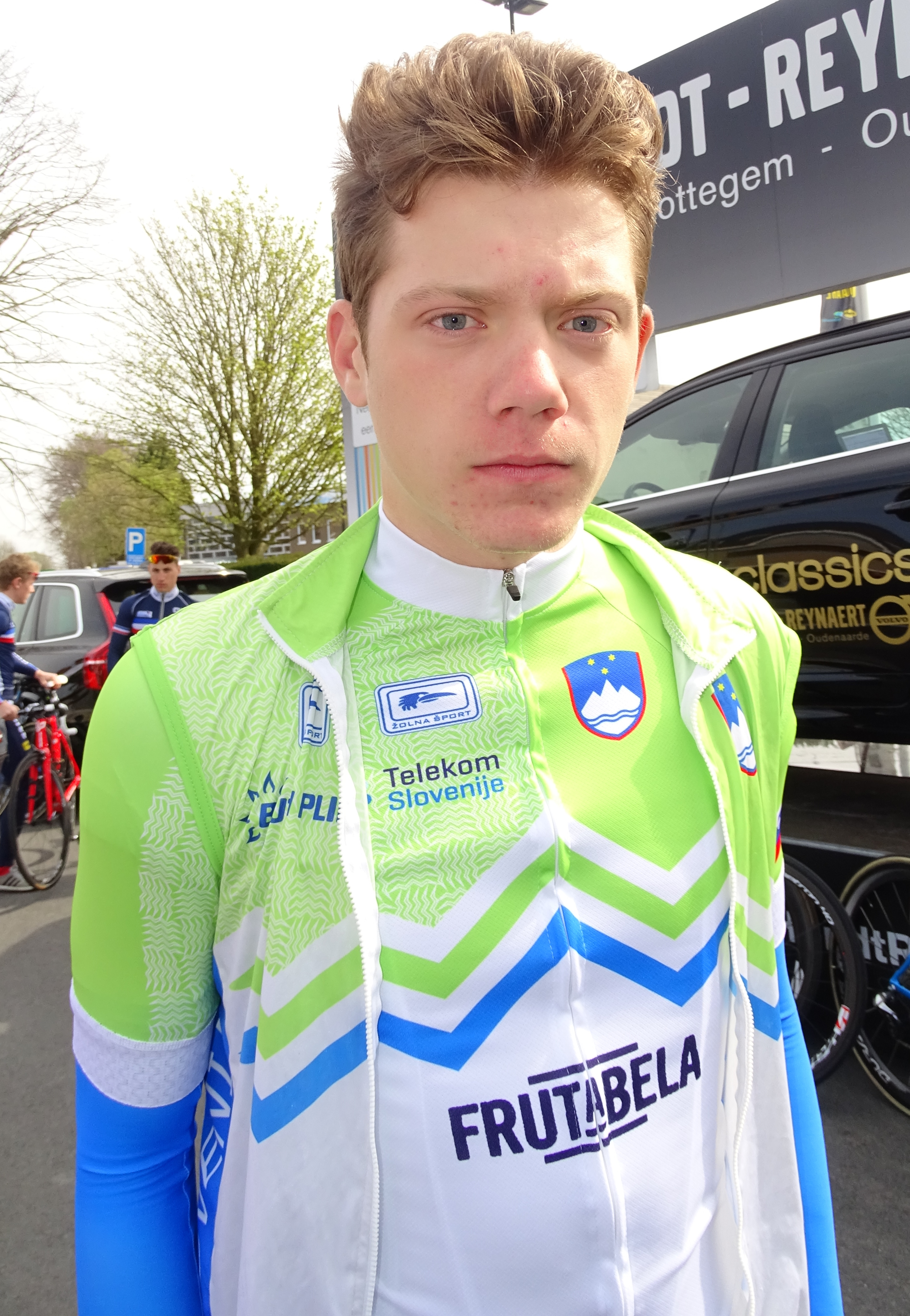
- Penko in 2016

Personal information
- Full name: Izidor Penko
- Born: 2 July 1996 (age 30) Ljubljana, Slovenia

Cycling career
- Sport: Cycling
- Current team: Retired
- Discipline: Road
- Role: Rider

Professional team
- 2015–2018: Radenska–Ljubljana

Izidor Penko (born 25 July 1996 in Ljubljana) is a Slovenian former professional cyclist, who rode professionally between 2015 and 2018, entirely for the Ljubljana Gusto Xaurum team.

== Major results ==
2014
1st Trofeo Emilio Paganessi
National Junior Road Championships

2nd Road race
2nd Time trial

6th Road race, UCI Junior Road World Championships
2016
3rd Time trial, National Under-23 Road Championships
2017
1st Time trial, National Under-23 Road Championships
3rd Time trial, National Road Championships
2018
2nd Time trial, UEC European Under-23 Road Championships
3rd Time trial, Mediterranean Games
3rd Time trial, National Road Championships
