= Cylance Pro Cycling (men's team) =

Cycling team

Team information
- UCI code: CPC
- Registered: Puerto Rico (2014–2015); United States (2015–2017)
- Founded: 2014
- Disbanded: 2017
- Discipline: Road
- Status: UCI Continental

Team name history
- 2014 2015 2016 2017: InCycle–Predator Components; InCycle–Cannondale; Cylance–Incycle; Cylance Pro Cycling

Cylance Pro Cycling was an American UCI Continental cycling team established in 2014.

The team disbanded at the end of the 2017 season.

== Team roster ==
Rider	Date of birth
Andrés Miguel Díaz (COL)	January 20, 1984 (age 42)
Orlando Garibay (MEX)	October 13, 1993 (age 32)
Samuel Grove (USA)	January 9, 1993 (age 33)
Scott Law (AUS)	March 9, 1991 (age 35)
Bryan Lewis (USA)	August 31, 1990 (age 36)

Rider	Date of birth
Eric Marcotte (USA)	February 8, 1980 (age 46)
Karl Menzies (AUS)	June 17, 1977 (age 49)
Kyle Murphy (USA)	October 5, 1991 (age 34)
Justin Williams (USA)	May 26, 1989 (age 37)
Cameron Wurf (AUS)	August 3, 1983 (age 43)

== Major results ==
2014
1st Puerto Rico National Road Race Championships, Efren Ortega
