= Jalel Duranti =

Italian cyclist (born 1994)

Personal information
- Born: 4 April 1994 (age 32) Soncino, Lombardy, Italy

Cycling career
- Sport: Cycling
- Current team: Retired
- Discipline: Road
- Role: Rider
- Rider type: Sprinter

Amateur teams
- 2014: Fiorenzo Magni–US Boltiere–VCB
- 2015: Overall Cycling Team
- 2016–2017: Viris Maserati–Sisal–Matchpoint
- 2018: Petroli Firenze Hoppla Maserati

Professional team
- 2019: Team Colpack
Medal record
Representing Italy
Men's road bicycle racing
Mediterranean Games
Gold medal – first place	2018 Tarragona	Road race

Jalel Duranti (born 4 April 1994) is an Italian former road cyclist. He most notably won the road race at the 2018 Mediterranean Games.

== Major results ==
2012
6th Trofeo comune di Vertova
2018
1st Road race, Mediterranean Games
2nd Gran Premio San Giuseppe
6th Coppa della Pace
2019
1st Stages 2 & 6 Tour de Nouvelle-Calédonie
