= Abner González =

Puerto Rican cyclist

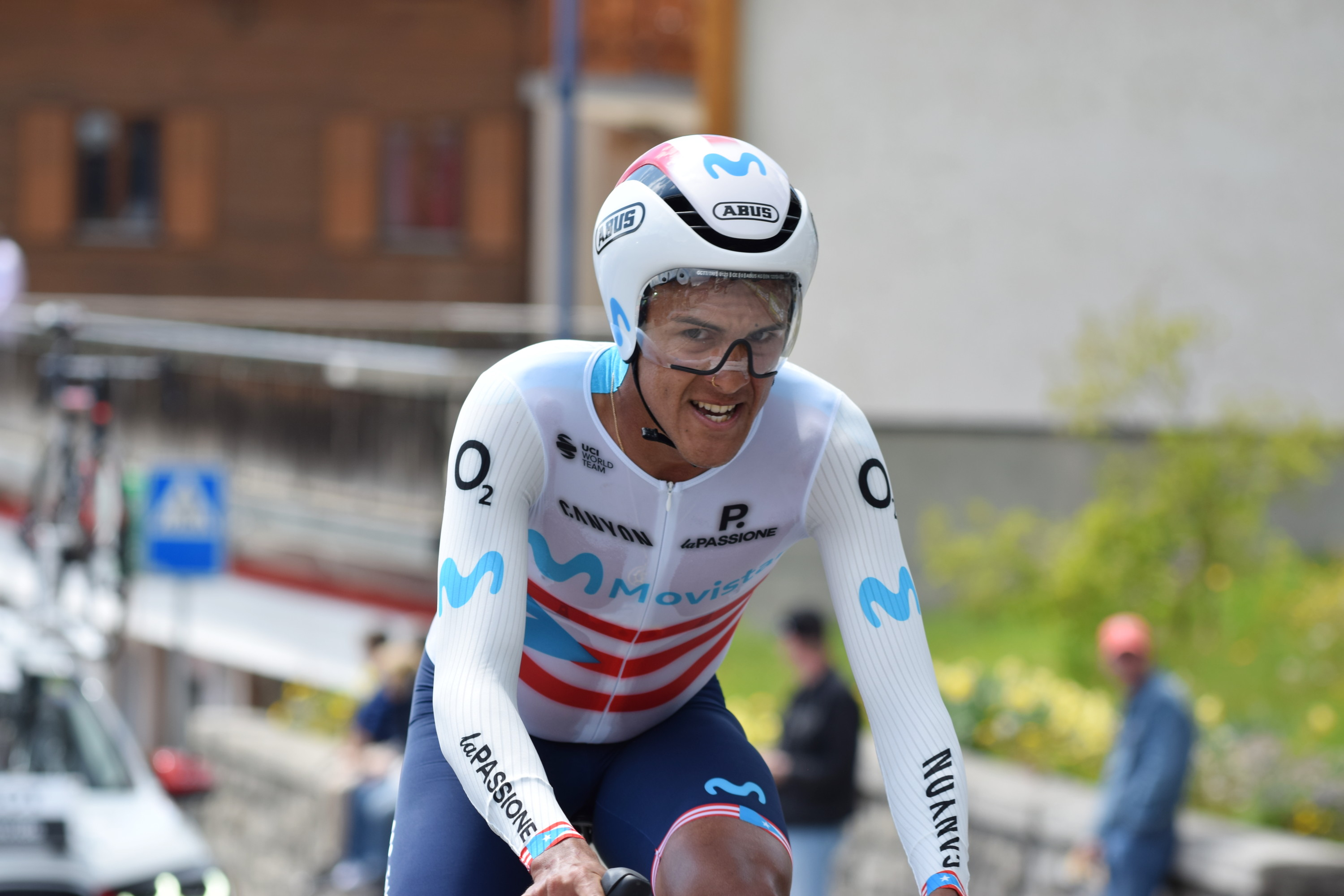
- González on Stage 5 of the 2022 Tour de Romandie

Personal information
- Full name: Abner Alejandro González Rivera
- Nickname: Speedy González
- Born: 9 October 2000 (age 26) Moca, Puerto Rico
- Height: 5 ft 9 in (175 cm)
- Weight: 132 lb (60 kg)

Cycling career
- Sport: Cycling
- Current team: Feirense–Beeceler
- Discipline: Road
- Role: Rider
- Rider type: Climber

Amateur teams
- 2017: Ciudad de Lugo
- 2018: Bathco
- 2019: SoCalCycling.com
- 2019: Pacific Premier Bank
- 2020: Telcom–On Clima–Osés Const

Professional teams
- 2019: Inteja Imca–Ridea
- 2021–2023: Movistar Team
- 2024: Efapel Cycling
- 2025: Caja Rural–Seguros RGA
- 2026–: Feirense–Beeceler

Abner González Rivera (born 9 October 2000) is a Puerto Rican cyclist, who currently rides for the team of Feirense–Beeceler. He previously spent three seasons with UCI WorldTeam Movistar Team.

== Major results ==
2017
3rd Overall Vuelta al Besaya

1st Stage 4

2019
National Road Championships

1st Road race
1st Under-23 road race

2nd Time trial, Caribbean Road Championships
2020
1st Clásica Ciudad de Torredonjimeno
2021
National Road Championships

1st Road race
1st Time trial

4th Circuito de Getxo
5th Vuelta a Castilla y León
6th Overall Volta a Portugal

1st Young rider classification

2022
National Road Championships

1st Road race
2nd Time trial

2023
5th Road race, Central American and Caribbean Games
2024 (1 pro win)
3rd Overall Volta a Portugal

1st Stage 9

3rd Overall Volta ao Alentejo
5th Overall Troféu Joaquim Agostinho
