= Segurilla =

Coordinates: 40°01′N 4°51′W

- municipality
- Flag Coat of arms

- Country: Spain
- Autonomous community: Castile-La Mancha
- Province: Toledo
- Municipality: Segurilla

Area
  - Total: 22 km^{2} (8.5 sq mi)
- Elevation: 560 m (1,840 ft)

Population (2025-01-01)
  - Total: 1,412
  - Density: 64/km^{2} (170/sq mi)
- Time zone: UTC+1 (CET)
  - Summer (DST): UTC+2 (CEST)

Segurilla is a municipality located in the province of Toledo, Castile-La Mancha, Spain. According to the 2017 census (INE), the municipality has a population of 1,345 inhabitants. It is located 9 km north of Talavera de la Reina, the second largest town of the Province of Toledo
