= Electro Hiper Europa =

Colombian cycling team

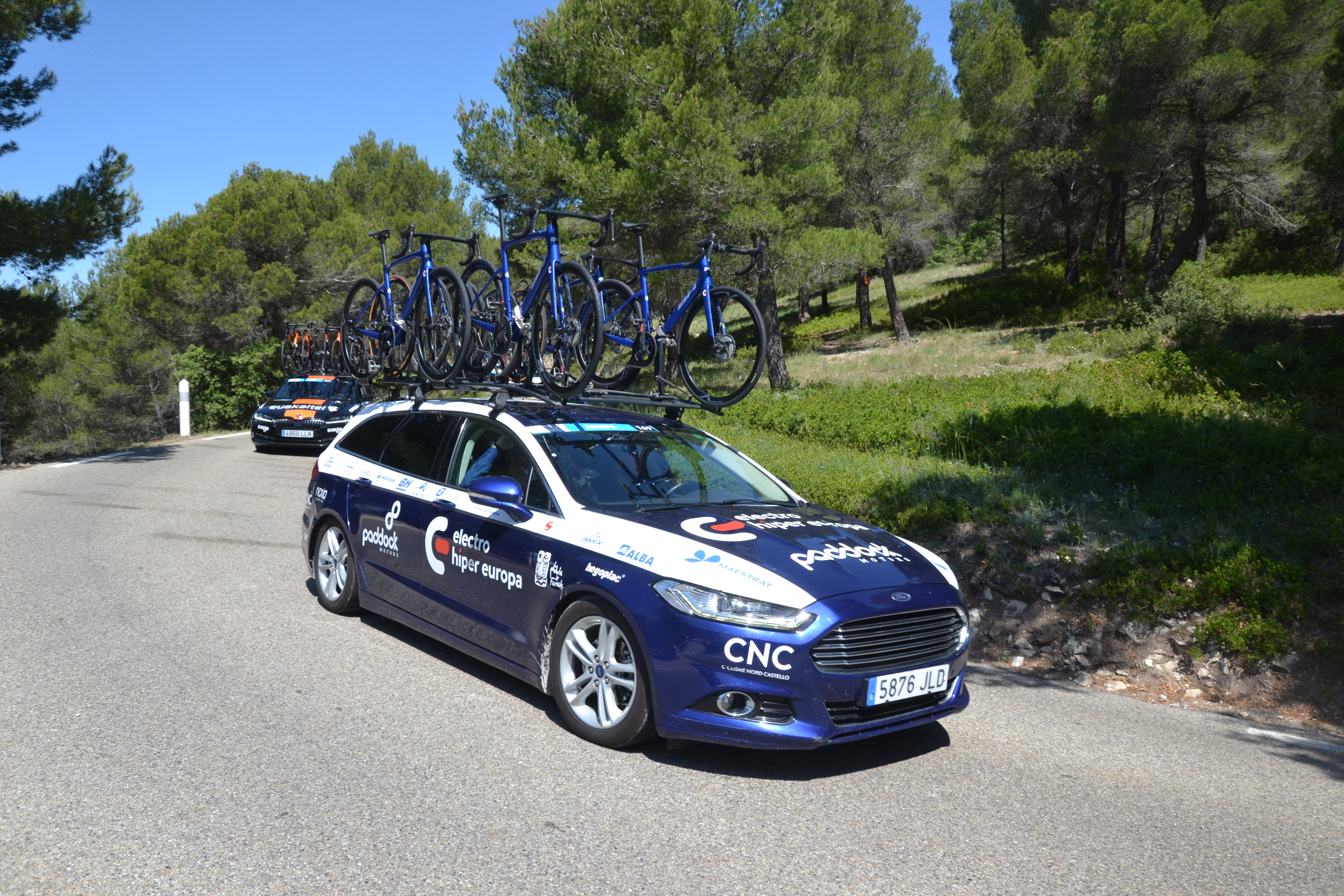

Team information
- UCI code: EHE
- Registered: Argentina (2021); Colombia (2022); Spain (2023)
- Founded: 2021
- Disbanded: 2023
- Discipline: Road
- Status: UCI Continental

Key personnel
- General manager: Gustavo Mario Toledo
- Team manager: Rafael Casero Moreno

Team name history
- 2021 2022 2023: Electro Hiper Europa; Electro Hiper Europa–Caldas; Electro Hiper Europa

Electro Hiper Europa was a Spanish UCI Continental cycling team founded in 2021 and disbanded in 2023.

== Team roster ==
As of 26 May 2023.

Rider	Date of birth
Joan Bennassar (ESP)	30 May 1999 (age 27)
Xavier Cañellas (ESP)	16 March 1997 (age 29)
Mateu Estelrich (ESP)	2 August 2001 (age 25)
Jose Luis Faura (ESP)	15 September 2000 (age 25)
José María García (ESP)	17 November 1998 (age 27)
Lucas Lopes (POR)	10 April 2003 (age 23)

Rider	Date of birth
José María Martín (ESP)	4 February 2001 (age 25)
Víctor Martínez (ESP)	28 January 1985 (age 41)
Alex Molenaar (NED)	13 July 1999 (age 27)
Alejandro Ropero (ESP)	17 April 1998 (age 28)
Andrew Vollmer (USA)	5 September 2000 (age 26)

== Major wins ==
2021
Stage 3 Tour de Bretagne, Óscar Pelegrí
