= Scott McGill (cyclist) =

American cyclist (born 1998)

Personal information
- Born: September 20, 1998 (age 28) Fallston, Maryland

Cycling career
- Sport: Cycling
- Current team: Modern Adventure Pro Cycling
- Disciplines: Road; Cyclo-cross
- Role: Rider
- Rider type: Sprinter

Amateur teams
- 2017: Goma Dakwerken–VDB Steenhouwerij
- 2018–2019: Gateway Harley-Davidson Trek

Professional teams
- 2019–2021: Aevolo
- 2022: Wildlife Generation Pro Cycling
- 2023: Human Powered Health
- 2024–2025: Project Echelon Racing
- 2026–: Modern Adventure Pro Cycling

Scott McGill (born September 20, 1998) is an American cyclist, who currently rides for UCI ProTeam Modern Adventure Pro Cycling.

He took his first major professional win at the 2022 Volta a Portugal, where he won the first and sixth stages.

== Major results ==
=== Road ===
2019
2nd Overall Tour of Tobago

1st Stages 2 & 5

2022
1st Bucks County Classic
1st Wilmington Grand Prix
Volta a Portugal

1st Points classification
1st Stages 1 & 6

3rd National Criterium Championships
6th Overall Joe Martin Stage Race
2023
7th Maryland Cycling Classic
8th Paris–Chauny
2024
1st Stage 2 Tour of the Gila
1st Stage 4 Redlands Bicycle Classic
1st Stage 1 International Tour of Rhodes
2nd Gastown Grand Prix
3rd National Criterium Championships
3rd Crystal Cup
6th Overall Volta ao Alentejo
7th International Rhodes Grand Prix
10th Trofeo Palma
2025
1st Stage 5 Redlands Bicycle Classic
2nd National Criterium Championships

=== Cyclo-cross ===
2021–2022
2nd North Carolina Grand Prix Day 2
New England Cyclocross Series

3rd The Northampton International

4th Pan American Championships
2022–2023
2nd Major Taylor Cross Cup Day 2
3rd Major Taylor Cross Cup Day 1
