= Jesús del Pino =

Spanish bicycle racer

Personal information
- Full name: Jesús del Pino Corrochano
- Born: 9 September 1990 (age 36) Segurilla, Spain

Cycling career
- Sport: Cycling
- Current team: Aviludo–Louletano–Loulé
- Discipline: Road
- Role: Rider

Amateur teams
- 2009–2010: Sanse–Spiuk
- 2011–2012: Caja Rural Amateur
- 2012: Caja Rural (stagiaire)

Professional teams
- 2013–2016: Burgos BH–Castilla y Leon
- 2017–2018: Efapel
- 2019: Vito–Feirense–PNB
- 2020–: Aviludo–Louletano

Jesús del Pino Corrochano (born 9 September 1990 in Segurilla) is a Spanish cyclist, who currently rides for UCI Continental team Aviludo–Louletano–Loulé.

== Major results ==
2009
3rd Overall Vuelta a la Comunidad de Madrid U23
2013
1st Stage 2 Tour des Pays de Savoie
2014
3rd Overall Tour des Pays de Savoie
6th Overall Vuelta a Castilla y León
2017
1st Overall Volta Internacional Cova da Beira
9th Overall Vuelta a Castilla y León
2019
2nd Prueba Villafranca de Ordizia
2022
8th Overall Volta a Portugal
2023
10th Overall Volta a Portugal
2024
7th Overall Volta a Portugal
