= Henrique Casimiro =

Swiss-born Portuguese cyclist

Personal information
- Full name: Henrique Madeira Casimiro
- Born: 22 April 1986 (age 40) Aarau, Switzerland
- Height: 1.75 m (5 ft 9 in)
- Weight: 62 kg (137 lb)

Cycling career
- Sport: Cycling
- Current team: Efapel Cycling
- Discipline: Road
- Role: Rider

Professional teams
- 2009–2015: Palmeiras–Resort–Tavira
- 2016–2019: Efapel
- 2020–2021: Kelly–InOutBuild–UDO
- 2022–: Efapel Cycling

Henrique Madeira Casimiro (born 22 April 1986) is a Portuguese cyclist, who currently rides for UCI Continental team Efapel Cycling.

== Major results ==
2013
3rd Overall Troféu Joaquim Agostinho
2014
8th Time trial, National Road Championships
2016
8th Overall GP Beiras e Serra da Estrela
8th Overall Troféu Joaquim Agostinho
7th Overall Volta a Portugal
8th Overall Volta Internacional Cova da Beira
2017
2nd Overall Vuelta a Castilla y León
8th Overall Volta a Portugal
2018
2nd Overall Troféu Joaquim Agostinho

1st Points classification
1st Stage 4

3rd Road race, National Road Championships
4th Overall GP Beiras e Serra da Estrela
10th Overall Volta a Portugal
2019
1st Overall Troféu Joaquim Agostinho

1st Points classification
1st Mountains classification

3rd Clássica Aldeias do Xisto
9th Overall GP Beiras e Serra da Estrela

1st Mountains classification

10th Overall Volta a Portugal
2020
7th Road race, National Road Championships
2021
10th Overall Volta a Portugal
2023
4th Overall GP Beiras e Serra da Estrela
4th Overall Grande Prémio O Jogo
7th Overall Grande Prémio Abimota
