= Joaquim Silva (cyclist) =

Portuguese cyclist

Personal information
- Full name: Joaquim Ricardo Soares Silva
- Born: 19 March 1992 (age 34) Penafiel, Portugal
- Height: 1.85 m (6 ft 1 in)
- Weight: 67 kg (148 lb)

Cycling career
- Sport: Cycling
- Current team: Efapel Cycling
- Discipline: Road
- Role: Rider

Amateur teams
- 2002–2010: Associação Desportiva Recreativa Ases Penafiel
- 2011–2014: Mortágua–Basi

Professional teams
- 2015–2017: W52 / FC Porto / Mestre da Cor
- 2018: Caja Rural–Seguros RGA
- 2019: W52 / FC Porto
- 2020–2021: Miranda–Mortágua
- 2022–: Efapel Cycling

Joaquim Ricardo Soares Silva (born 19 March 1992) is a Portuguese cyclist, who currently rides for UCI Continental team Efapel Cycling.

== Major results ==
2014
1st Road race, National Under-23 Road Championships
2nd Overall Volta a Portugal do Futuro
8th Overall Tour de l'Avenir
2017
8th Overall Vuelta a Castilla y León
9th Overall Vuelta a Asturias
2018
7th Overall GP Beiras e Serra da Estrela
8th Overall Vuelta a Asturias
2019
7th Overall Tour of Qinghai Lake
10th Overall Tour de Luxembourg
2021
7th Overall Trofeu Joaquim Agostinho
8th Overall Volta ao Alentejo
2022
9th Overall Vuelta a Asturias
9th Overall Volta ao Alentejo
2023
8th Overall Vuelta a Asturias
9th Overall O Gran Camiño
