= Tiago Antunes =

Portuguese cyclist

Personal information
- Full name: Tiago Gomes Antunes
- Born: 9 April 1997 (age 29) Bombarral, Portugal
- Height: 1.71 m (5 ft 7 in)
- Weight: 55 kg (121 lb)

Cycling career
- Sport: Cycling
- Current team: Efapel Cycling
- Discipline: Road
- Role: Rider

Amateur teams
- 2016–2017: Sicasal–Constantinos SA–UDO
- 2017–2018: Aldro Cycling Team

Professional teams
- 2018: SEG Racing Academy (stagiaire)
- 2019: SEG Racing Academy
- 2020: Efapel
- 2021: Tavfer–Measindot–Mortágua
- 2022–: Efapel Cycling
Medal record
Men's road cycling
Representing Portugal
Mediterranean Games
Gold medal – first place	2026 Taranto	Time trial
Silver medal – second place	2026 Taranto	Road race

Tiago Gomes Antunes (born 9 April 1997) is a Portuguese cyclist, who currently rides for UCI Continental team Efapel Cycling.

== Major results ==
2014
2nd Time trial, National Junior Road Championships
2017
National Under-23 Road Championships

4th Time trial
5th Road race

9th Overall Grand Prix Priessnitz spa
10th Overall Ronde de l'Isard
10th Overall Volta a Portugal do Futuro
2018
National Under-23 Road Championships

3rd Time trial
5th Road race

2021
2nd Clássica Aldeias do Xisto
3rd Overall Grande Prémio Anicolor
4th Clássica da Arrábida
6th Overall Troféu Joaquim Agostinho
2022
1st Stage 2 Grande Prémio O Jogo
2nd Road race, National Road Championships
3rd Overall Troféu Joaquim Agostinho

1st Prologue

2023
7th Overall Troféu Joaquim Agostinho
2024
2nd Overall Grande Prémio Jornal de Notícias
6th Overall Troféu Joaquim Agostinho
2025
National Road Championships

4th Road race
3rd Time trial

5th Overall Volta a Portugal
6th Overall Troféu Joaquim Agostinho
8th Overall Volta ao Alentejo
2026 (1 pro win)
1st Overall Volta ao Alentejo
2nd Overall Grande Prémio Anicolor

1st Stage 1

2nd Overall Grande Prémio O Jogo
3rd Troféu Internacional da Arrábida
