= GP Beiras e Serra da Estrela =

Volta Internacional Cova da Beira
Race details
- Date: May
- Region: Portugal
- Discipline: Road race
- Competition: UCI Europe Tour
- Type: Single day race
- Web site: www.racetime.pt/gpbeirasserraestrela

History
- First edition: 2016
- Editions: 8 (as of 2026)
- First winner: Joni Brandão (POR)
- Most wins: Artem Nych (2 wins)
- Most recent: Jesús David Peña (COL)

The Volta Internacional Cova da Beira (officially: Grande Prémio Internacional Beiras e Serra da Estrela) is a professional cycling race held annually in Portugal. It is part of the UCI Europe Tour as a category 2.2 event. Prior to 2023, the race was held as a category 2.1 event. It is officially named after the administrative division of Portugal known as Beiras e Serra da Estrela.

== Winners ==
| Year | Country | Rider | Team |
|---|---|---|---|
| 2016 | Portugal | Joni Brandão | Efapel |
| 2017 | Spain | Jesús del Pino | Efapel |
| 2018 | Russia | Dmitry Strakhov | Lokosphinx |
| 2019 | Colombia | Edwin Ávila | Israel Cycling Academy |
| 2020 | No race due to COVID-19 pandemic | | |
| 2021– 2022 | No race | | |
| 2023 | | Artem Nych | Glassdrive–Q8–Anicolor |
| 2024 | | Artem Nych | Sabgal–Anicolor |
| 2025 | France | Alexis Guérin | Anicolor / Tien 21 |
| 2026 | Colombia | Jesús David Peña | Efapel Cycling |
