= Rafael Silva (cyclist) =

Portuguese cyclist

Personal information
- Full name: Rafael Jorge Magalhães Silva
- Born: 14 November 1990 (age 35) Vila Nova de Gaia, Portugal
- Height: 1.78 m (5 ft 10 in)
- Weight: 65 kg (143 lb)

Cycling career
- Sport: Cycling
- Discipline: Road
- Role: Rider

Amateur teams
- 2009: Santa Maria da Feira–E-Leclerc–Moreira Congelados
- 2010–2012: Liberty Seguros–Santa Maria da Feira

Professional teams
- 2013: LA Alumínios–Antarte
- 2014–2020: Efapel–Glassdrive
- 2021: Antarte–Feirense
- 2022–2023: Efapel Cycling
Medal record
Representing Portugal
Men's road bicycle racing
Mediterranean Games
Bronze medal – third place	2018 Tarragona	Road race

Rafael Jorge Magalhães Silva (born 14 November 1990) is a Portuguese cyclist, who last rode for UCI Continental team Efapel Cycling.

== Major results ==
2012
1st Overall Volta a Portugal do Futuro

1st Stages 3 & 5

1st Gran Premio Ciudad de Vigo I
2nd Gran Premio Ciudad de Vigo II
3rd Road race, National Under-23 Road Championships
2013
1st Stages 1 & 3 Volta a Portugal do Futuro
2015
8th Overall GP Liberty Seguros
2016
5th Overall Volta ao Alentejo
2018
3rd Road race, Mediterranean Games
7th Overall Grande Prémio de Portugal N2
2019
1st Overall Volta a Albergaria
2020
10th Prueba Villafranca-Ordiziako Klasika
10th Overall Troféu Joaquim Agostinho
2022
9th Clássica da Arrábida
2023
1st Stage 3 Grande Prémio O Jogo
9th Clássica da Arrábida
