= Efapel Cycling =

Portuguese cycling team

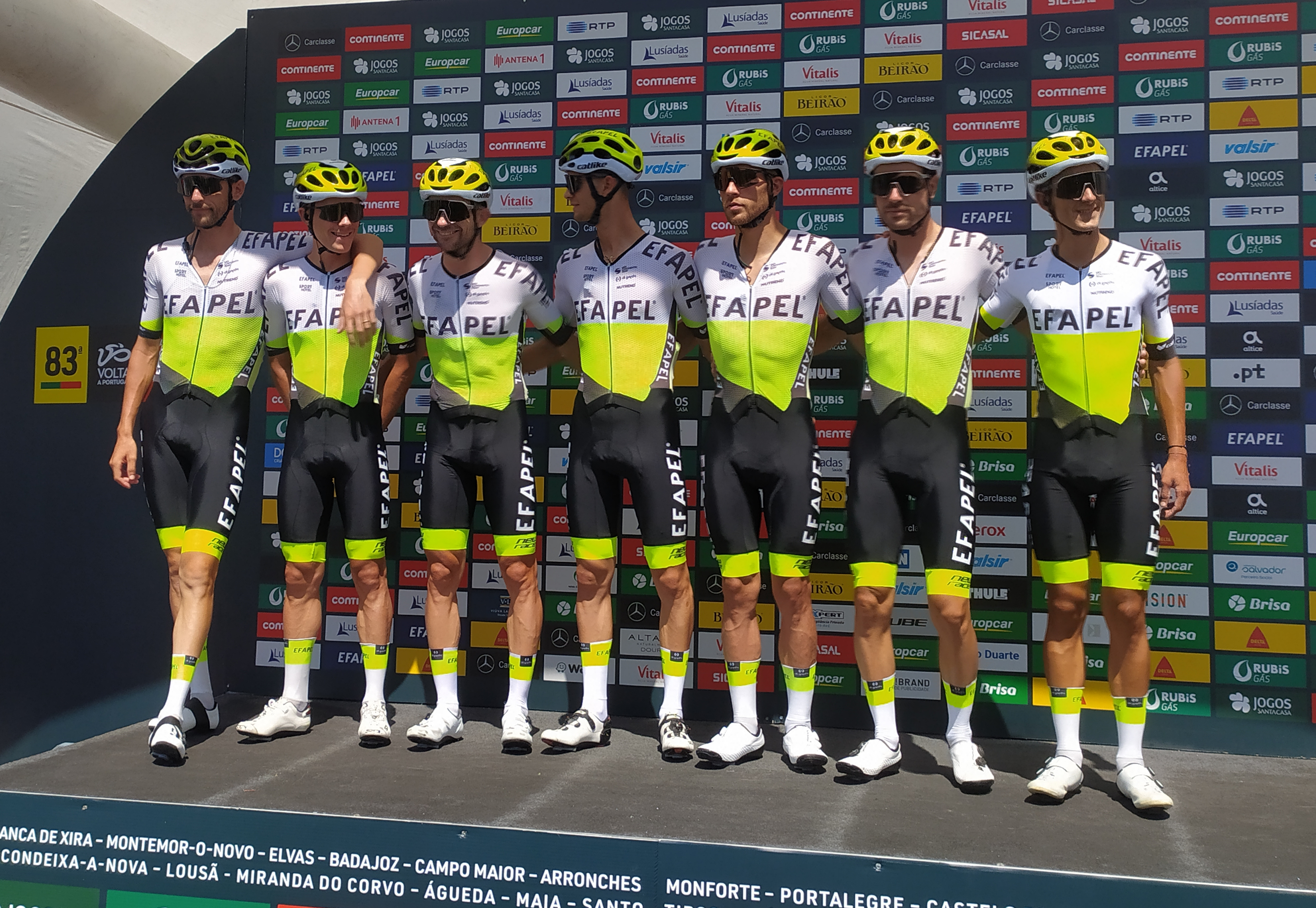

Team information
- UCI code: EFL
- Registered: Portugal
- Founded: 2022
- Discipline: Road
- Status: UCI Continental
- Bicycles: Orbea
- Website: Team home page

Key personnel
- General manager: José Azevedo
- Team manager: Hélder Miranda

Team name history
- 2022–: Efapel Cycling

Efapel Cycling (UCI team code: EFL) is a Portuguese UCI Continental cycling team established in 2022.

== Team roster ==
As of 12 February 2024.

Rider	Date of birth
Tiago Antunes (POR)	9 April 1997 (age 29)
Henrique Casimiro (POR)	22 April 1986 (age 40)
António Ferreira (POR)	3 April 2000 (age 26)
Abner González (PUR)	9 October 2000 (age 25)
Aleksandr Grigorev (Note: As of 1 March 2022, the UCI announced that cyclists from Russia and Belarus would no longer compete under the name or flag of those respective countries due to the Russian invasion of Ukraine.) (blank)	21 March 1992 (age 34)
Viacheslav Ivanov (blank)	1 August 2002 (age 24)

Rider	Date of birth
Santiago Mesa (COL)	11 November 1997 (age 28)
Pedro Pinto (POR)	5 November 2000 (age 25)
Pedro Pinto (POR)	23 June 2004 (age 22)
Joaquim Silva (POR)	19 March 1992 (age 34)
Keegan Swirbul (USA)	2 September 1995 (age 31)

== Major wins ==
2022
Prologue Troféu Joaquim Agostinho, Tiago Antunes
2026
1st overall Volta ao Alentejo, Tiago Antunes

== National & World champions ==
2022
Portugal U23 Time Trial, Pedro Andrade
