= 2018 Troféu Joaquim Agostinho =

2018 UCI Europe Tour

Race details
- Dates: July 12–15, 2018
- Stages: 4
- Distance: 486 km (302.0 mi)
- Winning time: 12h 43' 38"

Results
Jersey awarded to the overall winner	Winner	José Fernandes (POR)	(W52 / FC Porto)
	Second	Henrique Casimiro (POR)	(Efapel)
	Third	Joni Brandão (POR)	(Sporting / Tavira)
Jersey awarded to the points classification winner	Points	Henrique Casimiro (POR)	(Efapel)
Jersey awarded to the mountains classification winner	Mountains	David de la Fuente (ESP)	(Aviludo–Louletano)
Jersey awarded to the youth classification winner	Youth	José Fernandes (POR)	(W52 / FC Porto)
Jersey awarded to the combination classification winner	Combination	David de la Fuente (ESP)	(Aviludo–Louletano)
Jersey awarded to the sprints classification winner	Sprints	Gotzon Udondo (ESP)	(Euskadi–Murias)
	Team	W52 / FC Porto	

The 2018 Troféu Joaquim Agostinho–GP Internacional Torres Vedras was four-stage men's road cycling stage race that took place in the Centro region of Portugal between 12 and 15 July 2018. It was the 41st edition of the Troféu Joaquim Agostinho and was rated as a 2.2 event as part of the UCI Europe Tour.

== Teams ==
The 20 teams invited to the race were:

UCI Professional Continental teams

- Euskadi–Murias
- Burgos BH
- Caja Rural–Seguros RGA

UCI Continental teams

- W52 / FC Porto
- Aviludo–Louletano
- Efapel
- Rádio Popular–Boavista
- Liberty Seguros–Carglass
- Miranda–Mortágua
- Sporting / Tavira
- Vito–Feirense–BlackJack
- LA Alumínios
- Fundación Euskadi
- Alecto Cycling Team

Under 23 teams

- Sicasal–Constantinos–Delta Cafés
- Bai–Sicasal–Petro de Luanda
- FGP–Cube–Bombarral
- Fortuna–Maia
- Aldro
- ACDC Trofa–Trofense

== Stages ==
Stage characteristics and winners
Stage	Date	Course	Distance	Type	Winner
P	12 July	Turcifal	8 km (5 mi)	Individual time trial	Rafael Reis
1	13 July	Ventosa to Sobral de Monte Agraço	162 km (101 mi)	Hilly stage	Cyril Barthe
2	14 July	Serra d'El-Rei to Torres Vedras	144 km (89 mi)	Hilly stage	Óscar Hernández
3	15 July	Cadaval to Alto de Montejunto	172 km (107 mi)	Mountain stage	Henrique Casimiro
	Total		486 km (302 mi)		

== Classification leadership ==
Classification leadership by stage
Stage	Winner	General classification	Points classification	Mountains classification	Sprints classification	Young rider classification	Combination classification	Team classification
P	Rafael Reis	Rafael Reis	no award	no award	no award	José Fernandes	no award	W52 / FC Porto
1	Cyril Barthe	José Fernandes	Cyril Barthe	Tiago Ferreira	Gotzon Udondo	José Fernandes	Tiago Ferreira	W52 / FC Porto
2	Óscar Hernández	Óscar Hernández	Óscar Hernández	Tiago Ferreira	Gotzon Udondo	José Fernandes	David de la Fuente	W52 / FC Porto
3	Henrique Casimiro	José Fernandes	Henrique Casimiro	David de la Fuente	Gotzon Udondo	José Fernandes	David de la Fuente	W52 / FC Porto
Final		José Fernandes	Henrique Casimiro	David de la Fuente	Gotzon Udondo	José Fernandes	David de la Fuente	W52 / FC Porto

- In stage two, Nicholas Schultz, who was second in the young rider classification, wore the orange jersey, because first placed José Fernandes wore the yellow jersey as leader of the general classification.
- In stage two, Nícolas Sessler, who was third in the combination classification, wore the black jersey, because first placed Tiago Ferreira wore the blue jersey as leader of the mountains classification and second placed Gotzon Udondo wore the white jersey as leader of the sprints classification.
- In stage three, Cyril Barthe, who was second in the points classification, wore the grey jersey, because first placed Óscar Hernández wore the yellow jersey as leader of the general classification.

== Final standings ==
Legend
General classification	Denotes the winner of the general classification	Points classification	Denotes the leader of the points classification
Mountains classification	Denotes the leader of the mountains classification	Young rider classification	Denotes the winner of the young rider classification
Sprints classification	Denotes the leader of the sprints classification	Combination classification	Denotes the leader of the combination classification

=== General classification ===
Final general classification (1–10)
Rank	Rider	Team	Time
1	José Fernandes (POR)	W52 / FC Porto	12h 43' 38"
2	Henrique Casimiro (POR)	Efapel	+ 4"
3	Joni Brandão (POR)	Sporting / Tavira	+ 5"
4	António Carvalho (POR)	W52 / FC Porto	+ 36"
5	João Benta (POR)	Rádio Popular–Boavista	+ 1' 12"
6	José Mendes (POR)	Burgos BH	+ 1' 16"
7	Frederico Figueiredo (POR)	Sporting / Tavira	+ 1' 33"
8	Óscar Hernández (ESP)	Aviludo–Louletano	+ 1' 38"
9	Jesús del Pino (ESP)	Efapel	+ 1' 46"
10	Cyril Barthe (FRA)	Euskadi–Murias	+ 2' 02"

=== Points classification ===
Final points classification (1–10)
Rank	Rider	Team	Points
1	Henrique Casimiro (POR)	Efapel	25
2	Óscar Hernández (ESP)	Aviludo–Louletano	25
3	Cyril Barthe (FRA)	Euskadi–Murias	25
4	Fabricio Ferrari (URU)	Caja Rural–Seguros RGA	21
5	Joni Brandão (POR)	Sporting / Tavira	20
6	António Barbio (POR)	Miranda–Mortágua	18
7	José Fernandes (POR)	W52 / FC Porto	16
8	Ricardo Mestre (POR)	W52 / FC Porto	16
9	Mikel Alonso (ESP)	Fundación Euskadi	16
10	António Carvalho (POR)	W52 / FC Porto	13

=== Mountains classification ===
Final mountains classification (1–10)
Rank	Rider	Team	Points
1	David de la Fuente (ESP)	Aviludo–Louletano	30
2	Henrique Casimiro (POR)	Efapel	30
3	Joni Brandão (POR)	Sporting / Tavira	30
4	Tiago Ferreira (POR)	W52 / FC Porto	24
5	António Carvalho (POR)	W52 / FC Porto	22
6	José Fernandes (POR)	W52 / FC Porto	18
7	João Benta (POR)	Rádio Popular–Boavista	16
8	Folkert Oostra (NED)	Alecto Cycling Team	12
9	Gotzon Udondo (ESP)	Euskadi–Murias	9
10	Abe Celi (NED)	Alecto Cycling Team	8

=== Sprints classification ===
Final mountains classification (1–10)
Rank	Rider	Team	Points
1	Gotzon Udondo (ESP)	Euskadi–Murias	19
2	Paulo Silva (POR)	LA Alumínios	16
3	Abe Celi (NED)	Alecto Cycling Team	8
4	Marcos Jurado (ESP)	Efapel	6
5	David de la Fuente (ESP)	Aviludo–Louletano	6
6	Marvin Sheulen (POR)	Sicasal–Constantinos–Delta Cafés	6
7	Tiago Ferreira (POR)	W52 / FC Porto	6
8	Nícolas Sessler (BRA)	Burgos BH	4
9	Paulo Silva (POR)	Fortuna–Maia	4
10	Mauricio Moreira (URU)	Caja Rural–Seguros RGA	3

=== Young rider classification ===
Final young rider classification (1–10)
Rank	Rider	Team	Time
1	José Fernandes (POR)	W52 / FC Porto	12h 43' 38"
2	Cyril Barthe (FRA)	Euskadi–Murias	+ 2' 02"
3	Gonçalo Carvalho (POR)	Miranda–Mortágua	+ 2' 49"
4	Marco Doets (NED)	Alecto Cycling Team	+ 3' 16"
5	Tiago Antunes (POR)	Aldro	+ 3' 44"
6	Nicholas Schultz (AUS)	Caja Rural–Seguros RGA	+ 6' 59"
7	Julen Irizar (ESP)	Euskadi–Murias	+ 7' 26"
8	Juan López-Cózar (ESP)	Fundación Euskadi	+ 8' 04"
9	Daniel Zea (COL)	Aldro	+ 8' 21"
10	Diogo Duarte (POR)	Sicasal–Constantinos–Delta Cafés	+ 10' 47"

=== Combination classification ===
Final combination classification (1–10)
Rank	Rider	Team	Points
1	David de la Fuente (ESP)	Aviludo–Louletano	33
2	Jesús del Pino (ESP)	Efapel	36
3	Fabricio Ferrari (URU)	Caja Rural–Seguros RGA	50
4	Sergio Rodríguez (ESP)	Euskadi–Murias	68
5	Guillaume Almeida (POR)	Fortuna–Maia	71
6	Abe Celi (NED)	Alecto Cycling Team	72
7	Gotzon Udondo (ESP)	Euskadi–Murias	79
8	Tiago Ferreira (POR)	W52 / FC Porto	84
9	Nícolas Sessler (BRA)	Burgos BH	90
10	Marvin Sheulen (POR)	Sicasal–Constantinos–Delta Cafés	102

=== Team classification ===
Final team classification (1–10)
Rank	Team	Time
1	W52 / FC Porto	38h 13' 27"
2	Sporting / Tavira	+ 4' 29"
3	Efapel	+ 5' 25"
4	Aviludo–Louletano	+ 6' 29"
5	Caja Rural–Seguros RGA	+ 9' 14"
6	Burgos BH	+ 10' 25"
7	Fundación Euskadi	+ 11' 29"
8	Miranda–Mortágua	+ 13' 39"
9	Euskadi–Murias	+ 14' 10"
10	Aldro	+ 17' 34"
