= 2020 Volta a Portugal =

2020 UCI Europe Tour

Race details
- Dates: 27 September – 5 October 2020
- Stages: 8
- Distance: 1,183.9 km (735.6 mi)
- Winning time: 29h 28' 57"

Results
Jersey awarded to the overall winner	Winner	Amaro Antunes (POR)	(W52 / FC Porto)
	Second	Gustavo César (ESP)	(W52 / FC Porto)
	Third	Frederico Figueiredo (POR)	(Atum General / Tavira / Maria Nova Hotel)
Jersey awarded to the points classification winner	Points	Luís Gomes (POR)	(Kelly / Simoldes / UDO)
Jersey awarded to the mountains classification winner	Mountains	Hugo Nunes (POR)	(Rádio Popular–Boavista)
Jersey awarded to the youth classification winner	Youth	Simon Carr (GBR)	(Nippo–Delko–One Provence)
	Team	W52 / FC Porto	

The 2020 Volta a Portugal em Bicicleta Edição Especial was the 82nd edition of the Volta a Portugal road cycling stage race and was held from 27 September to 5 October 2020. Originally, it was due to take place from 29 July to August 8, but it was postponed due to the COVID-19 pandemic. It was a 2.1-rated event on the 2020 UCI Europe Tour and covered 1,183.9 km (735.6 mi) over eight stages.

== Teams ==
Five UCI ProTeams and the nine Portuguese UCI Continental teams made up the fourteen teams of seven riders each that participated in the race. 89 of the 98 riders in the race finished.

UCI ProTeams

- Arkéa–Samsic
- Burgos BH
- Caja Rural–Seguros RGA
- Nippo–Delko–One Provence
- Rally Cycling

UCI Continental Teams

- Atum General / Tavira / Maria Nova Hotel
- Aviludo–Louletano
- Efapel
- Feirense
- Kelly / Simoldes / UDO
- LA Alumínios / LA Sport
- Miranda–Mortágua
- Rádio Popular–Boavista
- W52 / FC Porto

== Schedule ==
Stage characteristics and winners
Stage	Date	Course	Distance	Type	Winner
P	27 September	Fafe	7 km (4.3 mi)	Individual time trial	Gustavo César (ESP)
1	28 September	Montalegre to Viana do Castelo (Alto de Santa Luzia)	180 km (110 mi)	Hilly stage	Luís Gomes (POR)
2	29 September	Paredes to Alto da Senhora da Graça	167 km (104 mi)	Mountain stage	Amaro Antunes (POR)
3	30 September	Felgueiras to Viseu	171.9 km (106.8 mi)	Hilly stage	Oier Lazkano (ESP)
4	1 October	Guarda to Covilhã (Torre)	148 km (92 mi)	Mountain stage	Joni Brandão (POR)
5	2 October	Oliveira do Hospital to Águeda	176.3 km (109.5 mi)	Hilly stage	Daniel McLay (GBR)
6	3 October	Caldas da Rainha to Torres Vedras	155 km (96 mi)	Flat stage	Daniel McLay (GBR)
7	4 October	Loures to Setúbal	161 km (100 mi)	Hilly stage	António Carvalho (POR)
8	5 October	Lisbon to Lisbon	17.7 km (11.0 mi)	Individual time trial	Gustavo César (ESP)
Total			1,183.9 km (735.6 mi)		

== Stages ==
=== Prologue ===
27 September 2020 — Fafe, 7 km (4.3 mi) (ITT)

Prologue Result
Rank	Rider	Team	Time
1	Gustavo César (ESP)	W52 / FC Porto	9' 39"
2	Rafael Reis (POR)	Feirense	+ 1"
3	Daniel Mestre (POR)	W52 / FC Porto	+ 1"
4	Daniel Freitas (POR)	Miranda–Mortágua	+ 4"
5	António Carvalho (POR)	Efapel	+ 6"
6	Joni Brandão (POR)	Efapel	+ 7"
7	Samuel Caldeira (POR)	W52 / FC Porto	+ 8"
8	João Rodrigues (POR)	W52 / FC Porto	+ 8"
9	Christophe Noppe (BEL)	Arkéa–Samsic	+ 10"
10	Vicente García de Mateos (ESP)	Aviludo–Louletano	+ 12"

General classification after Prologue
Rank	Rider	Team	Time
1	Gustavo César (ESP)	W52 / FC Porto	9' 39"
2	Rafael Reis (POR)	Feirense	+ 1"
3	Daniel Mestre (POR)	W52 / FC Porto	+ 1"
4	Daniel Freitas (POR)	Miranda–Mortágua	+ 4"
5	António Carvalho (POR)	Efapel	+ 6"
6	Joni Brandão (POR)	Efapel	+ 7"
7	Samuel Caldeira (POR)	W52 / FC Porto	+ 8"
8	João Rodrigues (POR)	W52 / FC Porto	+ 8"
9	Christophe Noppe (BEL)	Arkéa–Samsic	+ 10"
10	Vicente García de Mateos (ESP)	Aviludo–Louletano	+ 12"

=== Stage 1 ===
28 September 2020 — Montalegre to Viana do Castelo (Alto de Santa Luzia), 180 km (110 mi)

Stage 1 Result
Rank	Rider	Team	Time
1	Luís Gomes (POR)	Kelly / Simoldes / UDO	4h 24' 41"
2	Daniel Mestre (POR)	W52 / FC Porto	+ 0"
3	Gustavo César (ESP)	W52 / FC Porto	+ 0"
4	António Carvalho (POR)	Efapel	+ 0"
5	João Rodrigues (POR)	W52 / FC Porto	+ 0"
6	Vicente García de Mateos (ESP)	Aviludo–Louletano	+ 0"
7	Daniel Freitas (POR)	Miranda–Mortágua	+ 0"
8	Mauro Finetto (ITA)	Nippo–Delko–One Provence	+ 0"
9	Diego Rubio (ESP)	Burgos BH	+ 0"
10	Amaro Antunes (POR)	W52 / FC Porto	+ 0"

General classification after Stage 1
Rank	Rider	Team	Time
1	Gustavo César (ESP)	W52 / FC Porto	4h 34' 20"
2	Daniel Mestre (POR)	W52 / FC Porto	+ 1"
3	Daniel Freitas (POR)	Miranda–Mortágua	+ 4"
4	António Carvalho (POR)	Efapel	+ 6"
5	Joni Brandão (POR)	Efapel	+ 7"
6	João Rodrigues (POR)	W52 / FC Porto	+ 8"
7	Rafael Reis (POR)	Feirense	+ 11"
8	Vicente García de Mateos (ESP)	Aviludo–Louletano	+ 12"
9	Gavin Mannion (USA)	Rally Cycling	+ 14"
10	Luís Gomes (POR)	Kelly / Simoldes / UDO	+ 17"

=== Stage 2 ===
29 September 2020 — Paredes to Alto da Senhora da Graça, 167 km (104 mi)

Stage 2 Result
Rank	Rider	Team	Time
1	Amaro Antunes (POR)	W52 / FC Porto	4h 25' 50"
2	Frederico Figueiredo (POR)	Atum General / Tavira / Maria Nova Hotel	+ 22"
3	João Benta (POR)	Rádio Popular–Boavista	+ 1' 13"
4	Simon Carr (GBR)	Nippo–Delko–One Provence	+ 1' 20"
5	Gustavo César (ESP)	W52 / FC Porto	+ 1' 45"
6	Vicente García de Mateos (ESP)	Aviludo–Louletano	+ 1' 45"
7	Ricardo Vilela (POR)	Burgos BH	+ 1' 45"
8	Joni Brandão (POR)	Efapel	+ 1' 45"
9	Cristián Rodríguez (ESP)	Caja Rural–Seguros RGA	+ 1' 49"
10	Alejandro Marque (ESP)	Atum General / Tavira / Maria Nova Hotel	+ 1' 49"

General classification after Stage 2
Rank	Rider	Team	Time
1	Amaro Antunes (POR)	W52 / FC Porto	9h 00' 42"
2	Frederico Figueiredo (POR)	Atum General / Tavira / Maria Nova Hotel	+ 13"
3	Gustavo César (ESP)	W52 / FC Porto	+ 1' 13"
4	João Benta (POR)	Rádio Popular–Boavista	+ 1' 17"
5	Joni Brandão (POR)	Efapel	+ 1' 20"
6	Daniel Freitas (POR)	Miranda–Mortágua	+ 1' 25"
7	Vicente García de Mateos (ESP)	Aviludo–Louletano	+ 1' 25"
8	João Rodrigues (POR)	W52 / FC Porto	+ 1' 29"
9	Alejandro Marque (ESP)	Atum General / Tavira / Maria Nova Hotel	+ 1' 38"
10	Simon Carr (GBR)	Nippo–Delko–One Provence	+ 1' 38"

=== Stage 3 ===
30 September 2020 — Felgueiras to Viseu, 171.9 km (106.8 mi)

Stage 3 Result
Rank	Rider	Team	Time
1	Oier Lazkano (ESP)	Caja Rural–Seguros RGA	4h 13' 15"
2	Daniel McLay (GBR)	Arkéa–Samsic	+ 15"
3	Leangel Linarez (VEN)	Miranda–Mortágua	+ 15"
4	Luís Gomes (POR)	Kelly / Simoldes / UDO	+ 15"
5	Mauro Finetto (ITA)	Nippo–Delko–One Provence	+ 15"
6	Daniel Freitas (POR)	Miranda–Mortágua	+ 15"
7	André Ramalho (POR)	LA Alumínios / LA Sport	+ 15"
9	Sergey Shilov (RUS)	Aviludo–Louletano	+ 15"
9	Alejandro Marque (ESP)	Atum General / Tavira / Maria Nova Hotel	+ 15"
10	José Manuel Díaz (ESP)	Nippo–Delko–One Provence	+ 15"

General classification after Stage 3
Rank	Rider	Team	Time
1	Amaro Antunes (POR)	W52 / FC Porto	13h 14' 12"
2	Frederico Figueiredo (POR)	Atum General / Tavira / Maria Nova Hotel	+ 13"
3	Gustavo César (ESP)	W52 / FC Porto	+ 1' 13"
4	João Benta (POR)	Rádio Popular–Boavista	+ 1' 17"
5	Joni Brandão (POR)	Efapel	+ 1' 20"
6	Daniel Freitas (POR)	Miranda–Mortágua	+ 1' 25"
7	Vicente García de Mateos (ESP)	Aviludo–Louletano	+ 1' 25"
8	João Rodrigues (POR)	W52 / FC Porto	+ 1' 29"
9	Alejandro Marque (ESP)	Atum General / Tavira / Maria Nova Hotel	+ 1' 38"
10	Ricardo Vilela (POR)	Burgos BH	+ 1' 45"

=== Stage 4 ===
1 October 2020 — Guarda to Covilhã (Torre), 148 km (92 mi)

Stage 4 Result
Rank	Rider	Team	Time
1	Joni Brandão (POR)	Efapel	4h 19' 02"
2	Frederico Figueiredo (POR)	Atum General / Tavira / Maria Nova Hotel	+ 3"
3	Amaro Antunes (POR)	W52 / FC Porto	+ 3"
4	Gustavo César (ESP)	W52 / FC Porto	+ 3"
5	António Carvalho (POR)	Efapel	+ 11"
6	João Benta (POR)	Rádio Popular–Boavista	+ 13"
7	Delio Fernández (ESP)	Nippo–Delko–One Provence	+ 17"
8	Luís Fernandes (POR)	Rádio Popular–Boavista	+ 24"
9	João Rodrigues (POR)	W52 / FC Porto	+ 34"
10	Cristián Rodríguez (ESP)	Caja Rural–Seguros RGA	+ 34"

General classification after Stage 4
Rank	Rider	Team	Time
1	Amaro Antunes (POR)	W52 / FC Porto	17h 33' 17"
2	Frederico Figueiredo (POR)	Atum General / Tavira / Maria Nova Hotel	+ 13"
3	Gustavo César (ESP)	W52 / FC Porto	+ 1' 13"
4	Joni Brandão (POR)	Efapel	+ 1' 17"
5	João Benta (POR)	Rádio Popular–Boavista	+ 1' 27"
6	António Carvalho (POR)	Efapel	+ 1' 55"
7	João Rodrigues (POR)	W52 / FC Porto	+ 2' 00"
8	Alejandro Marque (ESP)	Atum General / Tavira / Maria Nova Hotel	+ 2' 15"
9	Delio Fernández (ESP)	Nippo–Delko–One Provence	+ 2' 31"
10	Cristián Rodríguez (ESP)	Caja Rural–Seguros RGA	+ 2' 43"

=== Stage 5 ===
2 October 2020 — Oliveira do Hospital to Águeda, 176.3 km (109.5 mi)

Stage 5 Result
Rank	Rider	Team	Time
1	Daniel McLay (GBR)	Arkéa–Samsic	4h 14' 46"
2	Leangel Linarez (VEN)	Miranda–Mortágua	+ 0"
3	Riccardo Minali (ITA)	Nippo–Delko–One Provence	+ 0"
4	Luís Gomes (POR)	Kelly / Simoldes / UDO	+ 0"
5	Daniel Freitas (POR)	Miranda–Mortágua	+ 0"
6	David González (ESP)	Burgos BH	+ 0"
7	Rafael Silva (POR)	Efapel	+ 0"
8	Cesar Martingil (POR)	Atum General / Tavira / Maria Nova Hotel	+ 0"
9	Amaro Antunes (POR)	W52 / FC Porto	+ 0"
10	Delio Fernández (ESP)	Nippo–Delko–One Provence	+ 0"

General classification after Stage 5
Rank	Rider	Team	Time
1	Amaro Antunes (POR)	W52 / FC Porto	21h 48' 03"
2	Frederico Figueiredo (POR)	Atum General / Tavira / Maria Nova Hotel	+ 13"
3	Gustavo César (ESP)	W52 / FC Porto	+ 1' 13"
4	João Benta (POR)	Rádio Popular–Boavista	+ 1' 27"
5	Joni Brandão (POR)	Efapel	+ 1' 37"
6	João Rodrigues (POR)	W52 / FC Porto	+ 2' 00"
7	Alejandro Marque (ESP)	Atum General / Tavira / Maria Nova Hotel	+ 2' 15"
8	António Carvalho (POR)	Efapel	+ 2' 15"
9	Delio Fernández (ESP)	Nippo–Delko–One Provence	+ 2' 31"
10	Cristián Rodríguez (ESP)	Caja Rural–Seguros RGA	+ 2' 43"

=== Stage 6 ===
3 October 2020 — Caldas da Rainha to Torres Vedras, 155 km (96 mi)

Stage 6 Result
Rank	Rider	Team	Time
1	Daniel McLay (GBR)	Arkéa–Samsic	3h 38' 04"
2	Riccardo Minali (ITA)	Nippo–Delko–One Provence	+ 0"
3	Leangel Linarez (VEN)	Miranda–Mortágua	+ 0"
4	Óscar Pelegrí (ESP)	Feirense	+ 0"
5	João Matias (POR)	Aviludo–Louletano	+ 0"
6	David González (ESP)	Burgos BH	+ 0"
7	Cesar Martingil (POR)	Atum General / Tavira / Maria Nova Hotel	+ 0"
8	Luís Gomes (POR)	Kelly / Simoldes / UDO	+ 0"
9	Matis Louvel (FRA)	Arkéa–Samsic	+ 0"
10	Daniel Freitas (POR)	Miranda–Mortágua	+ 0"

General classification after Stage 6
Rank	Rider	Team	Time
1	Amaro Antunes (POR)	W52 / FC Porto	25h 26' 07"
2	Frederico Figueiredo (POR)	Atum General / Tavira / Maria Nova Hotel	+ 13"
3	Gustavo César (ESP)	W52 / FC Porto	+ 1' 13"
4	João Benta (POR)	Rádio Popular–Boavista	+ 1' 27"
5	Joni Brandão (POR)	Efapel	+ 1' 37"
6	João Rodrigues (POR)	W52 / FC Porto	+ 2' 00"
7	Alejandro Marque (ESP)	Atum General / Tavira / Maria Nova Hotel	+ 2' 15"
8	António Carvalho (POR)	Efapel	+ 2' 15"
9	Delio Fernández (ESP)	Nippo–Delko–One Provence	+ 2' 31"
10	Cristián Rodríguez (ESP)	Caja Rural–Seguros RGA	+ 2' 43"

=== Stage 7 ===
4 October 2020 — Loures to Setúbal, 161 km (100 mi)

Stage 7 Result
Rank	Rider	Team	Time
1	António Carvalho (POR)	Efapel	3h 40' 45"
2	Luís Fernandes (POR)	Rádio Popular–Boavista	+ 0"
3	Luís Gomes (POR)	Kelly / Simoldes / UDO	+ 0"
4	Gonçalo Carvalho (POR)	Rádio Popular–Boavista	+ 0"
5	Mauro Finetto (ITA)	Nippo–Delko–One Provence	+ 0"
6	Alejandro Marque (ESP)	Atum General / Tavira / Maria Nova Hotel	+ 0"
7	João Benta (POR)	Rádio Popular–Boavista	+ 0"
8	Joni Brandão (POR)	Efapel	+ 0"
9	Amaro Antunes (POR)	W52 / FC Porto	+ 0"
10	Frederico Figueiredo (POR)	Atum General / Tavira / Maria Nova Hotel	+ 0"

General classification after Stage 7
Rank	Rider	Team	Time
1	Amaro Antunes (POR)	W52 / FC Porto	29h 06' 52"
2	Frederico Figueiredo (POR)	Atum General / Tavira / Maria Nova Hotel	+ 13"
3	Gustavo César (ESP)	W52 / FC Porto	+ 1' 13"
4	João Benta (POR)	Rádio Popular–Boavista	+ 1' 27"
5	Joni Brandão (POR)	Efapel	+ 1' 37"
6	João Rodrigues (POR)	W52 / FC Porto	+ 2' 00"
7	Alejandro Marque (ESP)	Atum General / Tavira / Maria Nova Hotel	+ 2' 15"
8	António Carvalho (POR)	Efapel	+ 2' 15"
9	Delio Fernández (ESP)	Nippo–Delko–One Provence	+ 2' 31"
10	Cristián Rodríguez (ESP)	Caja Rural–Seguros RGA	+ 2' 43"

=== Stage 8 ===
5 October 2020 — Lisbon to Lisbon, 17.7 km (11.0 mi) (ITT)

Stage 8 Result
Rank	Rider	Team	Time
1	Gustavo César (ESP)	W52 / FC Porto	21' 34"
2	António Carvalho (POR)	Efapel	+ 8"
3	Anthony Delaplace (FRA)	Arkéa–Samsic	+ 17"
4	Joni Brandão (POR)	Efapel	+ 17"
5	Daniel Mestre (POR)	W52 / FC Porto	+ 26"
6	Alejandro Marque (ESP)	Atum General / Tavira / Maria Nova Hotel	+ 27"
7	Amaro Antunes (POR)	W52 / FC Porto	+ 31"
8	João Rodrigues (POR)	W52 / FC Porto	+ 31"
9	Rafael Reis (POR)	Feirense	+ 31"
10	Samuel Caldeira (POR)	W52 / FC Porto	+ 32"

General classification after Stage 8
Rank	Rider	Team	Time
1	Amaro Antunes (POR)	W52 / FC Porto	29h 28' 57"
2	Gustavo César (ESP)	W52 / FC Porto	+ 42"
3	Frederico Figueiredo (POR)	Atum General / Tavira / Maria Nova Hotel	+ 52"
4	Joni Brandão (POR)	Efapel	+ 1' 23"
5	João Benta (POR)	Rádio Popular–Boavista	+ 1' 50"
6	António Carvalho (POR)	Efapel	+ 1' 52"
7	João Rodrigues (POR)	W52 / FC Porto	+ 2' 00"
8	Alejandro Marque (ESP)	Atum General / Tavira / Maria Nova Hotel	+ 2' 11"
9	Cristián Rodríguez (ESP)	Caja Rural–Seguros RGA	+ 3' 16"
10	Delio Fernández (ESP)	Nippo–Delko–One Provence	+ 3' 49"

== Classification leadership ==
Classification leadership by stage
Stage	Winner	General classification	Points classification	Mountains classification	Young rider classification	Team classification	Portuguese rider classification
P	Gustavo César	Gustavo César	not awarded	not awarded	Carlos Canal	W52 / FC Porto	Rafael Reis
1	Luís Gomes	Gustavo César	Daniel Mestre	Luís Gomes	Carlos Canal	W52 / FC Porto	Daniel Mestre
2	Amaro Antunes	Amaro Antunes	Amaro Antunes	Hugo Nunes	Simon Carr	W52 / FC Porto	Amaro Antunes
3	Oier Lazkano	Amaro Antunes	Luís Gomes	Hugo Nunes	Simon Carr	W52 / FC Porto	Amaro Antunes
4	Joni Brandão	Amaro Antunes	Luís Gomes	Hugo Nunes	Simon Carr	W52 / FC Porto	Amaro Antunes
5	Daniel McLay	Amaro Antunes	Luís Gomes	Hugo Nunes	Simon Carr	W52 / FC Porto	Amaro Antunes
6	Daniel McLay	Amaro Antunes	Daniel McLay	Hugo Nunes	Simon Carr	W52 / FC Porto	Amaro Antunes
7	António Carvalho	Amaro Antunes	Luís Gomes	Hugo Nunes	Simon Carr	W52 / FC Porto	Amaro Antunes
8	Gustavo César	Amaro Antunes	Luís Gomes	Hugo Nunes	Simon Carr	W52 / FC Porto	Amaro Antunes
Final		Amaro Antunes	Luís Gomes	Hugo Nunes	Simon Carr	W52 / FC Porto	Amaro Antunes

- On stage 3, Gustavo César, who was second in the points classification, wore the red jersey, because first placed Amaro Antunes wore the yellow jersey as the leader of the general classification.

== Final classification standings ==
Legend
Denotes the winner of the general classification	Denotes the winner of the mountains classification
Denotes the winner of the points classification	Denotes the winner of the young rider classification

=== General classification ===
Final general classification (1–10)
Rank	Rider	Team	Time
1	Amaro Antunes (POR)	W52 / FC Porto	29h 28' 57"
2	Gustavo César (ESP)	W52 / FC Porto	+ 42"
3	Frederico Figueiredo (POR)	Atum General / Tavira / Maria Nova Hotel	+ 52"
4	Joni Brandão (POR)	Efapel	+ 1' 23"
5	João Benta (POR)	Rádio Popular–Boavista	+ 1' 50"
6	António Carvalho (POR)	Efapel	+ 1' 52"
7	João Rodrigues (POR)	W52 / FC Porto	+ 2' 00"
8	Alejandro Marque (ESP)	Atum General / Tavira / Maria Nova Hotel	+ 2' 11"
9	Cristián Rodríguez (ESP)	Caja Rural–Seguros RGA	+ 3' 16"
10	Delio Fernández (ESP)	Nippo–Delko–One Provence	+ 3' 49"

=== Points classification ===
Final points classification (1–10)
Rank	Rider	Team	Points
1	Luís Gomes (POR)	Kelly / Simoldes / UDO	149
2	Daniel McLay (GBR)	Arkéa–Samsic	112
3	Leangel Linarez (VEN)	Miranda–Mortágua	88
4	António Carvalho (POR)	Efapel	78
5	Riccardo Minali (ITA)	Nippo–Delko–One Provence	66
6	Gustavo César (ESP)	W52 / FC Porto	56
7	Amaro Antunes (POR)	W52 / FC Porto	56
8	Oier Lazkano (ESP)	Caja Rural–Seguros RGA	54
9	Mauro Finetto (ITA)	Nippo–Delko–One Provence	47
10	Daniel Freitas (POR)	Miranda–Mortágua	46

=== Mountains classification ===
Final mountains classification (1–10)
Rank	Rider	Team	Points
1	Hugo Nunes (POR)	Rádio Popular–Boavista	55
2	Amaro Antunes (POR)	W52 / FC Porto	31
3	Frederico Figueiredo (POR)	Atum General / Tavira / Maria Nova Hotel	30
4	Joni Brandão (POR)	Efapel	20
5	Ricardo Mestre (POR)	W52 / FC Porto	20
6	Gustavo César (ESP)	W52 / FC Porto	13
7	António Carvalho (POR)	Efapel	13
8	Luís Fernandes (POR)	Rádio Popular–Boavista	11
9	Venceslau Fernandes (POR)	Kelly / Simoldes / UDO	10
10	João Benta (POR)	Rádio Popular–Boavista	10

=== Young rider classification ===
Final young rider classification (1–10)
Rank	Rider	Team	Time
1	Simon Carr (GBR)	Nippo–Delko–One Provence	29h 38' 25"
2	Matis Louvel (FRA)	Arkéa–Samsic	+ 11' 08"
3	Pedro Miguel Lopes (POR)	Kelly / Simoldes / UDO	+ 15' 52"
4	Carlos Canal (ESP)	Burgos BH	+ 42' 24"
5	Oier Lazkano (ESP)	Caja Rural–Seguros RGA	+ 1h 10' 48"
6	Fábio Costa (POR)	Kelly / Simoldes / UDO	+ 1h 21' 18"
7	Pedro Pinto (POR)	Miranda–Mortágua	+ 1h 29' 28"
8	Carlos Salgueiro (POR)	LA Alumínios / LA Sport	+ 1h 31' 52"
9	José Sousa (POR)	Kelly / Simoldes / UDO	+ 1h 39' 38"
10	Bernardo Saavedra (POR)	Feirense	+ 1h 44' 56"

=== Portuguese rider classification ===
Final Portuguese rider classification (1–10)
Rank	Rider	Team	Time
1	Amaro Antunes (POR)	W52 / FC Porto	29h 28' 57"
2	Frederico Figueiredo (POR)	Atum General / Tavira / Maria Nova Hotel	+ 52"
3	Joni Brandão (POR)	Efapel	+ 1' 23"
4	João Benta (POR)	Rádio Popular–Boavista	+ 1' 50"
5	António Carvalho (POR)	Efapel	+ 1' 52"
6	João Rodrigues (POR)	W52 / FC Porto	+ 2' 00"
7	Luís Fernandes (POR)	Rádio Popular–Boavista	+ 4' 13"
8	Daniel Freitas (POR)	Miranda–Mortágua	+ 6' 43"
9	Ricardo Vilela (POR)	Burgos BH	+ 7' 19"
10	Henrique Casimiro (POR)	Kelly / Simoldes / UDO	+ 8' 18"

=== Teams classification ===
Final teams classification (1–10)
Rank	Team	Time
1	W52 / FC Porto	88h 28' 57"
2	Rádio Popular–Boavista	+ 9' 54"
3	Efapel	+ 11' 47"
4	Nippo–Delko–One Provence	+ 15' 15"
5	Atum General / Tavira / Maria Nova Hotel	+ 20' 44"
6	Kelly / Simoldes / UDO	+ 35' 45"
7	Miranda–Mortágua	+ 46' 39"
8	Arkéa–Samsic	+ 1h 11' 50"
9	Burgos BH	+ 1h 17' 58"
10	Rally Cycling	+ 1h 23' 26"
