= 2019 Volta a Portugal =

Race details
- Dates: July 31 – August 11, 2019
- Stages: 11
- Distance: 1,531.1 km (951.4 mi)

Results
Jersey awarded to the overall winner	Winner	João Rodrigues (POR)	(W52 / FC Porto)
	Second	Joni Brandão (POR)	(Efapel)
	Third	Gustavo César (ESP)	(W52 / FC Porto)
Jersey awarded to the points classification winner	Points	Daniel Mestre (POR)	(W52 / FC Porto)
Jersey awarded to the mountains classification winner	Mountains	Luís Gomes (POR)	(Rádio Popular–Boavista)
Jersey awarded to the young rider classification winner	Young rider	Emanuel Duarte (POR)	(LA Alumínios / LA Sport)
	Combination	João Rodrigues (POR)	(W52 / FC Porto)
	Team	W52 / FC Porto	

The 2019 Volta a Portugal was the 81st edition of the Volta a Portugal cycle race and was held on 31 July to 12 August 2019. The race started in Viseu and finished in Porto.

== Teams ==
The 18 teams participating in the race are:

UCI Professional Continental teams

- W52 / FC Porto
- Israel Cycling Academy
- Euskadi–Murias
- Caja Rural–Seguros RGA
- Arkéa–Samsic

UCI Continental teams

- Medellín
- Amore & Vita–Prodir
- Sporting / Tavira
- Swiss Racing Academy
- Efapel
- Ludofoods–Louletano
- ProTouch
- Fundación Euskadi
- Rádio Popular–Boavista
- Vito–Feirense–PNB
- UD Oliveirense–InOutBuild
- BAI–Sicasal–Petro de Luanda
- LA Alumínios / LA Sport
- Miranda–Mortágua

== Stages ==
Stage characteristics and winners
Stage	Date	Course	Distance	Type	Winner
P	31 July	Viseu	6 km (3.7 mi)	Individual time trial	Samuel Caldeira (POR)
1	1 August	Miranda do Corvo to Leiria	174.7 km (108.6 mi)	Medium mountain stage	Davide Appollonio (ITA)
2	2 August	Marinha Grande to Loures (Santo António dos Cavaleiros)	198.5 km (123.3 mi)	Hilly stage	Mikel Aristi (ESP)
3	3 August	Santarém to Castelo Branco	194.1 km (120.6 mi)	Hilly stage	Daniel Mestre (POR)
4	4 August	Pampilhosa da Serra to Covilhã (Torre)	145 km (90.1 mi)	Mountain stage	João Rodrigues (POR)
5	5 August	Oliveira do Hospital to Guarda	158 km (98.2 mi)	Medium mountain stage	Marco Tizza (ITA)
	6 August	Municipality of Guarda		Rest day	
6	7 August	Torre de Moncorvo to Bragança	189.2 km (117.6 mi)	Medium mountain stage	Héctor Sáez (ESP)
7	8 August	Bragança to Montalegre (Serra do Larouco)	156.2 km (97.1 mi)	Mountain stage	Luís Gomes (POR)
8	9 August	Viana do Castelo to Felgueiras	156.6 km (97.3 mi)	Medium mountain stage	João Benta (POR)
9	10 August	Fafe to Alto da Senhora da Graça	133.5 km (83.0 mi)	Mountain stage	Antonio Carvalho (POR)
10	11 August	Vila Nova de Gaia to Porto	19.5 km (12.1 mi)	Individual time trial	João Rodrigues (POR)
	Total		1,531.1 km (951.4 mi)		

== Classification leadership ==
There arefour main individual classifications being contested in the 2019 Volta a Portugal, as well a team, combination and national rider competition. The most important is the general classification, which is calculated by adding each rider's finishing times on each stage. The rider with the lowest cumulative time is the winner of the general classification and was considered to be the overall winner of the Tour. The rider leading the classification wore a yellow jersey sponsored by Santander.

Second, there is a points classification, which awards a green jersey sponsored by Rubis Gás. In the points classification, cyclists receive points for finishing inside the top 10 in a stage apart from the prologue. Depending on the type of finish, different points are distributed among the top 10. In addition, riders receive points for finishing in the top three at intermediate sprints during each stage – awarded on a 5–3–1 scale.

Points for the mountains classification
Position	1	2	3	4	5	6	7	8	9	10	11	12	13
Points for Category S	25	20	17	15	13	11	9	7	5	4	3	2	1
Points for 1st category	15	13	11	9	7	5	4	3	2	1	0		
Points for 2nd category	10	8	6	4	2	1	0						
Points for 3rd category	5	3	2	1	0								
Points for 4th category	3	2	1	0									

There is also a mountains classification, the leadership of which is marked by a blue jersey sponsored by Liberty Seguros. In the mountains classification, points towards the classification are won by reaching the top of a climb before other cyclists. Each climb is categorised as either category S, 1st, 2nd, 3rd or 4th, with more points available for the higher-categorised climbs.

The fourth jersey represents the young rider classification, marked by a white jersey sponsored by Jogos Santa Casa. This is decided the same way as the general classification, but only riders born on or after 1 January 1996 are eligible to be ranked in the classification.

There were also awards for the team classification, in which the times of the best three cyclists per team on each stage are added together; the leading team at the end of the race is the team with the lowest total time. The number of stage victories and placings per team determined the outcome of a tie. The riders in the team that led this classification were identified with yellow number bibs on the back of their jerseys.

The next individual award was the combination (Kombinado) classification. A rider's ranking in the combination classification was determined by tallying up his positions in the general, points and mountains classifications. If no rider was classified in all three classifications, riders classified in two would have been considered, and if that was tied the general classification will decide the winner. This classification was sponsored by Kia.

The seven and final award represents the classification for Portuguese riders and was sponsored by Jogos Santa Casa. This is decided the same way as the general classification, but only riders born in Portugal are eligible to be ranked in the classification. Like the combination award this is only presented on the podium and is not worn in race.

A total of €128,790 was awarded in cash prizes in the race. The overall winner of the general classification received €16,045, with the second and third placed riders getting €8,115 and €3,985 respectively. All finishers in the top 20 were awarded with money. The final winners of the points, mountains, young rider, combination and best Portuguese rider classifications were given €1,500. The team classification winners were awarded a trophy. €3,060 was given to the winners of each stage of the race, apart from the prologue where the winner was given €1,490, with smaller amounts given to places 2–20.

Classification leadership by stage
Stage	Winner	General classification	Points classification	Mountains classification	Young rider classification	Team classification	Combination classification	Portuguese rider classification
P	Samuel Caldeira	Samuel Caldeira	no award	no award	Thibault Guernalec	W52 / FC Porto	no award	Samuel Caldeira
1	Davide Appollonio	Samuel Caldeira	Davide Appollonio	Peio Goikoetxea	Thibault Guernalec	W52 / FC Porto	Daniel Mestre	Samuel Caldeira
2	Mikel Aristi	Gustavo César	Davide Appollonio	Peio Goikoetxea	Urko Berrade	W52 / FC Porto	Daniel Mestre	Joni Brandão
3	Daniel Mestre	Gustavo César	Daniel Mestre	Peio Goikoetxea	Urko Berrade	W52 / FC Porto	Daniel Mestre	Daniel Mestre
4	João Rodrigues	Gustavo César	Daniel Mestre	Peio Goikoetxea	Emanuel Duarte	W52 / FC Porto	Gustavo César	João Rodrigues
5	Marco Tizza	Gustavo César	Daniel Mestre	David Ribeiro	Emanuel Duarte	W52 / FC Porto	Gustavo César	João Rodrigues
6	Héctor Sáez	Gustavo César	Daniel Mestre	Luís Gomes	Emanuel Duarte	W52 / FC Porto	Gustavo César	João Rodrigues
7	Luís Gomes	Joni Brandão	Daniel Mestre	Luís Gomes	Unai Cuadrado	Rádio Popular–Boavista	Gustavo César	Joni Brandão
8	João Benta	Joni Brandão	Daniel Mestre	Luís Gomes	Unai Cuadrado	Rádio Popular–Boavista	Gustavo César	Joni Brandão
9	Antonio Carvalho	Joni Brandão	Daniel Mestre	Luís Gomes	Emanuel Duarte	Rádio Popular–Boavista	João Rodrigues	Joni Brandão
10	João Rodrigues	João Rodrigues	Daniel Mestre	Luís Gomes	Emanuel Duarte	W52 / FC Porto	João Rodrigues	João Rodrigues
Final		João Rodrigues	Daniel Mestre	Luís Gomes	Emanuel Duarte	W52 / FC Porto	João Rodrigues	João Rodrigues
