= 2022 Quick-Step Alpha Vinyl Team season =

Quick-Step Alpha Vinyl Team
- 2022 season
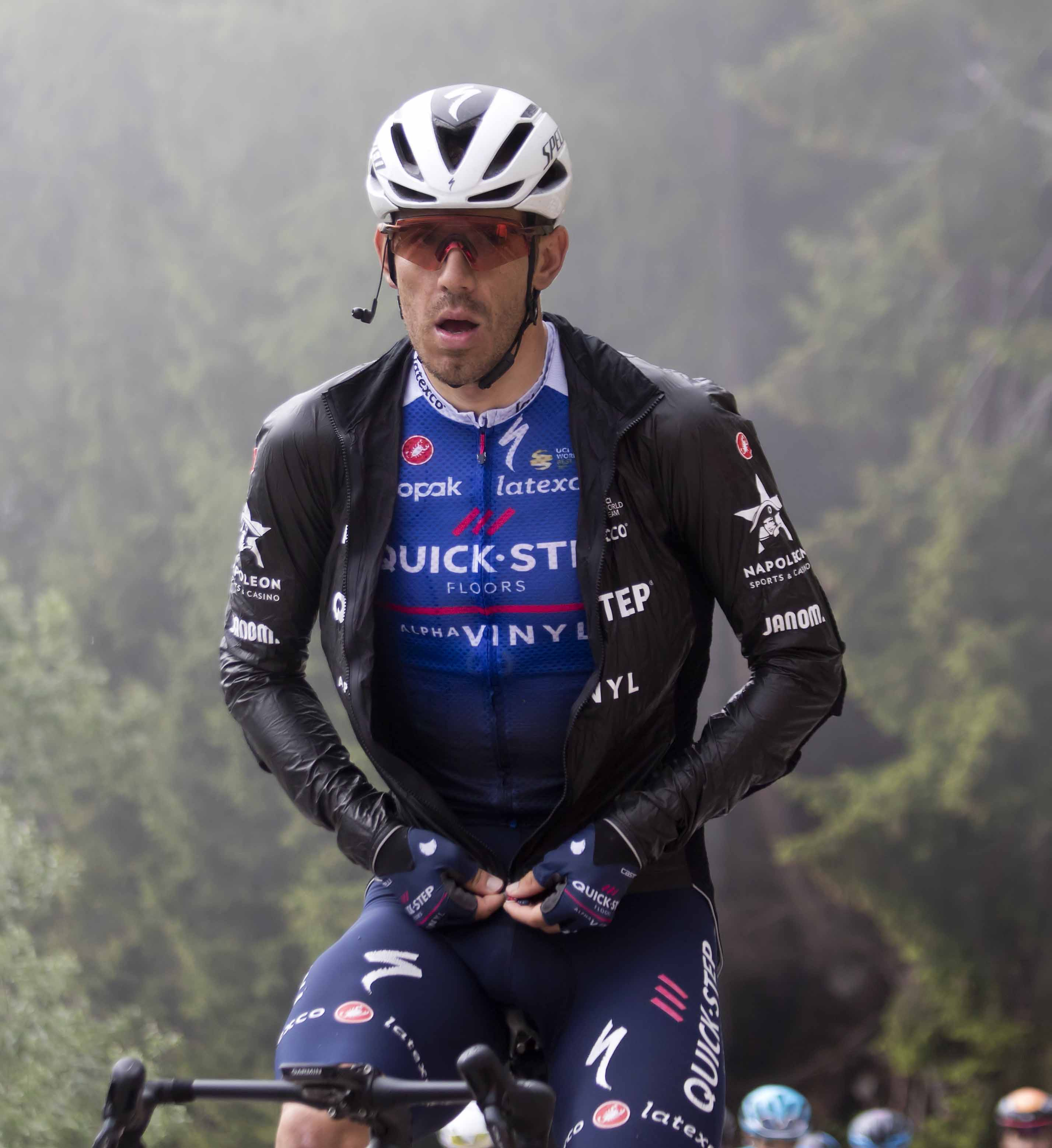
- Davide Ballerini on Stage 17 Giro d'Italia
- UCI code: QST
- Status: UCI WorldTeam
- Manager: Patrick Lefevere (BEL)
- Main sponsor(s): Quick-Step Flooring
- Based: Belgium
- Bicycles: Specialized
- Groupset: Shimano

Season victories
- One-day races: 7
- Stage race overall: 4
- Stage race stages: 32
- Grand Tours: 1
- World Championships: 1
- National Championships: 3
- Jersey

The 2022 season for Quick-Step Alpha Vinyl Team is the 20th season in the team's existence. The team has been a UCI WorldTeam since 2005, when the tier was first established. Long-time sponsor Quick-Step Flooring, which has been a title sponsor since the team's formation in 2003, continues its sponsorship, while Deceuninck ends its sponsorship after three years. In its place, the team will take on the name of one of Quick-Step's sub-brands, Alpha Vinyl. They use Specialized bicycles, Shimano drivetrain, Roval wheels and Vermarc clothing.

The team are the UCI World Team Ranking champions, having won it for the third time in the past four seasons.

== Team roster ==
As of 7 January 2022.

Rider	Date of birth
Julian Alaphilippe (FRA)	11 June 1992 (aged 28)
Kasper Asgreen (DEN)	8 February 1995 (aged 25)
Andrea Bagioli (ITA)	23 March 1999 (aged 21)
Davide Ballerini (ITA)	21 September 1994 (aged 26)
Mattia Cattaneo (ITA)	25 October 1990 (aged 30)
Rémi Cavagna (FRA)	10 August 1995 (aged 25)
Mark Cavendish (GBR)	21 May 1985 (aged 35)
Josef Černý (CZE)	11 May 1993 (aged 27)
Tim Declercq (BEL)	21 March 1989 (aged 31)
Dries Devenyns (BEL)	22 July 1983 (aged 37)
Remco Evenepoel (BEL)	25 January 2000 (aged 20)
Mikkel Frølich Honoré (DEN)	21 January 1997 (aged 23)
Fabio Jakobsen (NED)	31 August 1996 (aged 24)
Iljo Keisse (BEL)	21 December 1982 (aged 38)
James Knox (GBR)	4 November 1995 (aged 25)

Rider	Date of birth
Yves Lampaert (BEL)	10 April 1991 (aged 29)
Fausto Masnada (ITA)	6 November 1993 (aged 27)
Michael Mørkøv (DEN)	30 April 1985 (aged 35)
Mauro Schmid (SUI)	4 December 1999 (aged 21)
Florian Sénéchal (FRA)	10 July 1993 (aged 27)
Pieter Serry (BEL)	21 November 1988 (aged 32)
Stijn Steels (BEL)	21 August 1989 (aged 31)
Jannik Steimle (GER)	4 April 1996 (aged 24)
Zdeněk Štybar (CZE)	11 December 1985 (aged 35)
Bert Van Lerberghe (BEL)	29 September 1992 (aged 28)
Stan Van Tricht (BEL)	20 September 1999 (aged 21)
Ilan Van Wilder (Note: After a contractual dispute between Van Wilder and Team DSM, his contracted was terminated and he joined Deceuninck–Quick-Step with immediate effect on 18 November 2021.) (BEL)	14 May 2000 (aged 20)
Mauri Vansevenant (BEL)	1 June 1999 (aged 21)
Ethan Vernon (GBR)	26 August 2000 (aged 20)
Louis Vervaeke (BEL)	6 October 1993 (aged 27)

Riders who joined the team for the 2022 season

Rider	2021 team
Mauro Schmid	Team Qhubeka NextHash
Martin Svrček (Note: Svrček will join the team on 1 July after spending the first half of the year with Biesse–Carrera.)	neo-pro (Biesse–Carrera)
Stan Van Tricht	neo-pro (SEG Racing Academy)
Ilan Van Wilder	Team DSM
Ethan Vernon	neo-pro (Team Inspired)
Louis Vervaeke	Alpecin–Fenix

Riders who left the team during or after the 2021 season

Rider	2022 team
João Almeida	UAE Team Emirates
Shane Archbold	Bora–Hansgrohe
Sam Bennett	Bora–Hansgrohe
Ian Garrison	L39ION of Los Angeles
Álvaro Hodeg	UAE Team Emirates

== Season victories ==
Date	Race	Competition	Rider	Country	Location	Ref.
2 February	Volta a la Comunitat Valenciana, Stage 1	UCI ProSeries	Remco Evenepoel (BEL)	Spain	Torralba del Pinar	
3 February	Volta a la Comunitat Valenciana, Stage 2	UCI ProSeries	Fabio Jakobsen (NED)	Spain	Torrent	
5 February	Saudi Tour, Team classification	UCI Asia Tour	(Note: The riders in the squad were Andrea Bagioli, Davide Ballerini, Tim Declercq, Iljo Keisse, Florian Sénéchal, Jannik Steimle, and Bert Van Lerberghe.)	Saudi Arabia		
6 February	Volta a la Comunitat Valenciana, Stage 5	UCI ProSeries	Fabio Jakobsen (NED)	Spain	Valencia	
6 February	Volta a la Comunitat Valenciana, Points classification	UCI ProSeries	Fabio Jakobsen (NED)	Spain		
6 February	Volta a la Comunitat Valenciana, Young rider classification	UCI ProSeries	Remco Evenepoel (BEL)	Spain		
11 February	Tour of Oman, Stage 2	UCI ProSeries	Mark Cavendish (GBR)	Oman	Suhar Corniche	
13 February	Tour of Oman, Stage 4	UCI ProSeries	Fausto Masnada (ITA)	Oman	Muscat Royal Opera	
13 February	Tour de la Provence, Points classification	UCI ProSeries	Julian Alaphilippe (FRA)	France		
13 February	Tour de la Provence, Team classification	UCI ProSeries	(Note: The riders in the squad were Julian Alaphilippe, Dries Devenyns, Pieter Serry, Ilan Van Wilder, and Louis Vervaeke.)	France		
16 February	Volta ao Algarve, Stage 1	UCI ProSeries	Fabio Jakobsen (NED)	Portugal	Lagos	
18 February	Volta ao Algarve, Stage 3	UCI ProSeries	Fabio Jakobsen (NED)	Portugal	Faro	
19 February	Volta ao Algarve, Stage 4 (ITT)	UCI ProSeries	Remco Evenepoel (BEL)	Portugal	Tavira	
20 February	Volta ao Algarve, Overall	UCI ProSeries	Remco Evenepoel (BEL)	Portugal		
20 February	Volta ao Algarve, Points classification	UCI ProSeries	Fabio Jakobsen (NED)	Portugal		
20 February	Volta ao Algarve, Young rider classification	UCI ProSeries	Remco Evenepoel (BEL)	Portugal		
21 February	UAE Tour, Stage 2	UCI World Tour	Mark Cavendish (GBR)	United Arab Emirates	Abu Dhabi Breakwater	
27 February	Kuurne–Brussels–Kuurne	UCI ProSeries	Fabio Jakobsen (NED)	Belgium	Kuurne	
7 March	Paris–Nice, Stage 2	UCI World Tour	Fabio Jakobsen (NED)	France	Orléans	
16 March	Milano–Torino	UCI ProSeries	Mark Cavendish (GBR)	Italy	Rivoli	
22 March	Settimana Internazionale di Coppi e Bartali, Stage 1	UCI Europe Tour	Mauro Schmid (SUI)	Italy	Riccione	
25 March	Volta a Catalunya, Stage 5	UCI World Tour	Ethan Vernon (GBR)	Spain	Vilanova i la Geltrú	
26 March	Settimana Internazionale di Coppi e Bartali, Stage 5	UCI Europe Tour	Josef Černý (CZE)	Italy	Cantagrillo	
27 March	Volta a Catalunya, Stage 7	UCI World Tour	Andrea Bagioli (ITA)	Spain	Barcelona	
5 April	Tour of the Basque Country, Stage 2	UCI World Tour	Julian Alaphilippe (FRA)	Spain	Viana	
9 April	Tour of the Basque Country, Young rider classification	UCI World Tour	Remco Evenepoel (BEL)	Spain		
24 April	Liège–Bastogne–Liège	UCI World Tour	Remco Evenepoel (BEL)	Belgium	Liège	
8 May	Giro d'Italia, Stage 3	UCI World Tour	Mark Cavendish (GBR)	Hungary	Budapest	
12 May	Tour de Hongrie, Stage 2	UCI Europe Tour	Fabio Jakobsen (NED)	Hungary	Hajdúszoboszló	
13 May	Tour de Hongrie, Stage 3	UCI Europe Tour	Fabio Jakobsen (NED)	Hungary	Nyíregyháza	
15 May	Tour de Hongrie, Points classification	UCI Europe Tour	Fabio Jakobsen (NED)	Hungary		
24 May	Tour of Norway, Stage 1	UCI ProSeries	Remco Evenepoel (BEL)	Norway	Voss	
26 May	Tour of Norway, Stage 3	UCI ProSeries	Remco Evenepoel (BEL)	Norway	Gaustatoppen	
28 May	Tour of Norway, Stage 5	UCI ProSeries	Remco Evenepoel (BEL)	Norway	Sandnes	
29 May	Tour of Norway, Overall	UCI ProSeries	Remco Evenepoel (BEL)	Norway		
29 May	Tour of Norway, Young rider classification	UCI ProSeries	Remco Evenepoel (BEL)	Norway		
12 June	Elfstedenronde	UCI Europe Tour	Fabio Jakobsen (NED)	Belgium	Bruges	
17 June	Tour of Belgium, Stage 3 (ITT)	UCI ProSeries	Yves Lampaert (BEL)	Belgium	Scherpenheuvel-Zichem	
19 June	Tour of Belgium, Stage 5	UCI ProSeries	Fabio Jakobsen (NED)	Belgium	Beringen	
19 June	Tour of Belgium, Overall	UCI ProSeries	Mauro Schmid (SUI)	Belgium		
19 June	Tour de Suisse, Stage 8 (ITT)	UCI World Tour	Remco Evenepoel (BEL)	Liechtenstein	Vaduz	
11 July	Tour de France, Stage 1 (ITT)	UCI World Tour	Yves Lampaert (BEL)	Denmark	Copenhagen	
12 July	Tour de France, Stage 2	UCI World Tour	Fabio Jakobsen (NED)	Denmark	Nyborg	
23 July	Tour de Wallonie, Stage 1	UCI ProSeries	Julian Alaphilippe (FRA)	Belgium	Huy	
26 July	Tour de Wallonie, Stage 4	UCI ProSeries	Davide Ballerini (ITA)	Belgium	Couvin	
30 July	Clásica de San Sebastián	UCI World Tour	Remco Evenepoel (BEL)	Spain	San Sebastián	
30 August	Vuelta a España, Stage 10 (ITT)	UCI World Tour	Remco Evenepoel (BEL)	Spain	Alicante	
8 September	Vuelta a España, Stage 18	UCI World Tour	Remco Evenepoel (BEL)	Spain	Piornal	
11 September	2022 Vuelta a España, Overall	UCI World Tour	Remco Evenepoel (BEL)	Spain		
11 September	2022 Vuelta a España, Young rider classification	UCI World Tour	Remco Evenepoel (BEL)	Spain		
13 September	Okolo Slovenska, Prologue (ITT)	UCI Europe Tour	Ethan Vernon (GBR)	Slovenia	Bratislava	
14 September	Okolo Slovenska, Stage 1	UCI Europe Tour	Ethan Vernon (GBR)	Slovenia	Trnava	
16 September	Kampioenschap van Vlaanderen	UCI Europe Tour	Fabio Jakobsen (NED)	Belgium	Ardooie	
17 September	Okolo Slovenska, Overall	UCI Europe Tour	Josef Černý (CZE)	Slovenia		
3 October	Coppa Bernocchi	UCI Europe Tour	Davide Ballerini (ITA)	Italy	Legnano	

== National, Continental, and World Champions ==
Date	Discipline	Jersey	Rider	Country	Location	Ref.
