= 2022 Volta ao Algarve =

Portuguese cycling race

2022 UCI ProSeries

Race details
- Dates: 16–20 February 2022
- Stages: 5
- Distance: 798.1 km (495.9 mi)
- Winning time: 19h 35' 03"

Results
Jersey awarded to the overall winner	Winner	Remco Evenepoel (BEL)	(Quick-Step Alpha Vinyl Team)
	Second	Brandon McNulty (USA)	(UAE Team Emirates)
	Third	Daniel Martínez (COL)	(Ineos Grenadiers)
Jersey awarded to the points classification winner	Points	Fabio Jakobsen (NED)	(Quick-Step Alpha Vinyl Team)
Jersey awarded to the mountains classification winner	Mountains	João Matias (POR)	(Tavfer–Mortágua–Ovos Matinados)
Jersey awarded to the youth classification winner	Youth	Remco Evenepoel (BEL)	(Quick-Step Alpha Vinyl Team)
	Team	Ineos Grenadiers	

The 2022 Volta ao Algarve (English: Tour of the Algarve) was a road cycling stage race that took place between 16 and 20 February 2022 in the Algarve region of southern Portugal. The race was rated as a category 2.Pro event on the 2022 UCI ProSeries calendar, and was the 48th edition of the Volta ao Algarve.

After the 2021 edition was postponed to May due to a rising number of COVID-19 cases in Portugal, the race returned to its traditional mid-February timeslot.

== Teams ==
10 of the 18 UCI WorldTeams, five UCI ProTeams, and ten UCI Continental teams made up the 25 teams that participated in the race. Only five teams did not enter a full squad of seven riders; Groupama–FDJ and Trek–Segafredo each entered six riders, while Human Powered Health, Team Jumbo–Visma, and UAE Team Emirates each entered five riders. There were two non-starters, one from Cofidis and Human Powered Health each, which reduced those teams to six and four riders, respectively. In total, 165 riders started the race, of which 133 finished.

UCI WorldTeams

- Astana Qazaqstan Team
- Bora–Hansgrohe
- Cofidis
- Groupama–FDJ
- Ineos Grenadiers
- Intermarché–Wanty–Gobert Matériaux
- Quick-Step Alpha Vinyl Team
- Team Jumbo–Visma
- Trek–Segafredo
- UAE Team Emirates

UCI ProTeams

- Alpecin–Fenix
- Arkéa–Samsic
- Caja Rural–Seguros RGA
- Euskaltel–Euskadi
- Human Powered Health

UCI Continental Teams

- ABTF–Feirense
- Atum General / Tavira / AP Maria Nova Hotel
- Aviludo–Louletano–Loulé Concelho
- Efapel Cycling
- Glassdrive–Q8–Anicolor
- Kelly / Simoldes / UDO
- LA Alumínios / Credibom / Marcos Car
- Rádio Popular–Paredes–Boavista
- Tavfer–Mortágua–Ovos Matinados
- W52 / FC Porto

== Route ==
Stage characteristics and winners
Stage	Date	Course	Distance	Type	Stage winner
1	16 February	Portimão to Lagos	199.1 km (123.7 mi)	Flat stage	Fabio Jakobsen (NED)
2	17 February	Albufeira to Alto da Fóia (Monchique)	182.4 km (113.3 mi)	Mountain stage	David Gaudu (FRA)
3	18 February	Almodôvar to Faro	211.4 km (131.4 mi)	Flat stage	Fabio Jakobsen (NED)
4	19 February	Vila Real de Santo António to Tavira	32.2 km (20.0 mi)	Individual time trial	Remco Evenepoel (BEL)
5	20 February	Lagoa to Alto do Malhão (Loulé)	173 km (107 mi)	Mountain stage	Sergio Higuita (COL)
Total			798.1 km (495.9 mi)		

== Stages ==
=== Stage 1 ===
16 February 2022 – Portimão to Lagos, 199.1 km (123.7 mi)

Stage 1 Result (1–10)
Rank	Rider	Team	Time
1	Fabio Jakobsen (NED)	Quick-Step Alpha Vinyl Team	4h 56' 29"
2	Bryan Coquard (FRA)	Cofidis	+ 0"
3	Alexander Kristoff (NOR)	Intermarché–Wanty–Gobert Matériaux	+ 0"
4	Michele Gazzoli (ITA)	Astana Qazaqstan Team	+ 0"
5	Rui Oliveira (POR)	UAE Team Emirates	+ 0"
6	Bert Van Lerberghe (BEL)	Quick-Step Alpha Vinyl Team	+ 0"
7	Remco Evenepoel (BEL)	Quick-Step Alpha Vinyl Team	+ 0"
8	Nils Politt (GER)	Bora–Hansgrohe	+ 0"
9	Brandon McNulty (USA)	UAE Team Emirates	+ 0"
10	Tobias Foss (NOR)	Team Jumbo–Visma	+ 0"

General classification after Stage 1 (1–10)
Rank	Rider	Team	Time
1	Fabio Jakobsen (NED)	Quick-Step Alpha Vinyl Team	4h 56' 29"
2	Bryan Coquard (FRA)	Cofidis	+ 0"
3	Alexander Kristoff (NOR)	Intermarché–Wanty–Gobert Matériaux	+ 0"
4	Michele Gazzoli (ITA)	Astana Qazaqstan Team	+ 0"
5	Rui Oliveira (POR)	UAE Team Emirates	+ 0"
6	Bert Van Lerberghe (BEL)	Quick-Step Alpha Vinyl Team	+ 0"
7	Remco Evenepoel (BEL)	Quick-Step Alpha Vinyl Team	+ 0"
8	Nils Politt (GER)	Bora–Hansgrohe	+ 0"
9	Brandon McNulty (USA)	UAE Team Emirates	+ 0"
10	Tobias Foss (NOR)	Team Jumbo–Visma	+ 0"

=== Stage 2 ===
17 February 2022 – Albufeira to Alto da Fóia (Monchique), 182.4 km (113.3 mi)

Stage 2 Result (1–10)
Rank	Rider	Team	Time
1	David Gaudu (FRA)	Groupama–FDJ	4h 50' 51"
2	Samuele Battistella (ITA)	Astana Qazaqstan Team	+ 1"
3	Ethan Hayter (GBR)	Ineos Grenadiers	+ 1"
4	Brandon McNulty (USA)	UAE Team Emirates	+ 1"
5	Daniel Martínez (COL)	Ineos Grenadiers	+ 1"
6	Remco Evenepoel (BEL)	Quick-Step Alpha Vinyl Team	+ 1"
7	Julien Bernard (FRA)	Trek–Segafredo	+ 1"
8	Georg Zimmermann (GER)	Intermarché–Wanty–Gobert Matériaux	+ 1"
9	Tony Gallopin (FRA)	Trek–Segafredo	+ 1"
10	Sven Erik Bystrøm (NOR)	Intermarché–Wanty–Gobert Matériaux	+ 1"

General classification after Stage 2 (1–10)
Rank	Rider	Team	Time
1	David Gaudu (FRA)	Groupama–FDJ	9h 47' 20"
2	Brandon McNulty (USA)	UAE Team Emirates	+ 1"
3	Remco Evenepoel (BEL)	Quick-Step Alpha Vinyl Team	+ 1"
4	Ethan Hayter (GBR)	Ineos Grenadiers	+ 1"
5	Daniel Martínez (COL)	Ineos Grenadiers	+ 1"
6	Julien Bernard (FRA)	Trek–Segafredo	+ 1"
7	Sven Erik Bystrøm (NOR)	Intermarché–Wanty–Gobert Matériaux	+ 1"
8	Tony Gallopin (FRA)	Trek–Segafredo	+ 8"
9	Tom Pidcock (GBR)	Ineos Grenadiers	+ 17"
10	Dylan van Baarle (NED)	Ineos Grenadiers	+ 18"

=== Stage 3 ===
18 February 2022 – Almodôvar to Faro, 211.4 km (131.4 mi)

Stage 3 Result (1–10)
Rank	Rider	Team	Time
1	Fabio Jakobsen (NED)	Quick-Step Alpha Vinyl Team	4h 54' 51"
2	Tim Merlier (BEL)	Alpecin–Fenix	+ 0"
3	Bryan Coquard (FRA)	Cofidis	+ 0"
4	Alexander Kristoff (NOR)	Intermarché–Wanty–Gobert Matériaux	+ 0"
5	Hugo Hofstetter (FRA)	Arkéa–Samsic	+ 0"
6	Clément Russo (FRA)	Arkéa–Samsic	+ 0"
7	Jordi Meeus (BEL)	Bora–Hansgrohe	+ 0"
8	Michele Gazzoli (ITA)	Astana Qazaqstan Team	+ 0"
9	Colin Joyce (USA)	Human Powered Health	+ 0"
10	Leangel Linarez (VEN)	Tavfer–Mortágua–Ovos Matinados	+ 0"

General classification after Stage 3 (1–10)
Rank	Rider	Team	Time
1	David Gaudu (FRA)	Groupama–FDJ	14h 42' 11"
2	Brandon McNulty (USA)	UAE Team Emirates	+ 1"
3	Ethan Hayter (GBR)	Ineos Grenadiers	+ 1"
4	Remco Evenepoel (BEL)	Quick-Step Alpha Vinyl Team	+ 1"
5	Sven Erik Bystrøm (NOR)	Intermarché–Wanty–Gobert Matériaux	+ 1"
6	Julien Bernard (FRA)	Trek–Segafredo	+ 1"
7	Daniel Martínez (COL)	Ineos Grenadiers	+ 1"
8	Tony Gallopin (FRA)	Trek–Segafredo	+ 8"
9	Tom Pidcock (GBR)	Ineos Grenadiers	+ 17"
10	Dylan van Baarle (NED)	Ineos Grenadiers	+ 18"

=== Stage 4 ===
19 February 2022 – Vila Real de Santo António to Tavira, 32.2 km (20.0 mi) (ITT)

Stage 4 Result (1–10)
Rank	Rider	Team	Time
1	Remco Evenepoel (BEL)	Quick-Step Alpha Vinyl Team	37' 49"
2	Stefan Küng (SUI)	Groupama–FDJ	+ 58"
3	Ethan Hayter (GBR)	Ineos Grenadiers	+ 1' 06"
4	Tobias Foss (NOR)	Team Jumbo–Visma	+ 1' 11"
5	Brandon McNulty (USA)	UAE Team Emirates	+ 1' 25"
6	Thibault Guernalec (FRA)	Arkéa–Samsic	+ 1' 27"
7	Daniel Martínez (COL)	Ineos Grenadiers	+ 1' 30"
8	Daan Hoole (NED)	Trek–Segafredo	+ 1' 38"
9	David Gaudu (FRA)	Groupama–FDJ	+ 2' 09"
10	Connor Swift (GBR)	Arkéa–Samsic	+ 2' 12"

General classification after Stage 4 (1–10)
Rank	Rider	Team	Time
1	Remco Evenepoel (BEL)	Quick-Step Alpha Vinyl Team	15h 20' 01"
2	Ethan Hayter (GBR)	Ineos Grenadiers	+ 1' 06"
3	Brandon McNulty (USA)	UAE Team Emirates	+ 1' 25"
4	Daniel Martínez (COL)	Ineos Grenadiers	+ 1' 30"
5	Stefan Küng (SUI)	Groupama–FDJ	+ 1' 43"
6	Tobias Foss (NOR)	Team Jumbo–Visma	+ 1' 51"
7	David Gaudu (FRA)	Groupama–FDJ	+ 2' 08"
8	Thibault Guernalec (FRA)	Arkéa–Samsic	+ 2' 08"
9	Dylan van Baarle (NED)	Ineos Grenadiers	+ 2' 37"
10	Sven Erik Bystrøm (NOR)	Intermarché–Wanty–Gobert Matériaux	+ 2' 40"

=== Stage 5 ===
20 February 2022 – Lagoa to Alto do Malhão (Loulé), 173 km (107 mi)

Stage 5 Result (1–10)
Rank	Rider	Team	Time
1	Sergio Higuita (COL)	Bora–Hansgrohe	4h 14' 53"
2	Daniel Martínez (COL)	Ineos Grenadiers	+ 0"
3	Brandon McNulty (USA)	UAE Team Emirates	+ 1"
4	David Gaudu (FRA)	Groupama–FDJ	+ 1"
5	Remco Evenepoel (BEL)	Quick-Step Alpha Vinyl Team	+ 9"
6	Tobias Foss (NOR)	Team Jumbo–Visma	+ 22"
7	Jay Vine (AUS)	Alpecin–Fenix	+ 22"
8	Frederico Figueiredo (POR)	Glassdrive–Q8–Anicolor	+ 40"
9	Sven Erik Bystrøm (NOR)	Intermarché–Wanty–Gobert Matériaux	+ 42"
10	Ethan Hayter (GBR)	Ineos Grenadiers	+ 42"

General classification after Stage 5 (1–10)
Rank	Rider	Team	Time
1	Remco Evenepoel (BEL)	Quick-Step Alpha Vinyl Team	19h 35' 03"
2	Brandon McNulty (USA)	UAE Team Emirates	+ 1' 17"
3	Daniel Martínez (COL)	Ineos Grenadiers	+ 1' 21"
4	Ethan Hayter (GBR)	Ineos Grenadiers	+ 1' 39"
5	David Gaudu (FRA)	Groupama–FDJ	+ 2' 00"
6	Tobias Foss (NOR)	Team Jumbo–Visma	+ 2' 04"
7	Stefan Küng (SUI)	Groupama–FDJ	+ 2' 16"
8	Thibault Guernalec (FRA)	Arkéa–Samsic	+ 2' 41"
9	Sven Erik Bystrøm (NOR)	Intermarché–Wanty–Gobert Matériaux	+ 3' 13"
10	Dylan van Baarle (NED)	Ineos Grenadiers	+ 3' 38"

== Classification leadership table ==
Classification leadership by stage
Stage	Winner	General classification	Points classification	Mountains classification	Young rider classification	Team classification
1	Fabio Jakobsen	Fabio Jakobsen	Fabio Jakobsen	João Matias	Remco Evenepoel	Quick-Step Alpha Vinyl Team
2	David Gaudu	David Gaudu	Fabio Jakobsen	David Gaudu	Remco Evenepoel	Ineos Grenadiers
3	Fabio Jakobsen	David Gaudu	Fabio Jakobsen	João Matias	Remco Evenepoel	Ineos Grenadiers
4	Remco Evenepoel	Remco Evenepoel	Fabio Jakobsen	João Matias	Remco Evenepoel	Ineos Grenadiers
5	Sergio Higuita	Remco Evenepoel	Fabio Jakobsen	João Matias	Remco Evenepoel	Ineos Grenadiers
Final		Remco Evenepoel	Fabio Jakobsen	João Matias	Remco Evenepoel	Ineos Grenadiers

- On stage 2, Bryan Coquard, who was second in the points classification, wore the green jersey, because first-placed Fabio Jakobsen wore the yellow jersey as the leader of the general classification.
- On stage 3, João Matias, who was second in the mountains classification, wore the blue jersey, because first-placed David Gaudu wore the yellow jersey as the leader of the general classification.
- On stage 5, Johannes Staune-Mittet, who was second in the young rider classification, wore the white jersey, because first-placed Remco Evenepoel wore the yellow jersey as the leader of the general classification.

== Final classification standings ==
Legend
Denotes the winner of the general classification	Denotes the winner of the mountains classification
Denotes the winner of the points classification	Denotes the winner of the young rider classification

=== General classification ===
Final general classification (1–10)
Rank	Rider	Team	Time
1	Remco Evenepoel (BEL)	Quick-Step Alpha Vinyl Team	19h 35' 03"
2	Brandon McNulty (USA)	UAE Team Emirates	+ 1' 17"
3	Daniel Martínez (COL)	Ineos Grenadiers	+ 1' 21"
4	Ethan Hayter (GBR)	Ineos Grenadiers	+ 1' 39"
5	David Gaudu (FRA)	Groupama–FDJ	+ 2' 00"
6	Tobias Foss (NOR)	Team Jumbo–Visma	+ 2' 04"
7	Stefan Küng (SUI)	Groupama–FDJ	+ 2' 16"
8	Thibault Guernalec (FRA)	Arkéa–Samsic	+ 2' 41"
9	Sven Erik Bystrøm (NOR)	Intermarché–Wanty–Gobert Matériaux	+ 3' 13"
10	Dylan van Baarle (NED)	Ineos Grenadiers	+ 3' 38"

=== Points classification ===
Final points classification (1–10)
Rank	Rider	Team	Points
1	Fabio Jakobsen (NED)	Quick-Step Alpha Vinyl Team	51
2	Bryan Coquard (FRA)	Cofidis	36
3	Alexander Kristoff (NOR)	Intermarché–Wanty–Gobert Matériaux	29
4	David Gaudu (FRA)	Groupama–FDJ	23
5	Brandon McNulty (USA)	UAE Team Emirates	20
6	Tim Merlier (BEL)	Alpecin–Fenix	20
7	Daniel Martínez (COL)	Ineos Grenadiers	18
8	Remco Evenepoel (BEL)	Quick-Step Alpha Vinyl Team	17
9	Michele Gazzoli (ITA)	Astana Qazaqstan Team	17
10	Sergio Higuita (COL)	Bora–Hansgrohe	15

=== Mountains classification ===
Final mountains classification (1–10)
Rank	Rider	Team	Points
1	João Matias (POR)	Tavfer–Mortágua–Ovos Matinados	15
2	David Gaudu (FRA)	Groupama–FDJ	12
3	Dries De Bondt (BEL)	Alpecin–Fenix	10
4	Ethan Hayter (GBR)	Ineos Grenadiers	9
5	Brandon McNulty (USA)	UAE Team Emirates	7
6	Jonathan Castroviejo (ESP)	Ineos Grenadiers	7
7	Sergio Higuita (COL)	Bora–Hansgrohe	6
8	Ben Tulett (GBR)	Ineos Grenadiers	6
9	Daniel Martínez (COL)	Ineos Grenadiers	6
10	José Neves (POR)	W52 / FC Porto	4

=== Young rider classification ===
Final young rider classification (1–10)
Rank	Rider	Team	Time
1	Remco Evenepoel (BEL)	Quick-Step Alpha Vinyl Team	19h 35' 03"
2	Johannes Staune-Mittet (NOR)	Team Jumbo–Visma	+ 11' 32"
3	Pedro Pinto (POR)	Tavfer–Mortágua–Ovos Matinados	+ 12' 05"
4	António Ferreira (POR)	Kelly / Simoldes / UDO	+ 26' 10"
5	Afonso Silva (POR)	Kelly / Simoldes / UDO	+ 27' 11"
6	Vinício Rodrigues (POR)	Rádio Popular–Paredes–Boavista	+ 32' 56"
7	Michel Hessmann (GER)	Team Jumbo–Visma	+ 33' 45"
8	Hélder Gonçalves (POR)	Kelly / Simoldes / UDO	+ 34' 00"
9	Rúben Simão (POR)	LA Alumínios / Credibom / Marcos Car	+ 39' 19"
10	Ben Tulett (GBR)	Ineos Grenadiers	+ 39' 51"

=== Team classification ===
Final team classification (1–10)
Rank	Team	Time
1	Ineos Grenadiers	58h 51' 40"
2	Arkéa–Samsic	+ 3' 57"
3	Groupama–FDJ	+ 6' 26"
4	Trek–Segafredo	+ 13' 20"
5	Team Jumbo–Visma	+ 14' 27"
6	Bora–Hansgrohe	+ 18' 32"
7	Intermarché–Wanty–Gobert Matériaux	+ 23' 01"
8	W52 / FC Porto	+ 25' 49"
9	Caja Rural–Seguros RGA	+ 26' 05"
10	Alpecin–Fenix	+ 26' 29"
