= Luís Gomes (cyclist) =

Portuguese cyclist

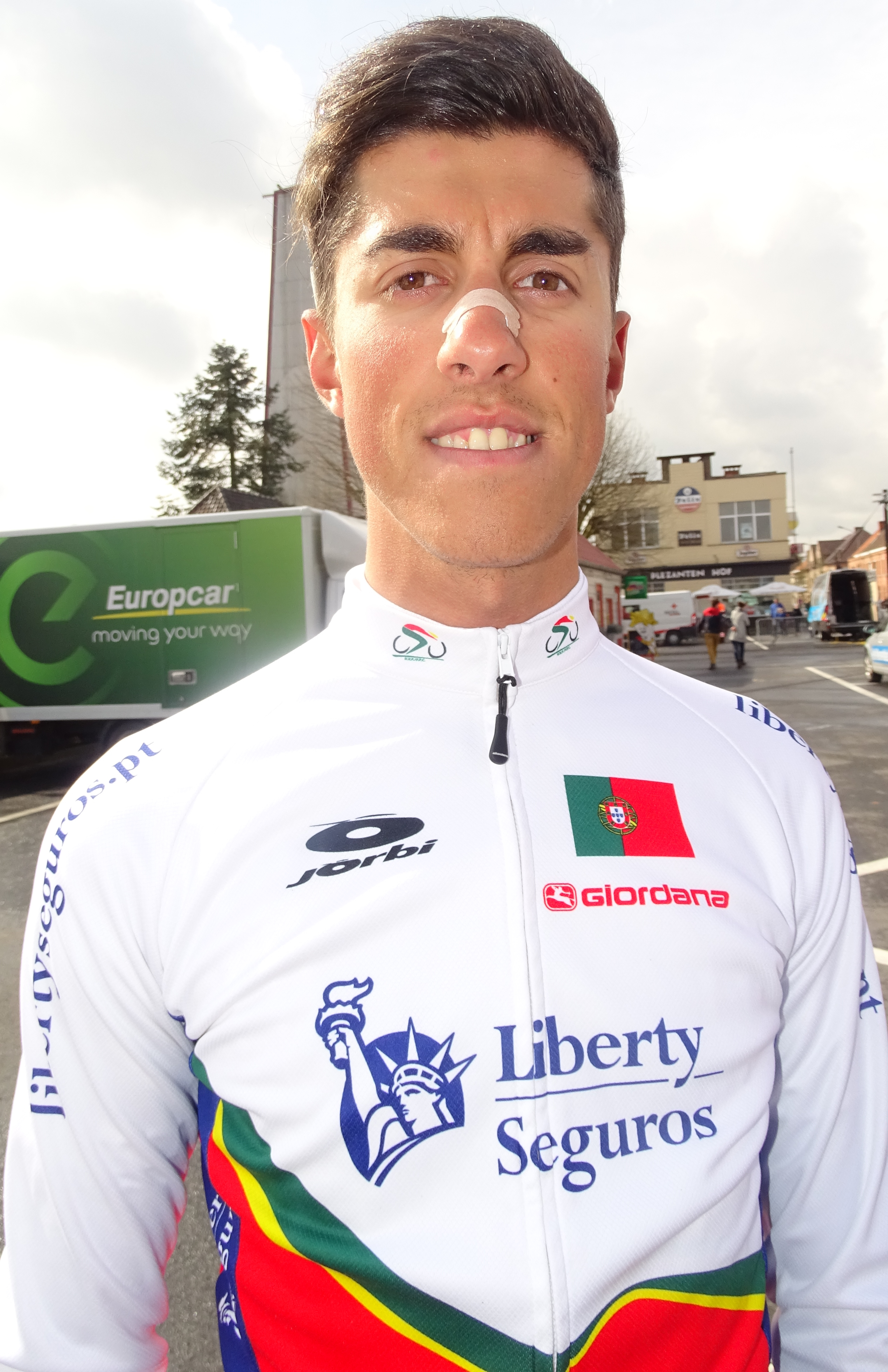
- Gomes at the 2015 Ronde van Vlaanderen Beloften

Personal information
- Full name: Luís Gabriel Silva Gomes
- Born: 7 May 1994 (age 32) Vila Nova de Gaia, Portugal

Cycling career
- Sport: Cycling
- Current team: GI Group Holding–Simoldes–UDO
- Discipline: Road
- Role: Rider

Amateur teams
- 2009–2012: Silva & Vinha–ADR Ases de Penafiel
- 2013–2014: Maia–Bicicletas Andrade
- 2015–2016: Liberty Seguros–Carglass

Professional teams
- 2017–2019: Rádio Popular–Boavista
- 2020–: Kelly–InOutBuild–UDO

Luís Gabriel Silva Gomes (born 7 May 1994 in Vila Nova de Gaia) is a Portuguese cyclist, who currently rides for UCI Continental team GI Group Holding–Simoldes–UDO.

== Major results ==
2015
1st Young rider classification Troféu Alpendre Internacional do Guadiana
4th Overall Volta a Portugal do Futuro

1st Stage 4

2016
1st Stage 2 Volta a Portugal do Futuro
2019
Volta a Portugal

1st Mountains classification
1st Stage 7

2020
Volta a Portugal

1st Points classification
1st Stage 1

2nd Overall Troféu Joaquim Agostinho
4th Road race, National Road Championships
2021
9th Classica da Arrábida
10th Overall Volta ao Alentejo
2022
1st Stage 7 Volta a Portugal
2nd Clássica da Arrábida
2023
1st Clássica Viana do Castelo
2nd Clássica da Primavera
2nd Clássica Aldeias do Xisto
2nd Overall Grande Prémio Abimota

1st Stage 2

2nd Overall GP Douro Internacional
3rd Overall GP Anicolor
3rd Road race, National Road Championships
6th Overall Grande Prémio O Jogo

1st Points classification

2024
3rd Road race, National Road Championships
