= 2022 Groupama–FDJ season =

Groupama–FDJ
- 2022 season
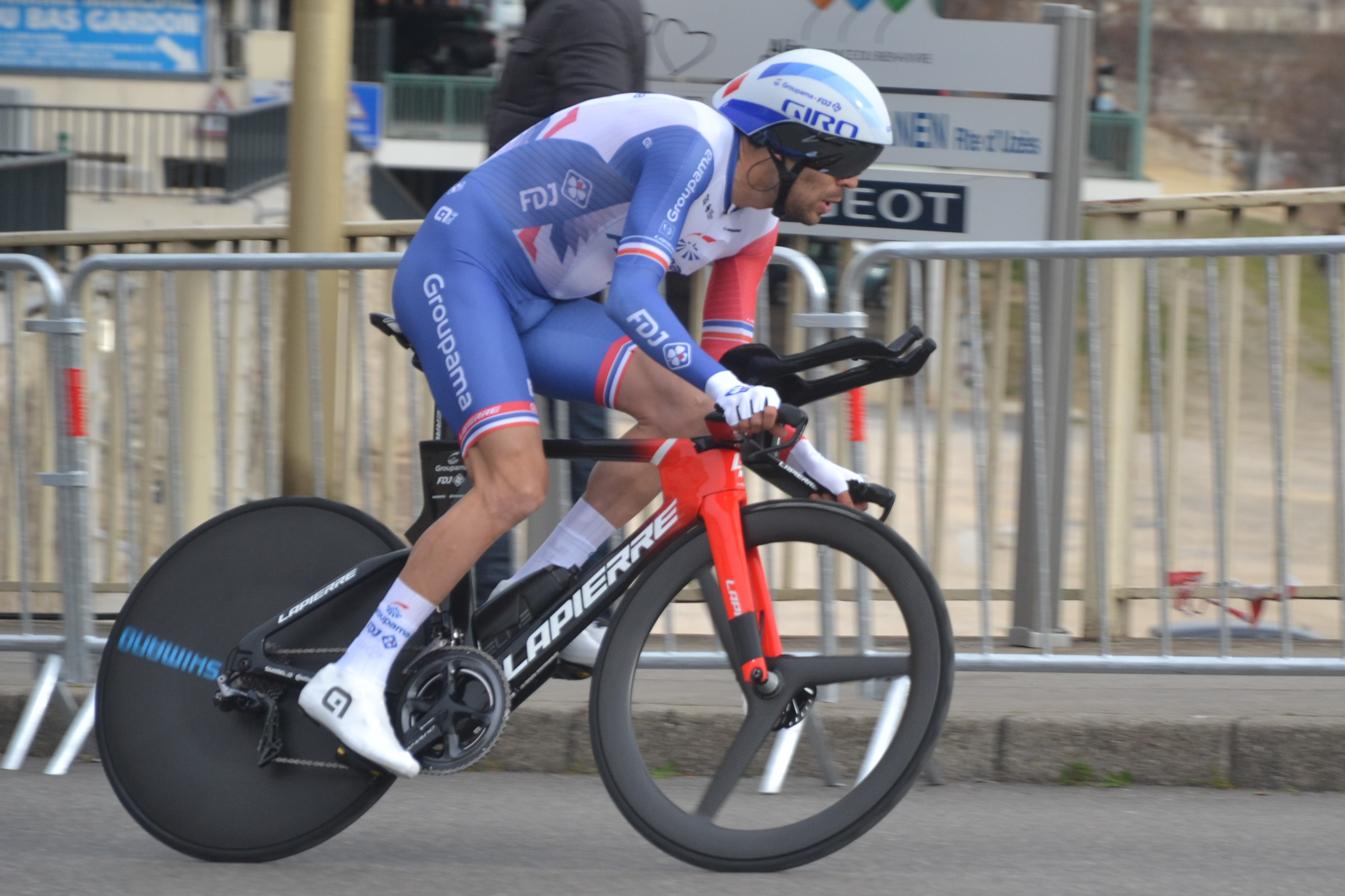
- Thibaut Pinot on Étoile de Bessèges
- UCI code: GFC
- Status: UCI WorldTeam
- Manager: Marc Madiot (FRA)
- Main sponsor(s): Française des Jeux; Groupama
- Based: France
- Bicycles: Lapierre
- Groupset: Shimano

Season victories
- Stage race stages: 5
- Jersey

The 2022 season for Groupama–FDJ is the 26th season in the team's existence and the fifth under the current name. The team has been a UCI WorldTeam since 2005, when the tier was first established. They use Lapierre bicycles, Shimano drivetrain, Shimano wheels and Alé clothing.

== Team roster ==
As of 23 January 2022.

Rider	Date of birth
Bruno Armirail (FRA)	11 April 1994 (aged 27)
Lewis Askey (GBR)	4 May 2001 (aged 20)
Matteo Badilatti (SUI)	30 July 1992 (aged 29)
Clément Davy (FRA)	17 July 1998 (aged 23)
Arnaud Démare (FRA)	26 August 1991 (aged 30)
Antoine Duchesne (CAN)	12 September 1991 (aged 30)
David Gaudu (FRA)	10 October 1996 (aged 25)
Kévin Geniets (LUX)	9 January 1997 (aged 24)
Jacopo Guarnieri (ITA)	14 August 1987 (aged 34)
Ignatas Konovalovas (LIT)	8 December 1985 (aged 36)
Stefan Küng (SUI)	16 November 1993 (aged 28)
Mathieu Ladagnous (FRA)	12 December 1984 (aged 37)
Olivier Le Gac (FRA)	27 August 1993 (aged 28)
Fabian Lienhard (SUI)	3 September 1993 (aged 28)

Rider	Date of birth
Tobias Ludvigsson (SWE)	22 February 1991 (aged 30)
Valentin Madouas (FRA)	12 July 1996 (aged 25)
Rudy Molard (FRA)	17 September 1989 (aged 32)
Quentin Pacher (FRA)	6 January 1992 (aged 29)
Thibaut Pinot (FRA)	29 May 1990 (aged 31)
Sébastien Reichenbach (SUI)	28 May 1989 (aged 32)
Anthony Roux (FRA)	18 April 1987 (aged 34)
Miles Scotson (AUS)	18 January 1994 (aged 27)
Ramon Sinkeldam (NED)	9 February 1989 (aged 32)
Jake Stewart (GBR)	2 October 1999 (aged 22)
Michael Storer (AUS)	28 February 1997 (aged 24)
Attila Valter (HUN)	12 June 1998 (aged 23)
Lars van den Berg (NED)	7 July 1998 (aged 23)
Bram Welten (NED)	29 March 1997 (aged 24)

Riders who joined the team for the 2022 season

Rider	2021 team
Lewis Askey	neo-pro (Équipe Continentale Groupama–FDJ)
Quentin Pacher	B&B Hotels p/b KTM
Paul Penhoët (Note: Penhoet will join from the Équipe Continentale Groupama–FDJ on 1 August.)	neo-pro (Équipe Continentale Groupama–FDJ)
Michael Storer	Team DSM
Bram Welten	Arkéa–Samsic

Riders who left the team during or after the 2021 season

Rider	2022 team
William Bonnet	Retired
Mickaël Delage	Retired
Alexys Brunel	UAE Team Emirates
Simon Guglielmi	Arkéa–Samsic
Romain Seigle	
Benjamin Thomas	Cofidis

== Season victories ==
Date	Race	Competition	Rider	Country	Location	Ref.
17 February	Volta ao Algarve, Stage 2	UCI ProSeries	David Gaudu (FRA)	Portugal	Alto da Fóia (Monchique)	
20 February	Tour des Alpes-Maritimes et du Var, Team classification	UCI Europe Tour	(Note: The riders in the squad were Lewis Askey, Kévin Geniets, Valentin Madouas, Thibaut Pinot, Anthony Roux, and Michael Storer.)	France		
13 March	Paris–Nice, Mountains classification	UCI World Tour	Valentin Madouas (FRA)	France		
22 April	Tour of the Alps, Stage 5	UCI ProSeries	Thibaut Pinot (FRA)	Austria	Lienz	
22 April	Tour of the Alps, Sprint classification	UCI ProSeries	Thibaut Pinot (FRA)	Italy/Austria		
22 April	Tour of the Alps, Team classification	UCI ProSeries	(Note: The riders in the squad were Matteo Badilatti, Lenny Martinez, Thibaut Pinot, Michael Storer, Reuben Thompson, and Attila Valter.)	Italy/Austria		
8 May	Four Days of Dunkirk, Young rider classification	UCI ProSeries	Jake Stewart (GBR)	France		
11 May	Giro d'Italia, Stage 5	UCI World Tour	Arnaud Démare (FRA)	Italy	Messina	
12 May	Giro d'Italia, Stage 6	UCI World Tour	Arnaud Démare (FRA)	Italy	Scalea (Riviera dei Cedri)	
20 May	Giro d'Italia, Stage 13	UCI World Tour	Arnaud Démare (FRA)	Italy	Cuneo	
29 May	Giro d'Italia, Points classification	UCI World Tour	Arnaud Démare (FRA)	Italy		
29 May	Boucles de la Mayenne, Young rider classification	UCI ProSeries	Jake Stewart (GBR)	France		

== National, Continental, and World Champions ==
Date	Discipline	Jersey	Rider	Country	Location	Ref.
