= Daniel Freitas (cyclist) =

Portuguese cyclist

Personal information
- Full name: Daniel Alexandre Loureiro Silva Freitas
- Born: 10 May 1991 (age 35) Vila Nova de Gaia, Portugal
- Height: 1.71 m (5 ft 7 in)
- Weight: 64 kg (141 lb)

Cycling career
- Sport: Cycling
- Current team: Suspended
- Discipline: Road
- Role: Rider

Amateur teams
- 2013: Anicolor
- 2015: Anicolor

Professional teams
- 2011–2012: Barbot–Efapel
- 2014: LA Alumínios–Antarte
- 2016–2018: W52 / FC Porto / Porto Canal
- 2019–2020: Miranda–Mortágua
- 2021–2022: Rádio Popular–Boavista

Daniel Alexandre Loureiro Silva Freitas (born 10 May 1991) is a Portuguese cyclist, who last rode for UCI Continental team Feira dos Sofás–Boavista.

On 2 May 2023, he received a three-year ban by UCI for doping.

== Biography ==
In 2007, Daniel Freitas became a double Portuguese Champion in the cadet category. During the Volta a Portugal Juniors in 2009, he tested positive twice for morphine, a prohibited substance. Initially declared the winner of the race, he was later disqualified in favor of his teammate Rafael Reis and was suspended for 18 months by his federation, a penalty that was eventually reduced.

After serving his suspension, he turned professional in 2011 with the Portuguese UCI Continental team Barbot–Efapel. With this team, he won the Circuito da Malveira in 2012, a notable event on the Portuguese national calendar. Returning to the amateur ranks in 2013, he won three races with the Anicolor club, including the Grand Prix of Mortágua. He also finished third in the Clássica de Pascua and seventh in the Volta a Portugal do Futuro.

In 2016, he rejoined the professional peloton with the W52 / FC Porto / Porto Canal team. He first took fourth place in the Clássica da Primavera in March, and then distinguished himself in Spain at the Vuelta a La Rioja, where he finished just off the podium in fourth place. Returning to the Portuguese circuit, he took third place in the opening stage of the Volta à Bairrada, won by his teammate Samuel Caldeira. Later in the spring, he finished second in the Volta à Albergaria and third in the Troféu Concelhio Oliveira de Azeméis, both events of the Portuguese Cup series.

== Major results ==
2009
2nd Time trial, National Junior Road Championships
5th Road race, UCI Junior Road World Championships
5th Overall GP Général Patton
2015
9th Overall Troféu Alpendre Internacional do Guadiana
2016
4th Vuelta a La Rioja
2017
10th Vuelta a La Rioja
2021
3rd Overall Grand Prix Abimota
9th Overall Volta ao Alentejo
2022
1st Stage 2 Troféu Joaquim Agostinho
4th Overall Volta ao Alentejo
7th Clássica da Arrábida
