= Héctor Sáez =

Spanish cyclist

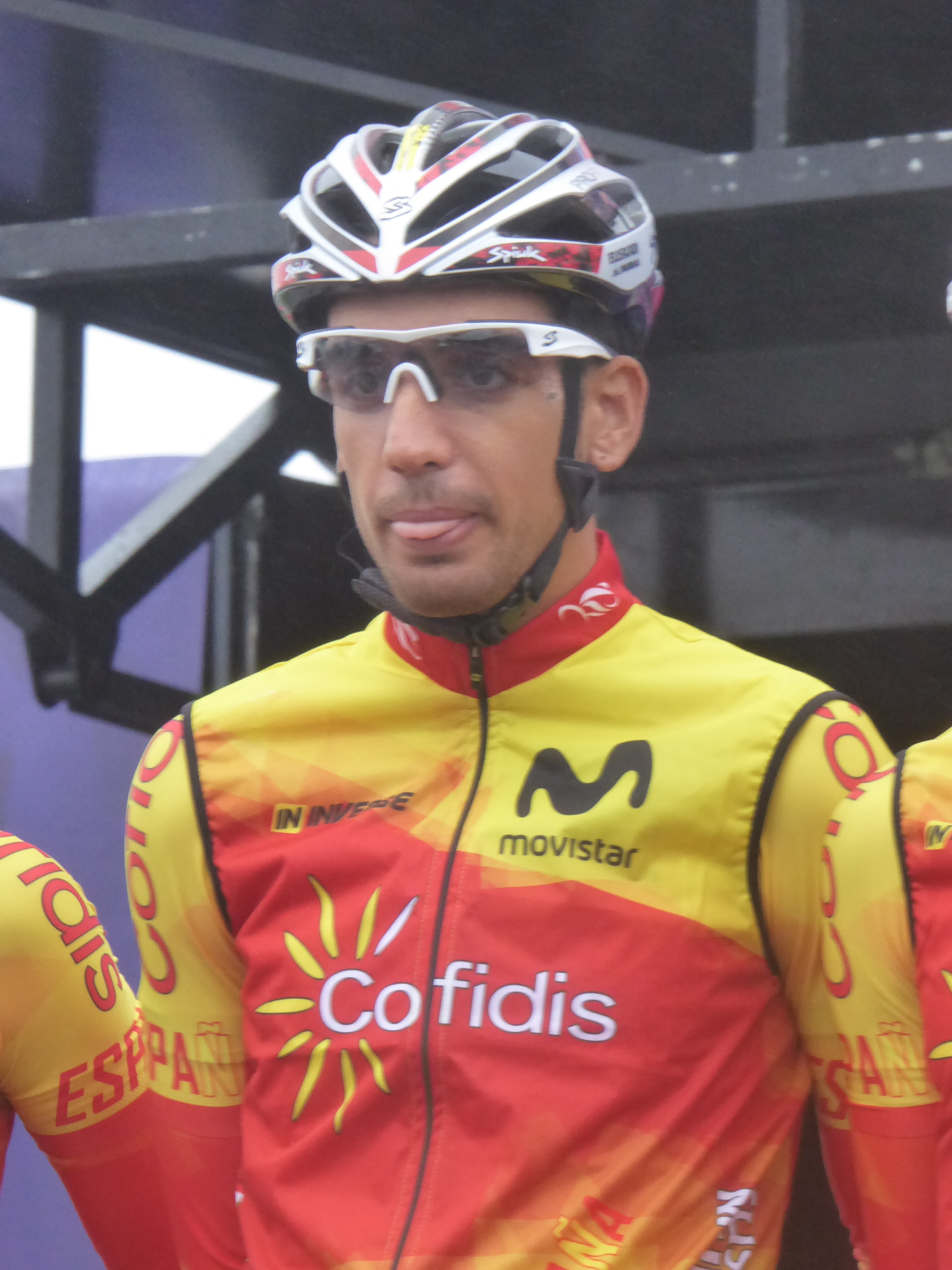
- Sáez at the 2018 European Road Cycling Championships

Personal information
- Full name: Héctor Sáez Benito
- Born: 6 November 1993 (age 32) Caudete, Spain
- Height: 1.85 m (6 ft 1 in)
- Weight: 75 kg (165 lb)

Cycling career
- Sport: Cycling
- Discipline: Road
- Role: Rider

Amateur teams
- 2012–2013: Seguros Bilbao
- 2014–2015: Club Ciclista Burunda
- 2023: Fonte Nova–Felgueiras

Professional teams
- 2015–2017: Caja Rural–Seguros RGA
- 2018–2019: Euskadi–Murias
- 2020–2021: Caja Rural–Seguros RGA
- 2022: Glassdrive–Q8–Anicolor

Héctor Sáez Benito (born 6 November 1993) is a Spanish cyclist, who last rode for amateur team Fonte Nova–Felgueiras. He has competed in four editions of the Vuelta a España.

== Major results ==
2010
1st Road race, National Junior Road Championships
2011
2nd Time trial, National Junior Road Championships
2014
10th Overall Volta a Portugal do Futuro
2015
2nd Gran Premio Macario
2019
1st Stage 6 Volta a Portugal
7th Overall Vuelta a Castilla y León
Combativity award Stage 13 Vuelta a España

=== Grand Tour general classification results timeline ===
Grand Tour	2017	2018	2019	2020
Giro d'Italia	—	—	—	—
Tour de France	—	—	—	—
Vuelta a España	76	85	82	DNF

Legend
—	Did not compete
DNF	Did not finish
