= Hugo Nunes =

Portuguese cyclist

Personal information
- Full name: Hugo Rafael Andrade Nunes
- Born: 17 November 1996 (age 29) Paços de Ferreira, Portugal
- Height: 1.75 m (5 ft 9 in)
- Weight: 64 kg (141 lb)

Cycling career
- Sport: Cycling
- Current team: Credibom / LA Alumínios / Marcos Car
- Discipline: Road
- Role: Rider

Amateur teams
- 2015: Maia–Ribeiros Bike Shop
- 2016: Anicolor
- 2017: Miranda–Mortágua

Professional teams
- 2018: Miranda–Mortágua
- 2019–2024: Rádio Popular–Boavista
- 2025–: Credibom / LA Alumínios / Marcos Car

Hugo Rafael Andrade Nunes (born 17 November 1996) is a Portuguese cyclist, who currently rides for UCI Continental team Credibom / LA Alumínios / Marcos Car.

== Major results ==
2016
2nd Road race, National Under-23 Road Championships
8th Overall Volta a Portugal do Futuro
2017
6th Overall Volta a Portugal do Futuro
2018
4th Road race, National Under-23 Road Championships
2020
1st Mountains classification, Volta a Portugal
2022
2nd Overall Grande Prémio Abimota

1st Stage 2

2023
2nd Clássica da Primavera
6th Overall Grande Prémio Jornal de Notícias
2025 (1 pro win)
Volta a Portugal

1st Mountains classification
1st Stage 3

5th Road race, National Road Championships
2026 (1)
1st Stage 2 GP Beiras e Serra da Estrela
