= Joni Brandão =

Portuguese bicycle racer

Personal information
- Full name: Joni Silva Brandão
- Born: November 20, 1989 (age 36) Travanca, Portugal
- Height: 1.76 m (5 ft 9 in)
- Weight: 64 kg (141 lb)

Cycling career
- Sport: Cycling
- Current team: Suspended
- Discipline: Road
- Role: Rider

Professional teams
- 2012: Burgos BH–Castilla y Leon
- 2013–2016: Efapel–Glassdrive
- 2017–2018: Sporting / Tavira
- 2019–2020: Efapel
- 2021–2022: W52 / FC Porto

Joni Silva Brandão (born 20 November 1989) is a Portuguese cyclist who most recently rode for UCI Continental team W52 / FC Porto.

On 2 May 2023, he received a six-year ban by UCI for doping.

== Major results ==
2008
1st Stage 5 Tour of Galicia
2010
3rd Road race, National Under-23 Road Championships
2011
1st Overall Volta a Portugal do Futuro

1st Stage 1

2013
1st Road race, National Road Championships
6th Overall Tour d'Azerbaïdjan
2014
4th Overall Volta a Portugal
National Road Championships

5th Road race
5th Time trial

8th Klasika Primavera
2015
2nd Road race, National Road Championships
2nd Overall Volta a Portugal
8th Overall Vuelta a la Comunidad de Madrid
2016
1st Overall Volta Internacional Cova da Beira

1st Stage 3

3rd Overall Vuelta a Castilla y León
5th Overall Volta a Portugal

1st Mountains classification

6th Road race, National Road Championships
2017
6th Clássica Aldeias do Xisto
7th Clássica da Arrábida
2018
2nd Road race, National Road Championships
2nd Overall Volta a Portugal
2nd Clássica Aldeias do Xisto
3rd Overall GP Beiras e Serra da Estrela
3rd Overall Troféu Joaquim Agostinho
6th Road race, Mediterranean Games
2019
2nd Overall Volta a Portugal
3rd Overall GP Beiras e Serra da Estrela

1st Stage 3

5th Road race, National Road Championships
2020
4th Overall Volta a Portugal

1st Stage 4

2021
4th Overall Volta a Portugal
9th Overall Volta ao Algarve

== See also ==
- Doping in sport
- List of doping cases in cycling
