= 2022 Circuit Franco-Belge =

2022 Eurométropole Tour
2022 UCI ProSeries
- Event poster with previous winner Fabio Jakobsen

Race details
- Dates: 10 August 2022
- Stages: 1
- Distance: 175.2 km (108.9 mi)
- Winning time: 4h 12' 13"

Results
	Winner	Alexander Kristoff (NOR)	(Intermarché–Wanty–Gobert Matériaux)
	Second	Dries van Gestel (BEL)	(Team TotalEnergies)
	Third	Victor Campenaerts (BEL)	(Lotto–Soudal)

The 2022 Circuit Franco-Belge was the 81st edition of the Circuit Franco-Belge and the sixth edition since it became a one day race. It was held on 10 August 2022 as part of the 2022 UCI ProSeries calendar. This edition was the race's second in the UCI ProSeries.

== Teams ==
8 of the 19 UCI WorldTeams, seven UCI ProTeams, and five UCI Continental teams made up the 20 teams that participated in the race. In total, 139 riders started the race.

UCI WorldTeams

- AG2R Citroën Team
- Cofidis
- Intermarché–Wanty–Gobert Matériaux
- Israel–Premier Tech
- Lotto–Soudal
- Quick-Step Alpha Vinyl Team
- Team DSM
- Trek–Segafredo

UCI ProTeams

- Alpecin–Deceuninck
- B&B Hotels–KTM
- Bingoal Pauwels Sauces WB
- Sport Vlaanderen–Baloise
- Arkéa–Samsic
- Team TotalEnergies
- Uno-X Pro Cycling Team

UCI Continental Teams

- Bolton Equities Black Spoke Pro Cycling
- Tarteletto–Isorex
- Geofco–Doltcini Matériel-vélo.com
- VolkerWessels Cycling Team
- Minerva Cycling Team

== Result ==
Result
Rank	Rider	Team	Time
1	Alexander Kristoff (NOR)	Intermarché–Wanty–Gobert Matériaux	4h 12' 13"
2	Dries Van Gestel (BEL)	Team TotalEnergies	+ 0"
3	Victor Campenaerts (BEL)	Lotto–Soudal	+ 0"
4	Jasper De Buyst (BEL)	Lotto–Soudal	+ 13"
5	Alberto Dainese (ITA)	Team DSM	+ 15"
6	Arnaud De Lie (BEL)	Lotto–Soudal	+ 15"
7	Julien Simon (FRA)	Team TotalEnergies	+ 15"
8	Milan Menten (BEL)	Bingoal Pauwels Sauces WB	+ 15"
9	Greg Van Avermaet (BEL)	AG2R Citroën Team	+ 15"
10	Bryan Coquard (FRA)	Cofidis	+ 15"
