= Cyril Barthe =

French racing cyclist (born 1996)

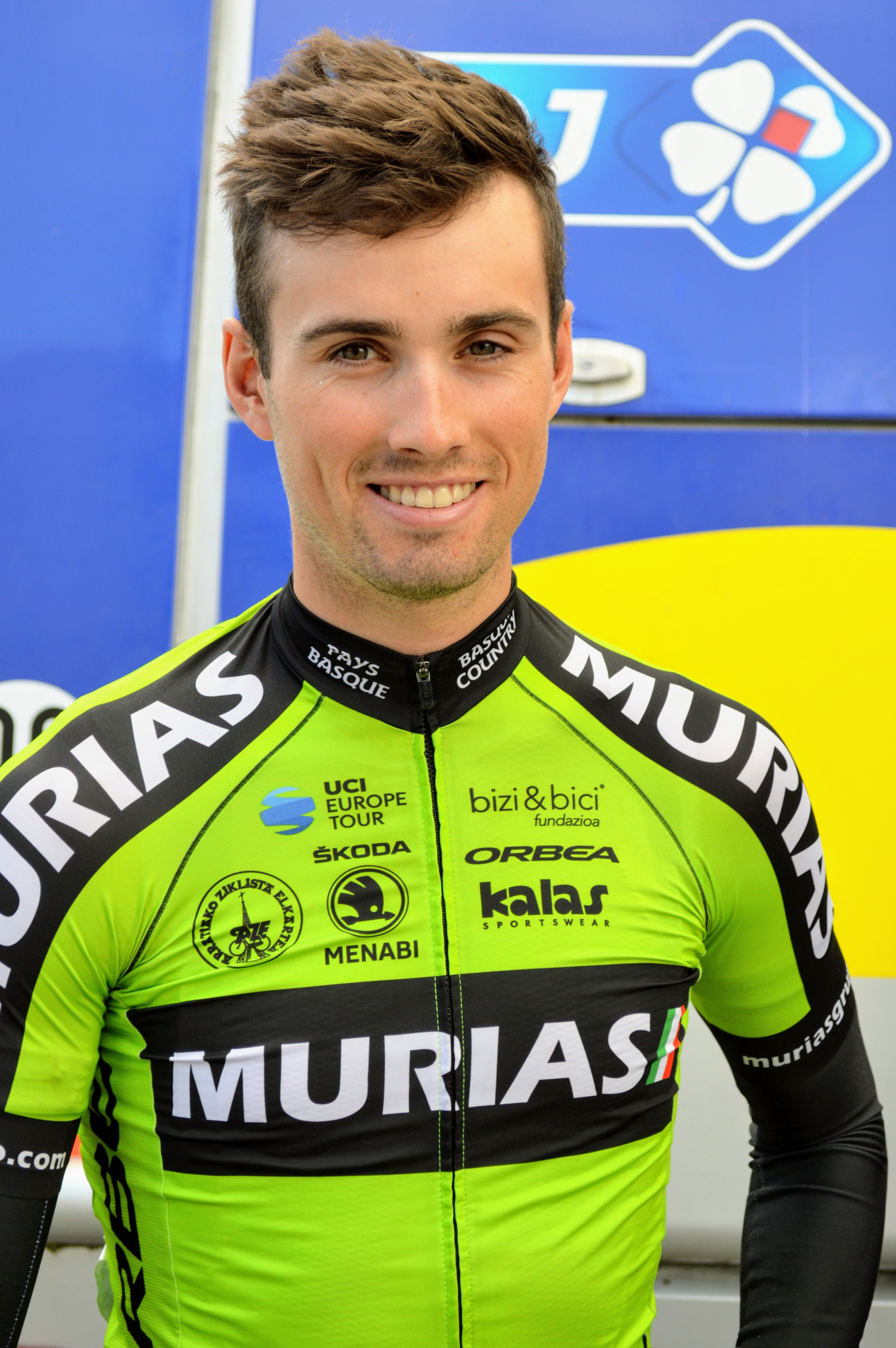
- Barthe in 2019

Personal information
- Full name: Cyril Barthe
- Born: 14 February 1996 (age 30) Sauveterre-de-Béarn, France
- Height: 1.84 m (6 ft 0 in)
- Weight: 69 kg (152 lb)

Cycling career
- Sport: Cycling
- Current team: Groupama–FDJ United
- Discipline: Road
- Role: Rider
- Rider type: Puncheur

Amateur teams
- 2015–2017: Fundación Euskadi–EDP
- 2017: Euskadi Basque Country–Murias (stagiaire)

Professional teams
- 2018–2019: Euskadi–Murias
- 2020–2022: B&B Hotels–Vital Concept
- 2023: Burgos BH
- 2024–: Groupama–FDJ

Cyril Barthe (born 14 February 1996) is a French cyclist, who currently rides for UCI WorldTeam Groupama–FDJ United. In August 2019, he was named in the startlist for the 2019 Vuelta a España. In August 2020, he was named in the startlist for the 2020 Tour de France.

== Major results ==
2017
Volta a Portugal do Futuro

1st Stages 1 & 4

2018
1st Road race, National Under-23 Road Championships
5th Overall Grande Prémio de Portugal N2

1st Young rider classification

10th Overall Troféu Joaquim Agostinho

1st Stage 2

2019
9th Classica da Arrabida
10th Circuito de Getxo
2021
9th Tour du Finistère
9th Paris–Chauny
9th Route Adélie
2022
6th Tour du Finistère
2023
1st Stage 3 Volta ao Alentejo
10th Cholet-Pays de la Loire
2025
1st Points classification, Route d'Occitanie
8th Cholet Agglo Tour

=== Grand Tour general classification results timeline ===
| Grand Tour | 2019 | 2020 | 2021 | 2022 | 2023 | 2024 | 2025 |
|---|---|---|---|---|---|---|---|
| Giro d'Italia | — | — | — | — | — | 72 | — |
| Tour de France | — | 96 | 88 | 80 | — | — | DNF |
| Vuelta a España | 86 | — | — | — | 108 | — | — |

Legend
| — | Did not compete |
| DNF | Did not finish |
