= 2022 Milano–Torino =

103rd edition of the Milano–Torino cycling classic

- 2022 UCI ProSeries

Race details
- Dates: 16 March 2022
- Stages: 1
- Distance: 199 km (123.7 mi)
- Winning time: 4h 31' 22"

Results
	Winner	Mark Cavendish (GBR)	(Quick-Step Alpha Vinyl Team)
	Second	Nacer Bouhanni (FRA)	(Arkéa–Samsic)
	Third	Alexander Kristoff (NOR)	(Intermarché–Wanty–Gobert Matériaux)

The 2022 Milano–Torino was the 103rd edition of the Milano–Torino cycling classic. It was held on 16 March 2022 as a category 1.Pro race on the 2022 UCI ProSeries calendar. The race, which is usually held in the autumn, was held in March for the first time since 2005.

The race began in Magenta, on the outskirts of Milan, and finished in Rivoli, on the outskirts of Turin. The slightly undulating route was 199 kilometres (124 mi) long but was still expected to favour the sprinters.

== Teams ==
Fourteen of the 18 UCI WorldTeams and six UCI ProTeams made up the 20 teams that participated in the race. Of these teams, 15 entered a full squad of seven riders; AG2R Citroën Team, Alpecin–Fenix, Cofidis, and Team BikeExchange–Jayco each entered six riders, while Ineos Grenadiers was the only team to enter five riders. In total, there were 134 riders entered into the race, though only 131 started; of those riders, 129 finished.

UCI WorldTeams

- AG2R Citroën Team
- Astana Qazaqstan Team
- Bora–Hansgrohe
- Cofidis
- EF Education–EasyPost
- Ineos Grenadiers
- Intermarché–Wanty–Gobert Matériaux
- Israel–Premier Tech
- Movistar Team
- Quick-Step Alpha Vinyl Team
- Team BikeExchange–Jayco
- Team DSM
- Trek–Segafredo
- UAE Team Emirates

UCI ProTeams

- Alpecin–Fenix
- Arkéa–Samsic
- Bardiani–CSF–Faizanè
- Drone Hopper–Androni Giocattoli
- Eolo–Kometa
- Team TotalEnergies

== Result ==
Result (1–10)
Rank	Rider	Team	Time
1	Mark Cavendish (GBR)	Quick-Step Alpha Vinyl Team	4h 31' 22"
2	Nacer Bouhanni (FRA)	Arkéa–Samsic	+ 0"
3	Alexander Kristoff (NOR)	Intermarché–Wanty–Gobert Matériaux	+ 0"
4	Max Kanter (GER)	Movistar Team	+ 0"
5	Peter Sagan (SVK)	Team TotalEnergies	+ 0"
6	Andrea Vendrame (ITA)	AG2R Citroën Team	+ 0"
7	Michael Mørkøv (DEN)	Quick-Step Alpha Vinyl Team	+ 0"
8	Ben Swift (GBR)	Ineos Grenadiers	+ 0"
9	Simone Consonni (ITA)	Cofidis	+ 0"
10	Biniam Girmay (ERI)	Intermarché–Wanty–Gobert Matériaux	+ 0"
