= João Rodrigues (cyclist) =

Portuguese cyclist

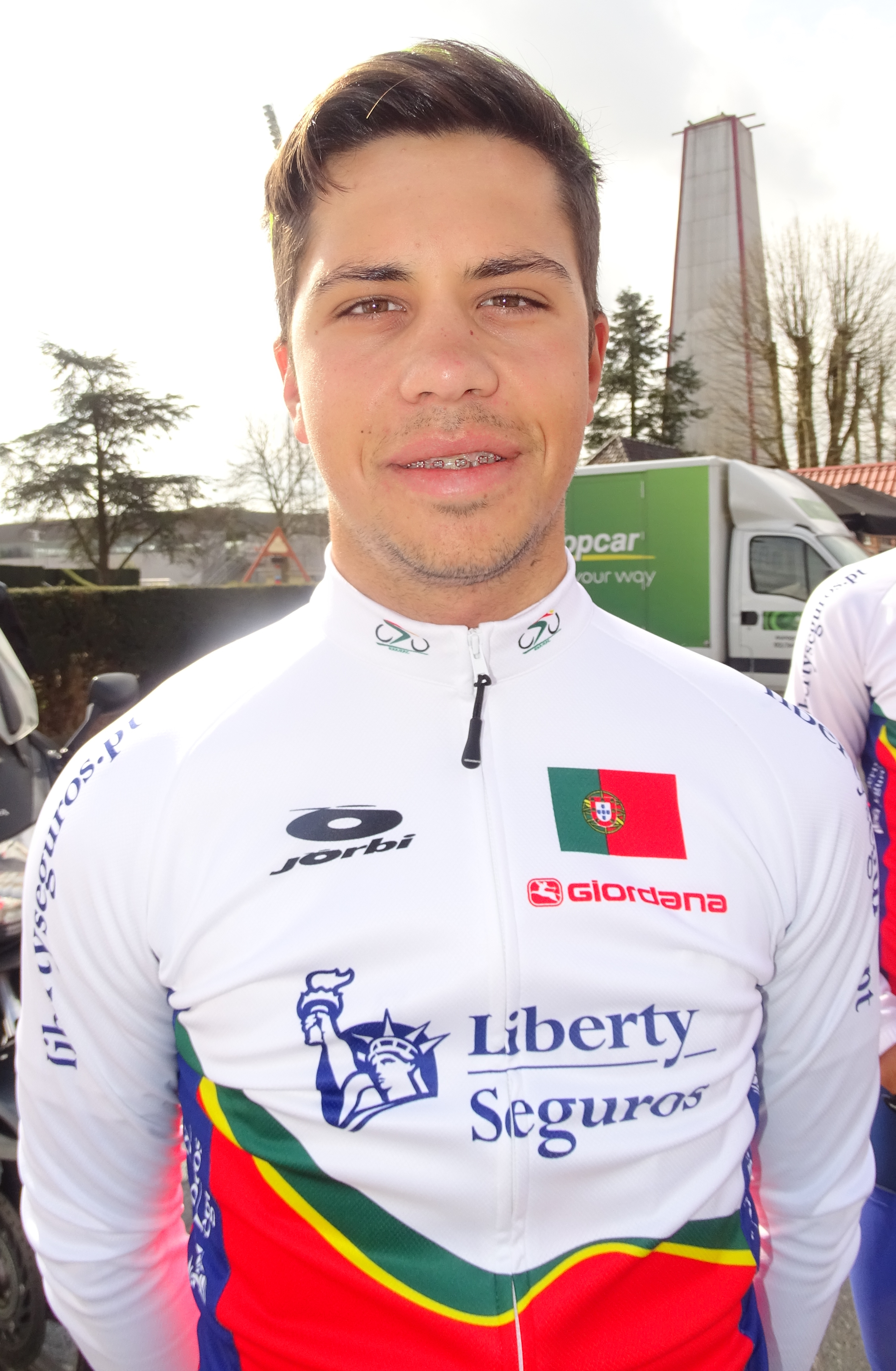
- Rodrigues in 2015

Personal information
- Full name: João Pedro Lourenço Rodrigues
- Born: 15 November 1994 (age 31) Faro, Portugal
- Height: 1.75 m (5 ft 9 in)
- Weight: 60 kg (132 lb)

Cycling career
- Sport: Cycling
- Current team: Suspended
- Discipline: Road
- Role: Rider

Amateur team
- 2004–2012: CC Tavira

Professional teams
- 2013–2015: Carmim–Tavira
- 2016–2022: W52 / FC Porto / Porto Canal

Major wins
- Stage races Volta ao Algarve (2021)

João Pedro Lourenço Rodrigues (born 15 November 1994 in Faro) is a Portuguese road racing cyclist who last rode for UCI Continental team W52 / FC Porto.

On 4 October 2022, he received a seven-year ban by UCI for doping.

== Major results ==
2017
1st Mountains classification Vuelta a Castilla y León
2018
7th Overall Volta a Portugal
2019
1st Overall Volta ao Alentejo

1st Stage 5 (ITT)

1st Overall Volta a Portugal

1st Stages 4 & 10 (ITT)

4th Clássica da Arrábida
9th Overall Volta ao Algarve
2020
7th Overall Volta a Portugal
2021
1st Overall Volta ao Algarve
9th Overall Volta a Portugal

== See also ==
- Doping in sport
- List of doping cases in cycling
