= GI Group Holding–Simoldes–UDO =

Portuguese cycling team

Team information
- UCI code: GSU
- Registered: Portugal
- Founded: 2015
- Discipline: Road
- Status: Under-23 (2015–2017); Continental (2018–)
- Bicycles: Orbea
- Website: Team home page

Key personnel
- General manager: Manuel Correia
- Team manager: Luís Pinheiro

Team name history
- 2015–2017 2018 2019 2020 2020–2024 2024–: Liberty Seguros–Carglass; Liberty Seguros–Carglass (LSC); UD Oliveirense–InOutBuild (UIO); Kelly–InOutBuild–UD Oliveirense (KIU); Kelly–Simoldes–UDO; GI Group Holding–Simoldes–UDO
Jersey

GI Group Holding–Simoldes–UDO (UCI team code: GSU) is a Portuguese cycling team based in Oliveira de Azeméis, that holds a UCI Continental team licence. The cycling team is affiliated with União Desportiva Oliveirense (UDO), the largest multisports club of Oliveira de Azeméis.

== History ==
Manuel Correia and Luís Pinheiro, both former road bicycle racers, founded the Bike Clube de Portugal in 2014 on the initiative to develop young riders. The club, with backing from insurance company Liberty Seguros and vehicle glass repair company Carglass, started racing the following year in the Under-23 rankings.

In 2018 the team gained UCI Continental status.

== Team roster ==
As of 23 February 2022.

Rider	Date of birth
Daniel Dias (POR)	29 July 2001 (age 25)
António Ferreira (POR)	3 April 2000 (age 26)
César Fonte (POR)	10 December 1986 (age 39)
Luís Gomes (POR)	7 May 1994 (age 32)
Hélder Gonçalves (POR)	16 June 2000 (age 26)

Rider	Date of birth
Tiago Leal (POR)	22 October 1999 (age 26)
Francisco Moreira (POR)	11 March 1999 (age 27)
Carlos Petiz (POR)	15 May 2003 (age 23)
Afonso Silva (POR)	22 March 2000 (age 26)
José Sousa (POR)	16 July 1999 (age 27)

== Major wins ==
2015
Portuguese National Track Scratch race, Luís Gomes
Portuguese National Track Points race, Luís Gomes
Portuguese National Track Omnium, Rui Oliveira
Stage 4 Volta a Portugal do Futuro, Luís Gomes
2016
Portuguese U23 Time Trial, Gaspar Gonçalves
Stage 2 Volta a Portugal do Futuro, José Fernandes
2017
Portuguese U23 Time Trial, José Fernandes
Overall Volta a Portugal do Futuro, José Fernandes

Stage 2, José Fernandes

2020
Portuguese U23 Time Trial, Guilherme Mota
Stage 1 Volta a Portugal, Luís Gomes
