= Daniel Mestre =

Portuguese bicycle racer

Personal information
- Full name: Daniel José Pereira Mestre
- Born: 1 April 1986 (age 40) Almodôvar, Portugal
- Height: 1.75 m (5 ft 9 in)
- Weight: 65 kg (143 lb)

Cycling career
- Sport: Cycling
- Current team: Suspended
- Discipline: Road
- Role: Rider

Amateur teams
- 2006: Clube Desportivo Os Águias–Celta
- 2007–2008: Duja–Tavira U23

Professional teams
- 2009–2015: Palmeiras–Resort–Tavira
- 2016–2018: Efapel
- 2019–2022: W52 / FC Porto

Daniel José Pereira Mestre (born 1 April 1986) is a Portuguese cyclist, who last rode for UCI Continental team W52 / FC Porto.

On 4 October 2022, he received a three-year ban by UCI for doping.

== Major results ==
2011
10th 4th Gp Credito Agricola Da Costa Azul
10th Overall Volta ao Alentejo
2014
1st Stage 2 Tour du Maroc
5th Overall Volta ao Alentejo
2016
Volta a Portugal

1st Stages 1 & 9

2017
1st Stage 3 Troféu Joaquim Agostinho
2018
1st Clássica Aldeias do Xisto
8th Overall Vuelta a Castilla y León
9th Overall GP Beiras e Serra da Estrela
2019
1st stage 2 GP Beiras e Serra da Estrela
Volta a Portugal

1st Stage 3
1st Mountains classification

2020
2nd Road race, National Road Championships
2021
5th Overall Volta ao Alentejo

1st Stage 4

== See also ==
- Doping in sport
- List of doping cases in cycling
