= Simoldes =

Simoldes is a Portuguese mould maker company headquartered in Oliveira de Azeméis.

Claimed to be Europe's largest mould maker, Simoldes Group Mould Division supplies plastic injection moulds for the automotive industry.

Its Simoldes Tool Division is a group of 7 Production Units and 5 Advanced Customer Service offices with Sales and marketing structure centered in the 4 main companies of the group: Simoldes Aços, MDA, IMA and Simoldes Aços Brasil, and with 950 people.

Simoldes Group Mould Division main customers are worldwide automotive suppliers like Renault, Volvo, BMW, Škoda, Saab, General Motors, Ford, Peugeot, Mercedes-Benz, Citroën, Volkswagen, SEAT and other well-known companies like Nokia, Hoover, IBM, Whirlpool, and Philips.

== History ==
The company started on 30 November 1959 with Simoldes Aços foundation. With an amazing capital share of €200 (40 thousand escudos at that time), Mr. António Rodrigues founded this small plant located inside Oliveira de Azeméis. Nowadays the mould division has 6 companies in Portugal and 3 in Brazil (two in Curitiba and one in São Paulo) and, one more in Argentina. The group expanded their facilities to Asia and Eastern Europe following their customers migration and market rules. Simoldes Aços started as a toy and houseware mould maker.

In 1963, the plant location was changed, with the main goal of increasing the business. Later in 1966, following an extensive market research and a precise marketing strategy, the company made its first approach to potential customers through well-known brokers. This was the typical way to handle business in the sixties.

Two years later, the customers approach was changed and the first direct selling method was made in England. In 1974, the company built a new facility that is still operational and considered as the "mother house". At that time, the strongest world companies had frozen their investments due to the economic recession, but Simoldes Aços kept investing on new equipment, experienced people and preparing itself for market demands and consolidation of its image as a mould maker. Meanwhile, the core business was changing - the automotive industry was the main target.

Twenty years later, Mr. Rui Paulo Rodrigues, son of Antonio assumes the 2nd direction of the factory. The company was working mainly for the Automotive suppliers and the demands were so high, that a new company called MDA – Moldes de Azeméis, was created to focus on large size and hi-tech moulds. With the continuous increase of customer requests, a third company (IMA - Indústria de Moldes de Azeméis) started in 1996 for medium size moulds. Later on in 1999, another facility named Simoldes Aços Brasil was built in Curitiba.

Following a very strong sales strategy and customer orientation, several offices were prepared and spread over the most important European target markets. This policy increased the number of customers and consequently, the business volume. To be able to fulfill the new demands, a new company was built, IGM – Indústria Global de Moldes, and two other companies nearby were bought, Mecamolde and Ulmolde.

Through all these years, exports have been made to more than 30 countries, mainly Argentina, France, Germany, Spain, Sweden, Netherlands, United Kingdom, United States and Turkey, among others.
