= António Carvalho (cyclist) =

Portuguese bicycle racer (born 1989)

Personal information
- Full name: António Ferreira Carvalho
- Born: 25 October 1989 (age 36) São Paio de Oleiros, Portugal
- Height: 1.76 m (5 ft 9 in)
- Weight: 62 kg (137 lb)

Cycling career
- Sport: Cycling
- Current team: Suspended
- Discipline: Road
- Role: Rider

Amateur teams
- 2006–2008: Dulcetextil–EC Fernando Carvalho
- 2009: Artesania de Galicia–Cidade de Lugo
- 2010–2012: Mortágua–Basi

Professional teams
- 2013–2014: LA Alumínios–Antarte
- 2015–2019: W52–Quinta da Lixa
- 2020–2022: Efapel
- 2023–2025: ABTF Betão–Feirense

António Ferreira Carvalho (born 25 October 1989) is a Portuguese cyclist, who last rode for UCI Continental team Feirense–Beeceler.

In December 2025, Carvalho was issued with a four-year ban for an anti-doping rule violation relating to abnormalities in his Athlete Biological Passport. The ban expires in November 2029.

== Major results ==
2012
2nd Road race, National Road Championships
7th Overall Volta ao Alentejo
8th Overall Troféu Joaquim Agostinho
2013
1st Overall Volta a Portugal do Futuro

1st Mountains classification
1st Stage 5

10th Overall Volta ao Alentejo

1st Stage 5

2014
1st Mountains classification, Volta a Portugal
9th Overall Vuelta a Castilla y León
2015
1st Overall Grande Prémio Jornal de Notícias

1st Stage 1

6th Overall Volta a Portugal
2016
4th Overall Volta Internacional Cova da Beira
8th Overall Vuelta a Asturias
2017
6th Overall Volta a Portugal
7th Overall Vuelta a Castilla y León
2018
1st Overall Grande Prémio Jornal de Notícias
4th Overall Troféu Joaquim Agostinho
2019 (1 pro win)
National Road Championships

3rd Road race
3rd Time trial

4th Overall Volta a Portugal

1st Stage 9

2020 (1)
1st Stage 7 Volta a Portugal
2021
8th Overall Volta a Portugal
2022 (1)
1st Stage 2 Grande Prémio Jornal de Notícias
3rd Overall Volta a Portugal

1st Stage 9

2023
1st Stages 3 (ITT) & 8 Grande Prémio Jornal de Notícias
3rd Overall Volta a Portugal
