= Leangel Linarez =

Venezuelan cyclist

Personal information
- Full name: Leangel Rubén Linarez Meneses
- Born: 7 August 1997 (age 29) Barinas, Venezuela
- Height: 1.75 m (5 ft 9 in)
- Weight: 74 kg (163 lb)

Cycling career
- Sport: Cycling
- Current team: Tavfer–Ovos Matinados–Mortágua
- Discipline: Road
- Role: Rider
- Rider type: Sprinter

Amateur teams
- 2015–2016: Ona Idt Fona
- 2016–2017: Amo Táchira–Concafé
- 2017: EC Cartucho.es–Magro
- 2017: Fundación Disjogreca On Bike
- 2018–2019: Team Kuota–Construcciones Paulino

Professional teams
- 2019: Miranda–Mortágua (stagiaire)
- 2020–: Tavfer–Mortágua–Ovos Matinados
Medal record
Men's road bicycle racing
Representing Venezuela
Pan American Championships
Gold medal – first place	2024 São José dos Campos	Road race

Leangel Rubén Linarez Meneses (born 7 August 1997) is a Venezuelan cyclist, who currently rides for UCI Continental team Tavfer–Ovos Matinados–Mortágua.

Linarez turned professional in 2020 and took his first victory in a UCI event in 2022, winning stage 3 of the Volta ao Alentejo. In 2023, he won his first fully professional race, taking two stage wins at the Volta a Portugal. In May 2024, he won the Pan American Road Race Championships.

== Major results ==
2013
1st Road race, National Junior Road Championships
2019
1st Gran Premio Macario
1st Gran Premio San Antonio
1st Stage 2 Grande Prémio Jornal de Notícias
2020
2nd Prova de Abertura
2022
1st Prova de Abertura
1st Stage 3 Volta ao Alentejo
3rd Road race, South American Games
2023 (2 pro wins)
1st Grand Tour de Ciclismo de SC
1st Stages 1 & 2 Volta a Portugal
1st Stages 2 & 5 Volta ao Alentejo
2nd Overall Troféu Ribeiro da Silva
2024 (1)
1st Road race, Pan American Road Championships
1st Stages 1 & 4 Grande Prémio Jornal de Notícias
1st Stage 2 Volta ao Alentejo
2025
Bolivarian Games

1st Road race
3rd Team pursuit

1st Stage 7 Vuelta a Venezuela
8th Overall Vuelta del Uruguay

1st Stages 1, 2b & 4

2026 (1)
1st Stage 3 Volta a Portugal
