= 2022 UCI ProSeries =

International road cycling contest

- Third edition of the UCI ProSeries

Details
- Location: Asia, Europe, United States
- Races: 53

The 2022 UCI ProSeries is the third season of the UCI ProSeries, the second tier road cycling tour, below the UCI World Tour, but above the various regional UCI Continental Circuits.

The original calendar consisted of 56 events, of which 30 are one-day races (1.Pro), and 26 are stage races (2.Pro). There are 47 events in Europe, six in Asia, two in the United States, and one in Argentina.

== Events ==
Races in the 2022 UCI ProSeries
Race	Date	Winner	Team	Ref.
(Argentina) Vuelta a San Juan	30 January – 2 February	Cancelled		
(Spain) Volta a la Comunitat Valenciana	2–6 February	Aleksandr Vlasov (RUS)	Bora–Hansgrohe	
(France) Tour de la Provence	10–13 February	Nairo Quintana (COL)	Arkéa–Samsic	
Tour of Oman	10–15 February	Jan Hirt (CZE)	Intermarché–Wanty–Gobert Matériaux	
(Spain) Clásica de Almería	13 February	Alexander Kristoff (NOR)	Intermarché–Wanty–Gobert Matériaux	
(Portugal) Volta ao Algarve	16–20 February	Remco Evenepoel (BEL)	Quick-Step Alpha Vinyl Team	
(Spain) Vuelta a Andalucía	16–20 February	Wout Poels (NED)	Team Bahrain Victorious	
(France) Faun-Ardèche Classic	26 February	Brandon McNulty (USA)	UAE Team Emirates	
(Belgium) Kuurne–Brussels–Kuurne	27 February	Fabio Jakobsen (NED)	Quick-Step Alpha Vinyl Team	
(France) La Drôme Classic	27 February	Jonas Vingegaard (DEN)	Team Jumbo–Visma	
(Italy) Trofeo Laigueglia	2 March	Jan Polanc (SLO)	UAE Team Emirates	
(Italy) Milano–Torino	16 March	Mark Cavendish (GBR)	Quick-Step Alpha Vinyl Team	
(Belgium) Nokere Koerse	16 March	Tim Merlier (BEL)	Alpecin–Fenix	
(France) Grand Prix de Denain	17 March	Max Walscheid (GER)	Cofidis	
(Belgium) Bredene Koksijde Classic	18 March	Pascal Ackermann (GER)	UAE Team Emirates	
(Italy) GP Industria & Artigianato	27 March	Diego Ulissi (ITA)	UAE Team Emirates	
(Spain) GP Miguel Induráin	2 April	Warren Barguil (FRA)	Arkéa–Samsic	
(Belgium) Scheldeprijs	6 April	Alexander Kristoff (NOR)	Intermarché–Wanty–Gobert Matériaux	
Presidential Tour of Turkey	10–17 April	Patrick Bevin (NZL)	Israel–Premier Tech	
(Belgium) Brabantse Pijl	13 April	Magnus Sheffield (USA)	INEOS Grenadiers	
(Italy) Tour of the Alps	18–22 April	Romain Bardet (FRA)	Team DSM	
(France) Four Days of Dunkirk	3–8 May	Philippe Gilbert (BEL)	Lotto–Soudal	
(France) Grand Prix du Morbihan	14 May	Julien Simon (FRA)	Team TotalEnergies	
(France) Tro-Bro Léon	15 May	Hugo Hofstetter (FRA)	Arkéa–Samsic	
Tour of Norway	24–29 May	Remco Evenepoel (BEL)	Quick-Step Alpha Vinyl Team	
(France) Boucles de la Mayenne	26–29 May	Benjamin Thomas (FRA)	Cofidis	
(Belgium) Brussels Cycling Classic	5 June	Taco van der Hoorn (NED)	Intermarché–Wanty–Gobert Matériaux	
(Netherlands) ZLM Tour	8–12 June	Olav Kooij (NED)	Team Jumbo–Visma	
(Belgium) Dwars door het Hageland	11 June	Oscar Riesebeek (NED)	Alpecin–Fenix	
Tour of Belgium	15–19 June	Mauro Schmid (SUI)	Quick-Step Alpha Vinyl Team	
Tour of Slovenia	15–19 June	Tadej Pogačar (SLO)	UAE Team Emirates	
(Belgium) Tour de Wallonie	23–27 July	Robert Stannard (AUS)	Alpecin–Deceuninck	
(United States) Tour of Utah	25–31 July	Cancelled		
(Spain) Vuelta a Burgos	2–6 August	Pavel Sivakov (FRA)	INEOS Grenadiers	
(Belgium) Circuit Franco–Belge	10 August	Alexander Kristoff (NOR)	Intermarché–Wanty–Gobert Matériaux	
Arctic Race of Norway	11–14 August	Andreas Leknessund (NOR)	Team DSM	
(Denmark) Danmark Rundt	16–20 August	Christophe Laporte (FRA)	Team Jumbo–Visma	
(Germany) Deutschland Tour	24–28 August	Adam Yates (GBR)	INEOS Grenadiers	
(United States) Maryland Cycling Classic	4 September	Sep Vanmarcke (BEL)	Israel–Premier Tech	
(United Kingdom) Tour of Britain	4–8 September (Note: The race was scheduled to run from 4 September to 11 September 2022. Following Operation London Bridge on 8 September 2022, the AJ Bell Tour of Britain was declared completed after five stages.)	Gonzalo Serrano (ESP)	Movistar Team	
(France) Grand Prix de Fourmies	11 September	Caleb Ewan (AUS)	Lotto–Soudal	
Tour de Luxembourg	13–17 September	Mattias Skjelmose Jensen (DEN)	Trek–Segafredo	
(Belgium) Grand Prix de Wallonie	14 September	Mathieu van der Poel (NED)	Alpecin–Deceuninck	
(Italy) Coppa Sabatini	15 September	Daniel Martínez (COL)	INEOS Grenadiers	
(Belgium) Primus Classic	17 September	Jordi Meeus (BEL)	Bora–Hansgrohe	
(Italy) Giro dell'Emilia	1 October	Enric Mas (ESP)	Movistar Team	
(Germany) Münsterland Giro	3 October	Olav Kooij (NED)	Team Jumbo–Visma	
(Italy) Coppa Bernocchi	3 October	Davide Ballerini (ITA)	Quick-Step Alpha Vinyl Team	
(Italy) Tre Valli Varesine	4 October	Tadej Pogačar (SLO)	UAE Team Emirates	
(Italy) Gran Piemonte	6 October	Iván García Cortina (ESP)	Movistar Team	
(China) Tour of Taihu Lake	8–11 October	Cancelled		
(France) Paris–Tours	9 October	Arnaud Démare (FRA)	Groupama–FDJ	
(Malaysia) Tour de Langkawi	11–18 October (Note: In late January, race organisers postponed the Tour de Langkawi, originally scheduled for 3–10 March, to 11–18 June, due to a recent surge in COVID-19 pandemic cases. Later the race was postponed again to October.)	Iván Sosa (COL)	Movistar Team	
Japan Cup	16 October	Neilson Powless (USA)	EF Education–EasyPost	
