= José Neves (cyclist) =

Portuguese cyclist (born 1995)

Personal information
- Full name: José Carlos Prates Neves Fernandes
- Born: 30 October 1995 (age 30) Santarém, Portugal
- Height: 1.75 m (5 ft 9 in)
- Weight: 61 kg (134 lb)

Cycling career
- Sport: Cycling
- Current team: Suspended
- Discipline: Road
- Role: Rider

Amateur teams
- 2014: CC José Maria Nicolau
- 2015: Anicolor
- 2016: Goldwin–José Maria Nicolau
- 2017: Liberty Seguros/Carglass
- 2018: EF Education First–Drapac p/b Cannondale (stagiaire)

Professional teams
- 2018: W52 / FC Porto
- 2019–2020: Burgos BH
- 2021–2022: W52 / FC Porto

Major wins
- One-day races and Classics National Road Race Championships (2021)

José Carlos Prates Neves Fernandes (born 30 October 1995) is a Portuguese cyclist, who last rode for UCI Continental team W52 / FC Porto.

On 4 October 2022, he received a three-year ban by the UCI for doping.

== Major results ==
2014
2nd Time trial, National Under-23 Road Championships
2015
1st Time trial, National Under-23 Road Championships
2017
1st Time trial, National Under-23 Road Championships
1st Overall Volta a Portugal do Futuro

1st Stage 2

5th Overall Troféu Joaquim Agostinho

1st Young rider classification

2018
1st Overall Troféu Joaquim Agostinho

1st Young rider classification

4th Time trial, National Road Championships
2019
2nd Overall Troféu Joaquim Agostinho

1st Young rider classification
1st Stage 3

2nd Overall Tour of China II
4th Time trial, National Road Championships
2021
National Road Championships

1st Road race
3rd Time trial

2nd Overall Volta ao Alentejo
2nd Overall Troféu Joaquim Agostinho

1st Stage 3

2022
3rd Overall Volta ao Alentejo
4th Time trial, National Road Championships

== See also ==
- Doping in sport
- List of doping cases in cycling
