= GP Internacional do Guadiana =

Portuguese multi-day road cycling race

Race details
- Date: March
- Region: Portugal
- Local name(s): Troféu Alpendre Internacional do Guadiana
- Discipline: Road race
- Competition: UCI Europe Tour
- Type: Stage race

History
- First edition: 2015
- Editions: 1 (as of 2015)

GP Internacional do Guadiana is a road bicycle race held annually in Portugal. It is organized as a 2.2 event on the UCI Europe Tour.

== Winners ==
Year	Country	Rider	Team
2015	Spain	Jordi Simón	Team Ecuador
