= Tavfer–Ovos Matinados–Mortágua =

Portuguese cycling team

Team information
- UCI code: MIR (2018–2020); TAV (2021–)
- Registered: Portugal
- Founded: 1999
- Discipline: Road
- Status: Continental (2018–)
- Bicycles: Scott
- Components: Miranda
- Website: Team home page

Key personnel
- General manager: Pedro Silva
- Team managers: Hélder Miranda; Xavier Silva

Team name history
- 1999–2001 2002 2003–2006 2007 2008 2009 2010–2011 2012 2013–2016 2017–2020 2021– 2022 2023–: Mortágua Clube duas Rodas; Labialfarma–Mortágua; Mortágua–Anicolor; ERA–Mortágua–SIPER; Mortágua–ERA–DR Seguros; Mortágua–DR Seguros; Mortágua–Basi; Mortágua; Anicolor; Miranda–Mortágua; Tavfer–Measindot–Mortágua; Tavfer–Mortágua–Ovos Matinados; Tavfer–Ovos Matinados–Mortágua
Jersey

Tavfer–Ovos Matinados–Mortágua (UCI team code: TAV) is a Portuguese men's cycling team focusing on junior development. The team was founded by former professional racing cyclist Pedro Silva.

== History ==
Velo Clube do Centro was established in 1999 as Mortágua Clube duas Rodas. Based in Mortágua, the club achieved several national championships in diverse categories.

For the 2018 season, Federação Portuguesa de Ciclismo allotted three new licenses for development teams, the team was promoted to UCI Continental status with sponsorship from Miranda e Irmão, a bicycle components company based in Águeda, and Mortágua municipality, supporters from the very beginning.

== Team roster ==
As of 16 February 2024.

Rider	Date of birth
Gonçalo Amado (POR)	9 February 1994 (age 32)
Rafael Barbas (POR)	27 June 2004 (age 22)
António Barbio (POR)	16 December 1993 (age 32)
Gonçalo Carvalho (POR)	3 December 1997 (age 28)
Leangel Linarez (VEN)	7 August 1997 (age 29)
César Martingil (POR)	10 January 1995 (age 31)

Rider	Date of birth
João Matias (POR)	26 May 1991 (age 35)
Francisco Morais (POR)	27 August 1998 (age 28)
Nicolás Sáenz (COL)	7 August 1997 (age 29)
Ángel Sánchez (ESP)	12 April 1993 (age 33)
Bruno Silva (POR)	17 May 1998 (age 28)
Andres Taboada (ESP)	12 December 2002 (age 23)

== Major wins ==
2003
Portugal Under-23 Road Race Championships, Hélio Costa
2004
Stage 1 Volta a Portugal do Futuro, Manuel Cardoso
2006
Volta a Portugal do Futuro

Stages 1 & 4, Bruno Sancho
Stage 5, Márcio Barbosa

2009
Portugal Under-23 Road Race Championships, Vasco Pereira
2010
Volta a Portugal do Futuro

Points classification, Pedro Paulinho
Prologue, Team time trial (Note: The riders on the squad were António Carvalho, João Caetano, Fábio Costa, Nuno Meireles, Pedro Paulinho, Guilherme Lourenço, Rui Carvalho and Renato Avelar)
Stage 2, António Carvalho
Stage 4, Pedro Paulinho

Stage 4 Volta à Madeira, Pedro Paulinho
2011
Volta a Portugal do Futuro

Stage 2, Pedro Paulinho
Points classification, António Carvalho

2014
Portugal Under-23 Road Race Championships, Joaquim Silva
Volta a Portugal do Futuro

Stage 2, Carlos Ribeiro
Team classification (Note: The riders on the squad were Rui Rodrigues, Gaspar Gonçalves, Carlos Ribeiro, Joaquim Silva, João Fernandes, Hugo Vaz, Xavier Silva and Rodrigo Gomes)
Points classification, Carlos Ribeiro

2015
Portugal Under-23 Time Trial Championships, José Fernandes
2017
Portugal Under-23 Road Race Championships, Francisco Campos
2018
Volta a Portugal do Futuro

Stages 3 & 4, Francisco Campos
Stage 5, Jorge Magalhaes

2021
Stages 2 & 3 Volta ao Alentejo, Iúri Leitão
2022
Stage 3 Volta ao Alentejo, Leangel Linarez
Stages 2 & 4 Volta a Portugal, João Matias

== National champions ==
2003
Portuguese Under-23 Road race, Hélio Costa
2009
Portuguese Under-23 Road race, Vasco Pereira
2014
Portuguese Under-23 Road race, Joaquim Silva
2015
Portuguese Under-23 time trial, José Fernandes
2017
Portuguese Under-23 Road race, Francisco Campos
