= Volta a Portugal do Futuro =

Annual road bicycle race in Portugal

Race details
- Date: July
- Region: Portugal
- Local name: Volta a Portugal do Futuro / Liberty Seguros
- Discipline: Road race
- Competition: UCI Europe Tour
- Type: Stage race
- Web site: futuro.volta-portugal.com

History
- First edition: 1993
- Editions: 32 (as of 2026)
- First winner: Joaquim Augusto Gomes (POR)
- Most wins: No repeat winners
- Most recent: Matvei Boldyrev

Volta a Portugal do Futuro is a road bicycle race held annually in Portugal. It is currently organized as a 2.2U event on the UCI Europe Tour.

== Winners ==
| Year | Winner | Second | Third |
|---|---|---|---|
| 1993 | (Portugal) Joaquim Augusto Gomes | (Portugal) Joaquim Adrego Andrade | (Portugal) Paulo Jorge Ferreira |
| 1994 | (Portugal) Paulo Jorge Ferreira | (Portugal) Delmino Pereira | (Portugal) Vítor Manuel Gamito |
| 1995 | (Portugal) Quintino Fernandes | | |
| 1996 | (Spain) José Luis Rebollo | | |
| 1997 | (Spain) Matías Cagigas | | |
| 1998 | (Portugal) José Bento Azevedo | | |
| 1999 | (Spain) Óscar Pereiro | (Spain) Rafael Casero | (Spain) David Blanco |
| 2000 | (Portugal) Pedro-Miguel Costa | (Spain) Santi Pérez | (Portugal) Pedro Manuel Andrade |
| 2001 | (Portugal) Marco Oliveira | (Portugal) Celio Cristiano | (Spain) José Guillén |
| 2002 | (Spain) Pablo de Pedro | (Portugal) Sergio Miguel Paulinho | (Spain) Víctor Castro |
| 2003 | (Spain) Dani Moreno | (Spain) Josu Mondelo | (Spain) David Domínguez |
| 2004 | (Portugal) João Paulo Cabreira | (Portugal) António Manuel De Jesus | (Portugal) Miguel Angelo Almeida |
| 2005 | (Portugal) André Fernando Santos | (Portugal) Afonso Duarte | (Portugal) José João Mendes |
| 2006 | (Portugal) Filipe Duarte | (Portugal) José João Mendes | (Portugal) Edgar Miguel Pinto |
| 2007 | (Portugal) José João Mendes | (Portugal) César André Fonte | (Portugal) David Vaz |
| 2008 | (Portugal) João Ricardo Benta | (Portugal) Carlos Manuel Sabido | (Portugal) Ricardo Augusto Vilela |
| 2009 | (Portugal) Marco Alexandre Cunha | (Portugal) Carlos Manuel Baltazar | (Portugal) Bruno Silva |
| 2010 | (Russia) Alexander Ryabkin | (Portugal) Joni Brandão | (Panama) Yelko Gómez |
| 2011 | (Portugal) Joni Brandão | (Portugal) José Isidro Maciel Gonçalves | (Portugal) Domingos André Maciel Gonçalves |
| 2012 | (Portugal) Rafael Jorge Silva | (Portugal) António André Pereira | (Moldova) Eugeniu Cozonac |
| 2013 | (Portugal) António Carvalho | (Portugal) David Miguel Rodrigues | (Portugal) António André Pereira |
| 2014 | (Portugal) Ruben Guerreiro | (Portugal) Joaquim Silva | (Spain) Óscar González |
| 2015 | (Spain) Julen Amezqueta | (Ukraine) Anatoliy Budyak | (Spain) Álvaro Trueba |
| 2016 | (Colombia) Wilson Enrique Rodríguez | (Portugal) Gaspar Gonçalves | (Spain) Juan Antonio López-Cózar |
| 2017 | (Portugal) José Fernandes | (Spain) Txomin Juaristi | (Portugal) Gaspar Gonçalves |
| 2018 | (Portugal) Venceslau Fernandes | (Portugal) Tiago Antunes | (Portugal) Hugo Nunes |
| 2019 | (Portugal) Emanuel Duarte | (Portugal) Pedro Lopes | (Portugal) Tiago Leal |
| 2021 | (Portugal) André Domingues | (Spain) Romaric Forqués | (Portugal) Pedro Lopes |
| 2022 | (Costa Rica) Gabriel Rojas | (Portugal) Hélder Gonçalves | (Spain) David Delgado |
| 2023 | (Portugal) João Silva | (Chile) Vicente Rojas | (Spain) Daniel Jiménez |
| 2024 | (Italy) Luca Bagnara | (Costa Rica) Dylan Jiménez | (Portugal) Alexandre Montez |
| 2025 | (Portugal) Lucas Lopes | (Portugal) Diogo Pinto | (Portugal) Tiago Santos |
| 2026 | Matvei Boldyrev | (Spain) Jaime Torres | (United States) Jesse Maris |
