= 2017 Troféu Joaquim Agostinho =

2017 UCI Europe Tour

Race details
- Dates: July 5–9, 2017
- Stages: 6
- Distance: 653.4 km (406.0 mi)
- Winning time: 16h 22' 17"

Results
Jersey awarded to the overall winner	Winner	Amaro Antunes (POR)	(W52 / FC Porto / Mestre da Cor)
	Second	Rinaldo Nocentini (ITA)	(Sporting / Tavira)
	Third	Frederico Figueiredo (POR)	(Sporting / Tavira)
Jersey awarded to the points classification winner	Points	Amaro Antunes (POR)	(W52 / FC Porto / Mestre da Cor)
Jersey awarded to the mountains classification winner	Mountains	Amaro Antunes (POR)	(W52 / FC Porto / Mestre da Cor)
Jersey awarded to the youth classification winner	Youth	José Fernandes (POR)	(Liberty Seguros–Carglass)
Jersey awarded to the combination classification winner	Combination	Amaro Antunes (POR)	(W52 / FC Porto / Mestre da Cor)
Jersey awarded to the sprints classification winner	Sprints	César Martingil (POR)	(Liberty Seguros–Carglass)
	Team	W52 / FC Porto / Mestre da Cor	

The 2017 Troféu Joaquim Agostinho–GP Internacional Torres Vedras was a road cycling stage race that took place in the Centro region of Portugal between 5 and 9 July 2017. The race was rated as a 2.2 event as part of the 2017 UCI Europe Tour, and was the 40th edition of the Troféu Joaquim Agostinho.

== Teams ==
The 16 teams invited to the race were:

UCI Professional Continental teams

- Caja Rural–Seguros RGA

UCI Continental teams

- Sporting / Tavira
- Rádio Popular–Boavista
- Louletano–Hospital de Loulé
- Efapel
- Burgos BH
- W52 / FC Porto / Mestre da Cor
- Euskadi Basque Country–Murias
- LA Alumínios / Metalusa Blackjack
- Armée de Terre
- Team Sparebanken Sør

Under 23 teams

- Miranda–Mortágua
- Liberty Seguros/Carglass
- Sicasal–Constantinos–Delta Cafés
- Jorbi–Team José Maria Nicolau
- Moreira Congelados–Feira–Bicicleta Andrade

== Stages ==
Stage characteristics and winners
Stage	Date	Course	Distance	Type	Winner
P	5 July	Turcifal	8 km (5 mi)	Individual time trial	Andreas Vangstad
1	6 July	São Mamede da Ventosa to Arruda dos Vinhos	140 km (87 mi)	Hilly stage	Yannis Yssaad
2	7 July	Sobral de Monte Agraço to Alto de Montejunto	154.8 km (96 mi)	Mountain stage	Amaro Antunes
3a	8 July	Atouguia da Baleia to Vimeiro	78 km (48 mi)	Flat stage	Yannis Yssaad
3a	8 July	Torres Vedras	111 km (69 mi)	Hilly stage	Daniel Mestre
4	9 July	São Martinho do Porto to Carvoeira (Parque Eólico)	161.6 km (100 mi)	Medium mountain stage	João Benta
	Total		653.4 km (406 mi)		

== Classification leadership ==
Classification leadership by stage
Stage	Winner	General classification	Points classification	Mountains classification	Sprints classification	Young rider classification	Combination classification	Team classification
P	Andreas Vangstad	Andreas Vangstad	no award	no award	no award	Óscar Rodríguez	no award	W52 / FC Porto / Mestre da Cor
1	Yannis Yssaad	Andreas Vangstad	Yannis Yssaad	Pablo Guerrero	David Ribeiro	Óscar Rodríguez	Pablo Guerrero	W52 / FC Porto / Mestre da Cor
2	Amaro Antunes	José Fernandes	Amaro Antunes	Amaro Antunes	César Martingil	José Fernandes	Amaro Antunes	W52 / FC Porto / Mestre da Cor
3a	Yannis Yssaad	José Fernandes	Yannis Yssaad	Amaro Antunes	César Martingil	José Fernandes	Amaro Antunes	W52 / FC Porto / Mestre da Cor
3b	Daniel Mestre	Amaro Antunes	Yannis Yssaad	Amaro Antunes	César Martingil	José Fernandes	Amaro Antunes	W52 / FC Porto / Mestre da Cor
4	João Benta	Amaro Antunes	Amaro Antunes	Amaro Antunes	César Martingil	José Fernandes	Amaro Antunes	W52 / FC Porto / Mestre da Cor
Final		Amaro Antunes	Amaro Antunes	Amaro Antunes	César Martingil	José Fernandes	Amaro Antunes	W52 / FC Porto / Mestre da Cor

- In stage two, Adrián González, who was second in the combination classification, wore the purple jersey, because first placed Pablo Guerrero wore the blue jersey as leader of the mountains classification.
- In the first sector of stage three, Frederico Figueiredo, who was second in the mountains classification, wore the blue jersey, because first placed Amaro Antunes wore the grey jersey as leader of the points classification.
- In the first sector of stage three, João Rodrigues, who was second in the young rider classification, wore the orange jersey, because first placed José Fernandes wore the yellow jersey as leader of the general classification.
- In the first sector of stage three, Rinaldo Nocentini, who was fourth in the combination classification, wore the purple jersey, because first placed Amaro Antunes wore the grey jersey as leader of the points classification, and second placed Frederico Figueiredo wore the blue jersey as leader of the mountains classification and third placed José Fernandes wore the yellow jersey as leader of the general classification.
- In the second sector of stage three, João Rodrigues, who was second in the young rider classification, wore the orange jersey, because first placed José Fernandes wore the yellow jersey as leader of the general classification.
- In the second sector of stage three, Frederico Figueiredo, who was second in the combination classification, wore the purple jersey, because first placed Amaro Antunes wore the blue jersey as leader of the mountains classification.
- In stage four, Vicente García de Mateos, who was third in the combination classification, wore the purple jersey, because first placed Amaro Antunes wore the yellow jersey as leader of the general classification and second placed Frederico Figueiredo wore the blue jersey as leader of the mountains classification.

== Final standings ==
Legend
General classification	Denotes the winner of the general classification	Points classification	Denotes the leader of the points classification
Mountains classification	Denotes the leader of the mountains classification	Young rider classification	Denotes the winner of the young rider classification
Sprints classification	Denotes the leader of the sprints classification	Combination classification	Denotes the leader of the combination classification

=== General classification ===
Final general classification (1–10)
Rank	Rider	Team	Time
1	Amaro Antunes (POR)	W52 / FC Porto / Mestre da Cor	16h 22' 17"
2	Rinaldo Nocentini (ITA)	Sporting / Tavira	+ 15"
3	Frederico Figueiredo (POR)	Sporting / Tavira	+ 18"
4	João Benta (POR)	Rádio Popular–Boavista	+ 40"
5	José Fernandes (POR)	Liberty Seguros/Carglass	+ 44"
6	Vicente García de Mateos (ESP)	Louletano–Hospital de Loulé	+ 52"
7	Sérgio Paulinho (POR)	Efapel	+ 54"
8	Pablo Torres (ESP)	Burgos BH	+ 1' 11"
9	Edgar Pinto (POR)	LA Alumínios / Metalusa Blackjack	+ 1' 18"
10	David de la Fuente (ESP)	Louletano–Hospital de Loulé	+ 1' 18"

=== Points classification ===
Final points classification (1–10)
Rank	Rider	Team	Points
1	Amaro Antunes (POR)	W52 / FC Porto / Mestre da Cor	61
2	Yannis Yssaad (FRA)	Armée de Terre	50
3	João Matias (POR)	LA Alumínios / Metalusa Blackjack	39
4	João Benta (POR)	Rádio Popular–Boavista	35
5	Frederico Figueiredo (POR)	Sporting / Tavira	33
6	Vicente García de Mateos (ESP)	Louletano–Hospital de Loulé	30
7	Rinaldo Nocentini (ITA)	Sporting / Tavira	28
8	Jimmy Raibaud (FRA)	Armée de Terre	26
9	Daniel Mestre (POR)	Efapel	25
10	Samuel Caldeira (POR)	W52 / FC Porto / Mestre da Cor	20

=== Mountains classification ===
Final mountains classification (1–10)
Rank	Rider	Team	Points
1	Amaro Antunes (POR)	W52 / FC Porto / Mestre da Cor	35
2	António Barbio (POR)	Efapel	30
3	Frederico Figueiredo (POR)	Sporting / Tavira	30
4	João Matias (POR)	LA Alumínios / Metalusa Blackjack	21
5	Rinaldo Nocentini (ITA)	Sporting / Tavira	21
6	Manuel Sola (ESP)	Caja Rural–Seguros RGA	20
7	Pablo Guerrero (ESP)	Rádio Popular–Boavista	18
8	José Fernandes (POR)	Liberty Seguros/Carglass	18
9	João Benta (POR)	Rádio Popular–Boavista	16
10	Raúl Alarcón (POR)	W52 / FC Porto / Mestre da Cor	16

=== Sprints classification ===
Final mountains classification (1–10)
Rank	Rider	Team	Points
1	César Martingil (POR)	Liberty Seguros/Carglass	23
2	João Matias (POR)	LA Alumínios / Metalusa Blackjack	13
3	Adrián González (ESP)	Euskadi Basque Country–Murias	7
4	Garikoitz Bravo (ESP)	Euskadi Basque Country–Murias	6
5	Ricardo Mestre (POR)	W52 / FC Porto / Mestre da Cor	5
6	António Barbio (POR)	Efapel	5
7	Igor Merino (ESP)	Burgos BH	4
8	Óscar Rodríguez (ESP)	Euskadi Basque Country–Murias	3
9	Samuel Caldeira (POR)	W52 / FC Porto / Mestre da Cor	3
10	Pablo Guerrero (ESP)	Rádio Popular–Boavista	3

=== Young rider classification ===
Final young rider classification (1–10)
Rank	Rider	Team	Time
1	José Fernandes (POR)	Liberty Seguros/Carglass	16h 23' 01"
2	Tiago Antunes (POR)	Sicasal–Constantinos–Delta Cafés	+ 1' 13"
3	João Rodrigues (POR)	W52 / FC Porto / Mestre da Cor	+ 2' 15"
4	Gaspar Gonçalves (POR)	Liberty Seguros/Carglass	+ 2' 37"
5	André Ramalho (POR)	Jorbi–Team José Maria Nicolau	+ 3' 12"
6	Gonçalo Carvalho (POR)	Miranda–Mortágua	+ 4' 28"
7	Hugo Nunes (POR)	Miranda–Mortágua	+ 11' 11"
8	Paulo Silva (POR)	Sicasal–Constantinos–Delta Cafés	+ 11' 34"
9	Trond Trondsen (NOR)	Team Sparebanken Sør	+ 13' 27"
10	Marcelo Salvador (POR)	Sicasal–Constantinos–Delta Cafés	+ 14' 17"

=== Combination classification ===
Final combination classification (1–10)
Rank	Rider	Team	Points
1	Amaro Antunes (POR)	W52 / FC Porto / Mestre da Cor	3
2	Frederico Figueiredo (POR)	Sporting / Tavira	11
3	Rinaldo Nocentini (ITA)	Sporting / Tavira	14
4	João Benta (POR)	Rádio Popular–Boavista	17
5	José Fernandes (POR)	Liberty Seguros/Carglass	24
6	Vicente García de Mateos (ESP)	Louletano–Hospital de Loulé	25
7	Manuel Sola (ESP)	Caja Rural–Seguros RGA	39
8	Pablo Torres (ESP)	Burgos BH	51
9	David de la Fuente (ESP)	Louletano–Hospital de Loulé	61
10	Rafael Silva (POR)	Efapel	61

=== Team classification ===
Final team classification (1–10)
Rank	Team	Time
1	W52 / FC Porto / Mestre da Cor	49h 10' 01"
2	Efapel	+ 26"
3	LA Alumínios / Metalusa Blackjack	+ 1' 49"
4	Rádio Popular–Boavista	+ 4' 23"
5	Liberty Seguros/Carglass	+ 7' 32"
6	Sporting / Tavira	+ 7' 55"
7	Louletano–Hospital de Loulé	+ 11' 44"
8	Sicasal–Constantinos–Delta Cafés	+ 14' 55"
9	Euskadi Basque Country–Murias	+ 22' 15"
10	Caja Rural–Seguros RGA	+ 25' 50"
