= 2017 Vuelta a Asturias =

2017 UCI Europe Tour

Race details
- Dates: 29 April – 1 May 2017
- Stages: 3
- Distance: 467.2 km (290.3 mi)
- Winning time: 12h 20' 42"

Results
Jersey awarded to the overall winner	Winner	~~Raúl Alarcón~~ Nairo Quintana (COL)	(Movistar Team)
	Second	Óscar Sevilla (ESP)	(Medellín–Inder)
	Third	João Benta (POR)	(Rádio Popular–Boavista)
Jersey awarded to the points classification winner	Points	~~Raúl Alarcón~~ Óscar Sevilla (ESP)	(Medellín–Inder)
Jersey awarded to the mountains classification winner	Mountains	Sergio Higuita (COL)	(Team Manzana Postobón)
	Young rider	Hernán Aguirre (COL)	(Team Manzana Postobón)
Jersey awarded to the sprints classification winner	Sprints	Fernando Grijalba (ESP)	(Kuwait–Cartucho.es)
	Team	W52 / FC Porto / Mestre da Cor	

The 2017 Vuelta a Asturias was the 60th edition of the Vuelta a Asturias cycling stage race, that took place over three stages from 29 April to 1 May 2017. It was held as part of the 2017 UCI Europe Tour. The defending champion was Hugh Carthy (Caja Rural–Seguros RGA), but Carthy did not defend his title as he had moved to the Cannondale–Drapac squad that was not invited to the race.

The race was won by Spanish rider Raúl Alarcón, riding for the Portuguese W52 / FC Porto / Mestre da Cor team. Over the stages, Alarcón won one and finished the other two in second place – more than enough for the points classification win – as he triumphed in the race overall by 32 seconds. Second place went to Colombia's Nairo Quintana (Movistar Team), in his final preparation race before the 2017 Giro d'Italia, while the podium was completed by Spain's Óscar Sevilla (Medellín–Inder) on countback from Portugal's João Benta of Rádio Popular–Boavista.

In the race's other classifications, Colombians Sergio Higuita and Hernán Aguirre from Team Manzana Postobón won the mountains and young rider classifications respectively, Kuwait–Cartucho.es rider Fernando Grijalba won the sprints classification, while W52 / FC Porto / Mestre da Cor won the teams classification, after placing Alarcón, Ricardo Mestre (seventh) and Joaquim Silva (ninth) in the top ten overall.

In March 2021 Raúl Alarcón due to doping had all his results obtained between July 28, 2015, and October 21, 2019, cancelled, including 2017 Vuelta a Asturias.

== Route ==
The race includes three road stages on consecutive days; the exact stage details were released on 20 April 2017.

Stage schedule
Stage	Date	Route	Distance	Type	Winner
1	29 April	Oviedo to Pola de Lena	169.2 km (105 mi)	Medium-mountain stage	Weimar Roldán (COL)
2	30 April	Ribera de Arriba to Alto del Acebo	177.1 km (110 mi)	Mountain stage	Nairo Quintana (COL)
3	1 May	Cangas del Narcea to Oviedo	120.9 km (75 mi)	Medium-mountain stage	~~Raúl Alarcón (ESP)~~
Total		467.2 km (290.3 mi)			

== Teams ==
A total of 20 teams raced in the 2017 Vuelta a Asturias.

UCI WorldTeams

- Movistar Team

UCI Professional Continental teams

- Caja Rural–Seguros RGA
- Team Manzana Postobón
- Israel Cycling Academy

UCI Continental teams

- Bicicletas Strongman
- Burgos BH
- D'Amico Utensilnord
- Euskadi Basque Country–Murias
- Inteja Dominican Cycling Team
- Kuwait–Cartucho.es
- LA Alumínios / Metalusa Blackjack
- Lokosphinx
- Louletano–Hospital de Loulé
- Medellín–Inder
- Rádio Popular–Boavista
- Team Sapura Cycling
- Sporting / Tavira
- Team UKYO
- W52 / FC Porto / Mestre da Cor

National teams

- Spain

== Stages ==
=== Stage 1 ===
29 April 2017 — Oviedo to Pola de Lena, 169.2 km (105 mi)

Result of Stage 1
Rank	Rider	Team	Time
1	Weimar Roldán (COL)	Medellín–Inder	4h 12' 50"
2	~~Raúl Alarcón~~ (ESP)	W52 / FC Porto / Mestre da Cor	+ 22"
3	Carlos Barbero (ESP)	Movistar Team	+ 27"
4	Benjamín Prades (ESP)	Team UKYO	+ 27"
5	Óscar Sevilla (ESP)	Medellín–Inder	+ 27"
6	Aldemar Reyes (COL)	Team Manzana Postobón	+ 27"
7	João Benta (POR)	Rádio Popular–Boavista	+ 27"
8	Garikoitz Bravo (ESP)	Euskadi Basque Country–Murias	+ 27"
9	Rinaldo Nocentini (ITA)	Sporting / Tavira	+ 27"
10	Ricardo Vilela (POR)	Team Manzana Postobón	+ 27"

General classification after Stage 1
Rank	Rider	Team	Time
1	Weimar Roldán (COL)	Medellín–Inder	4h 12' 40"
2	~~Raúl Alarcón~~ (ESP)	W52 / FC Porto / Mestre da Cor	+ 26"
3	Carlos Barbero (ESP)	Movistar Team	+ 33"
4	Benjamín Prades (ESP)	Team UKYO	+ 37"
5	Óscar Sevilla (ESP)	Medellín–Inder	+ 37"
6	Aldemar Reyes (COL)	Team Manzana Postobón	+ 37"
7	João Benta (POR)	Rádio Popular–Boavista	+ 37"
8	Garikoitz Bravo (ESP)	Euskadi Basque Country–Murias	+ 37"
9	Rinaldo Nocentini (ITA)	Sporting / Tavira	+ 37"
10	Ricardo Vilela (POR)	Team Manzana Postobón	+ 37"

=== Stage 2 ===
30 April 2017 — Ribera de Arriba to Alto del Acebo, 177.1 km (110 mi)

Result of Stage 2
Rank	Rider	Team	Time
1	Nairo Quintana (COL)	Movistar Team	5h 19' 40"
2	~~Raúl Alarcón~~ (ESP)	W52 / FC Porto / Mestre da Cor	+ 0"
3	Fernando Barceló (ESP)	Spain (national team)	+ 31"
4	Alejandro Marque (ESP)	Sporting / Tavira	+ 33"
5	Sergio Pardilla (ESP)	Caja Rural–Seguros RGA	+ 35"
6	João Benta (POR)	Rádio Popular–Boavista	+ 37"
7	Óscar Sevilla (ESP)	Medellín–Inder	+ 39"
8	Ricardo Mestre (POR)	W52 / FC Porto / Mestre da Cor	+ 43"
9	Joaquim Silva (POR)	W52 / FC Porto / Mestre da Cor	+ 49"
10	Dayer Quintana (COL)	Movistar Team	+ 53"

General classification after Stage 2
Rank	Rider	Team	Time
1	~~Raúl Alarcón~~ (ESP)	W52 / FC Porto / Mestre da Cor	9h 32' 40"
2	Nairo Quintana (COL)	Movistar Team	+ 7"
3	Alejandro Marque (ESP)	Sporting / Tavira	+ 50"
4	Sergio Pardilla (ESP)	Caja Rural–Seguros RGA	+ 52"
5	João Benta (POR)	Rádio Popular–Boavista	+ 54"
6	Óscar Sevilla (ESP)	Medellín–Inder	+ 56"
7	Ricardo Mestre (POR)	W52 / FC Porto / Mestre da Cor	+ 1' 00"
8	Ricardo Vilela (POR)	Team Manzana Postobón	+ 1' 20"
9	Joaquim Silva (POR)	W52 / FC Porto / Mestre da Cor	+ 1' 27"
10	Dayer Quintana (COL)	Movistar Team	+ 1' 34"

=== Stage 3 ===
1 May 2017 — Cangas del Narcea to Oviedo, 120.9 km (75 mi)

Result of Stage 3
Rank	Rider	Team	Time
1	~~Raúl Alarcón~~ (ESP)	W52 / FC Porto / Mestre da Cor	2h 48' 12"
2	Óscar Sevilla (ESP)	Medellín–Inder	+ 7"
3	João Benta (POR)	Rádio Popular–Boavista	+ 7"
4	Mikel Bizkarra (ESP)	Euskadi Basque Country–Murias	+ 10"
5	Nairo Quintana (COL)	Movistar Team	+ 15"
6	Benjamín Prades (ESP)	Team UKYO	+ 40"
7	José Herrada (ESP)	Movistar Team	+ 40"
8	Ricardo Mestre (POR)	W52 / FC Porto / Mestre da Cor	+ 40"
9	Alejandro Marque (ESP)	Sporting / Tavira	+ 40"
10	Mikel Iturria (ESP)	Euskadi Basque Country–Murias	+ 40"

Final general classification
Rank	Rider	Team	Time
	~~Raúl Alarcón~~ (ESP)	W52 / FC Porto / Mestre da Cor	12h 20' 42"
1	Nairo Quintana (COL)	Movistar Team	12h 21' 14"
2	Óscar Sevilla (ESP)	Medellín–Inder	+ 35"
3	João Benta (POR)	Rádio Popular–Boavista	+ 35"
4	Alejandro Marque (ESP)	Sporting / Tavira	+ 1' 08"
5	Sergio Pardilla (ESP)	Caja Rural–Seguros RGA	+ 1' 10"
6	Ricardo Mestre (POR)	W52 / FC Porto / Mestre da Cor	+ 1' 18"
7	Ricardo Vilela (POR)	Team Manzana Postobón	+ 1' 38"
8	Joaquim Silva (POR)	W52 / FC Porto / Mestre da Cor	+ 1' 45"
9	Hernán Aguirre (COL)	Team Manzana Postobón	+ 2' 14"
10	Garikoitz Bravo (ESP)	Euskadi Basque Country–Murias	+ 2' 23"

== Classification leadership table ==
In the 2017 Vuelta a Asturias, four jerseys were awarded. The general classification was calculated by adding each cyclist's finishing times on each stage. Time bonuses were awarded to the first three finishers on all stages: the stage winner won a ten-second bonus, with six and four seconds for the second and third riders respectively. Bonus seconds were also awarded to the first three riders at intermediate sprints – three seconds for the winner of the sprint, two seconds for the rider in second and one second for the rider in third. The leader of the general classification received a blue jersey. This classification was considered the most important of the 2017 Vuelta a Asturias, and the winner of the classification was considered the winner of the race.

Points for the mountains classification
Position	1	2	3	4	5	6
Points for Category 1	10	8	6	4	2	1
Points for Category 2	6	3	2	1	0	
Points for Category 3	3	2	1	0		

Additionally, there was a points classification, which awarded a green jersey. In the points classification, cyclists received points for finishing in the top 15 in a stage. For winning a stage, a rider earned 25 points, with 20 for second, 16 for third, 14 for fourth, 12 for fifth, 10 for sixth with a point fewer per place down to a single point for 15th place. There was also a sprints classification for the points awarded at intermediate sprints on each stage – awarded on a 3–2–1 scale – where the leadership of which was marked by a black-and-white jersey.

The fourth jersey represented the mountains classification, marked by a white jersey. Points for this classification were won by the first riders to the top of each categorised climb, with more points available for the higher-categorised climbs. There was also a classification for teams, in which the times of the best three cyclists per team on each stage were added together; the leading team at the end of the race was the team with the lowest total time.

Stage	Winner	General classification	Points classification	Mountains classification	Sprints classification	Young rider classification	Teams classification
1	Weimar Roldán	Weimar Roldán	Weimar Roldán	Domingos Gonçalves	Joaquim Silva	Aldemar Reyes	Medellín–Inder
2	Nairo Quintana	~~Raúl Alarcón~~	~~Raúl Alarcón~~	Sergio Higuita	Domingos Gonçalves	José Manuel Díaz	W52 / FC Porto / Mestre da Cor
3	~~Raúl Alarcón~~	~~Raúl Alarcón~~	~~Raúl Alarcón~~	Sergio Higuita	Fernando Grijalba	Hernán Aguirre	W52 / FC Porto / Mestre da Cor
Final		~~Raúl Alarcón~~ Nairo Quintana	~~Raúl Alarcón~~ Óscar Sevilla	Sergio Higuita	Fernando Grijalba	Hernán Aguirre	W52 / FC Porto / Mestre da Cor
