= 2019 Volta ao Algarve =

2019 UCI Europe Tour

Race details
- Dates: 20–24 February 2019
- Stages: 5
- Distance: 778.6 km (483.8 mi)
- Winning time: 19h 26' 34"

Results
Jersey awarded to the overall winner	Winner	Tadej Pogačar (SLO)	(UAE Team Emirates)
	Second	Søren Kragh Andersen (DEN)	(Team Sunweb)
	Third	Wout Poels (NED)	(Team Sky)
Jersey awarded to the points classification winner	Points	Pascal Ackermann (GER)	(Bora–Hansgrohe)
Jersey awarded to the mountains classification winner	Mountains	Tim Declercq (BEL)	(Deceuninck–Quick-Step)
Jersey awarded to the young rider classification winner	Young rider	Tadej Pogačar (SLO)	(UAE Team Emirates)
	Team	Team Sky	

The 2019 Volta ao Algarve was a road cycling stage race that took place in the Algarve region of Portugal between 20 and 24 February 2019. It was the 45th edition of the Volta ao Algarve and was rated as a 2.HC event as part of the UCI Europe Tour.

== Teams ==
Twenty-four teams started the race. Each team had a maximum of seven riders:

UCI WorldTeams

- Bora–Hansgrohe
- Deceuninck–Quick-Step
- Team Jumbo–Visma
- Team Katusha–Alpecin
- Team Sunweb
- UAE Team Emirates
- CCC Team
- Groupama–FDJ
- Team Dimension Data
- Trek–Segafredo
- Lotto–Soudal
- Team Sky

UCI Professional teams

- Caja Rural–Seguros RGA
- W52 / FC Porto
- Cofidis
- Wanty–Gobert

UCI Continental teams

- Ludofoods–Louletano
- LA Alumínios / LA Sport
- Rádio Popular–Boavista
- UD Oliveirense–InOutBuild
- Efapel
- Miranda–Mortágua
- Sporting / Tavira
- Vito–Feirense–PNB

== Route ==
Stage characteristics and winners
Stage	Date	Course	Distance	Type	Stage winner
1	20 February	Portimão to Lagos	199.1 km (123.7 mi)	Flat stage	Fabio Jakobsen (NED)
2	21 February	Almodôvar to Fóia	187.4 km (116.4 mi)	Mountain stage	Tadej Pogačar (SLO)
3	22 February	Lagoa to Lagoa	20.3 km (12.6 mi)	Individual time trial	Stefan Küng (SUI)
4	23 February	Albufeira to Tavira	198.3 km (123.2 mi)	Flat stage	Dylan Groenewegen (NED)
5	24 February	Faro to Alto do Malhão	173.5 km (107.8 mi)	Medium mountain stage	Zdeněk Štybar (CZE)

== Stages ==
=== Stage 1 ===
Stage 1 result

Rank	Rider	Team	Time
1	Fabio Jakobsen (NED)	Deceuninck–Quick-Step	4h 52' 59"
2	Arnaud Démare (FRA)	Groupama–FDJ	s.t.
3	Pascal Ackermann (GER)	Bora–Hansgrohe	s.t.
4	Simone Consonni (ITA)	UAE Team Emirates	s.t.
5	Jasper De Buyst (BEL)	Lotto–Soudal	s.t.
6	Søren Kragh Andersen (DEN)	Team Sunweb	s.t.
7	Edward Theuns (BEL)	Trek–Segafredo	s.t.
8	Jon Aberasturi (ESP)	Caja Rural–Seguros RGA	s.t.
9	Christophe Laporte (FRA)	Cofidis	s.t.
10	Neilson Powless (USA)	Team Jumbo–Visma	s.t.

General classification after Stage 1

Rank	Rider	Team	Time
1	Fabio Jakobsen (NED)	Deceuninck–Quick-Step	4h 52' 59"
2	Arnaud Démare (FRA)	Groupama–FDJ	s.t.
3	Pascal Ackermann (GER)	Bora–Hansgrohe	s.t.
4	Simone Consonni (ITA)	UAE Team Emirates	s.t.
5	Jasper De Buyst (BEL)	Lotto–Soudal	s.t.
6	Søren Kragh Andersen (DEN)	Team Sunweb	s.t.
7	Edward Theuns (BEL)	Trek–Segafredo	s.t.
8	Jon Aberasturi (ESP)	Caja Rural–Seguros RGA	s.t.
9	Christophe Laporte (FRA)	Cofidis	s.t.
10	Neilson Powless (USA)	Team Jumbo–Visma	s.t.

=== Stage 2 ===
Stage 2 result

Rank	Rider	Team	Time
1	Tadej Pogačar (SLO)	UAE Team Emirates	4h 58' 25"
2	Wout Poels (NED)	Team Sky	+ 1"
3	Enric Mas (ESP)	Deceuninck–Quick-Step	+ 3"
4	Sam Oomen (NED)	Team Sunweb	+ 5"
5	Amaro Antunes (POR)	CCC Team	+ 7"
6	David de la Cruz (ESP)	Team Sky	+ 21"
7	João Rodrigues (POR)	W52 / FC Porto	+ 24"
8	Simone Petilli (ITA)	UAE Team Emirates	+ 27"
9	José Herrada (ESP)	Cofidis	s.t.
10	Michael Valgren (DEN)	Team Dimension Data	+ 49"

General classification after Stage 2

Rank	Rider	Team	Time
1	Tadej Pogačar (SLO)	UAE Team Emirates	9h 51' 24"
2	Wout Poels (NED)	Team Sky	+ 1"
3	Enric Mas (ESP)	Deceuninck–Quick-Step	+ 3"
4	Sam Oomen (NED)	Team Sunweb	+ 5"
5	David de la Cruz (ESP)	Team Sky	+ 21"
6	Søren Kragh Andersen (DEN)	Team Sunweb	+ 51"
7	João Rodrigues (POR)	W52 / FC Porto	+ 1' 29"
8	Amaro Antunes (POR)	CCC Team	+ 1' 42"
9	Neilson Powless (USA)	Team Jumbo–Visma	+ 1' 46"
10	Marc Hirschi (SUI)	Team Sunweb	s.t.

=== Stage 3 ===
Stage 3 result

Rank	Rider	Team	Time
1	Stefan Küng (SUI)	Groupama–FDJ	24' 33"
2	Søren Kragh Andersen (DEN)	Team Sunweb	+ 2"
3	Yves Lampaert (BEL)	Deceuninck–Quick-Step	+ 5"
4	Ryan Mullen (IRL)	Trek–Segafredo	+ 8"
5	Tadej Pogačar (SLO)	UAE Team Emirates	+ 17"
6	Arnaud Démare (FRA)	Groupama–FDJ	+ 31"
7	Mads Pedersen (DEN)	Trek–Segafredo	+ 36"
8	Tao Geoghegan Hart (GBR)	Team Sky	s.t.
9	Nils Politt (GER)	Team Katusha–Alpecin	+ 42"
10	Zdeněk Štybar (CZE)	Deceuninck–Quick-Step	+ 43"

General classification after Stage 3

Rank	Rider	Team	Time
1	Tadej Pogačar (SLO)	UAE Team Emirates	10h 16' 14"
2	Enric Mas (ESP)	Deceuninck–Quick-Step	+ 31"
3	Søren Kragh Andersen (DEN)	Team Sunweb	+ 36"
4	Wout Poels (NED)	Team Sky	+ 37"
5	David de la Cruz (ESP)	Team Sky	+ 57"
6	Sam Oomen (NED)	Team Sunweb	+ 1' 08"
7	Zdeněk Štybar (CZE)	Deceuninck–Quick-Step	+ 2' 12"
8	Neilson Powless (USA)	Team Jumbo–Visma	+ 2' 13"
9	Marc Hirschi (SUI)	Team Sunweb	+ 2' 35"
10	Amaro Antunes (POR)	CCC Team	+ 2' 43"

=== Stage 4 ===
Stage 4 result

Rank	Rider	Team	Time
1	Dylan Groenewegen (NED)	Team Jumbo–Visma	4h 56' 07"
2	Arnaud Démare (FRA)	Groupama–FDJ	s.t.
3	Jasper Philipsen (BEL)	UAE Team Emirates	s.t.
4	Pascal Ackermann (GER)	Bora–Hansgrohe	s.t.
5	Simone Consonni (ITA)	UAE Team Emirates	s.t.
6	Jasper De Buyst (BEL)	Lotto–Soudal	s.t.
7	Timothy Dupont (BEL)	Wanty–Gobert	s.t.
8	Jens Debusschere (BEL)	Team Katusha–Alpecin	s.t.
9	Mike Teunissen (NED)	Team Jumbo–Visma	s.t.
10	Jon Aberasturi (ESP)	Caja Rural–Seguros RGA	s.t.

General classification after Stage 4

Rank	Rider	Team	Time
1	Tadej Pogačar (SLO)	UAE Team Emirates	15h 12' 28"
2	Søren Kragh Andersen (DEN)	Team Sunweb	+ 29"
3	Wout Poels (NED)	Team Sky	+ 30"
4	Enric Mas (ESP)	Deceuninck–Quick-Step	+ 31"
5	David de la Cruz (ESP)	Team Sky	+ 57"
6	Sam Oomen (NED)	Team Sunweb	+ 1' 28"
7	Zdeněk Štybar (CZE)	Deceuninck–Quick-Step	+ 2' 12"
8	Neilson Powless (USA)	Team Jumbo–Visma	+ 2' 13"
9	Marc Hirschi (SUI)	Team Sunweb	+ 2' 35"
10	Amaro Antunes (POR)	CCC Team	+ 2' 36"

=== Stage 5 ===
Stage 5 result

Rank	Rider	Team	Time
1	Zdeněk Štybar (CZE)	Deceuninck–Quick-Step	4h 13' 48"
2	Søren Kragh Andersen (DEN)	Team Sunweb	+ 3"
3	Wout Poels (NED)	Team Sky	+ 9"
4	Enric Mas (ESP)	Deceuninck–Quick-Step	+ 12"
5	Steve Cummings (GBR)	Team Dimension Data	+ 17"
6	Tadej Pogačar (SLO)	UAE Team Emirates	+ 18"
7	João Rodrigues (POR)	W52 / FC Porto	+ 24"
8	Sam Oomen (NED)	Team Sunweb	+ 30"
9	Tao Geoghegan Hart (GBR)	Team Sky	+ 31"
10	Amaro Antunes (POR)	CCC Team	+ 34"

== Final classifications ==
Final general classification

Rank	Rider	Team	Time
1	Tadej Pogačar (SLO)	UAE Team Emirates	19h 26' 34"
2	Søren Kragh Andersen (DEN)	Team Sunweb	+ 14"
3	Wout Poels (NED)	Team Sky	+ 21"
4	Enric Mas (ESP)	Deceuninck–Quick-Step	+ 25"
5	Sam Oomen (NED)	Team Sunweb	+ 1' 40"
6	Zdeněk Štybar (CZE)	Deceuninck–Quick-Step	+ 1' 54"
7	Neilson Powless (USA)	Team Jumbo–Visma	+ 2' 50"
8	Amaro Antunes (POR)	CCC Team	+ 2' 52"
9	João Rodrigues (POR)	W52 / FC Porto	+ 3' 27"
10	Simon Špilak (SLO)	Team Katusha–Alpecin	+ 3' 47"

Final points classification

Rank	Rider	Team	Points
1	Pascal Ackermann (GER)	Bora–Hansgrohe	29
2	Fabio Jakobsen (NED)	Deceuninck–Quick-Step	25
3	Dylan Groenewegen (NED)	Team Jumbo–Visma	25
4	Wout Poels (NED)	Team Sky	22
5	Jasper De Buyst (BEL)	Lotto–Soudal	21
6	Tadej Pogačar (SLO)	UAE Team Emirates	20
7	Søren Kragh Andersen (DEN)	Team Sunweb	20
8	Enric Mas (ESP)	Deceuninck–Quick-Step	18
9	Jasper Philipsen (BEL)	UAE Team Emirates	16
10	Zdeněk Štybar (CZE)	Deceuninck–Quick-Step	15

Final mountains classification

Rank	Rider	Team	Points
1	Tim Declercq (BEL)	Deceuninck–Quick-Step	15
2	Wout Poels (NED)	Team Sky	11
3	Tadej Pogačar (SLO)	UAE Team Emirates	10
4	Amaro Antunes (POR)	CCC Team	8
5	Vicente García de Mateos (ESP)	Ludofoods–Louletano	8
6	David Ribeiro (POR)	LA Alumínios / LA Sport	8
7	Enric Mas (ESP)	Deceuninck–Quick-Step	8
8	Zdeněk Štybar (CZE)	Deceuninck–Quick-Step	6
9	Stefan Küng (SUI)	Groupama–FDJ	6
10	Jonas Koch (GER)	CCC Team	6

Final young rider classification

Rank	Rider	Team	Time
1	Tadej Pogačar (SLO)	UAE Team Emirates	19h 26' 34"
2	Neilson Powless (USA)	Team Jumbo–Visma	+ 2' 50"
3	Marc Hirschi (SUI)	Team Sunweb	+ 10' 40"
4	Casper Pedersen (DEN)	Team Sunweb	+ 25' 01"
5	Hugo Nunes (POR)	Miranda–Mortágua	+ 25' 38"
6	Jasper Philipsen (BEL)	UAE Team Emirates	+ 26' 16"
7	Stan Dewulf (BEL)	Lotto–Soudal	+ 31' 11"
8	Emanuel Duarte (POR)	LA Alumínios / LA Sport	+ 33' 24"
9	João Barbosa (POR)	Vito–Feirense–PNB	+ 33' 29"
10	Rafael Lourenço (POR)	UD Oliveirense–InOutBuild	+ 34' 56"
