= 2017 Volta ao Algarve =

2017 UCI Europe Tour

Race details
- Dates: 15–19 February 2017
- Stages: 5
- Distance: 770.2 km (478.6 mi)
- Winning time: 19h 04' 03"

Results
Jersey awarded to the overall winner	Winner	Primož Roglič (Slovenia)	(LottoNL–Jumbo)
	Second	Michał Kwiatkowski (Poland)	(Team Sky)
	Third	Tony Gallopin (France)	(Lotto–Soudal)
Jersey awarded to the points classification winner	Points	André Greipel (Germany)	(Lotto–Soudal)
Jersey awarded to the mountains classification winner	Mountains	Juan Felipe Osorio (Colombia)	(Team Manzana Postobón)
Jersey awarded to the youth classification winner	Youth	Tiesj Benoot (Belgium)	(Lotto–Soudal)
	Team	Astana	

The 2017 Volta ao Algarve was a road cycling stage race that took place in the Algarve region of Portugal between 15 and 19 February 2017. It was the 43rd edition of the Volta ao Algarve and was rated as a 2.HC event as part of the 2017 UCI Europe Tour.

The race was won by Slovenian rider Primož Roglič for the LottoNL–Jumbo team, having taken the race lead after top-three finishes in the second and third stages. Roglič maintained a 22-second lead over Team Sky's Michał Kwiatkowski from Poland for the remainder of the race, to take the biggest stage race win of his career. The podium was completed by France's Tony Gallopin riding for the Lotto–Soudal team, a further 33 seconds in arrears of Kwiatkowski.

Two of Gallopin's teammates were to each win one of the race's sub-classifications; Tiesj Benoot won the young rider classification, finishing in eighth place overall while André Greipel won the points classification with a stage win and a second place during the race. Juan Felipe Osorio won the mountains classification for Team Manzana Postobón, while the teams classification was won by the Astana team.

== Teams ==
24 teams were invited to take part in the race. These included eleven UCI WorldTeams, six UCI Professional Continental teams, and seven UCI Continental teams.

UCI WorldTeams

- Astana
- Bora–Hansgrohe
- Cannondale–Drapac
- Team Dimension Data
- FDJ
- Team Katusha–Alpecin
- LottoNL–Jumbo
- Movistar Team
- Quick-Step Floors
- Team Sky
- Trek–Segafredo

UCI Professional Continental teams

- Caja Rural–Seguros RGA
- Cofidis
- Gazprom–RusVelo
- Team Manzana Postobón
- Roompot–Nederlandse Loterij
- Wanty–Groupe Gobert

UCI Continental teams

- Efapel
- LA Alumínios / Metalusa Blackjack
- Louletano–Hospital de Loulé
- Rádio Popular–Boavista
- Rally Cycling
- Sporting / Tavira
- W52 / FC Porto / Mestre da Cor

== Route ==
The route for the race was announced on 8 December 2016.

Stage schedule
Stage	Date	Route	Distance	Type	Winner
1	15 February	Albufeira to Lagos	182.9 km (114 mi)	Flat stage	Fernando Gaviria (COL)
2	16 February	Lagoa to Fóia	189.3 km (118 mi)	Medium-mountain stage	Dan Martin (IRL)
3	17 February	Sagres to Sagres	18 km (11 mi)	Individual time trial	Jonathan Castroviejo (ESP)
4	18 February	Almodôvar to Tavira	203.4 km (126 mi)	Flat stage	André Greipel (GER)
5	19 February	Loulé to Alto do Malhão	179.2 km (111 mi)	Medium-mountain stage	Amaro Antunes (POR)

== Stages ==
=== Stage 1 ===
15 February 2017 — Albufeira to Lagos, 182.9 km (114 mi)

Result of Stage 1
Rank	Rider	Team	Time
1	Fernando Gaviria (COL)	Quick-Step Floors	4h 28' 31"
2	André Greipel (GER)	Lotto–Soudal	+ 0"
3	Nacer Bouhanni (FRA)	Cofidis	+ 0"
4	Dylan Groenewegen (NED)	LottoNL–Jumbo	+ 0"
5	John Degenkolb (GER)	Trek–Segafredo	+ 0"
6	Baptiste Planckaert (BEL)	Team Katusha–Alpecin	+ 0"
7	Matteo Trentin (ITA)	Quick-Step Floors	+ 0"
8	Andrea Pasqualon (ITA)	Wanty–Groupe Gobert	+ 0"
9	Łukasz Wiśniowski (POL)	Team Sky	+ 0"
10	Edvald Boasson Hagen (NOR)	Team Dimension Data	+ 0"

General classification after Stage 1
Rank	Rider	Team	Time
1	Fernando Gaviria (COL)	Quick-Step Floors	4h 28' 21"
2	Christoph Pfingsten (GER)	Bora–Hansgrohe	+ 1"
3	André Greipel (GER)	Lotto–Soudal	+ 4"
4	Justin Oien (USA)	Caja Rural–Seguros RGA	+ 4"
5	Nacer Bouhanni (FRA)	Cofidis	+ 6"
6	João Benta (POR)	Rádio Popular–Boavista	+ 8"
7	Dylan Groenewegen (NED)	LottoNL–Jumbo	+ 10"
8	John Degenkolb (GER)	Trek–Segafredo	+ 10"
9	Baptiste Planckaert (BEL)	Team Katusha–Alpecin	+ 10"
10	Matteo Trentin (ITA)	Quick-Step Floors	+ 10"

=== Stage 2 ===
16 February 2017 — Lagoa to Fóia, 189.3 km (118 mi)

Result of Stage 2
Rank	Rider	Team	Time
1	Dan Martin (IRL)	Quick-Step Floors	4h 46' 35"
2	Primož Roglič (SLO)	LottoNL–Jumbo	+ 0"
3	Michał Kwiatkowski (POL)	Team Sky	+ 20"
4	Amaro Antunes (POR)	W52 / FC Porto / Mestre da Cor	+ 33"
5	Rinaldo Nocentini (ITA)	Sporting / Tavira	+ 33"
6	Luis León Sánchez (ESP)	Astana	+ 35"
7	Jonathan Castroviejo (ESP)	Movistar Team	+ 35"
8	Tony Gallopin (FRA)	Lotto–Soudal	+ 35"
9	Edgar Pinto (POR)	LA Alumínios / Metalusa Blackjack	+ 35"
10	Tiesj Benoot (BEL)	Lotto–Soudal	+ 46"

General classification after Stage 2
Rank	Rider	Team	Time
1	Dan Martin (IRL)	Quick-Step Floors	9h 14' 56"
2	Primož Roglič (SLO)	LottoNL–Jumbo	+ 4"
3	Michał Kwiatkowski (POL)	Team Sky	+ 26"
4	Amaro Antunes (POR)	W52 / FC Porto / Mestre da Cor	+ 43"
5	Tony Gallopin (FRA)	Lotto–Soudal	+ 43"
6	Rinaldo Nocentini (ITA)	Sporting / Tavira	+ 43"
7	Luis León Sánchez (ESP)	Astana	+ 45"
8	Edgar Pinto (POR)	LA Alumínios / Metalusa Blackjack	+ 45"
9	Jonathan Castroviejo (ESP)	Movistar Team	+ 45"
10	Tiesj Benoot (BEL)	Lotto–Soudal	+ 56"

=== Stage 3 ===
17 February 2017 — Sagres to Sagres, 18 km (11 mi), individual time trial (ITT)

Result of Stage 3
Rank	Rider	Team	Time
1	Jonathan Castroviejo (ESP)	Movistar Team	21' 24"
2	Tony Martin (GER)	Team Katusha–Alpecin	+ 4"
3	Primož Roglič (SLO)	LottoNL–Jumbo	+ 5"
4	Michał Kwiatkowski (POL)	Team Sky	+ 5"
5	Lars Boom (NED)	LottoNL–Jumbo	+ 11"
6	Arnaud Démare (FRA)	FDJ	+ 12"
7	Alex Dowsett (GBR)	Movistar Team	+ 16"
8	Edvald Boasson Hagen (NOR)	Team Dimension Data	+ 20"
9	Nelson Oliveira (POR)	Movistar Team	+ 20"
10	Tony Gallopin (FRA)	Lotto–Soudal	+ 21"

General classification after Stage 3
Rank	Rider	Team	Time
1	Primož Roglič (SLO)	LottoNL–Jumbo	9h 36' 29"
2	Michał Kwiatkowski (POL)	Team Sky	+ 22"
3	Jonathan Castroviejo (ESP)	Movistar Team	+ 36"
4	Tony Gallopin (FRA)	Lotto–Soudal	+ 55"
5	Luis León Sánchez (ESP)	Astana	+ 59"
6	Dan Martin (IRL)	Quick-Step Floors	+ 1' 31"
7	Tony Martin (GER)	Team Katusha–Alpecin	+ 1' 40"
8	Tiesj Benoot (BEL)	Lotto–Soudal	+ 1' 49"
9	Amaro Antunes (POR)	W52 / FC Porto / Mestre da Cor	+ 1' 54"
10	Rinaldo Nocentini (ITA)	Sporting / Tavira	+ 1' 56"

=== Stage 4 ===
18 February 2017 — Almodôvar to Tavira, 203.4 km (126 mi)

Result of Stage 4
Rank	Rider	Team	Time
1	André Greipel (GER)	Lotto–Soudal	4h 57' 51"
2	John Degenkolb (GER)	Trek–Segafredo	+ 0"
3	Dylan Groenewegen (NED)	LottoNL–Jumbo	+ 0"
4	Arnaud Démare (FRA)	FDJ	+ 0"
5	Jasper Stuyven (BEL)	Trek–Segafredo	+ 0"
6	Andrea Pasqualon (ITA)	Wanty–Groupe Gobert	+ 0"
7	Fernando Gaviria (COL)	Quick-Step Floors	+ 0"
8	Nacer Bouhanni (FRA)	Cofidis	+ 0"
9	Michael Schwarzmann (GER)	Bora–Hansgrohe	+ 0"
10	Edvald Boasson Hagen (NOR)	Team Dimension Data	+ 0"

General classification after Stage 4
Rank	Rider	Team	Time
1	Primož Roglič (SLO)	LottoNL–Jumbo	14h 34' 20"
2	Michał Kwiatkowski (POL)	Team Sky	+ 22"
3	Jonathan Castroviejo (ESP)	Movistar Team	+ 36"
4	Tony Gallopin (FRA)	Lotto–Soudal	+ 55"
5	Luis León Sánchez (ESP)	Astana	+ 59"
6	Dan Martin (IRL)	Quick-Step Floors	+ 1' 31"
7	Tony Martin (GER)	Team Katusha–Alpecin	+ 1' 40"
8	Tiesj Benoot (BEL)	Lotto–Soudal	+ 1' 49"
9	Amaro Antunes (POR)	W52 / FC Porto / Mestre da Cor	+ 1' 54"
10	Rinaldo Nocentini (ITA)	Sporting / Tavira	+ 1' 56"

=== Stage 5 ===
19 February 2017 — Loulé to Alto do Malhão, 179.2 km (111 mi)

Result of Stage 5
Rank	Rider	Team	Time
1	Amaro Antunes (POR)	W52 / FC Porto / Mestre da Cor	4h 29' 28"
2	Vicente García de Mateos (ESP)	Louletano–Hospital de Loulé	+ 12"
3	Tiesj Benoot (BEL)	Lotto–Soudal	+ 12"
4	Michał Kwiatkowski (POL)	Team Sky	+ 15"
5	Primož Roglič (SLO)	LottoNL–Jumbo	+ 15"
6	Rinaldo Nocentini (ITA)	Sporting / Tavira	+ 15"
7	Jaime Rosón (ESP)	Caja Rural–Seguros RGA	+ 15"
8	Luis León Sánchez (ESP)	Astana	+ 15"
9	Tony Gallopin (FRA)	Lotto–Soudal	+ 15"
10	David de la Fuente (ESP)	Louletano–Hospital de Loulé	+ 15"

Final general classification
Rank	Rider	Team	Time
1	Primož Roglič (SLO)	LottoNL–Jumbo	19h 04' 03"
2	Michał Kwiatkowski (POL)	Team Sky	+ 22"
3	Tony Gallopin (FRA)	Lotto–Soudal	+ 55"
4	Luis León Sánchez (ESP)	Astana	+ 59"
5	Amaro Antunes (POR)	W52 / FC Porto / Mestre da Cor	+ 1' 29"
6	Dan Martin (IRL)	Quick-Step Floors	+ 1' 36"
7	Jonathan Castroviejo (ESP)	Movistar Team	+ 1' 40"
8	Tiesj Benoot (BEL)	Lotto–Soudal	+ 1' 42"
9	Rinaldo Nocentini (ITA)	Sporting / Tavira	+ 1' 56"
10	Edgar Pinto (POR)	LA Alumínios / Metalusa Blackjack	+ 2' 19"

== Classification leadership table ==
In the 2017 Volta ao Algarve, four different jerseys were awarded. For the general classification, calculated by adding each cyclist's finishing times on each stage, and allowing time bonuses for the first three finishers at intermediate sprints and at the finish of mass-start stages, the leader received a yellow jersey. This classification was considered the most important of the 2017 Volta ao Algarve, and the winner of the classification was considered the winner of the race.

Additionally, there was a points classification, which awarded a red jersey. In the points classification, cyclists received points for finishing in the top 10 in a mass-start stage. For winning a stage, a rider earned 25 points, with 20 for second, 16 for third, 13 for fourth, 10 for fifth, 8 for sixth, 6 for seventh, 4 for eighth, 2 for ninth and 1 for tenth place. Points towards the classification could also be accrued at intermediate sprint points during each stage; these intermediate sprints also offered bonus seconds towards the general classification. There was also a mountains classification, the leadership of which was marked by a blue jersey. In the mountains classification, points were won by reaching the top of a climb before other cyclists, with more points available for the higher-categorised climbs.

The fourth jersey represented the young rider classification, marked by a white jersey. This was decided in the same way as the general classification, but only riders born after 1 January 1994 were eligible to be ranked in the classification. There was also a classification for teams, in which the times of the best three cyclists per team on each stage were added together; the leading team at the end of the race was the team with the lowest total time.

Stage	Winner	General classification	Mountains classification	Young rider classification	Points classification	Teams classification
1	Fernando Gaviria	Fernando Gaviria	Adam de Vos	Fernando Gaviria	Fernando Gaviria	Quick-Step Floors
2	Dan Martin	Dan Martin	Dan Martin	Tiesj Benoot	Dan Martin	Astana
3	Jonathan Castroviejo	Primož Roglič	Dan Martin	Tiesj Benoot	Dan Martin	Movistar Team
4	André Greipel	Primož Roglič	Dan Martin	Tiesj Benoot	André Greipel	Movistar Team
5	Amaro Antunes	Primož Roglič	Juan Felipe Osorio	Tiesj Benoot	André Greipel	Astana
Final		Primož Roglič	Juan Felipe Osorio	Tiesj Benoot	André Greipel	Astana
