= 2018 Volta a Portugal =

Race details
- Dates: August 1–12, 2018
- Stages: 11
- Distance: 1,589.1 km (987.4 mi)
- Winning time: 41h 15' 32"

Results
| Jersey awarded to the overall winner | Winner | ~~Raúl Alarcón~~ (ESP) | (W52 / FC Porto) |
| | Second | Joni Brandão (POR) | (Sporting / Tavira) |
| | Third | Vicente García de Mateos (ESP) | (Aviludo–Louletano) |
| Jersey awarded to the points classification winner | Points | Vicente García de Mateos (ESP) | (Aviludo–Louletano) |
| Jersey awarded to the mountains classification winner | Mountains | ~~Raúl Alarcón~~ (ESP) | (W52 / FC Porto) |
| Jersey awarded to the youth classification winner | Youth | Xuban Errazkin (ESP) | (Vito–Feirense–BlackJack) |
| | Combination | ~~Raúl Alarcón~~ (ESP) | (W52 / FC Porto) |
| | Team | Sporting / Tavira | |

The 2018 Volta a Portugal was the 80th edition of the Volta a Portugal cycle race and was held on 1 August to 12 August 2018. The race started in Setúbal and finished in Fafe. Raúl Alarcón end the race in first place. However, in March 2021, due to doping all his results obtained between 28 July 2015 and 21 October 2019 were cancelled, including 2018 Volta a Portugal.

== Teams ==
The 18 teams participating in the race are:

UCI Professional Continental teams

- WB Aqua Protect Veranclassic
- Israel Cycling Academy
- Euskadi–Murias
- Caja Rural–Seguros RGA

UCI Continental teams

- Team Ecuador
- W52 / FC Porto
- Team Coop
- Sporting / Tavira
- Differdange–Losch
- Amore & Vita–Prodir
- Aviludo–Louletano
- Vito–Feirense–BlackJack
- Efapel
- Rádio Popular–Boavista
- MsTina–Focus
- Miranda–Mortágua
- Liberty Seguros–Carglass
- LA Alumínios

== Stages ==
Stage 4 and queen stage, originally 171,4 km, was shortened 27 km due to extreme weather conditions. The passage through Torre was replaced by Penhas Douradas climb, also the Seia intermediate sprint was eliminated.

Stage characteristics and winners
| Stage | Date | Course | Distance | Type | Winner |
|---|---|---|---|---|---|
| P | 1 August | Setúbal | 1.8 km (1 mi) | Individual time trial | Rafael Reis (POR) |
| 1 | 2 August | Alcácer do Sal to Albufeira | 191.8 km (119 mi) | Flat stage | Riccardo Stacchiotti (ITA) |
| 2 | 3 August | Beja to Portalegre | 203.6 km (127 mi) | Hilly stage | Vicente García de Mateos (ESP) |
| 3 | 4 August | Sertã to Oliveira do Hospital | 177.8 km (110 mi) | Medium mountain stage | ~~Raúl Alarcón~~ (ESP) |
| 4 | 5 August | Guarda to Covilhã | 144 km (89 mi) | Mountain stage | ~~Raúl Alarcón~~ (ESP) |
| 5 | 6 August | Sabugal to Viseu | 191.7 km (119 mi) | Medium mountain stage | Riccardo Stacchiotti (ITA) |
| | 7 August | Municipality of Viseu | | Rest day | |
| 6 | 8 August | Sernancelhe to Boticas | 165.4 km (103 mi) | Medium mountain stage | Domingos Gonçalves (POR) |
| 7 | 9 August | Montalegre to Viana do Castelo (Santa Luzia) | 165.5 km (103 mi) | Hilly stage | Enrique Sanz (ESP) |
| 8 | 10 August | Barcelos to Braga | 147.6 km (92 mi) | Medium mountain stage | Vicente García de Mateos (ESP) |
| 9 | 11 August | Felgueiras to Alto da Senhora da Graça | 155.2 km (96 mi) | Mountain stage | ~~Raúl Alarcón~~ (ESP) |
| 10 | 12 August | Fafe | 17.3 km (11 mi) | Individual time trial | Vicente García de Mateos (ESP) |
| | Total | | 1,561.7 km (970 mi) | | |

== Classification leadership ==
There were four main individual classifications being contested in the 2018 Volta a Portugal, as well a team, combination and national rider competition. The most important was the general classification, which was calculated by adding each rider's finishing times on each stage. The rider with the lowest cumulative time was the winner of the general classification and was considered to be the overall winner of the Tour. The rider leading the classification wore a yellow jersey sponsored by Santander.

Second, there is a points classification, which awards a green jersey sponsored by Rubis Gás. In the points classification, cyclists receive points for finishing inside the top 10 in a stage apart from the prologue, and unlike in the points classification in the Tour de France, the winners of all stages (with the exception of the prologue) are awarded the same number of points. For winning a stage, a rider earns 25 points, with 20 for second, 16 for third, 13 for fourth, 10 for fifth, 8 for sixth, 6 for seventh, 4 for eight, 2 for ninth and a single point for 10th place. In addition, riders receive points for finishing in the top three at intermediate sprints during each stage – awarded on a 3–2–1 scale.

Points for the mountains classification
| Position | 1 | 2 | 3 | 4 | 5 | 6 | 7 | 8 | 9 | 10 | 11 | 12 | 13 |
|---|---|---|---|---|---|---|---|---|---|---|---|---|---|
| Points for Category S | 25 | 20 | 17 | 15 | 13 | 11 | 9 | 7 | 5 | 4 | 3 | 2 | 1 |
| Points for 1st category | 15 | 13 | 11 | 9 | 7 | 5 | 4 | 3 | 2 | 1 | 0 | | |
| Points for 2nd category | 10 | 8 | 6 | 4 | 2 | 1 | 0 | | | | | | |
| Points for 3rd category | 5 | 3 | 2 | 1 | 0 | | | | | | | | |
| Points for 4th category | 3 | 2 | 1 | 0 | | | | | | | | | |

There is also a mountains classification, the leadership of which is marked by a blue jersey sponsored by Liberty Seguros. In the mountains classification, points towards the classification are won by reaching the top of a climb before other cyclists. Each climb is categorised as either category S, 1st, 2nd, 3rd or 4th, with more points available for the higher-categorised climbs.

The fourth jersey represents the young rider classification, marked by a white jersey sponsored by RTP. This is decided the same way as the general classification, but only riders born on or after 1 January 1995 are eligible to be ranked in the classification.

There were also awards for the team classification, sponsored by EDP, in which the times of the best three cyclists per team on each stage are added together; the leading team at the end of the race is the team with the lowest total time. The number of stage victories and placings per team determined the outcome of a tie. The riders in the team that led this classification were identified with yellow number bibs on the back of their jerseys.

The next individual award was the combination (Kombinado) classification. A rider's ranking in the combination classification was determined by tallying up his positions in the general, points and mountains classifications. If no rider was classified in all three classifications, riders classified in two would have been considered, and if that was tied the general classification will decide the winner. This classification was sponsored by Kia.

The seven and final award represents the classification for Portuguese riders and was sponsored by Jogos Santa Casa. This is decided the same way as the general classification, but only riders born in Portugal are eligible to be ranked in the classification. Like the combination award this is only presented on the podium and is not worn in race.

A total of €128,790 was awarded in cash prizes in the race. The overall winner of the general classification received €16,045, with the second and third placed riders getting €8,115 and €3,985 respectively. All finishers in the top 20 were awarded with money. The final winners of the points, mountains, young rider, combination and best Portuguese rider classifications were given €1,500. The team classification winners were awarded a trophy. €3,060 was given to the winners of each stage of the race, apart from the prologue where the winner was given €1,490, with smaller amounts given to places 2–20.

Classification leadership by stage
| Stage | Winner | General classification | Points classification | Mountains classification | Young rider classification | Team classification | Combination classification | Portuguese rider classification |
|---|---|---|---|---|---|---|---|---|
| P | Rafael Reis | Rafael Reis | no award | no award | César Martingil | Sporting / Tavira | no award | Rafael Reis |
| 1 | Riccardo Stacchiotti | Rafael Reis | Riccardo Stacchiotti | Mario Vogt | César Martingil | Sporting / Tavira | Mario Vogt | Rafael Reis |
| 2 | Vicente García de Mateos | Rafael Reis | Luís Mendonça | Mario Vogt | César Martingil | Sporting / Tavira | Mario Vogt | Rafael Reis |
| 3 | ~~Raúl Alarcón~~ | ~~Raúl Alarcón~~ | Vicente García de Mateos | Mario Vogt | Óscar Rodríguez | W52 / FC Porto | Vicente García de Mateos | Joni Brandão |
| 4 | ~~Raúl Alarcón~~ | ~~Raúl Alarcón~~ | Vicente García de Mateos | ~~Raúl Alarcón~~ | Xuban Errazkin | Sporting / Tavira | ~~Raúl Alarcón~~ | Joni Brandão |
| 5 | Riccardo Stacchiotti | ~~Raúl Alarcón~~ | Vicente García de Mateos | ~~Raúl Alarcón~~ | Xuban Errazkin | Sporting / Tavira | ~~Raúl Alarcón~~ | Joni Brandão |
| 6 | Domingos Gonçalves | ~~Raúl Alarcón~~ | Vicente García de Mateos | ~~Raúl Alarcón~~ | Xuban Errazkin | Sporting / Tavira | ~~Raúl Alarcón~~ | Joni Brandão |
| 7 | Enrique Sanz | ~~Raúl Alarcón~~ | Vicente García de Mateos | ~~Raúl Alarcón~~ | Xuban Errazkin | Sporting / Tavira | ~~Raúl Alarcón~~ | Joni Brandão |
| 8 | Vicente García de Mateos | ~~Raúl Alarcón~~ | Vicente García de Mateos | Joni Brandão | Xuban Errazkin | Sporting / Tavira | ~~Raúl Alarcón~~ | Joni Brandão |
| 9 | ~~Raúl Alarcón~~ | ~~Raúl Alarcón~~ | Vicente García de Mateos | ~~Raúl Alarcón~~ | Xuban Errazkin | Sporting / Tavira | ~~Raúl Alarcón~~ | Joni Brandão |
| 10 | Vicente García de Mateos | ~~Raúl Alarcón~~ | Vicente García de Mateos | ~~Raúl Alarcón~~ | Xuban Errazkin | W52 / FC Porto | ~~Raúl Alarcón~~ | Joni Brandão |
| Final | | ~~Raúl Alarcón~~ | Vicente García de Mateos | ~~Raúl Alarcón~~ | Xuban Errazkin | W52 / FC Porto | ~~Raúl Alarcón~~ | Joni Brandão |
