= 2017 Volta a Portugal =

2017 UCI Europe Tour

Race details
- Dates: August 4 - 15
- Stages: 10 + Prologue
- Distance: 1,626.7 km (1,010.8 mi)
- Winning time: 41h 46' 14"

Results
Jersey awarded to the overall winner	Winner	~~Raúl Alarcón~~ (ESP)	(W52 / FC Porto / Mestre da Cor)
	Second	Amaro Antunes (POR)	(W52 / FC Porto / Mestre da Cor)
	Third	Vicente de Mateos (ESP)	(Louletano–Hospital de Loulé)
Jersey awarded to the points classification winner	Points	Vicente de Mateos (ESP)	(Louletano–Hospital de Loulé)
Jersey awarded to the mountains classification winner	Mountains	Amaro Antunes (POR)	(W52 / FC Porto / Mestre da Cor)
Jersey awarded to the young rider classification winner	Young rider	Krists Neilands (LAT)	(Israel Cycling Academy)
	Team	W52 / FC Porto / Mestre da Cor	

The 2017 Volta a Portugal was a men's road bicycle race held from 4 August to 15 August 2017. It is the 79th edition of the men's stage race to be held, which was established in 1927. As part of the 2017 UCI Europe Tour, it was rated as a 2.1 event. Raúl Alarcón end the race in first place. However, in March 2021, due to doping all his results obtained between 28 July 2015 and 21 October 2019 were cancelled, including 2017 Volta a Portugal.

== Participating teams ==
In total, 18 teams are set to compete.

- National teams:
  - W52 / FC Porto / Mestre da Cor
  - Efapel
  - Rádio Popular–Boavista
  - LA Alumínios / Metalusa Blackjack
  - Sporting / Tavira
  - Louletano–Hospital de Loulé
- International teams:
  - JLT–Condor
  - Israel Cycling Academy
  - Unieuro Trevigiani–Hemus 1896
  - H&R Block Pro Cycling
  - Metec–TKH
  - GM Europa Ovini
  - Team Vorarlberg
  - Euskadi Basque Country–Murias
  - Dauner D&DQ–Akkon
  - Kuwait–Cartucho.es
  - Bike Aid
  - Armée de Terre

== Schedule ==
Stage	Route	Distance	Date	Type	Winner
P	Lisbon > Lisbon	5.4 km (3 mi)	August 4	Individual time trial	Damien Gaudin (FRA)
1	Vila Franca de Xira > Setúbal	203 km (126 mi)	August 5	Medium-mountain stage	~~Raúl Alarcón (ESP)~~
2	Reguengos de Monsaraz > Castelo Branco	214.7 km (133 mi)	August 6	Medium-mountain stage	Samuel Caldeira (POR)
3	Figueira de Castelo Rodrigo > Bragança	162.7 km (101 mi)	August 7	Medium-mountain stage	Bryan Alaphilippe (FRA)
4	Macedo de Cavaleiros > Mondim de Basto (Srª da Graça)	152.7 km (95 mi)	August 8	Mountain stage	~~Raúl Alarcón (ESP)~~
5	Boticas > Viana do Castelo	179.6 km (112 mi)	August 9	Medium-mountain stage	Gustavo Veloso (ESP)
6	Braga > Fafe	182.7 km (114 mi)	August 10	Mountain stage	Rui Sousa (POR)
7	Lousada > Santo Tirso (Santuário N. Sra. Assunção)	161.9 km (101 mi)	August 12	Medium-mountain stage	António Barbio (POR)
8	Gondomar > Oliveira de Azeméis	159.8 km (99 mi)	August 13	Medium-mountain stage	Vicente de Mateos (ESP)
9	Lousã > Guarda	184.1 km (114 mi)	August 14	Mountain stage	Amaro Antunes (POR)
10	Viseu > Viseu	20.1 km (12 mi)	August 15	Individual time trial	Gustavo Veloso (ESP)

== Classification leadership ==
Stage	Winner	General classification Classificação Geral Individual	Points classification Classificação dos Pontos	Mountains classification Classificação da Montanha	Young rider classification Classificação da Juventude	Team classification Classificação por Equipas
P	Damien Gaudin	Damien Gaudin	not awarded	not awarded	Travis Samuel	Sporting / Tavira
1	~~Raúl Alarcón~~	~~Raúl Alarcón~~	~~Raúl Alarcón~~	César Fonte	Óscar Rodríguez	W52 / FC Porto / Mestre da Cor
2	Samuel Caldeira	~~Raúl Alarcón~~	~~Raúl Alarcón~~	Roy Goldstein	Óscar Rodríguez	W52 / FC Porto / Mestre da Cor
3	Bryan Alaphilippe	~~Raúl Alarcón~~	~~Raúl Alarcón~~	João Matias	Óscar Rodríguez	W52 / FC Porto / Mestre da Cor
4	~~Raúl Alarcón~~	~~Raúl Alarcón~~	~~Raúl Alarcón~~	João Matias	Krists Neilands	W52 / FC Porto / Mestre da Cor
5	Gustavo Veloso	~~Raúl Alarcón~~	~~Raúl Alarcón~~	João Matias	Krists Neilands	W52 / FC Porto / Mestre da Cor
6	Rui Sousa	~~Raúl Alarcón~~	Vicente de Mateos	João Matias	Krists Neilands	W52 / FC Porto / Mestre da Cor
7	António Barbio	~~Raúl Alarcón~~	Vicente de Mateos	João Matias	Krists Neilands	W52 / FC Porto / Mestre da Cor
8	Vicente de Mateos	~~Raúl Alarcón~~	Vicente de Mateos	João Matias	Krists Neilands	W52 / FC Porto / Mestre da Cor
9	Amaro Antunes	~~Raúl Alarcón~~	Vicente de Mateos	Amaro Antunes	Krists Neilands	W52 / FC Porto / Mestre da Cor
10	Gustavo Veloso	~~Raúl Alarcón~~	Vicente de Mateos	Amaro Antunes	Krists Neilands	W52 / FC Porto / Mestre da Cor
Final Classification		~~Raúl Alarcón~~	Vicente de Mateos	Amaro Antunes	Krists Neilands	W52 / FC Porto / Mestre da Cor

== Classification standings ==
=== Prologue ===
4 August 2017 — Lisbon, 5.4 km individual time trial (ITT)

Prologue result and general classification

Rank	Rider	Team	Time
1	Damien Gaudin (FRA)	Armée de Terre	6' 24"
2	Domingos Gonçalves (POR)	Rádio Popular–Boavista	+ 2"
3	Alejandro Marque (ESP)	Sporting / Tavira	+ 3"
4	James Gullen (GBR)	JLT–Condor	+ 4"
5	Travis Samuel (CAN)	H&R Block Pro Cycling	+ 9"
6	Jesús Ezquerra (ESP)	Sporting / Tavira	+ 11"
7	Théry Schir (SUI)	Team Vorarlberg	+ 11"
8	Stefan Schumacher (GER)	Kuwait–Cartucho.es	+ 11"
9	Gian Friesecke (SUI)	Team Vorarlberg	+ 12"
10	Oscar Rodríguez (ESP)	Euskadi Basque Country–Murias	+ 13"

=== Stage 1 ===
5 August 2017 — Vila Franca de Xira to Setubal, 203 km

Stage 1 result

Rank	Rider	Team	Time
1	~~Raúl Alarcón (ESP)~~	W52 / FC Porto / Mestre da Cor	4h 55' 57"
2	Amaro Antunes (POR)	W52 / FC Porto / Mestre da Cor	+ 11"
3	David de la Fuente (ESP)	Louletano–Hospital de Loulé	+ 11"
4	Vicente de Mateos (ESP)	Louletano–Hospital de Loulé	+ 11"
5	Rinaldo Nocentini (ITA)	Sporting / Tavira	+ 11"
6	César Fonte (POR)	LA Alumínios / Metalusa Blackjack	+ 11"
7	Davide Rebellin (ITA)	Kuwait–Cartucho.es	+ 11"
8	Gustavo Veloso (ESP)	W52 / FC Porto / Mestre da Cor	+ 11"
9	Alejandro Marque (ESP)	Sporting / Tavira	+ 11"
10	Sérgio Paulinho (POR)	Efapel	+ 11"

General classification after Stage 1

Rank	Rider	Team	Time
1	~~Raúl Alarcón (ESP)~~	W52 / FC Porto / Mestre da Cor	5h 02' 29"
2	Alejandro Marque (ESP)	Sporting / Tavira	+ 6"
3	Domingos Gonçalves (POR)	Rádio Popular–Boavista	+ 15"
4	Rinaldo Nocentini (ITA)	Sporting / Tavira	+ 16"
5	Gustavo Veloso (ESP)	W52 / FC Porto / Mestre da Cor	+ 17"
6	Sérgio Paulinho (POR)	Efapel	+ 20"
7	Amaro Antunes (POR)	W52 / FC Porto / Mestre da Cor	+ 22"
8	Rui Sousa (POR)	Rádio Popular–Boavista	+ 25"
9	Vicente de Mateos (ESP)	Louletano–Hospital de Loulé	+ 29"
10	Davide Rebellin (ITA)	Kuwait–Cartucho.es	+ 32"

=== Stage 2 ===
6 August 2017 — Reguengos de Monsaraz to Castelo Branco, 214.7 km

Stage 2 result

Rank	Rider	Team	Time
1	Samuel Caldeira (POR)	W52 / FC Porto / Mestre da Cor	5h 38' 16"
2	Antonino Parrinello (ITA)	GM Europa Ovini	s.t.
3	Stéphane Poulhies (FRA)	Armée de Terre	s.t.
4	Jason Lowndes (AUS)	Israel Cycling Academy	s.t.
5	Fabian Lienhard (SUI)	Team Vorarlberg	s.t.
6	César Fonte (POR)	LA Alumínios / Metalusa Blackjack	s.t.
7	~~Raúl Alarcón (ESP)~~	W52 / FC Porto / Mestre da Cor	s.t.
8	Domingos Gonçalves (POR)	Rádio Popular–Boavista	s.t.
9	Matteo Rotondi (ITA)	GM Europa Ovini	s.t.
10	Amaro Antunes (POR)	W52 / FC Porto / Mestre da Cor	s.t.

General classification after Stage 2

Rank	Rider	Team	Time
1	~~Raúl Alarcón (ESP)~~	W52 / FC Porto / Mestre da Cor	10h 40' 45"
2	Alejandro Marque (ESP)	Sporting / Tavira	+ 6"
3	Domingos Gonçalves (POR)	Rádio Popular–Boavista	+ 15"
4	Rinaldo Nocentini (ITA)	Sporting / Tavira	+ 16"
5	Gustavo Veloso (ESP)	W52 / FC Porto / Mestre da Cor	+ 17"
6	Sérgio Paulinho (POR)	Efapel	+ 20"
7	Amaro Antunes (POR)	W52 / FC Porto / Mestre da Cor	+ 22"
8	Rui Sousa (POR)	Rádio Popular–Boavista	+ 25"
9	Vicente de Mateos (ESP)	Louletano–Hospital de Loulé	+ 29"
10	Davide Rebellin (ITA)	Kuwait–Cartucho.es	+ 32"

=== Stage 3 ===
7 August 2017 — Figueira de Castelo Rodrigo to Bragança, 162.7 km

Stage 3 result

Rank	Rider	Team	Time
1	Bryan Alaphilippe (FRA)	Armée de Terre	4h 06' 08"
2	Krists Neilands (LAT)	Israel Cycling Academy	s.t.
3	Daniel Mestre (POR)	Efapel	s.t.
4	Vicente de Mateos (ESP)	Louletano–Hospital de Loulé	s.t.
5	Marco Tizza (ITA)	GM Europa Ovini	s.t.
6	Amaro Antunes (POR)	W52 / FC Porto / Mestre da Cor	s.t.
7	Fabian Lienhard (SUI)	Team Vorarlberg	s.t.
8	Samuel Caldeira (POR)	W52 / FC Porto / Mestre da Cor	s.t.
9	~~Raúl Alarcón (ESP)~~	W52 / FC Porto / Mestre da Cor	s.t.
10	Jarno Gmelich (NED)	Metec–TKH	s.t.

General classification after Stage 3

Rank	Rider	Team	Time
1	~~Raúl Alarcón (ESP)~~	W52 / FC Porto / Mestre da Cor	14h 46' 53"
2	Alejandro Marque (ESP)	Sporting / Tavira	+ 6"
3	Domingos Gonçalves (POR)	Rádio Popular–Boavista	+ 12"
4	Rinaldo Nocentini (ITA)	Sporting / Tavira	+ 16"
5	Gustavo Veloso (ESP)	W52 / FC Porto / Mestre da Cor	+ 17"
6	Sérgio Paulinho (POR)	Efapel	+ 20"
7	Amaro Antunes (POR)	W52 / FC Porto / Mestre da Cor	+ 22"
8	Rui Sousa (POR)	Rádio Popular–Boavista	+ 25"
9	Vicente de Mateos (ESP)	Louletano–Hospital de Loulé	+ 29"
10	Davide Rebellin (ITA)	Kuwait–Cartucho.es	+ 32"

=== Stage 4 ===
8 August 2017 — Macedo de Cavaleiros to Mondim de Basto (Srª da Graça), 152.7 km

Stage 4 result

Rank	Rider	Team	Time
1	~~Raúl Alarcón (ESP)~~	W52 / FC Porto / Mestre da Cor	4h 02' 52"
2	Amaro Antunes (POR)	W52 / FC Porto / Mestre da Cor	+ 3"
3	Rinaldo Nocentini (ITA)	Sporting / Tavira	+ 3"
4	João Benta (POR)	Rádio Popular–Boavista	+ 4"
5	Vicente de Mateos (ESP)	Louletano–Hospital de Loulé	+ 4"
6	Gustavo Veloso (ESP)	W52 / FC Porto / Mestre da Cor	+ 19"
7	Alejandro Marque (ESP)	Sporting / Tavira	+ 19"
8	António Carvalho (POR)	W52 / FC Porto / Mestre da Cor	+ 25"
9	Henrique Casimiro (POR)	Efapel	+ 25"
10	Mikel Bizkarra (ESP)	Euskadi Basque Country–Murias	+ 42"

General classification after Stage 4

Rank	Rider	Team	Time
1	~~Raúl Alarcón (ESP)~~	W52 / FC Porto / Mestre da Cor	18h 49' 35"
2	Rinaldo Nocentini (ITA)	Sporting / Tavira	+ 25"
3	Amaro Antunes (POR)	W52 / FC Porto / Mestre da Cor	+ 29"
4	Alejandro Marque (ESP)	Sporting / Tavira	+ 35"
5	Vicente de Mateos (ESP)	Louletano–Hospital de Loulé	+ 43"
6	Gustavo Veloso (ESP)	W52 / FC Porto / Mestre da Cor	+ 46"
7	João Benta (POR)	Rádio Popular–Boavista	+ 1' 25"
8	Henrique Casimiro (POR)	Efapel	+ 1' 30"
9	António Carvalho (POR)	W52 / FC Porto / Mestre da Cor	+ 1' 34"
10	Sérgio Paulinho (POR)	Efapel	+ 1' 38"

=== Stage 5 ===
9 August 2017 — Boticas to Viana do Castelo, 179.6 km

Stage 5 result

Rank	Rider	Team	Time
1	Gustavo Veloso (ESP)	W52 / FC Porto / Mestre da Cor	4h 37' 56"
2	Vicente de Mateos (ESP)	Louletano–Hospital de Loulé	s.t.
3	Daniel Mestre (POR)	Efapel	s.t.
4	Krists Neilands (LAT)	Israel Cycling Academy	s.t.
5	César Fonte (POR)	LA Alumínios / Metalusa Blackjack	s.t.
6	Rinaldo Nocentini (ITA)	Sporting / Tavira	s.t.
7	João Benta (POR)	Rádio Popular–Boavista	s.t.
8	Alejandro Marque (ESP)	Sporting / Tavira	s.t.
9	~~Raúl Alarcón (ESP)~~	W52 / FC Porto / Mestre da Cor	s.t.
10	Davide Rebellin (ITA)	Kuwait–Cartucho.es	s.t.

General classification after Stage 5

Rank	Rider	Team	Time
1	~~Raúl Alarcón (ESP)~~	W52 / FC Porto / Mestre da Cor	23h 27' 31"
2	Rinaldo Nocentini (ITA)	Sporting / Tavira	+ 25"
3	Amaro Antunes (POR)	W52 / FC Porto / Mestre da Cor	+ 29"
4	Alejandro Marque (ESP)	Sporting / Tavira	+ 35"
5	Gustavo Veloso (ESP)	W52 / FC Porto / Mestre da Cor	+ 36"
6	Vicente de Mateos (ESP)	Louletano–Hospital de Loulé	+ 37"
7	João Benta (POR)	Rádio Popular–Boavista	+ 1' 25"
8	Henrique Casimiro (POR)	Efapel	+ 1' 37"
9	António Carvalho (POR)	W52 / FC Porto / Mestre da Cor	+ 1' 38"
10	Sérgio Paulinho (POR)	Efapel	+ 1' 45"

=== Stage 6 ===
10 August 2017 — Braga to Fafe, 182.7 km

Stage 6 result

Rank	Rider	Team	Time
1	Rui Sousa (POR)	Rádio Popular–Boavista	4h 41' 50"
2	Vicente de Mateos (ESP)	Louletano–Hospital de Loulé	+ 4"
3	Rinaldo Nocentini (ITA)	Sporting / Tavira	+ 4"
4	Gustavo Veloso (ESP)	W52 / FC Porto / Mestre da Cor	+ 4"
5	~~Raúl Alarcón (ESP)~~	W52 / FC Porto / Mestre da Cor	+ 4"
6	João Benta (POR)	Rádio Popular–Boavista	+ 4"
7	Henrique Casimiro (POR)	Efapel	+ 4"
8	Amaro Antunes (POR)	W52 / FC Porto / Mestre da Cor	+ 4"
9	Sérgio Paulinho (POR)	Efapel	+ 4"
10	António Carvalho (POR)	W52 / FC Porto / Mestre da Cor	+ 4"

General classification after Stage 6

Rank	Rider	Team	Time
1	~~Raúl Alarcón (ESP)~~	W52 / FC Porto / Mestre da Cor	28h 09' 22"
2	Rinaldo Nocentini (ITA)	Sporting / Tavira	+ 24"
3	Amaro Antunes (POR)	W52 / FC Porto / Mestre da Cor	+ 30"
4	Vicente de Mateos (ESP)	Louletano–Hospital de Loulé	+ 34"
5	Gustavo Veloso (ESP)	W52 / FC Porto / Mestre da Cor	+ 39"
6	João Benta (POR)	Rádio Popular–Boavista	+ 1' 28"
7	António Carvalho (POR)	W52 / FC Porto / Mestre da Cor	+ 1' 35"
8	Henrique Casimiro (POR)	Efapel	+ 1' 40"
9	Sérgio Paulinho (POR)	Efapel	+ 1' 48"
10	Alejandro Marque (ESP)	Sporting / Tavira	+ 1' 56"

=== Stage 7 ===
12 August 2017 — Lousada to Santo Tirso (Santuário N. Sra. Assunção), 161.9 km

Stage 7 result

Rank	Rider	Team	Time
1	António Barbio (POR)	Efapel	4h 06' 01"
2	Gustavo Veloso (ESP)	W52 / FC Porto / Mestre da Cor	+ 1' 07"
3	Vicente de Mateos (ESP)	Louletano–Hospital de Loulé	+ 1' 07"
4	Rinaldo Nocentini (ITA)	Sporting / Tavira	+ 1' 07"
5	~~Raúl Alarcón (ESP)~~	W52 / FC Porto / Mestre da Cor	+ 1' 07"
6	João Benta (POR)	Rádio Popular–Boavista	+ 1' 11"
7	Amaro Antunes (POR)	W52 / FC Porto / Mestre da Cor	+ 1' 11"
8	Marco Tizza (ITA)	GM Europa Ovini	+ 1' 15"
9	Davide Rebellin (ITA)	Kuwait–Cartucho.es	+ 1' 15"
10	Krists Neilands (LAT)	Israel Cycling Academy	+ 1' 15"

General classification after Stage 7

Rank	Rider	Team	Time
1	~~Raúl Alarcón (ESP)~~	W52 / FC Porto / Mestre da Cor	32h 16' 30"
2	Rinaldo Nocentini (ITA)	Sporting / Tavira	+ 24"
3	Vicente de Mateos (ESP)	Louletano–Hospital de Loulé	+ 30"
4	Gustavo Veloso (ESP)	W52 / FC Porto / Mestre da Cor	+ 33"
5	Amaro Antunes (POR)	W52 / FC Porto / Mestre da Cor	+ 34"
6	João Benta (POR)	Rádio Popular–Boavista	+ 1' 32"
7	António Carvalho (POR)	W52 / FC Porto / Mestre da Cor	+ 1' 50"
8	Henrique Casimiro (POR)	Efapel	+ 2' 00"
9	Sérgio Paulinho (POR)	Efapel	+ 2' 00"
10	Alejandro Marque (ESP)	Sporting / Tavira	+ 2' 08"

=== Stage 8 ===
13 August 2017 — Gondomar to Oliveira de Azeméis, 159.8 km

Stage 8 result

Rank	Rider	Team	Time
1	Vicente de Mateos (ESP)	Louletano–Hospital de Loulé	4h 06' 39"
2	Daniel Mestre (POR)	Efapel	s.t.
3	Marco Tizza (ITA)	GM Europa Ovini	s.t.
4	Gustavo Veloso (ESP)	W52 / FC Porto / Mestre da Cor	s.t.
5	Rinaldo Nocentini (ITA)	Sporting / Tavira	s.t.
6	Krists Neilands (LAT)	Israel Cycling Academy	s.t.
7	Fabien Lienhard (SUI)	Team Vorarlberg	+ 4"
8	~~Raúl Alarcón (ESP)~~	W52 / FC Porto / Mestre da Cor	+ 4"
9	César Fonte (POR)	LA Alumínios / Metalusa Blackjack	+ 4"
10	Alejandro Marque (ESP)	Sporting / Tavira	+ 4"

General classification after Stage 8

Rank	Rider	Team	Time
1	~~Raúl Alarcón (ESP)~~	W52 / FC Porto / Mestre da Cor	36h 23' 13"
2	Vicente de Mateos (ESP)	Louletano–Hospital de Loulé	+ 14"
3	Rinaldo Nocentini (ITA)	Sporting / Tavira	+ 19"
4	Gustavo Veloso (ESP)	W52 / FC Porto / Mestre da Cor	+ 26"
5	Amaro Antunes (POR)	W52 / FC Porto / Mestre da Cor	+ 34"
6	João Benta (POR)	Rádio Popular–Boavista	+ 1' 35"
7	António Carvalho (POR)	W52 / FC Porto / Mestre da Cor	+ 1' 58"
8	Henrique Casimiro (POR)	Efapel	+ 2' 08"
9	Sérgio Paulinho (POR)	Efapel	+ 2' 08"
10	Alejandro Marque (ESP)	Sporting / Tavira	+ 2' 08"

=== Stage 9 ===
14 August 2017 — Lousã to Guarda, 184.1 km

Stage 9 result

Rank	Rider	Team	Time
1	Amaro Antunes (POR)	W52 / FC Porto / Mestre da Cor	4h 56' 55"
2	~~Raúl Alarcón (ESP)~~	W52 / FC Porto / Mestre da Cor	s.t.
3	Krists Neilands (LAT)	Israel Cycling Academy	+ 1' 28"
4	Vicente de Mateos (ESP)	Louletano–Hospital de Loulé	+ 4' 41"
5	Rinaldo Nocentini (ITA)	Sporting / Tavira	+ 4' 44"
6	João Benta (POR)	Rádio Popular–Boavista	+ 4' 48"
7	Alejandro Marque (ESP)	Sporting / Tavira	+ 4' 50"
8	Henrique Casimiro (POR)	W52 / FC Porto / Mestre da Cor	+ 4' 50"
9	Hugo Sancho (POR)	LA Alumínios / Metalusa Blackjack	+ 4' 57"
10	David Rodrigues (POR)	Rádio Popular–Boavista	+ 5' 07"

General classification after Stage 9

Rank	Rider	Team	Time
1	~~Raúl Alarcón (ESP)~~	W52 / FC Porto / Mestre da Cor	41h 19' 59"
2	Amaro Antunes (POR)	W52 / FC Porto / Mestre da Cor	+ 31"
3	Vicente de Mateos (ESP)	Louletano–Hospital de Loulé	+ 5' 04"
4	Rinaldo Nocentini (ITA)	Sporting / Tavira	+ 5' 12"
5	João Benta (POR)	Rádio Popular–Boavista	+ 6' 32"
6	Henrique Casimiro (POR)	Efapel	+ 7' 07"
7	Alejandro Marque (ESP)	Sporting / Tavira	+ 7' 07"
8	António Carvalho (POR)	W52 / FC Porto / Mestre da Cor	+ 7' 16"
9	Sérgio Paulinho (POR)	Efapel	+ 7' 39"
10	Krists Neilands (LAT)	Israel Cycling Academy	+ 8' 31"

=== Stage 10 ===
15 August 2017 — Viseu to Viseu, 20.1 km

Stage 9 result

Rank	Rider	Team	Time
1	Gustavo Veloso (ESP)	W52 / FC Porto / Mestre da Cor	26' 00"
2	~~Raúl Alarcón (ESP)~~	W52 / FC Porto / Mestre da Cor	+ 15"
3	Alejandro Marque (ESP)	Sporting / Tavira	+ 18"
4	António Carvalho (POR)	W52 / FC Porto / Mestre da Cor	+ 24"
5	Vicente de Mateos (ESP)	Louletano–Hospital de Loulé	+ 36"
6	Ricardo Mestre (POR)	W52 / FC Porto / Mestre da Cor	+ 41"
7	Damien Gaudin (FRA)	Armée de Terre	+ 44"
8	Théry Schir (SUI)	Team Vorarlberg	+ 53"
9	Rinaldo Nocentini (ITA)	Sporting / Tavira	+ 57"
10	Amaro Antunes (POR)	W52 / FC Porto / Mestre da Cor	+ 1' 07"

Final General Classification

Rank	Rider	Team	Time
1	~~Raúl Alarcón (ESP)~~	W52 / FC Porto / Mestre da Cor	41h 46' 14"
2	Amaro Antunes (POR)	W52 / FC Porto / Mestre da Cor	+ 1' 23"
3	Vicente de Mateos (ESP)	Louletano–Hospital de Loulé	+ 5' 25"
4	Rinaldo Nocentini (ITA)	Sporting / Tavira	+ 5' 54"
5	Alejandro Marque (ESP)	Sporting / Tavira	+ 7' 10"
6	António Carvalho (POR)	W52 / FC Porto / Mestre da Cor	+ 7' 25"
7	João Benta (POR)	Rádio Popular–Boavista	+ 7' 54"
8	Henrique Casimiro (POR)	Efapel	+ 8' 11"
9	Sérgio Paulinho (POR)	Efapel	+ 8' 36"
10	Krists Neilands (LAT)	Israel Cycling Academy	+ 9' 35"
