= Sérgio Paulinho =

Portuguese road bicycle racer (born 1980)

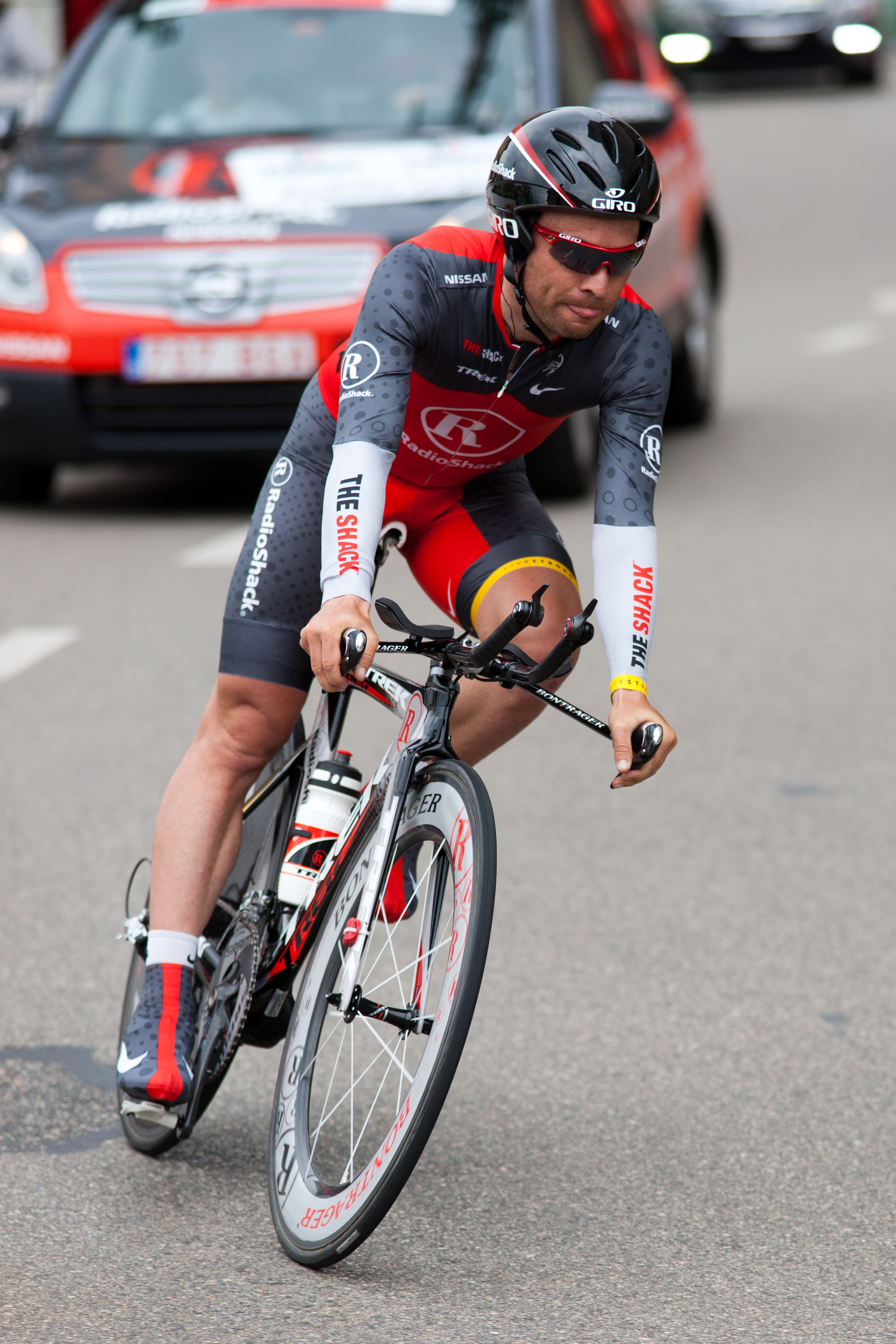
- Paulinho at the 2010 Tour de Romandie.

Personal information
- Full name: Sérgio Miguel Moreira Paulinho
- Born: 26 March 1980 (age 46) Oeiras, Portugal
- Height: 1.72 m (5 ft 8 in)
- Weight: 64 kg (141 lb; 10.1 st)

Cycling career
- Sport: Cycling
- Current team: Retired
- Discipline: Road
- Role: Rider
- Rider type: All-rounder

Professional teams
- 2003: ASC–Vila do Conde
- 2004: LA Alumínios–Pecol
- 2005–2006: Liberty Seguros–Würth
- 2007: Discovery Channel
- 2008–2009: Astana
- 2010–2011: Team RadioShack
- 2012–2016: Team Saxo Bank
- 2017–2020: Efapel
- 2021: LA Alumínios / LA Sport

Major wins
- Grand Tours Tour de France 1 individual stage (2010) 1 TTT stage (2009) Vuelta a España 1 individual stage (2006) One-day races and Classics National Time Trial Championships (2004, 2008)
Medal record
Representing Portugal
Men's road bicycle racing
Olympic Games
Silver medal – second place	2004 Athens	Individual road race

Sérgio Miguel Moreira Paulinho, ComIH (born 26 March 1980) is a Portuguese former prfoessional road bicycle racer. He was a domestique in the 2007, 2009 and 2010 Tour de France and won the silver medal for Portugal in the 2004 Athens Olympic Games.

== Career ==
Paulinho was born in Oeiras. After winning a bronze medal in the 2002 UCI Road World Championships, in under-23, in 2003, he became a professional cyclist and started gaining reference in one of the most important Portuguese teams LA Alumínios–Pecol–Bombarral. In 2004, he was 6th in the Volta a Portugal, winning two stages, including the final Individual time trial. In the 2004 Athens Olympic Games, he was silver medalist (Italy's Paolo Bettini got gold and Axel Merckx bronze) in the cycling road race. In 2004 he also won the Portuguese National Time Trial Championships and stages 7 and 10 of the Volta a Portugal.

Following his Olympic performance, he was signed by the Liberty Seguros–Würth team. He was implicated in the Operación Puerto doping case but was later cleared by Spanish officials of any links to the Operación Puerto doping case. He took his first Grand Tour stage win in the 2006 Vuelta a España, on stage 10. He joined the Discovery Channel team at the end of the season.

In 2008, he again won the Portuguese National Time Trial Championships. He joined Lance Armstrong's Team RadioShack in 2010, along with fellow countrymen Tiago Machado and directeur sportif José Azevedo. On 14 July 2010, he won the 10th stage of the Tour de France.

== Major results ==
2002
Volta a Portugal

1st Prologue, Stages 3 & 4

3rd Time trial, UCI World Under-23 Road Championships
10th Road race, UEC European Under-23 Road Championships
2003
9th Overall Volta a Portugal
2004
1st Time trial, National Road Championships
1st Overall Volta a Tras os Montes

1st Stage 1

1st Stage 3 Volta a Terras de Santa Maria
2nd Road race, Olympic Games
5th Overall GP Estremadura - RTP
6th Overall Volta a Portugal

1st Stages 7 & 10 (ITT)

7th Overall Troféu Joaquim Agostinho
2006
1st Stage 10 Vuelta a España
2008
1st Time trial, National Road Championships
2009
1st Stage 4 (TTT) Tour de France
2010
1st Stage 10 Tour de France
2012
6th GP Miguel Induráin
2013
2nd Overall Tour of Norway
2016
1st Stage 5 (TTT) Tour of Croatia
2017
2nd Clássica da Arrábida
3rd Time trial, National Road Championships
4th Clássica Aldeias do Xisto
7th Overall Troféu Joaquim Agostinho
9th Overall Volta a Portugal
2018
8th Clássica Aldeias do Xisto
2019
3rd Overall Troféu Joaquim Agostinho

=== Grand Tour general classification results timeline ===
Grand Tour	2006	2007	2008	2009	2010	2011	2012	2013	2014	2015	2016
Giro d'Italia	—	—	—	—	—	—	—	—	—	97	—
Tour de France	—	64	—	34	46	81	50	136	89	—	—
Vuelta a España	16	DNF	26	—	—	85	70	—	57	DNF	115
