= Amaro Antunes =

Portuguese bicycle racer

Personal information
- Full name: Amaro Manuel Raposo Antunes
- Born: 27 November 1990 (age 35) Vila Real de Santo António, Portugal
- Height: 1.73 m (5 ft 8 in)
- Weight: 58 kg (128 lb; 9.1 st)

Cycling career
- Sport: Cycling
- Current team: Suspended until 5 December 2026
- Discipline: Road
- Role: Rider

Amateur teams
- 2006: CC Loulé–Jardim Hotel–Euroaço
- 2007: ACD Milharado–Intermarché–Mafra
- 2008–2009: Crédito Agricola–Alcobaça CC
- 2010: Liberty Seguros–Santa Maria da Feira

Professional teams
- 2011: LA–Antarte
- 2012: Carmim–Prio
- 2013: Ceramica Flaminia–Fondriest
- 2014: Banco BIC–Carmim
- 2015–2016: LA Alumínios–Antarte
- 2017: W52 / FC Porto / Mestre da Cor
- 2018: CCC–Sprandi–Polkowice
- 2019: CCC Team
- 2020–2022: W52 / FC Porto

Major wins
- Stage races Volta a Portugal (2020)

Amaro Manuel Raposo Antunes (born 27 November 1990) is a Portuguese cyclist, who last rode for UCI Continental team W52 / FC Porto. In May 2019, he was named in the startlist for the 2019 Giro d'Italia. On 2 March 2023, he was suspended for doping retrospectively from 5 December 2022 until 5 December 2026 by the UCI. Some of his results including the 2017 and 2021 Volta a Portugal overall wins were then annulled.

== Major results ==
2008
National Junior Road Championships

1st Road race
1st Time trial

2011
1st Stage 5 Toscana-Terra di Ciclismo
2014
9th Overall Volta ao Alentejo
9th Overall Volta a Portugal
2015
4th Road race, National Road Championships
~~10th Overall Volta a Portugal~~
2016
1st Mountains classification Volta ao Alentejo
4th Road race, National Road Championships
~~6th Overall Volta a Portugal~~
7th Overall Volta Internacional Cova da Beira
10th Overall Volta ao Algarve
2017
1st Overall Troféu Joaquim Agostinho

1st Points classification
1st Mountains classification
1st Combination classification
1st Stage 2

1st Clássica da Arrábida
1st Overall Volta a Portugal

1st Mountains classification
1st Stage 9

~~5th Overall Volta ao Algarve~~

~~1st Stage 5~~

5th Clássica Aldeias do Xisto
8th Overall GP Beiras e Serra da Estrela
2018
1st Overall Tour of Małopolska

1st Stage 3

2nd Giro dell'Appennino
4th Overall Sibiu Cycling Tour

1st Stage 3a (TTT)

10th Overall Volta a la Comunitat Valenciana
10th Overall Szlakiem Grodów Piastowskich
2019
5th Time trial, National Road Championships
8th Overall Volta ao Algarve
2020
1st Overall Volta a Portugal

1st Stage 2

10th Overall Volta ao Algarve
2021
~~1st Overall Volta a Portugal~~

=== Grand Tour general classification results timeline ===
Grand Tour	2019
Giro d'Italia	54
Tour de France	—
Vuelta a España	—

== See also ==
- Doping in sport
- List of doping cases in cycling
