= Raúl Alarcón =

Spanish road bicycle racer

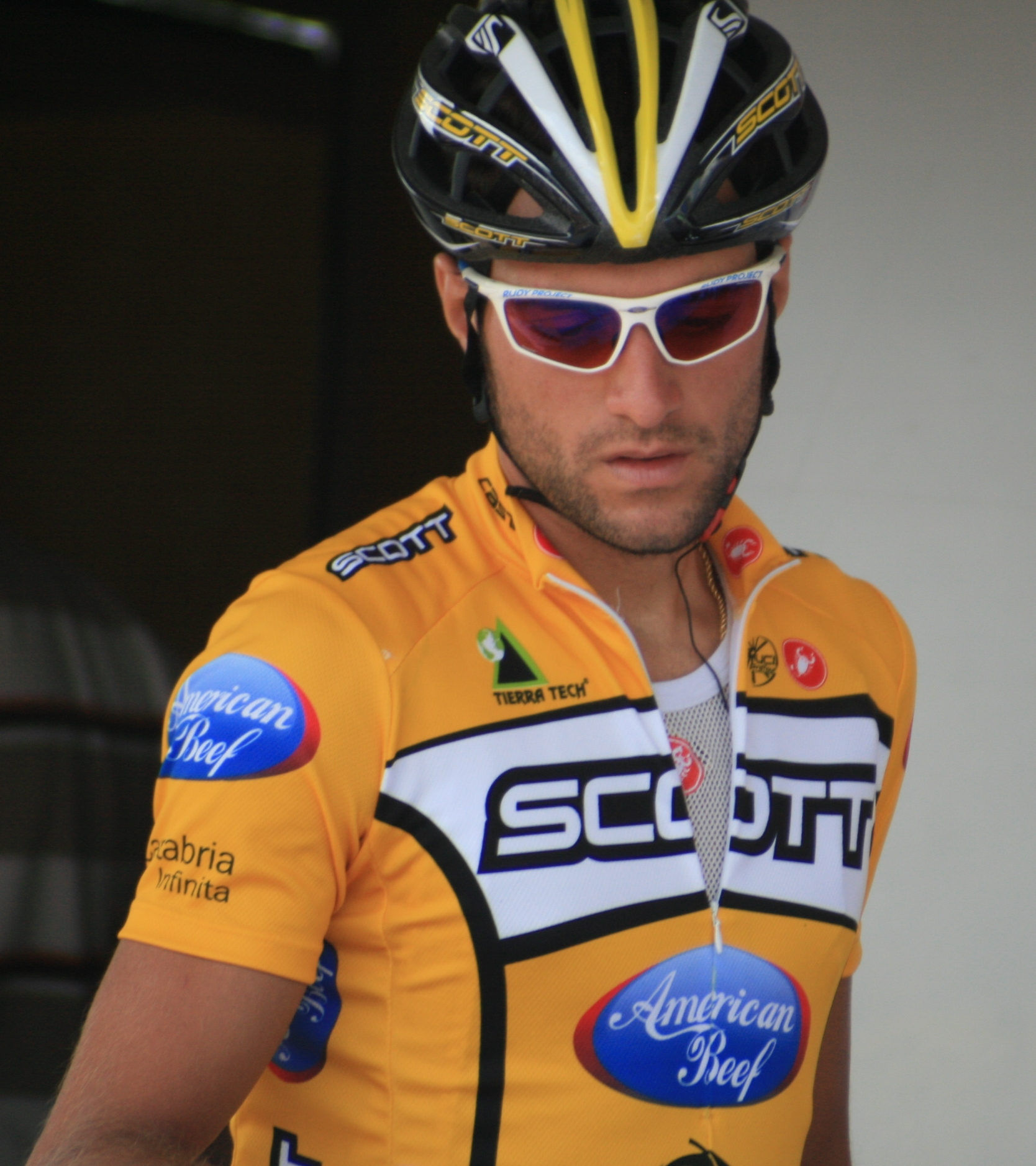

Personal information
- Full name: Raúl Alarcón García
- Born: March 25, 1986 (age 40) Sax, Valencia, Spain
- Height: 1.88 m (6 ft 2 in)
- Weight: 72 kg (159 lb)

Cycling career
- Sport: Cycling
- Current team: Suspended until 23 October 2023
- Discipline: Road
- Role: Rider
- Rider type: Climber

Amateur team
- 2009–2010: Asfaltos Guerola

Professional teams
- 2007–2008: Saunier Duval–Prodir
- 2011–2012: Barbot–Efapel
- 2013–2014: Louletano–Dunas Douradas
- 2015–2019: W52–Quinta da Lixa

Raúl Alarcón García (born March 25, 1986) is a Spanish professional road bicycle racer. Born in Sax, Valencia, Spain, he turned professional in 2007 with UCI ProTeam Saunier Duval–Prodir. On 10 March 2021, he was suspended for doping until 23 October 2023 and was stripped of 19 victories, including wins at Volta a Portugal in 2017 and 2018.

== Major results ==
2004
2nd Road race, National Junior Road Championships
2006
Vuelta a Cantabria

1st Stages 1 & 2

2008
10th Overall Volta a Lleida
2011
1st Stage 4 Troféu Joaquim Agostinho
2012
1st Sprints classification Volta ao Algarve
2013
1st Stage 7 Volta a Portugal
2014
1st Sprints classification Troféu Joaquim Agostinho
2015
4th Overall Tour do Rio
2016
~~1st Mountains classification Vuelta a Castilla y León~~
~~1st Mountains classification Vuelta a Asturias~~
~~3rd Overall Troféu Joaquim Agostinho~~

~~1st Points classification~~
~~1st Stage 2~~

~~4th Overall Volta a Portugal~~
2017
~~1st Overall Vuelta a Asturias~~

~~1st Points classification~~
~~1st Stage 3~~

~~1st Overall Volta a Portugal~~

~~1st Stages 1 & 4~~

~~2nd Overall Vuelta a la Comunidad de Madrid~~

~~1st Points classification~~
~~1st Stage 1~~

~~4th Overall GP Beiras e Serra da Estrela~~

~~1st Stage 3~~

2018
~~1st Overall GP Nacional 2 de Portugal~~

~~1st Mountains classification~~
~~1st Stage 1~~

~~1st Overall Volta a Portugal~~

~~1st Mountains classification~~
~~1st Stages 3, 4 & 9~~

~~3rd Clássica Aldeias do Xisto~~
2019
~~2nd Clássica da Arrábida~~
~~3rd Overall Volta ao Alentejo~~

== See also ==
- List of doping cases in cycling
