= Yannis Yssaad =

French cyclist

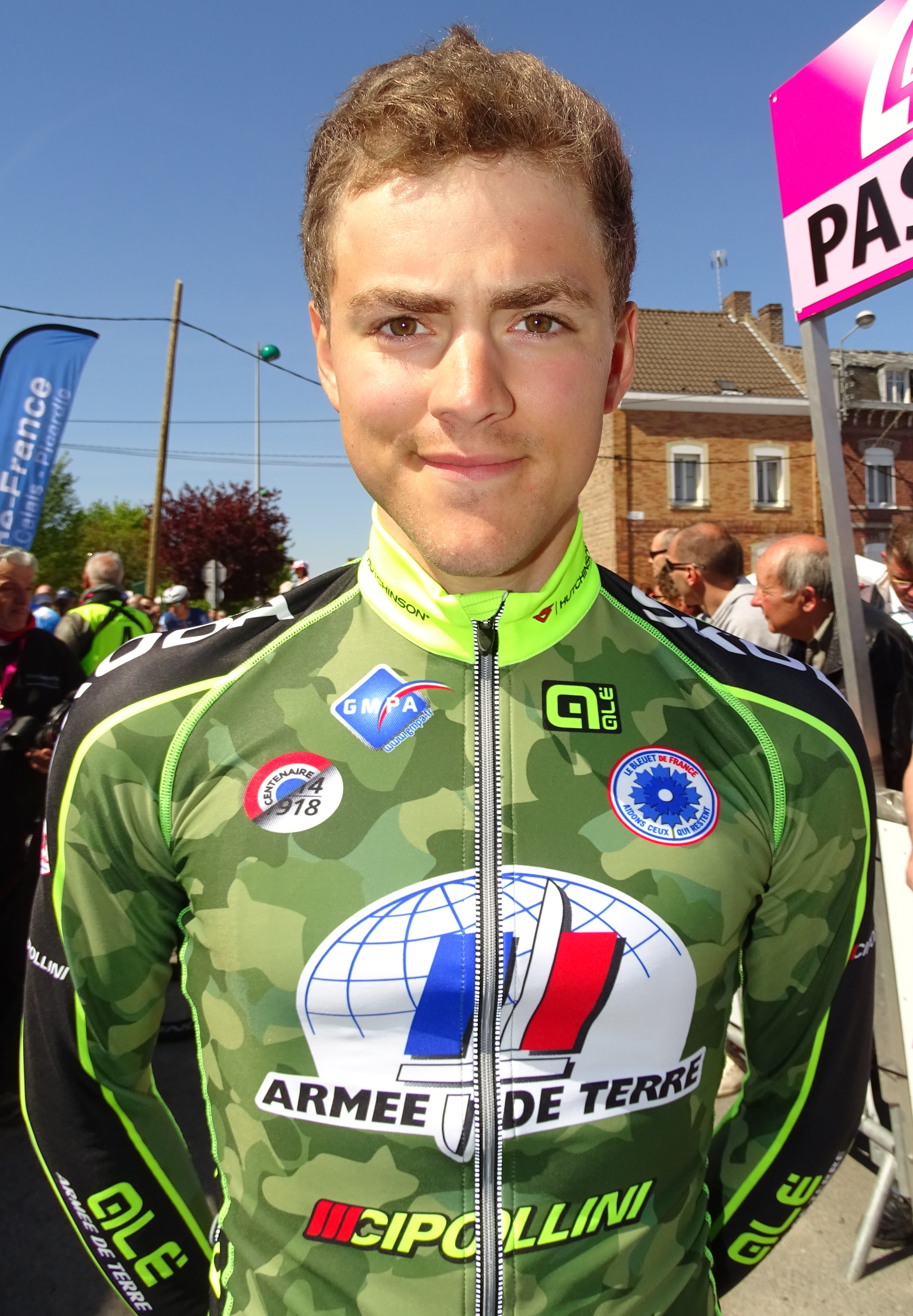
- Yssaad in 2016.

Personal information
- Full name: Yannis Yssaad
- Born: 25 June 1993 (age 33) Villeneuve-Saint-Georges, France

Cycling career
- Sport: Cycling
- Current team: Retired
- Discipline: Road
- Role: Rider

Amateur teams
- 2011: Argenteuil Val de Seine 95
- 2012–2013: CM Aubervilliers 93–BigMat
- 2015: Sojasun espoir–ACNC
- 2019: Team U Nantes Atlantique

Professional teams
- 2013: BigMat–Auber 93 (stagiaire)
- 2014: BigMat–Auber 93
- 2016–2017: Armée de Terre
- 2018: Caja Rural–Seguros RGA

Yannis Yssaad (born 25 June 1993) is a French former professional cyclist.

== Major results ==
2014
6th Grand Prix de Denain
2015
1st Stage 6 Tour de Bretagne
2016
1st Stage 4 Rhône-Alpes Isère Tour
3rd Cholet-Pays de Loire
3rd Grand Prix de la Somme
4th Route Adélie
2017
1st Paris–Troyes
1st Stage 6 Rás Tailteann
1st Stage 2 Ronde de l'Oise
Troféu Joaquim Agostinho

1st Stages 1 & 3a

2nd Grand Prix de la Ville de Lillers
7th Route Adélie
2018
1st Stage 4 Rhône-Alpes Isère Tour
