= Bryan Alaphilippe =

French cyclist

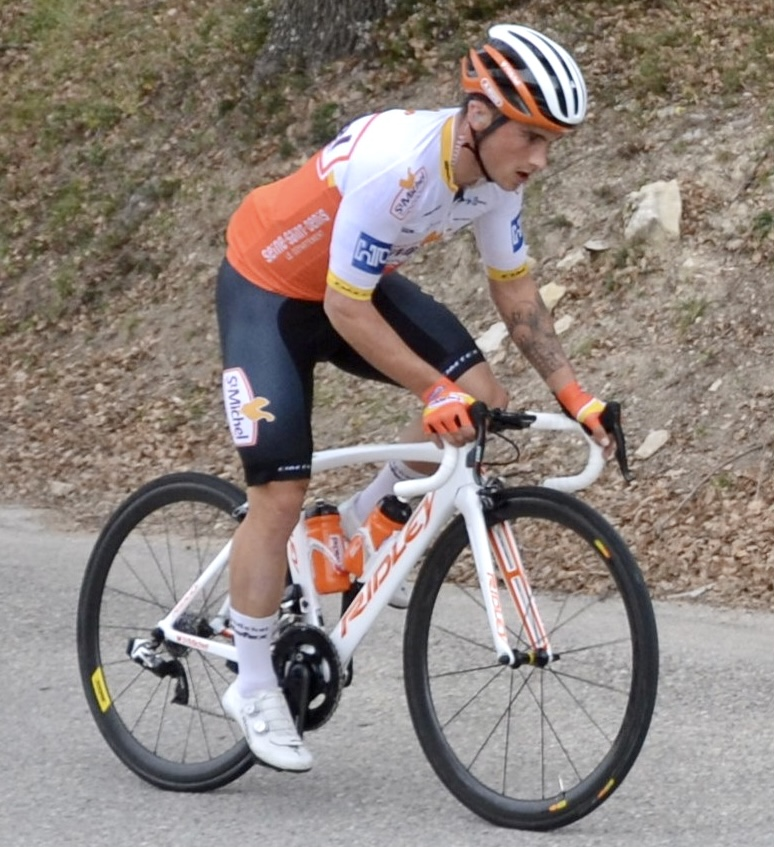
- Alaphilippe at the 2020 Tour de la Provence

Personal information
- Full name: Bryan Alaphilippe
- Born: 17 August 1995 (age 31) Saint-Amand-Montrond, France

Cycling career
- Sport: Cycling
- Current team: Retired
- Discipline: Road
- Role: Rider
- Rider type: Sprinter

Amateur teams
- 2012–2013: VC Lignierois Junior
- 2014: Guidon Chalettois
- 2018: Pro Immo Nicolas Roux
- 2019: Peltrax–CS Dammarie-lès-Lys
- 2021: Team UC Nantes Atlantique

Professional teams
- 2015–2017: Armée de Terre
- 2020: St. Michel–Auber93

Bryan Alaphilippe (born 17 August 1995) is a French former professional road cyclist. He retired in March 2021, while competing for French amateur team Team UC Nantes Atlantique. He is the younger brother of Julian Alaphilippe.

== Major results ==
2014
7th Paris–Mantes-en-Yvelines
2015
1st Bordeaux–Saintes
1st Circuit des 4 Cantons
2016
9th Grand Prix de Denain
2017
1st Stage 3 Volta a Portugal
4th Paris–Mantes-en-Yvelines
2019
1st Stage 4 Ronde de l'Oise
