= Rinaldo Nocentini =

Italian road racing cyclist

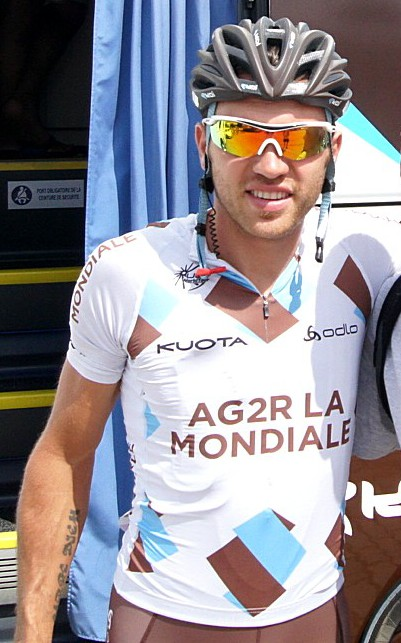
- Nocentini at the 2012 Tour de Pologne

Personal information
- Full name: Rinaldo Nocentini
- Born: 25 September 1977 (age 49) Montevarchi, Italy
- Height: 1.73 m (5 ft 8 in)
- Weight: 60 kg (132 lb)

Cycling career
- Sport: Cycling
- Discipline: Road
- Role: Rider
- Rider type: Puncheur

Professional teams
- 1999–2001: Mapei–Quick-Step
- 2002: Fassa Bortolo
- 2003: Formaggi Pinzolo Fiavé
- 2004–2006: Acqua & Sapone
- 2007–2015: AG2R Prévoyance
- 2016–2019: Sporting / Tavira

Rinaldo Nocentini (born 25 September 1977) is an Italian former professional racing cyclist, who competed professionally between 1999 and 2019 for the Mapei–Quick-Step, Fassa Bortolo, Formaggi Pinzolo Fiavé, Acqua & Sapone, AG2R La Mondiale and Sporting / Tavira teams.

In the 2009 Tour de France, his first participation in the race, he became leader in the General Classification after participating in a stage-long breakaway on stage 7 to take the yellow jersey from Fabian Cancellara with an overall time six seconds ahead of the second-place rider in the General Classification, Alberto Contador. He wore the yellow jersey for eight stages before relinquishing it to Contador at the end of stage 15.

== Major results ==
1995
3rd Road race, UCI Junior Road World Championships
1998
2nd Road race, UCI Under-23 Road World Championships
2nd Gran Premio Industrie del Marmo
1999
Tour de Langkawi

1st Stages 9 & 10

2002
5th Giro di Toscana
2003
1st Giro della Toscana
6th Overall Tour of Austria

1st Mountains classification

6th GP Industria & Artigianato di Larciano
6th Gran Premio Città di Camaiore
2004
1st Stage 5 Tour de Pologne
3rd Giro dell'Appennino
3rd Giro dell'Emilia
4th GP Industria & Artigianato di Larciano
5th Giro del Lazio
6th Giro del Veneto
10th Gran Premio di Chiasso
10th Gran Premio di Lugano
10th Giro di Toscana
2005
1st Subida al Naranco
2nd Coppa Sabatini
3rd Gran Premio Città di Camaiore
5th Tre Valli Varesine
6th Overall Regio-Tour
6th Giro del Veneto
6th Trofeo Melinda
7th Coppa Ugo Agostoni
9th Overall Tour of Austria
9th Giro del Lazio
2006
1st Giro dell'Appennino
1st Giro del Veneto
1st Coppa Placci
2nd Gran Premio Fred Mengoni
2nd Tre Valli Varesine
3rd Trofeo Laigueglia
4th Giro d'Oro
4th Giro di Toscana
5th Overall Tour Méditerranéen
6th Coppa Sabatini
8th Trofeo Matteotti
9th Trofeo Melinda
2007
1st GP Miguel Induráin
1st Stage 4 Tour Méditerranéen
6th La Flèche Wallonne
7th GP Ouest–France
2008
1st Gran Premio di Lugano
2nd Overall Paris–Nice
2nd Tour du Haut Var
4th Overall Tour Méditerranéen
7th Milan–San Remo
10th Giro dell'Emilia
2009
1st Stage 7 Tour of California
7th Grand Prix de Plumelec-Morbihan
9th Overall Critérium International
10th La Flèche Wallonne
Tour de France

Held from Stages 7–14

2010
1st Stage 1 Tour du Haut Var
2nd Overall Tour Méditerranéen
2011
3rd Overall Tour du Haut Var
3rd Gran Premio dell'Insubria-Lugano
6th Overall Tour de Pologne
7th Gran Premio di Lugano
9th Grand Prix Cycliste de Montréal
10th GP Miguel Induráin
2012
4th Overall Tirreno–Adriatico
5th Overall Critérium International
6th Overall Tour de Pologne
6th Overall Tour of Beijing
9th Overall Tour Méditerranéen
9th Amstel Gold Race
2013
3rd Strade Bianche
3rd Gran Premio Città di Camaiore
4th Gran Premio della Costa Etruschi
5th Overall Tour of Oman
10th La Flèche Wallonne
2014
2nd Milano–Torino
8th Overall Tour of Beijing
10th Giro di Lombardia
2016
1st Overall Troféu Joaquim Agostinho
2nd Overall Tour d'Azerbaïdjan
8th Overall Settimana Internazionale di Coppi e Bartali
2017
2nd Overall Volta ao Alentejo

1st Stage 1

2nd Overall Troféu Joaquim Agostinho
2nd Clássica Aldeias do Xisto
3rd Road race, National Road Championships
4th Overall Volta a Portugal
9th Overall Volta ao Algarve
2018
6th Overall La Tropicale Amissa Bongo

1st Stages 3 & 6

=== Grand Tour general classification results timeline ===
Grand Tour	2000	2001	2002	2003	2004	2005	2006	2007	2008	2009	2010	2011	2012	2013	2014	2015
Giro d'Italia	64	66	—	60	34	—	—	47	56	—	—	70	—	—	—	73
Tour de France	—	—	—	—	—	—	—	—	—	12	98	—	—	—	—	—
Vuelta a España	—	—	—	—	—	—	—	—	23	DNF	53	—	18	53	96	85

Legend
—	Did not compete
DNF	Did not finish
