= António Barbio =

Portuguese cyclist

Antonio Barbio
Personal information
- Full name: António André Pereira Barbio
- Born: 16 December 1993 (age 32) Torres Vedras, POrtugal
- Height: 1.81 m (5 ft 11 in)
- Weight: 62 kg (137 lb)

Cycling career
- Sport: Cycling
- Current team: Tavfer–Ovos Matinados–Mortágua
- Disciplines: Road, Track
- Role: Rider

Amateur teams
- 2008–2009: ACD Milharado–Intermarché–Mafra
- 2011: Belalgas Cósmetica–Mato–Cheirinhos
- 2012: Mortágua
- 2014: Anicolor–Mortágua

Professional teams
- 2013: Ceramica Flaminia–Fondriest
- 2016–2017: Efapel
- 2018: Miranda–Mortágua
- 2019: LA Alumínios / LA Sport
- 2022–: Tavfer–Mortágua–Ovos Matinados

Antonio Barbio (born 16 December 1993) is a Portuguese cyclist, who currently rides for UCI Continental team Tavfer–Ovos Matinados–Mortágua. He competed at the 2016 UEC European Track Championships in the scratch event.

== Major results ==
2011
1st Time trial, National Junior Road Championships
2012
National Under-23 Road Championships

2nd Road race
2nd Time trial

2nd Overall Volta a Portugal do Futuro
2013
2nd Road race, National Under-23 Road Championships
3rd Overall Volta a Portugal do Futuro
2017
1st Stage 7 Volta a Portugal
