= Pablo Guerrero (cyclist) =

Spanish cyclist (born 1992)

Personal information
- Full name: Pablo Guerrero Bonilla
- Born: 20 March 1992 (age 34) Coín, Spain
- Height: 1.73 m (5 ft 8 in)
- Weight: 56 kg (123 lb)

Cycling career
- Sport: Cycling
- Discipline: Road
- Role: Rider
- Rider type: Climber

Amateur teams
- 2012: Mutua Levante–Cafemax–Renault Ginestar
- 2013–2015: Bicicletas Rodríguez–Extremadura
- 2018: Ginestar-ULB Sports

Professional teams
- 2016–2017: Rádio Popular–Boavista
- 2018: Inteja Dominican Cycling Team
- 2019: Rádio Popular–Boavista
- 2020: Burgos BH

Pablo Guerrero Bonilla (born 20 March 1992) is a Spanish cyclist, who most recently rode for UCI ProTeam Burgos BH.

== Major results ==
2015
1st Road race, Andalusia Road Championships
1st Stage 3 Volta a Coruña
2018
1st Time Trial, Andalusia Road Championships
2nd Overall Vuelta a Zamora
10th Overall Tour Cycliste International de la Guadeloupe
2019
1st Marathon, National Mountain bike Championships
2020
1st Mountains classification Troféu Joaquim Agostinho
