= Xuban Errazkin =

Spanish cyclist

Personal information
- Full name: Xuban Errazkin Pérez
- Born: 25 August 1996 (age 30) Usurbil, Spain

Cycling career
- Sport: Cycling
- Discipline: Road
- Role: Rider

Amateur teams
- 2015: Hostal Latorre
- 2016: Café Baqué–Conservas Campos
- 2016: Wilier Triestina–Southeast (stagiaire)

Professional teams
- 2017: Rádio Popular–Boavista
- 2018–2019: Vito–Feirense–BlackJack

Xuban Errazkin Pérez (born 25 August 1996 in Usurbil) is a Spanish cyclist, who last rode for UCI Continental team Vito–Feirense–PNB.

== Major results ==
2016
1st Stage 1 Volta a Portugal do Futuro
2018
4th Overall Grand Prix Priessnitz spa
5th Overall Vuelta Ciclista Comunidad de Madrid

1st Young rider classification

10th Overall GP Beiras e Serra da Estrela
