= Domingos Gonçalves =

Portuguese cyclist

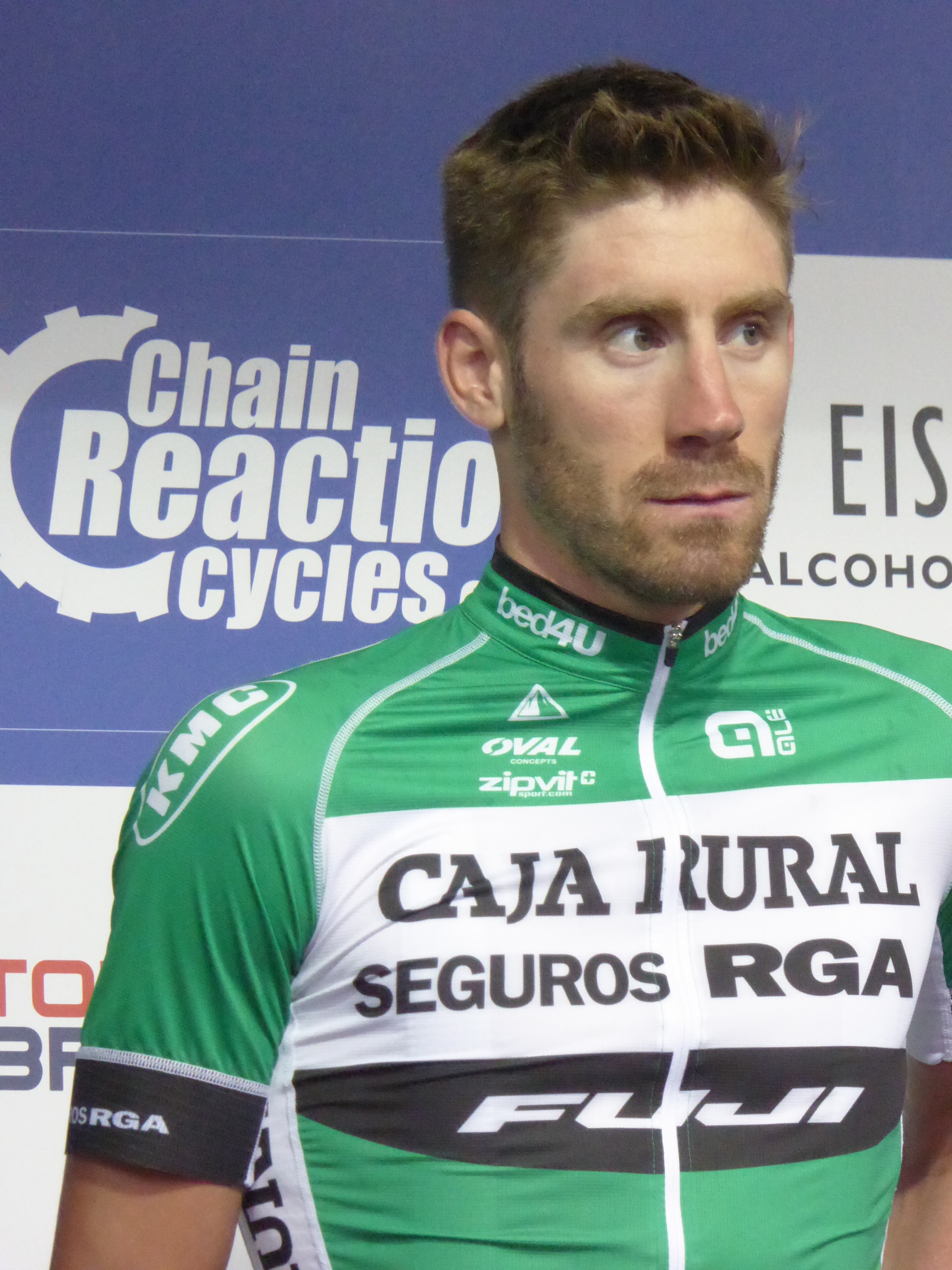
- Gonçalves at the 2016 Tour of Britain.

Personal information
- Full name: Domingos André Maciel Gonçalves
- Born: 13 February 1989 (age 37) Barcelos
- Height: 1.84 m (6 ft 0 in)
- Weight: 70 kg (150 lb; 11 st)

Cycling career
- Sport: Cycling
- Current team: Provisionally suspended
- Discipline: Road
- Role: Rider

Amateur team
- 2008–2011: Santa Maria da Feira–E-Leclerc–Moreira Congelados

Professional teams
- 2012–2013: Onda
- 2014: Team La Pomme Marseille 13
- 2015: Efapel
- 2016: Caja Rural–Seguros RGA
- 2017–2018: Rádio Popular–Boavista
- 2019: Caja Rural–Seguros RGA

Major wins
- One-day races and Classics National Road Race Championships (2018) National Time Trial Championships (2017, 2018)

Domingos André Maciel Gonçalves (born 13 February 1989 in Barcelos) is a Portuguese cyclist, who is provisionally suspended from the sport after an anti-doping rules violation. His brother, José, is also a professional cyclist. In August 2019, he was named in the startlist for the 2019 Vuelta a España.

== Major results ==
2011
2nd Road race, National Under-23 Road Championships
3rd Overall Volta a Portugal do Futuro
2013
1st Stage 2 Volta a Portugal do Futuro
2nd Time trial, National Road Championships
2014
4th Tour of Almaty
8th Tour du Finistère
2017
1st Time trial, National Road Championships
2018
National Road Championships

1st Road race
1st Time trial

Mediterranean Games

2nd Time trial
10th Road race

4th Clássica Aldeias do Xisto
5th Clássica da Arrábida
8th Overall GP Beiras e Serra da Estrela
9th Overall Volta a Portugal

1st Stage 6

2019
2nd Time trial, National Road Championships

=== Grand Tour general classification results timeline ===
Grand Tour	2019
Giro d'Italia	—
Tour de France	—
Vuelta a España	DNF

Legend
—	Did not compete
DNF	Did not finish
