= Vicente García de Mateos =

Spanish bicycle racer

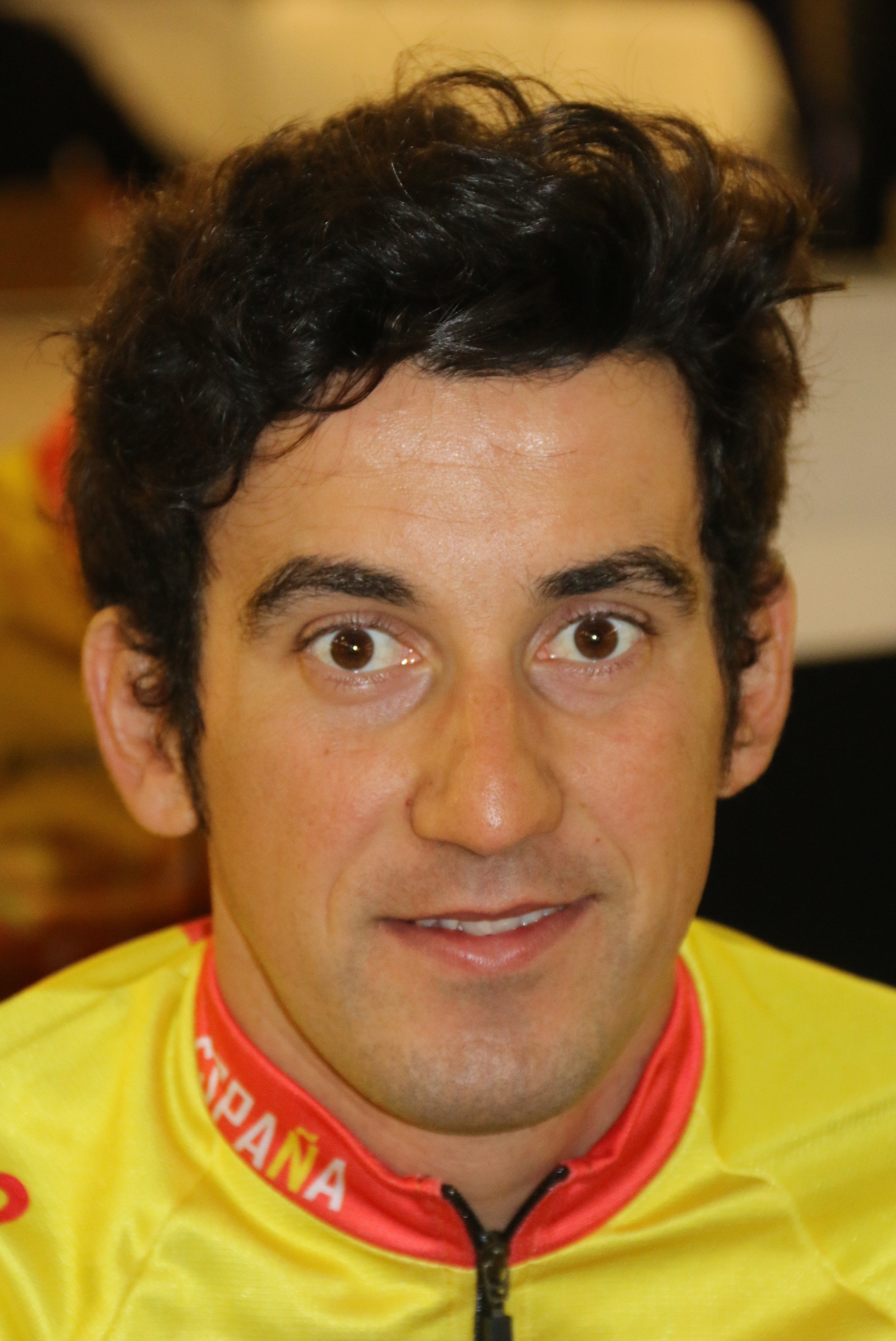
- García de Mateos in 2017

Personal information
- Full name: Vicente García de Mateos Rubio
- Born: 19 September 1988 (age 38) Manzanares, Ciudad Real, Spain
- Height: 1.80 m (5 ft 11 in)
- Weight: 68 kg (150 lb)

Cycling career
- Sport: Cycling
- Disciplines: Road; Track
- Role: Rider

Amateur teams
- 2008: ECP–Aluminis Sant Jordi
- 2010: Supermercados Froiz
- 2011: Caja Rural amateur
- 2012–2013: GSport–CA Valencia Terra I Mar

Professional teams
- 2009: Andorra–Grandvalira
- 2013: Matrix Powertag
- 2014–2020: Louletano–Dunas Douradas
- 2021–2023: Antarte–Feirense

Vicente García de Mateos Rubio (born 19 September 1988 in Manzanares, Ciudad Real) is a Spanish cyclist, who last rode for UCI Continental team ABTF Betão–Feirense. His brother Raúl García de Mateos is also a professional cyclist.

== Major results ==
2006
2nd Time trial, National Junior Road Championships
2010
3rd Overall Cinturó de l'Empordà
2013
4th Overall Tour de Hokkaido
10th Tour de Okinawa
2014
4th Vuelta a La Rioja
2015
1st Stage 1 Volta a Portugal
4th Overall GP Internacional do Guadiana
10th Overall GP Liberty Seguros
2016
3rd Overall GP Liberty Seguros

1st Points classification

7th Vuelta a La Rioja
8th Overall Volta a Portugal

1st Stage 5

2017
1st Clássica Aldeias do Xisto
3rd Overall Volta a Portugal

1st Points classification
1st Stage 8

3rd Trofeo Serra de Tramuntana
4th Clássica da Arrábida
6th Overall Troféu Joaquim Agostinho
10th Trofeo Porreres-Felanitx-Ses Salines-Campos
10th Trofeo Andratx-Mirador des Colomer
2018
3rd Overall Volta a Portugal

1st Points classification
1st Stages 2, 8 & 10

9th Trofeo Lloseta-Andratx
2019
2nd Overall GP Beiras e Serra da Estrela
5th Overall Vuelta a Asturias
10th Overall Vuelta a la Comunidad de Madrid
10th Overall Volta ao Alentejo
2020
3rd Road race, National Road Championships
2022
4th Clássica da Arrábida
