= João Benta =

Portuguese cyclist

Personal information
- Full name: João Ricardo Cardoso Benta
- Born: 21 December 1986 (age 39) Portugal
- Height: 1.79 m (5 ft 10 in)
- Weight: 60 kg (130 lb)

Cycling career
- Sport: Cycling
- Current team: Retired
- Discipline: Road
- Role: Rider

Amateur teams
- 2005: Gondomar–Coração de Ouro
- 2006: ASC–Cycles Oliveira–União Ciclista Vila do Conde
- 2007: Casactiva–Quinta das Arcas–Madeilongo
- 2008: Santa Maria da Feira–E. Leclerc–Moreira Congelados
- 2014: Concello do Porriño–CC Spol

Professional teams
- 2009–2010: Madeinox–Boavista
- 2015–2016: Louletano–Ray Just Energy
- 2017–2021: Rádio Popular–Boavista
- 2022: Efapel Cycling

João Ricardo Cardoso Benta (born 21 December 1986) is a Portuguese former cyclist, who competed as a professional from 2009 to 2022.

== Major results ==
2008
1st Overall Volta a Portugal do Futuro
2015
1st Overall Troféu Joaquim Agostinho

1st Stage 1
1st Points classification
1st Mountains classification

2016
4th Overall Troféu Joaquim Agostinho

1st Stage 1

9th Overall Volta Internacional Cova da Beira
2017
3rd Overall Vuelta a Asturias
6th Overall Volta Internacional Cova da Beira
7th Overall Volta a Portugal
2018
5th Overall Troféu Joaquim Agostinho
6th Overall Volta a Portugal
10th Time trial, National Road Championships
2019
6th Overall Volta a Portugal

1st Stage 8

2020
5th Overall Volta a Portugal
7th Overall Troféu Joaquim Agostinho
