= Feirense–Beeceler =

Portuguese cycling team

Team information
- UCI code: CDF
- Registered: Portugal
- Founded: 1983
- Discipline: Road
- Status: Professional (1987–1993); Continental (2018–)
- Bicycles: Swift
- Website: Team home page

Key personnel
- General manager: Rodrigo Nunes
- Team managers: Joaquim Andrade; Paulo Oliveira

Team name history
- 1984–1986 1987–1988 1989–1991 1992 1993–1994 1995–2017 2018 2019 2020 2021 2022–2024 2025–: Feirense–Ruquita; Ruquita–Feirense; Ruquita–Philips–Feirense; Philips–Etiel–Feirense (FEI); Imporbor–Feirense (FEI); Clube Desportivo Feirense; Vito–Feirense–Blackjack; Vito–Feirense–Pnb (CDF); Feirense (CDF); Antarte–Feirense (CDF); ABTF Betão–Feirense; Feirense–Beeceler
Jersey

Feirense–Beeceler (UCI team code: CDF) is a Portuguese professional road cycling team founded in 1983 that is currently based in Albergaria-a-Velha (former LA Alumínios / Metalusa Blackjack structure), competing on the UCI Continental Circuits.

== History ==
From Santa Maria da Feira, a municipality with a rich cycling tradition, C.D. Feirense established a development team in late 1983 named Feirense–Ruquita that entered the competition the following year.

It was the start of a decade competing in the sport, from 1987 onwards in the professional ranks, where its major achievement was an Volta a Portugal overall victory in 1990, with São Paio de Oleiros native Fernando Carvalho.

On 26 October 2017, to celebrate its centenary, Rodrigo Nunes, C.D. Feirense chairman, revealed the club return to the sport through a partnership with Fernando Vasco, Sport Ciclismo São João de Ver development team manager, and Fernando Pinto.

Fernando Pinto, former general manager and financial backer of LA Alumínios / Metalusa Blackjack, was retained as general manager, and retired cyclist Joaquim Andrade assumed the role of sports director.

== Team roster ==
As of 13 February 2024.

| Rider | Date of birth |
|---|---|
| Pedro Andrade (POR) | 31 May 2000 (age 26) |
| Óscar Cabedo (ESP) | 12 November 1994 (age 31) |
| António Carvalho (POR) | 25 October 1989 (age 36) |
| Fábio Costa (POR) | 4 July 1999 (age 27) |
| Tiano Da Silva (RSA) | 17 April 2001 (age 25) |
| Afonso Eulálio (POR) | 30 September 2001 (age 25) |

| Rider | Date of birth |
|---|---|
| Diogo Gonçalves (POR) | 15 May 2001 (age 25) |
| Diogo Oliveira (POR) | 3 December 2004 (age 21) |
| Fábio Oliveira (POR) | 25 October 1994 (age 31) |
| Francisco Pereira (POR) | 30 August 2000 (age 26) |
| Ivo Pinheiro (POR) | 9 August 1998 (age 28) |
| Pedro Silva (POR) | 7 July 2001 (age 25) |

== Major wins ==
1987
Young rider classification Volta a Portugal, Orlando Neves
1988
Combination classification Volta a Portugal, Fernando Carvalho
1990
Stage 1 Troféu Joaquim Agostinho, Andrzej Dulas
Overall Volta ao Algarve, Fernando Carvalho
Overall Volta a Portugal, Fernando Carvalho

Combination classification, Fernando Carvalho
Prologue (Note: The riders on the squad were Paulo Silva, José Mendes, Carlos Pereira, Andrzej Dulas, Amilcar Adão Neves and Fernando Carvalho)
Stage 7 & 16, Fernando Carvalho

1992
Porto–Lisboa, Oleg Logvin
Young rider classification Volta a Portugal, Quintino Rodrigues
2018
Stage 4 Volta ao Alentejo, Edgar Pinto
Overall Vuelta a la Comunidad de Madrid, Edgar Pinto

Under-23 classification, Xuban Errazkin
Stage 1, Edgar Pinto

Points classification GP Nacional 2 de Portugal, João Matias

Stage 5, João Matias
