= Clássica Aldeias do Xisto =

Race details
- Date: March/April
- Region: Portugal
- Discipline: Road
- Competition: UCI Europe Tour
- Type: One-day race
- Web site: aldeiasdoxisto.pt

History
- First edition: 2017
- Editions: 7 (as of 2024)
- First winner: Vicente García de Mateos (ESP)
- Most wins: Joni Brandão (POR); Frederico Figueiredo (POR)
- Most recent: Alexis Guérin (FRA)

Clássica Aldeias do Xisto is a one-day road cycling race held annually since 2017 in Portugal. It was part of the UCI Europe Tour in category 1.2 in 2017 and 2018. Since 2019, it has been on the Portuguese national calendar.

== Winners ==
Year	Country	Rider	Team
2017	Spain	Vicente García de Mateos	Louletano–Hospital de Loulé
2018	Portugal	Daniel Mestre	Efapel
2019	Portugal	Joni Brandão	Efapel
2020	No race due to COVID-19 pandemic		
2021	Portugal	Joni Brandão	W52 / FC Porto
2022	Portugal	Frederico Figueiredo	Glassdrive–Q8–Anicolor
2023	Portugal	Frederico Figueiredo	Glassdrive–Q8–Anicolor
2024	Uruguay	Mauricio Moreira	Sabgal–Anicolor
2025	France	Alexis Guérin	Anicolor / Tien 21
