= Louletano Desportos Clube (cycling) =

Portuguese cycling team

Aviludo–Louletano–Loulé Concelho
Team information
- UCI code: ALL
- Registered: Portugal
- Founded: 1982
- Discipline: Road
- Status: Trade Team III (2004); Continental (2005–2010); Amateur (2011–2012); Continental (2013–)
- Bicycles: Jorbi

Key personnel
- General manager: António do Adro
- Team managers: Jorge Piedade; Francisco Camacho

Team name history
- 1986 1986 (Note: From June 1986) 1987 1988–1989 2004 2005 2006 2007 2008 2009–2010 2011 2012 2013–2014 2015 2016–2017 2018 2019 2020 2021 2022–: Louletano–Bovis (LOU); Louletano–Construções Fol (LOU); Louletano–Construçoes Fol–Vale do Lobo (LOU); Louletano–Vale do Lobo (LOU); Imoholding–Loulé Jardim Hotel (ILJ); Imoholding–Loulé (IMO); Imoholding–Loulé Jardim Hotel (IMO); Madeinox–BRIC–Loulé (MAD); Centro Ciclismo de Loulé (CCL); C.C. Loulé–Louletano–Aquashow (CCL); Louletano–Loulé; Louletano–Dunas Douradas; Louletano–Dunas Douradas (LDD); Louletano–Ray Just Energy (LRJ); Louletano–Hospital de Loulé (LHL); Aviludo–Louletano–Uli (ALU); Ludofoods–Louletano; Aviludo–Louletano (AVL); Louletano–Loulé Concelho (LLC); Aviludo–Louletano–Loulé Concelho (ALL)

Louletano Desportos Clube, currently called Aviludo–Louletano–Loulé Concelho due to naming rights deals, is a Portuguese UCI Continental cycling team based in Loulé. Louletano Desportos Clube is the official, permanent name of the team which in turn is the cycling department of sports club Louletano Desportos Clube. The temporary naming rights of the team change according with new sponsorship deals on a season by season basis.

== Team roster ==
As of 13 February 2024.

Rider	Date of birth
Tomás Contte (ARG)	1 August 1998 (age 28)
Jesús del Pino (ESP)	9 September 1990 (age 36)
José Dias (POR)	20 June 2000 (age 26)
David Dominguez (ESP)	28 July 2000 (age 26)
Sergio García González (ESP)	11 June 1999 (age 27)

Rider	Date of birth
Gaspar Gonçalves (POR)	24 May 1995 (age 31)
Tomás Martins (POR)	14 January 2002 (age 24)
Carlos Oyarzún (CHI)	26 October 1981 (age 45)
German Tivani (ARG)	31 October 1995 (age 31)
Daniel Viegas (POR)	5 January 1998 (age 28)

== Major wins ==
2006
GP Ciudade de Vigo, César Quitério
2007
Vuelta a Extremadura, Nuno Marta

Stage 1, André Vital
Stage 3, Nuno Marta

Stage 3 GP CTT Correios de Portugal, André Vital
2009
Stage 2 GP Torres Vedras, João Cabreira
Stage 4 Volta a Portugal, João Cabreira
Stage 4 Volta a Portugal, Eladio Jiménez
2010
Subida al Naranco, Santiago Pérez
Overall Vuelta a Asturias, Constantino Zaballa

Stage 5, Constantino Zaballa

2012
Stage 1 Volta ao Alentejo, Jorge Montenegro
2013
Portugal National U23 Road Race Championships, Victor Valinho
Stage 7 Volta a Portugal, Raúl Alarcón
Pan-American Championships ITT, Carlos Oyarzun
2015
Overall Troféu Joaquim Agostinho, João Benta

Stage 1, João Benta

Stage 1 Volta a Portugal, Vicente Garcia de Mateos
2017
Classica Aldeias do Xisto, Vicente Garcia de Mateos
2018
Overall Volta ao Alentejo, Luis Mendonça
Stage 3 Troféu Joaquim Agostinho, Óscar Hernández
Stages 2, 8 & 10 Volta a Portugal, Vicente Garcia de Mateos
2020
Russia National Road Race Championships, Sergey Shilov
