= 2018 Volta ao Alentejo =

2018 UCI Europe Tour

Race details
- Dates: March 14–18, 2018
- Stages: 6
- Distance: 751.9 km (467.2 mi)

Results
Jersey awarded to the overall winner	Winner	Luís Mendonça (POR)	(Aviludo–Louletano)
	Second	Ricardo Mestre (POR)	(W52 / FC Porto)
	Third	Mark Downey (IRL)	(WIGGINS)
Jersey awarded to the points classification winner	Points	Dmitry Strakhov (RUS)	(Lokosphinx)
Jersey awarded to the mountains classification winner	Mountains	Alexander Evtushenko (RUS)	(Lokosphinx)
Jersey awarded to the youth classification winner	Youth	Mark Downey (IRL)	(WIGGINS)
	Team	W52 / FC Porto	

The 2018 Volta ao Alentejo–Crédito Argícola was 36th edition of the Volta ao Alentejo cycle race and was held on 14 March to 18 March 2018.

== Teams ==
The 21 teams invited to the race were:

UCI Professional Continental teams

- Caja Rural–Seguros RGA
- Burgos BH
- Euskadi–Murias
- WB Aqua Protect Veranclassic

UCI Continental teams

- Sporting / Tavira
- LA Alumínios
- Efapel
- Rádio Popular–Boavista
- W52 / FC Porto
- Aviludo–Louletano
- Vito–Feirense–BlackJack
- Miranda–Mortágua
- Liberty Seguros–Carglass
- Lokosphinx
- Fundación Euskadi
- WIGGINS

Under 23 teams

- Fortuna–Maia
- FGP–Cube–Bombarral
- Jorbi–Team José Maria Nicolau
- Sicasal–Constantinos–Delta Cafés
- Ginestar

== Stages ==
Stage characteristics and winners
Stage	Date	Course	Distance	Type	Winner
1	14 March	Vendas Novas to Serpa	173.5 km (108 mi)	Flat stage	Gabriel Cullaigh
2	15 March	Beja to Sines	205.2 km (128 mi)	Flat stage	Dmitry Strakhov
3	16 March	Grândola to Arraiolos	149.3 km (93 mi)	Flat stage	Dmitry Strakhov
4	17 March	Monforte to Portalegre	64.2 km (40 mi)	Hilly stage	Edgar Pinto
5	17 March	Castelo de Vide	8.4 km (5 mi)	Individual time trial	Gustavo Veloso
6	18 March	Castelo de Vide to Évora	151.3 km (94 mi)	Flat stage	Gabriel Cullaigh
	Total		751.9 km (467 mi)		

== Classification leadership ==
Classification leadership by stage
Stage	Winner	General classification	Points classification	Mountains classification	Young rider classification	Team classification
1	Gabriel Cullaigh	Gabriel Cullaigh	Gabriel Cullaigh	Alexander Evtushenko	Gabriel Cullaigh	WB Aqua Protect Veranclassic
2	Dmitry Strakhov	Mark Downey	Mark Downey	Alexander Evtushenko	Mark Downey	WIGGINS
3	Dmitry Strakhov	Mark Downey	Dmitry Strakhov	Alexander Evtushenko	Mark Downey	WIGGINS
4	Edgar Pinto	Mark Downey	Dmitry Strakhov	Alexander Evtushenko	Mark Downey	WIGGINS
5	Gustavo Veloso	Luís Mendonça	Dmitry Strakhov	Alexander Evtushenko	Mark Downey	W52 / FC Porto
6	Gabriel Cullaigh	Luís Mendonça	Dmitry Strakhov	Alexander Evtushenko	Mark Downey	W52 / FC Porto
Final		Luís Mendonça	Dmitry Strakhov	Alexander Evtushenko	Mark Downey	W52 / FC Porto

- In stage two, Justin Jules, who was second in the points classification, wore the black jersey, because first placed Gabriel Cullaigh wore the yellow jersey as leader of the general classification.
- In stage two, Mark Downey, who was second in the best young rider classification, wore the white jersey, because first placed Gabriel Cullaigh wore the yellow jersey as leader of the general classification.
- In stage three, Gabriel Cullaigh, who was second in the best young rider classification, wore the white jersey, because first placed Mark Downey wore the yellow jersey as leader of the general classification.
- In stage four, Gabriel Cullaigh, who was second in the best young rider classification, wore the white jersey, because first placed Mark Downey wore the yellow jersey as leader of the general classification.
- In stage five, Fernando Barceló, who was second in the best young rider classification, wore the white jersey, because first placed Mark Downey wore the yellow jersey as leader of the general classification.

== Final standings ==
Legend
General classification	Denotes the winner of the general classification	Points classification	Denotes the leader of the points classification
Mountains classification	Denotes the leader of the mountains classification	A white jersey	Denotes the winner of the young rider classification

=== General classification ===
Final general classification (1–10)
Rank	Rider	Team	Time
1	Luís Mendonça (POR)	Aviludo–Louletano	18h 25' 49"
2	Ricardo Mestre (POR)	W52 / FC Porto	+ 0' 08"
3	Mark Downey (IRL)	WIGGINS	+ 0' 13"
4	Mauricio Moreira (URU)	Caja Rural–Seguros RGA	+ 0' 16"
5	Dimitri Peyskens (BEL)	WB Aqua Protect Veranclassic	+ 0' 26"
6	Mark Donovan (GBR)	WIGGINS	+ 0' 30"
7	Fernando Barceló (ESP)	Euskadi–Murias	+ 0' 38"
8	Justin Jules (FRA)	WB Aqua Protect Veranclassic	+ 1' 57"
9	Óscar Hernández (ESP)	Aviludo–Louletano	+ 2' 18"
10	Nicola Toffali (ITA)	Sporting / Tavira	+ 2' 40"

Final general classification (11–109)
Rank	Rider	Team	Time
11	Gabriel Cullaigh (GBR)	WIGGINS	+ 3' 39"
12	Gustavo Veloso (ESP)	W52 / FC Porto	+ 4' 11"
13	James Fouché (NZL)	WIGGINS	+ 4' 30"
14	Ludovic Robeet (BEL)	WB Aqua Protect Veranclassic	+ 4' 31"
15	Daniel Freitas (POR)	W52 / FC Porto	+ 6' 29"
16	Jon Aberasturi (ESP)	Euskadi–Murias	+ 7' 44"
17	Samuel Caldeira (POR)	W52 / FC Porto	+ 8' 55"
18	Alexander Grigoryev (RUS)	Sporting / Tavira	+ 10' 35"
19	Aitor González (ESP)	Euskadi–Murias	+ 10' 42"
20	Dmitry Strakhov (RUS)	Lokosphinx	+ 10' 53"
21	Edgar Pinto (POR)	Vito–Feirense–BlackJack	+ 11' 23"
22	Josu Zabala (ESP)	Caja Rural–Seguros RGA	+ 11' 24"
23	Aritz Bagües (ESP)	Euskadi–Murias	+ 12' 51"
24	Henrique Casimiro (POR)	Efapel	+ 13' 06"
25	Alexander Vdovin (RUS)	Lokosphinx	+ 13' 15"
26	Ibai Salas (ESP)	Burgos BH	+ 14' 05"
27	Dmitri Sokolov (RUS)	Lokosphinx	+ 14' 16"
28	Alejandro Marque (ESP)	Sporting / Tavira	+ 15' 28"
29	Frederico Figueiredo (POR)	Sporting / Tavira	+ 15' 34"
30	Marc Buades (ESP)	Fundación Euskadi	+ 15' 46"
31	Óscar Pelegri (ESP)	Rádio Popular–Boavista	+ 15' 47"
32	Domingos Gonçalves (POR)	Rádio Popular–Boavista	+ 15' 59"
33	Soufiane Haddi (MAR)	Vito–Feirense–BlackJack	+ 16' 01"
34	Ibai Azurmendi (ESP)	Fundación Euskadi	+ 16' 38"
35	Hugo Nunes (POR)	Miranda–Mortágua	+ 16' 51"
36	David de la Fuente (ESP)	Aviludo–Louletano	+ 16' 57"
37	Rafael Reis (POR)	Caja Rural–Seguros RGA	+ 17' 41"
38	Artem Samolenkov (RUS)	Lokosphinx	+ 18' 02"
39	Matthew Teggart (IRL)	WIGGINS	+ 18' 25"
40	Gonzalo Serrano (ESP)	Caja Rural–Seguros RGA	+ 18' 44"
41	Mamyr Stash (RUS)	Lokosphinx	+ 19' 03"
42	Dylan Kerfoot-Robson (GBR)	WIGGINS	+ 19' 10"
43	Rafael Silva (POR)	Efapel	+ 19' 18"
44	Robert Scott (GBR)	WIGGINS	+ 20' 00"
45	Luís Fernandes (POR)	Aviludo–Louletano	+ 20' 27"
46	Óscar Rodríguez (ESP)	Euskadi–Murias	+ 20' 42"
47	Mikel Aristi (ESP)	Euskadi–Murias	+ 21' 30"
48	Daniel Mestre (POR)	Efapel	+ 21' 55"
49	Mario González (ESP)	Sporting / Tavira	+ 23' 55"
50	Antoine Warnier (BEL)	WB Aqua Protect Veranclassic	+ 24' 02"
51	Peio Goikoetxea (ESP)	Fundación Euskadi	+ 24' 50"
52	Francisco Campos (POR)	Miranda–Mortágua	+ 25' 04"
53	Luís Gomes (POR)	Rádio Popular–Boavista	+ 25' 08"
54	Nuno Almeida (POR)	LA Alumínios	+ 26' 58"
55	Luís Afonso (POR)	Vito–Feirense–BlackJack	+ 26' 59"
56	David Rodrigues (POR)	Rádio Popular–Boavista	+ 27' 03"
57	José Fernandes (POR)	W52 / FC Porto	+ 27' 11"
58	André Carvalho (POR)	Liberty Seguros–Carglass	+ 28' 28"
59	Jorge Magalhães (POR)	Miranda–Mortágua	+ 28' 47"
60	Sebastián Mora (ESP)	Ginestar	+ 28' 57"
61	Adrián González (ESP)	Burgos BH	+ 29' 59"
62	Marvin Sheulen (POR)	Sicasal–Constantinos–Delta Cafés	+ 29' 59"
63	Thomas Deruette (BEL)	WB Aqua Protect Veranclassic	+ 30' 09"
64	João Matias (POR)	Vito–Feirense–BlackJack	+ 30' 32"
65	Justin Oien (USA)	Caja Rural–Seguros RGA	+ 31' 00"
66	Raúl Alarcón (ESP)	W52 / FC Porto	+ 31' 09"
67	André Ramalho (POR)	Jorbi–Team José Maria Nicolau	+ 31' 42"
68	Venceslau Fernandes (POR)	Liberty Seguros–Carglass	+ 31' 56"
69	Álvaro Robredo (ESP)	Burgos BH	+ 31' 59"
70	Yuri Trofimov (RUS)	Rádio Popular–Boavista	+ 33' 11"
71	Gaspar Gonçalves (POR)	Liberty Seguros–Carglass	+ 34' 03"
72	Nícolas Sessler (BRA)	Burgos BH	+ 34' 07"
73	Kirill Sveshnikov (RUS)	Lokosphinx	+ 34' 18"
74	César Martingil (POR)	Liberty Seguros–Carglass	+ 34' 25"
75	Juán Martín (ESP)	Aviludo–Louletano	+ 35' 51"
76	Pedro Gil López (ESP)	Ginestar	+ 36' 53"
77	Gonçalo Leaça (POR)	LA Alumínios	+ 36' 55"
78	Ricardo García (ESP)	Fundación Euskadi	+ 37' 04"
79	Javi Amat (ESP)	Ginestar	+ 37' 10"
80	André Crispim (POR)	Liberty Seguros–Carglass	+ 37' 49"
81	James Mitri (GBR)	Burgos BH	+ 38' 10"
82	Alexander Evtushenko (RUS)	Lokosphinx	+ 38' 35"
83	Mikel Alonso (ESP)	Fundación Euskadi	+ 38' 38"
84	Álvaro Trueba (ITA)	Sporting / Tavira	+ 38' 46"
85	Egor Silin (RUS)	Rádio Popular–Boavista	+ 39' 16"
86	Valter Pereira (POR)	Sporting / Tavira	+ 39' 57"
87	David Ribeiro (POR)	LA Alumínios	+ 41' 50"
88	Txomin Juaristi (ESP)	Fundación Euskadi	+ 44' 47"
89	Franklin Six (BEL)	WB Aqua Protect Veranclassic	+ 45' 07"
90	Leonel Coutinho (POR)	Vito–Feirense–BlackJack	+ 45' 21"
91	Álvaro Cuadros (ESP)	Caja Rural–Seguros RGA	+ 45' 29"
92	Sergio Samitier (ESP)	Euskadi–Murias	+ 46' 06"
93	Marcos Jurado (ESP)	Efapel	+ 46' 24"
94	Sérgio Paulinho (POR)	Efapel	+ 47' 42"
95	Fábio Costa (POR)	Liberty Seguros–Carglass	+ 54' 48"
96	Guillaume Almeida (POR)	Fortuna–Maia	+ 59' 39"
97	Carlos Salgueiro (POR)	Sicasal–Constantinos–Delta Cafés	+ 1h 01' 56"
98	Kevyn Ista (BEL)	WB Aqua Protect Veranclassic	+ 1h 01' 58"
99	Álvaro López (ESP)	Ginestar	+ 1h 02' 33"
100	Jacobo Rodríguez (ESP)	Fortuna–Maia	+ 1h 03' 36"
101	Pablo Bonilla (ESP)	Ginestar	+ 1h 03' 36"
102	Nuno Meireles (POR)	Miranda–Mortágua	+ 1h 03' 41"
103	Hugo Sancho (POR)	Vito–Feirense–BlackJack	+ 1h 03' 54"
104	José Sousa (POR)	Miranda–Mortágua	+ 1h 04' 27"
105	Yannis Yssaad (FRA)	Caja Rural–Seguros RGA	+ 1h 04' 37"
106	João Santos (POR)	Vito–Feirense–BlackJack	+ 1h 05' 41"
107	Paulo Silva (POR)	Fortuna–Maia	+ 1h 08' 10"
108	Júlio Gonçalves (POR)	LA Alumínios	+ 1h 12' 40"
109	Márcio Barbosa (POR)	Aviludo–Louletano	+ 1h 14' 36"

=== Points classification ===
Final points classification (1–10)
Rank	Rider	Team	Points
1	Dmitry Strakhov (RUS)	Lokosphinx	76
2	Mark Downey (IRL)	WIGGINS	75
3	Gabriel Cullaigh (GBR)	WIGGINS	70
4	Justin Jules (FRA)	WB Aqua Protect Veranclassic	49
5	Luís Mendonça (POR)	Aviludo–Louletano	37
6	Jon Aberasturi (ESP)	Euskadi–Murias	35
7	Edgar Pinto (POR)	Vito–Feirense–BlackJack	29
8	Yannis Yssaad (FRA)	Caja Rural–Seguros RGA	20
9	Óscar Hernández (ESP)	Aviludo–Louletano	16
10	Mikel Aristi (ESP)	Euskadi–Murias	16

=== Mountains classification ===
Final mountains classification (1–10)
Rank	Rider	Team	Points
1	Alexander Evtushenko (RUS)	Lokosphinx	21
2	Henrique Casimiro (POR)	Efapel	15
3	Gustavo Veloso (ESP)	W52 / FC Porto	14
4	Edgar Pinto (POR)	Vito–Feirense–BlackJack	10
5	Ricardo Mestre (POR)	W52 / FC Porto	10
6	Luís Fernandes (POR)	Aviludo–Louletano	5
7	Luís Mendonça (POR)	Aviludo–Louletano	4
8	Txomin Juaristi (ESP)	Fundación Euskadi	3
9	Dimitri Peyskens (BEL)	WB Aqua Protect Veranclassic	2
10	Aitor González (ESP)	Euskadi–Murias	2

=== Young rider classification ===
Final young rider classification (1–10)
Rank	Rider	Team	Time
1	Mark Downey (IRL)	WIGGINS	18h 26' 02"
2	Mauricio Moreira (URU)	Caja Rural–Seguros RGA	+ 0' 03"
3	Mark Donovan (GBR)	WIGGINS	+ 0' 17"
4	Fernando Barceló (ESP)	Euskadi–Murias	+ 0' 25"
5	Gabriel Cullaigh (GBR)	WIGGINS	+ 3' 26"
6	James Fouché (NZL)	WIGGINS	+ 4' 17"
7	Dmitry Strakhov (RUS)	Lokosphinx	+ 10' 40"
8	Marc Buades (ESP)	Fundación Euskadi	+ 15' 33"
9	Ibai Azurmendi (ESP)	Fundación Euskadi	+ 16' 25"
10	Hugo Nunes (POR)	Miranda–Mortágua	+ 16' 38"

=== Team classification ===
Final team classification (1–10)
Rank	Team	Time
1	W52 / FC Porto	55h 19' 19"
2	WIGGINS	+ 0' 05"
3	WB Aqua Protect Veranclassic	+ 5' 02"
4	Euskadi–Murias	+ 9' 41"
5	Aviludo–Louletano	+ 16' 10"
6	Caja Rural–Seguros RGA	+ 20' 09"
7	Sporting / Tavira	+ 22' 03"
8	Lokosphinx	+ 34' 11"
9	Fundación Euskadi	+ 41' 58"
10	Efapel	+ 43' 02"
