= 2018 Tour of Britain =

2018 UCI Europe Tour
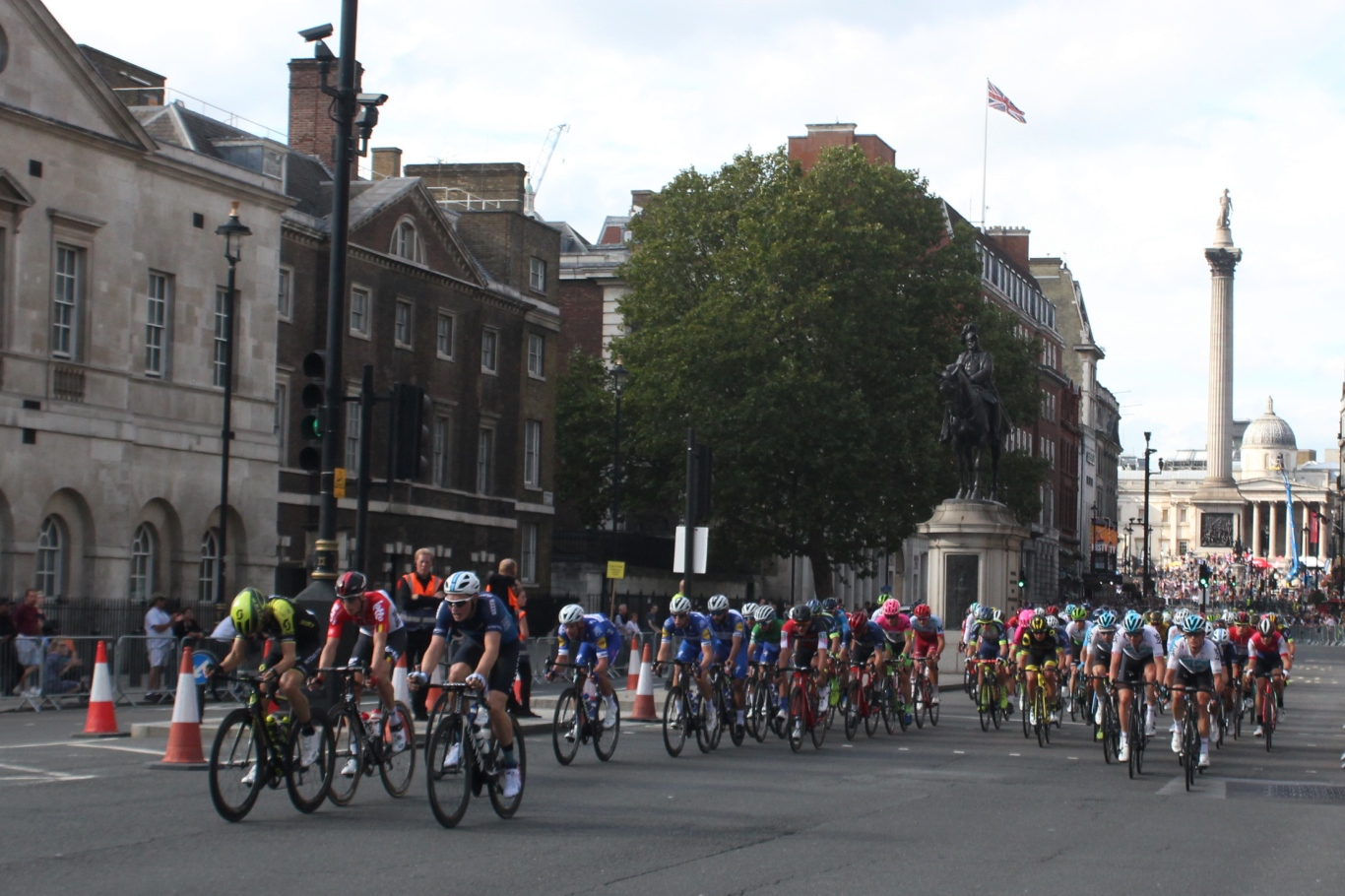
- Stage 8 in Whitehall, London having just passed Nelson's Column

Race details
- Dates: 2–9 September
- Stages: 8
- Distance: 1,140 km (708.4 mi)
- Winning time: 26h 25' 58"

Results
Jersey awarded to the overall winner	Winner	Julian Alaphilippe (FRA)	(Quick-Step Floors)
	Second	Wout Poels (NED)	(Team Sky)
	Third	Primož Roglič (SLO)	(LottoNL–Jumbo)
Jersey awarded to the points classification winner	Points	Patrick Bevin (NZ)	(BMC Racing Team)
Jersey awarded to the mountains classification winner	Mountains	Nicholas Dlamini (SAF)	(Team Dimension Data)
Jersey awarded to the sprints classification winner	Sprints	Alex Paton (GBR)	(Canyon Eisberg)
	Team	LottoNL–Jumbo	

The 2018 Tour of Britain was an eight-stage men's professional road cycling race. It was the fifteenth running of the modern version of the Tour of Britain and the 78th British tour in total. The race started on 2 September in Pembrey Country Park and finished on 9 September in London. It was part of the 2018 UCI Europe Tour. The French rider Julian Alaphilippe of Quick-Step Floors won the race.

== Teams ==
Aqua Blue Sport were replaced by WIGGINS less than week before the start of the race. The starting teams were:

UCI WorldTeams
- BMC Racing Team
- Team Dimension Data
- EF Education First–Drapac p/b Cannondale
- Team Katusha–Alpecin
- Lotto–Soudal
- LottoNL–Jumbo
- Mitchelton–Scott
- Movistar Team
- Quick-Step Floors
- Team Sky
- Team Sunweb
UCI Professional Continental Teams
- Bardiani–CSF
- Direct Énergie
- Wanty–Groupe Gobert
UCI Continental Teams
- Canyon Eisberg
- JLT–Condor
- Madison Genesis
- ONE Pro Cycling
- WIGGINS
National Teams
- Great Britain

== Stages ==
List of stages
Stage	Date	Course	Distance	Type	Winner
1	2 September	Pembrey – Newport	175 km (109 mi)	Flat stage	André Greipel (GER)
2	3 September	Cranbrook – Barnstaple	174 km (108 mi)	Flat stage	Cameron Meyer (AUS)
3	4 September	Bristol – Bristol	125 km (78 mi)	Hilly stage	Julian Alaphilippe (FRA)
4	5 September	Nuneaton – Leamington Spa	183 km (114 mi)	Flat stage	André Greipel (GER)
5	6 September	Cockermouth – Whinlatter Pass	14 km (9 mi)	Team time trial	LottoNL–Jumbo
6	7 September	Barrow-in-Furness – Whinlatter Pass	169 km (105 mi)	Hilly stage	Wout Poels (NED)
7	8 September	West Bridgford – Mansfield	223 km (139 mi)	Flat stage	Ian Stannard (GBR)
8	9 September	London – London	77 km (48 mi)	Flat stage	Caleb Ewan (AUS)

=== Stage 1 ===
2 September 2018 — Pembrey to Newport, 175 km (109 mi)

Stage 1 result
Rank	Rider	Team	Time
1	André Greipel (GER)	Lotto–Soudal	4h 00' 54"
2	Caleb Ewan (AUS)	Mitchelton–Scott	s.t.
3	Fernando Gaviria (COL)	Quick-Step Floors	s.t.
4	Gabriel Cullaigh (GBR)	WIGGINS	s.t.
5	Jürgen Roelandts (BEL)	BMC Racing Team	s.t.
6	Andrea Pasqualon (ITA)	Wanty–Groupe Gobert	s.t.
7	Ethan Hayter (GBR)	Great Britain	s.t.
8	Paolo Simion (ITA)	Bardiani–CSF	s.t.
9	Vincenzo Albanese (ITA)	Bardiani–CSF	s.t.
10	Wout Poels (NED)	Team Sky	s.t.

General classification after stage 1
Rank	Rider	Team	Time
1	André Greipel (GER)	Lotto–Soudal	4h 00' 54"
2	Caleb Ewan (AUS)	Mitchelton–Scott	+ 4"
3	Fernando Gaviria (COL)	Quick-Step Floors	+ 6"
4	Gabriel Cullaigh (GBR)	WIGGINS	+ 10"
5	Jürgen Roelandts (BEL)	BMC Racing Team	s.t.
6	Andrea Pasqualon (ITA)	Wanty–Groupe Gobert	s.t.
7	Ethan Hayter (GBR)	Great Britain	s.t.
8	Paolo Simion (ITA)	Bardiani–CSF	s.t.
9	Vincenzo Albanese (ITA)	Bardiani–CSF	s.t.
10	Wout Poels (NED)	Team Sky	s.t.

=== Stage 2 ===
3 September 2018 — Cranbrook to Barnstaple, 174 km (108 mi)

Stage 2 result
Rank	Rider	Team	Time
1	Cameron Meyer (AUS)	Mitchelton–Scott	4h 14' 46"
2	Alessandro Tonelli (ITA)	Bardiani–CSF	+ 1"
3	Patrick Bevin (NZL)	BMC Racing Team	+ 2"
4	Julian Alaphilippe (FRA)	Quick-Step Floors	s.t.
5	Jasha Sütterlin (GER)	Movistar Team	s.t.
6	Primož Roglič (SLO)	LottoNL–Jumbo	s.t.
7	Wout Poels (NED)	Team Sky	s.t.
8	Chris Hamilton (AUS)	Team Sunweb	s.t.
9	Bob Jungels (LUX)	Quick-Step Floors	s.t.
10	Hugh Carthy (GBR)	EF Education First–Drapac p/b Cannondale	+ 9"

General classification after stage 2
Rank	Rider	Team	Time
1	Alessandro Tonelli (ITA)	Bardiani–CSF	8h 15' 30"
2	Cameron Meyer (AUS)	Mitchelton–Scott	s.t.
3	Patrick Bevin (NZL)	BMC Racing Team	+ 8"
4	Wout Poels (NED)	Team Sky	+ 12"
5	Jasha Sütterlin (GER)	Movistar Team	s.t.
6	Chris Hamilton (AUS)	Team Sunweb	s.t.
7	Julian Alaphilippe (FRA)	Quick-Step Floors	s.t.
8	Bob Jungels (LUX)	Quick-Step Floors	s.t.
9	Primož Roglič (SLO)	LottoNL–Jumbo	s.t.
10	Hugh Carthy (GBR)	EF Education First–Drapac p/b Cannondale	+ 19"

=== Stage 3 ===
4 September 2018 — Bristol to Bristol, 125 km (78 mi)

Stage 3 result
Rank	Rider	Team	Time
1	Julian Alaphilippe (FRA)	Quick-Step Floors	2h 47' 41"
2	Patrick Bevin (NZL)	BMC Racing Team	s.t.
3	Emīls Liepiņš (LAT)	ONE Pro Cycling	s.t.
4	Ethan Hayter (GBR)	Great Britain	s.t.
5	André Greipel (GER)	Lotto–Soudal	s.t.
6	Connor Swift (GBR)	Madison Genesis	s.t.
7	Mads Würtz Schmidt (DEN)	Team Katusha–Alpecin	s.t.
8	Jasha Sütterlin (GER)	Movistar Team	s.t.
9	Dion Smith (NZL)	Wanty–Groupe Gobert	s.t.
10	Xandro Meurisse (BEL)	Wanty–Groupe Gobert	s.t.

General classification after stage 3
Rank	Rider	Team	Time
1	Patrick Bevin (NZL)	BMC Racing Team	11h 03' 11"
2	Cameron Meyer (AUS)	Mitchelton–Scott	s.t.
3	Julian Alaphilippe (FRA)	Quick-Step Floors	+ 2"
4	Jasha Sütterlin (GER)	Movistar Team	+ 12"
5	Wout Poels (NED)	Team Sky	s.t.
6	Chris Hamilton (AUS)	Team Sunweb	s.t.
7	Bob Jungels (LUX)	Quick-Step Floors	s.t.
8	Primož Roglič (SLO)	LottoNL–Jumbo	s.t.
9	Hugh Carthy (GBR)	EF Education First–Drapac p/b Cannondale	+ 19"
10	Scott Davies (GBR)	Team Dimension Data	+ 22"

=== Stage 4 ===
5 September 2018 — Nuneaton to Leamington Spa, 183 km (114 mi)

Stage 4 result
Rank	Rider	Team	Time
1	André Greipel (GER)	Lotto–Soudal	4h 22' 04"
2	Sacha Modolo (ITA)	EF Education First–Drapac p/b Cannondale	s.t.
3	Patrick Bevin (NZL)	BMC Racing Team	s.t.
4	Rick Zabel (GER)	Team Katusha–Alpecin	s.t.
5	Carlos Barbero (ESP)	Movistar Team	s.t.
6	Emīls Liepiņš (LAT)	ONE Pro Cycling	s.t.
7	Romain Cardis (FRA)	Direct Énergie	s.t.
8	Daniel McLay (GBR)	EF Education First–Drapac p/b Cannondale	s.t.
9	Andrew Tennant (GBR)	Canyon Eisberg	s.t.
10	Gabriel Cullaigh (GBR)	WIGGINS	s.t.

General classification after stage 4
Rank	Rider	Team	Time
1	Patrick Bevin (NZL)	BMC Racing Team	15h 25' 11"
2	Cameron Meyer (AUS)	Mitchelton–Scott	+ 4"
3	Julian Alaphilippe (FRA)	Quick-Step Floors	+ 6"
4	Jasha Sütterlin (GER)	Movistar Team	+ 16"
5	Wout Poels (NED)	Team Sky	s.t.
6	Chris Hamilton (AUS)	Team Sunweb	s.t.
7	Bob Jungels (LUX)	Quick-Step Floors	s.t.
8	Primož Roglič (SLO)	LottoNL–Jumbo	s.t.
9	Hugh Carthy (GBR)	EF Education First–Drapac p/b Cannondale	+ 23"
10	Scott Davies (GBR)	Team Dimension Data	+ 26"

=== Stage 5 ===
6 September 2018 — Cockermouth to Whinlatter Pass, 14 km (9 mi) (TTT)

Stage 5 result
Rank	Team	Time
1	LottoNL–Jumbo	19' 37"
2	Quick-Step Floors	+ 17"
3	Team Katusha–Alpecin	+ 21"
4	Team Sky	+ 26"
5	Movistar Team	+ 36"
6	BMC Racing Team	+ 41"
7	Mitchelton–Scott	+ 55"
8	Team Sunweb	+ 1' 06"
9	Direct Énergie	+ 1' 10"
10	Great Britain	+ 1' 19"

General classification after stage 5
Rank	Rider	Team	Time
1	Primož Roglič (SLO)	LottoNL–Jumbo	15h 45' 04"
2	Julian Alaphilippe (FRA)	Quick-Step Floors	+ 6"
3	Bob Jungels (LUX)	Quick-Step Floors	+ 16"
4	Patrick Bevin (NZL)	BMC Racing Team	+ 24"
5	Wout Poels (NED)	Team Sky	+ 26"
6	Pascal Eenkhoorn (NED)	LottoNL–Jumbo	+ 34"
7	Jasha Sütterlin (GER)	Movistar Team	+ 36"
8	Jos van Emden (NED)	LottoNL–Jumbo	+ 37"
9	Neilson Powless (USA)	LottoNL–Jumbo	s.t.
10	Cameron Meyer (AUS)	Mitchelton–Scott	+ 42"

=== Stage 6 ===
7 September 2018 — Barrow-in-Furness to Whinlatter Pass, 169 km (105 mi)

Stage 6 result
Rank	Rider	Team	Time
1	Wout Poels (NED)	Team Sky	4h 01' 51"
2	Julian Alaphilippe (FRA)	Quick-Step Floors	+ 2"
3	Hugh Carthy (GBR)	EF Education First–Drapac p/b Cannondale	+ 12"
4	Jonathan Hivert (FRA)	Direct Énergie	+ 21"
5	Patrick Bevin (NZL)	BMC Racing Team	s.t.
6	Tom Pidcock (GBR)	WIGGINS	s.t.
7	Xandro Meurisse (BEL)	Wanty–Groupe Gobert	s.t.
8	Dion Smith (NZL)	Wanty–Groupe Gobert	s.t.
9	Max Stedman (GBR)	Canyon Eisberg	s.t.
10	Jasha Sütterlin (GER)	Movistar Team	s.t.

General classification after stage 6
Rank	Rider	Team	Time
1	Julian Alaphilippe (FRA)	Quick-Step Floors	19h 46' 54"
2	Wout Poels (NED)	Team Sky	+ 17"
3	Primož Roglič (SLO)	LottoNL–Jumbo	+ 33"
4	Patrick Bevin (NZL)	BMC Racing Team	+ 46"
5	Bob Jungels (LUX)	Quick-Step Floors	+ 51"
6	Jasha Sütterlin (GER)	Movistar Team	+ 58"
7	Neilson Powless (USA)	LottoNL–Jumbo	+ 1' 10"
8	Dmitry Strakhov (RUS)	Team Katusha–Alpecin	+ 1' 24"
9	Chris Hamilton (AUS)	Team Sunweb	+ 1' 28"
10	Pascal Eenkhoorn (NED)	LottoNL–Jumbo	+ 1' 35"

=== Stage 7 ===
8 September 2018 — West Bridgford to Mansfield, 223 km (139 mi)

Stage 7 result
Rank	Rider	Team	Time
1	Ian Stannard (GBR)	Team Sky	4h 56' 27"
2	Nils Politt (GER)	Team Katusha–Alpecin	+ 59"
3	Giovanni Carboni (ITA)	Bardiani–CSF	+ 3' 09"
4	Mark McNally (GBR)	Wanty–Groupe Gobert	+ 3' 54"
5	Emīls Liepiņš (LAT)	ONE Pro Cycling	+ 4' 04"
6	Patrick Bevin (NZL)	BMC Racing Team	s.t.
7	Ethan Hayter (GBR)	Great Britain	s.t.
8	Paolo Simion (ITA)	Bardiani–CSF	s.t.
9	Andrew Tennant (GBR)	Canyon Eisberg	s.t.
10	Nils Eekhoff (NED)	Team Sunweb	s.t.

General classification after stage 7
Rank	Rider	Team	Time
1	Julian Alaphilippe (FRA)	Quick-Step Floors	24h 47' 25"
2	Wout Poels (NED)	Team Sky	+ 17"
3	Primož Roglič (SLO)	LottoNL–Jumbo	+ 33"
4	Patrick Bevin (NZL)	BMC Racing Team	+ 46"
5	Bob Jungels (LUX)	Quick-Step Floors	+ 51"
6	Jasha Sütterlin (GER)	Movistar Team	+ 58"
7	Neilson Powless (USA)	LottoNL–Jumbo	+ 1' 10"
8	Dmitry Strakhov (RUS)	Team Katusha–Alpecin	+ 1' 24"
9	Chris Hamilton (AUS)	Team Sunweb	+ 1' 28"
10	Pascal Eenkhoorn (NED)	LottoNL–Jumbo	+ 1' 35"

=== Stage 8 ===
9 September 2018 — London to London, 77 km (48 mi)

Stage 8 result
Rank	Rider	Team	Time
1	Caleb Ewan (AUS)	Mitchelton–Scott	1h 38' 33"
2	Fernando Gaviria (COL)	Quick-Step Floors	s.t.
3	Jasper De Buyst (BEL)	Lotto–Soudal	s.t.
4	Andrea Pasqualon (ITA)	Wanty–Groupe Gobert	s.t.
5	Ethan Hayter (GBR)	Great Britain	s.t.
6	Dion Smith (NZL)	Wanty–Groupe Gobert	s.t.
7	Jean-Pierre Drucker (LUX)	BMC Racing Team	s.t.
8	Nils Eekhoff (NED)	Team Sunweb	s.t.
9	Paolo Simion (ITA)	Bardiani–CSF	s.t.
10	Patrick Bevin (NZL)	BMC Racing Team	s.t.

General classification after stage 8
Rank	Rider	Team	Time
1	Julian Alaphilippe (FRA)	Quick-Step Floors	26h 25' 58"
2	Wout Poels (NED)	Team Sky	+ 17"
3	Primož Roglič (SLO)	LottoNL–Jumbo	+ 33"
4	Patrick Bevin (NZL)	BMC Racing Team	+ 42"
5	Bob Jungels (LUX)	Quick-Step Floors	+ 51"
6	Jasha Sütterlin (GER)	Movistar Team	+ 58"
7	Neilson Powless (USA)	LottoNL–Jumbo	+ 1' 10"
8	Dmitry Strakhov (RUS)	Team Katusha–Alpecin	+ 1' 21"
9	Chris Hamilton (AUS)	Team Sunweb	+ 1' 28"
10	Pascal Eenkhoorn (NED)	LottoNL–Jumbo	+ 1' 34"

== Classification leadership ==
Classification leadership by stage
Stage	Winner	General classification	Points classification	Mountains classification	Sprints classification	Team classification	Combativity
1	André Greipel	André Greipel	André Greipel	Nicholas Dlamini	Matthew Bostock	Great Britain	Matthew Bostock
2	Cameron Meyer	Alessandro Tonelli	Cameron Meyer	Scott Davies	Matthew Teggart	Quick-Step Floors	Scott Davies
3	Julian Alaphilippe	Patrick Bevin	Julian Alaphilippe	Scott Davies	Matthew Teggart	Movistar Team	Tony Martin
4	André Greipel	Patrick Bevin	Patrick Bevin	Nicholas Dlamini	Matthew Holmes	Movistar Team	Hayden McCormick
5	LottoNL–Jumbo	Primož Roglič	Patrick Bevin	Nicholas Dlamini	Matthew Holmes	LottoNL–Jumbo	Hayden McCormick
6	Wout Poels	Julian Alaphilippe	Patrick Bevin	Nicholas Dlamini	Matthew Holmes	LottoNL–Jumbo	James Shaw
7	Ian Stannard	Julian Alaphilippe	Patrick Bevin	Nicholas Dlamini	Alex Paton	LottoNL–Jumbo	Ian Stannard
8	Caleb Ewan	Julian Alaphilippe	Patrick Bevin	Nicholas Dlamini	Alex Paton	LottoNL–Jumbo	Vasil Kiryienka
Final		Julian Alaphilippe	Patrick Bevin	Nicholas Dlamini	Alex Paton	LottoNL–Jumbo	Matthew Holmes

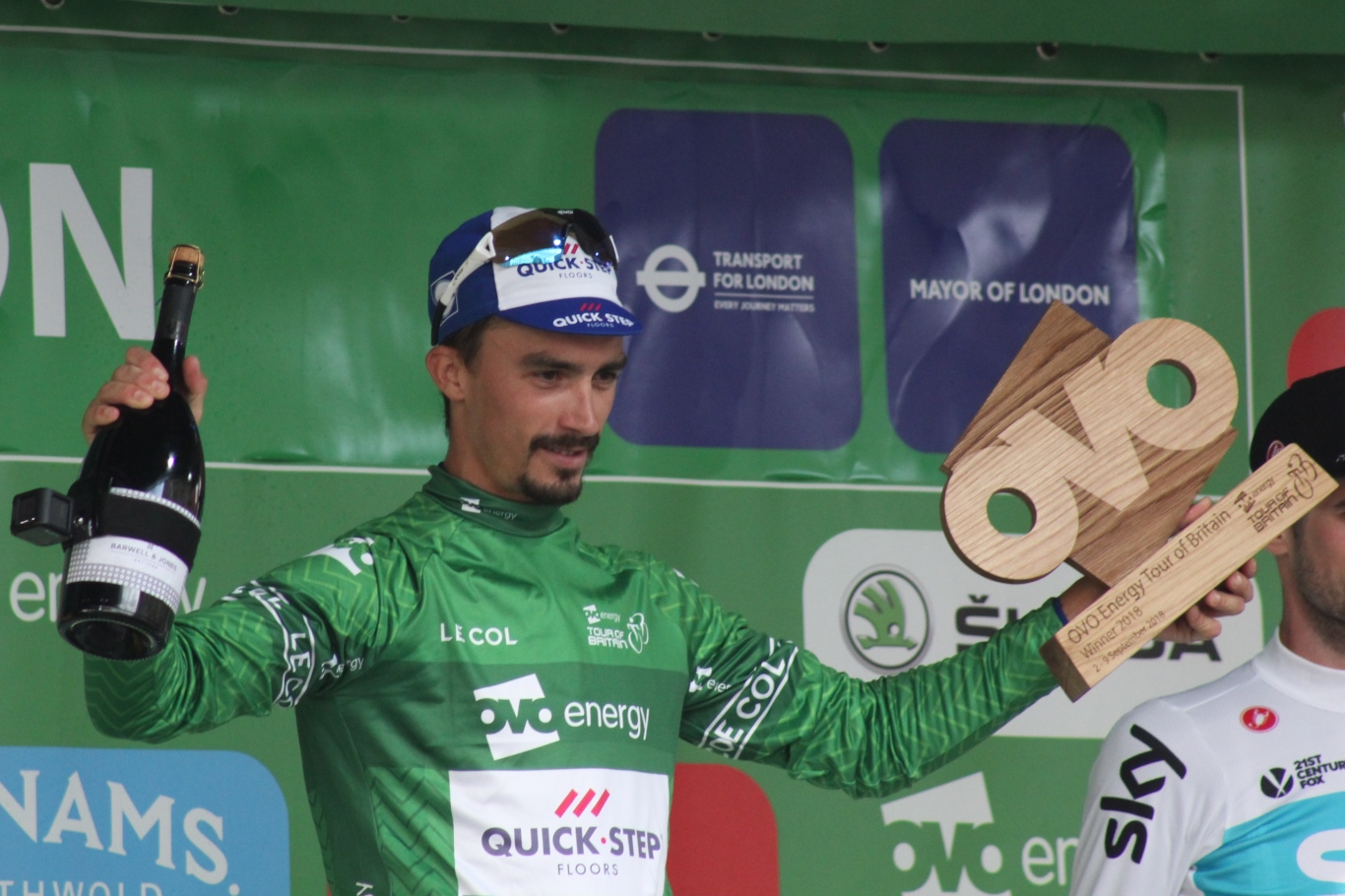
General classification - Julian Alaphilippe

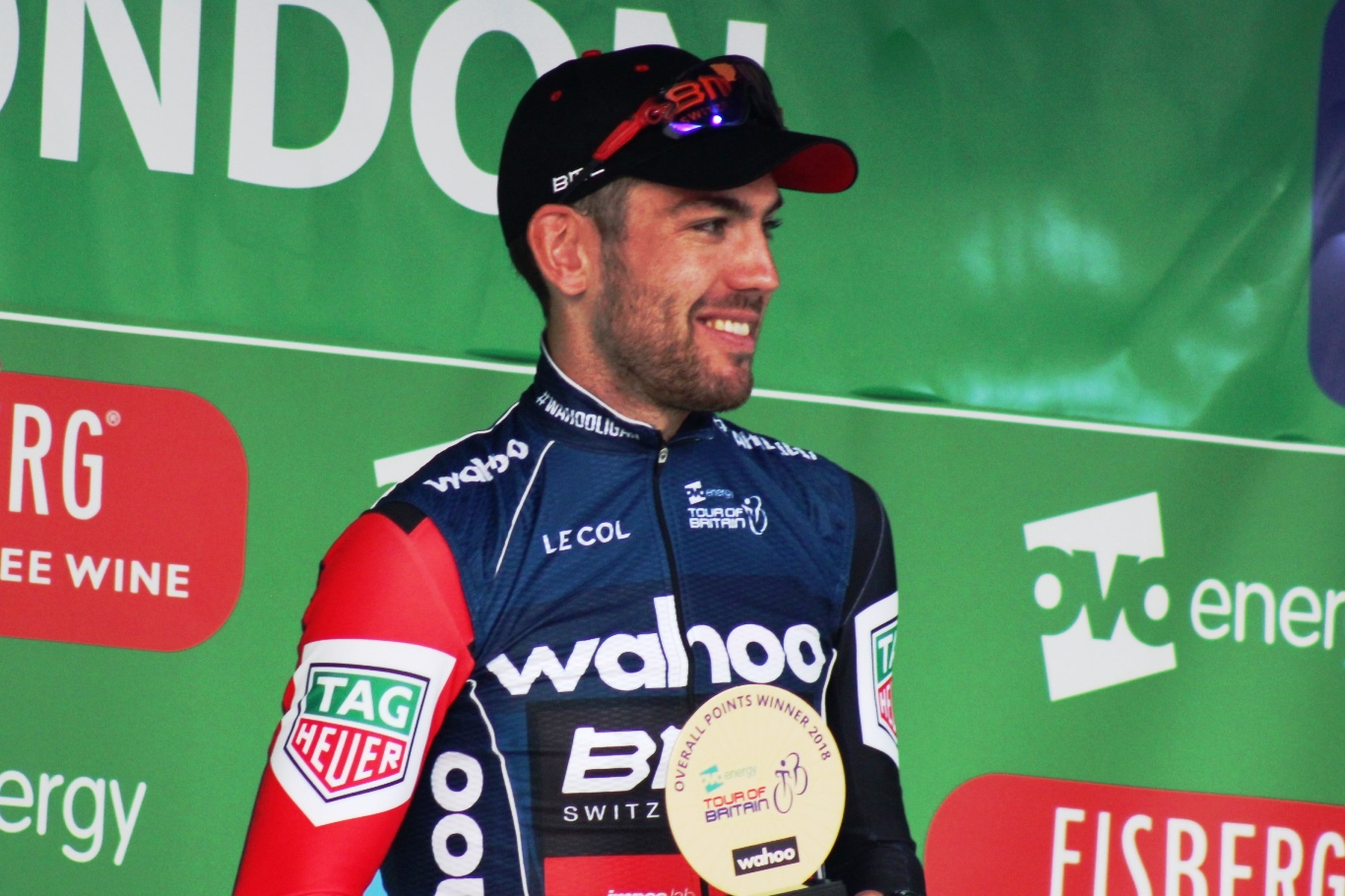
Points classification - Patrick Bevin

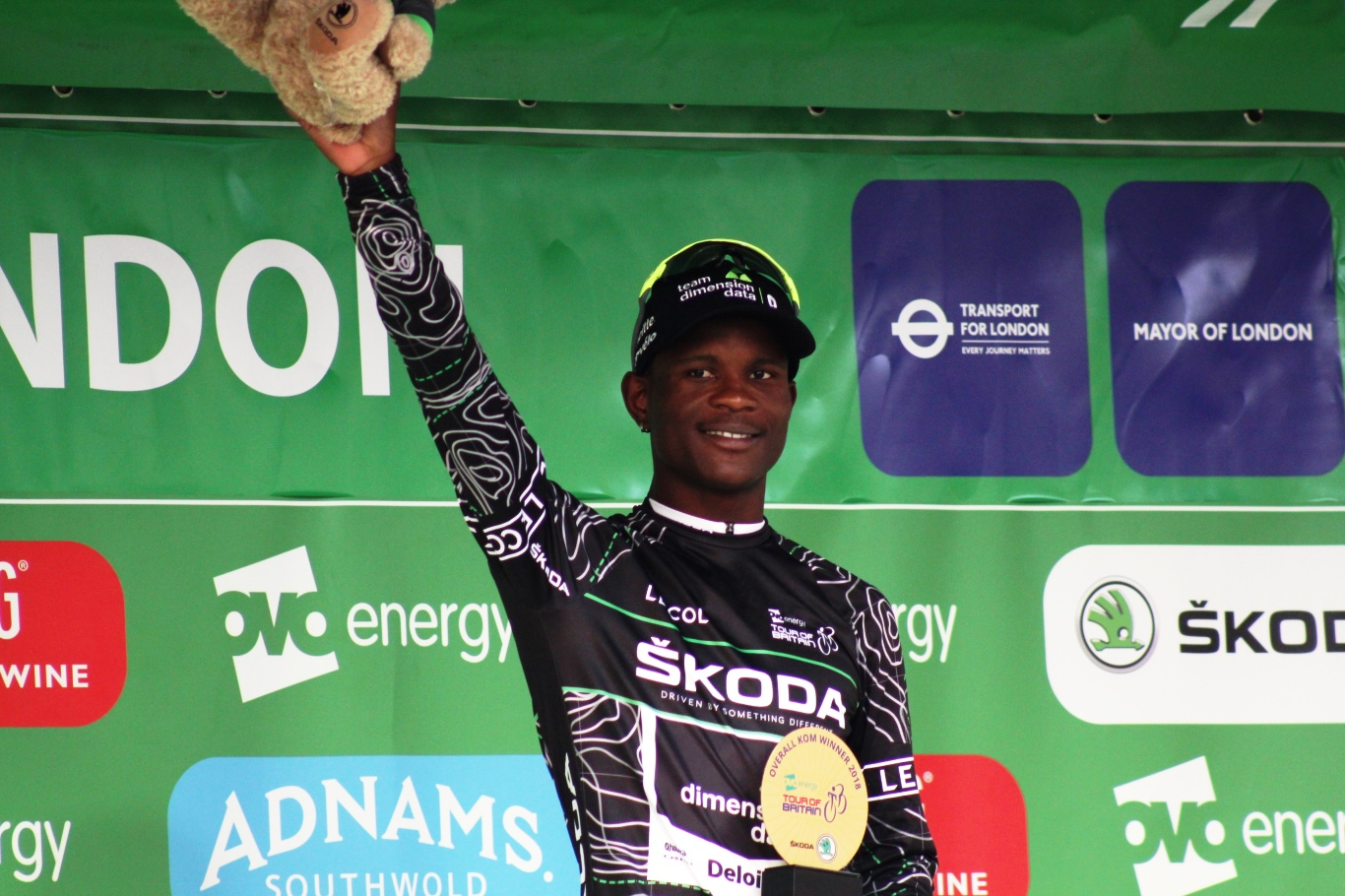
Mountains classification - Nicholas Dlamini

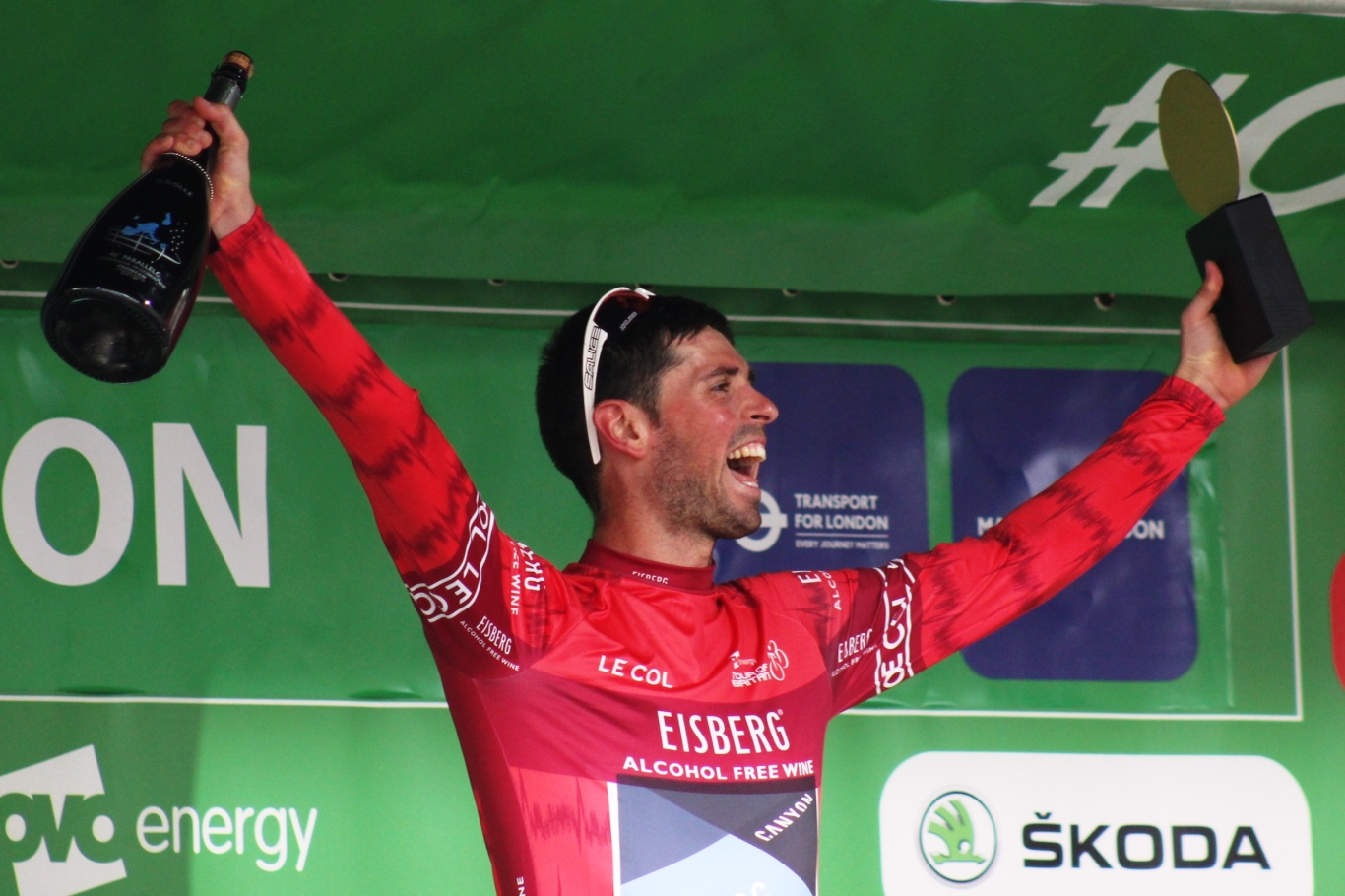
Sprints classification - Alex Paton

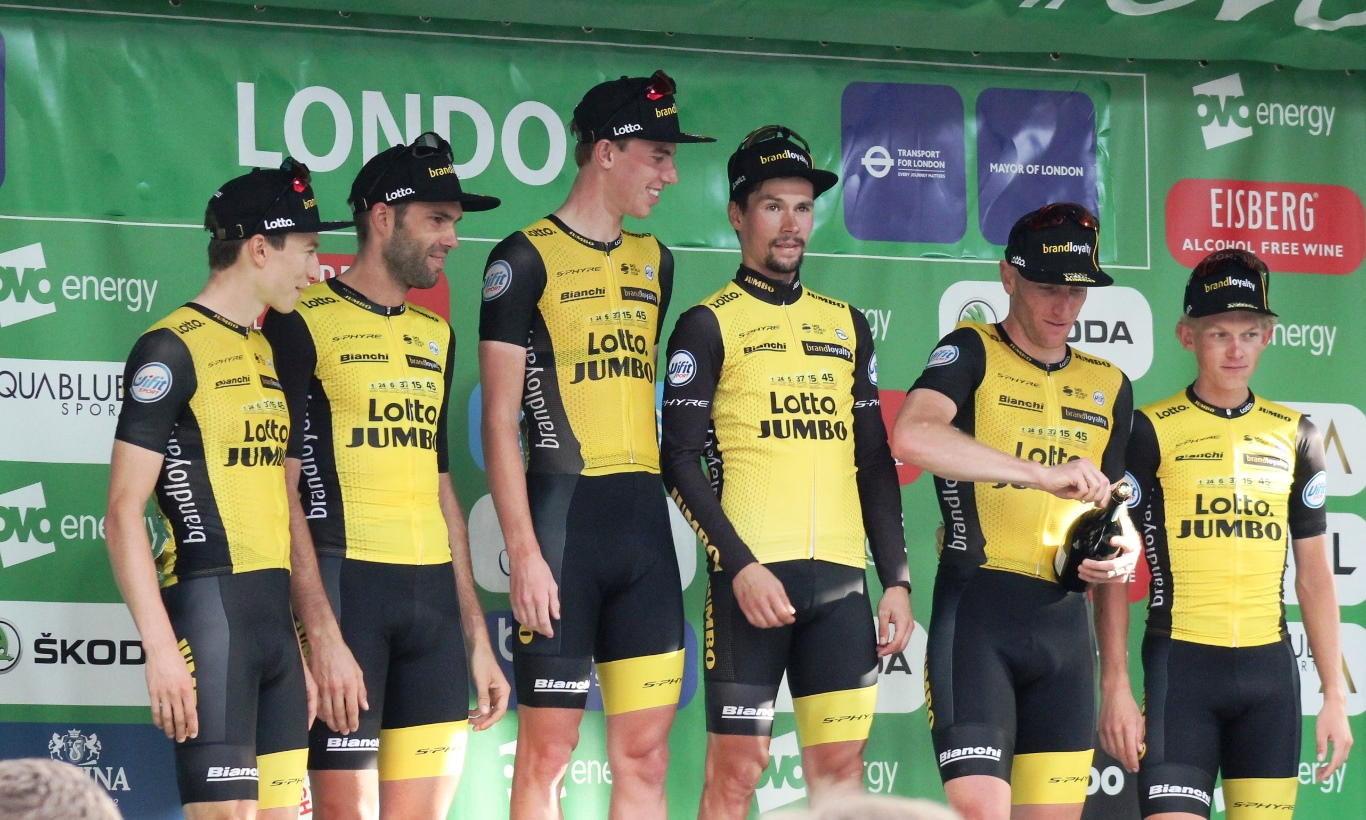
Team classification - LottoNL–Jumbo

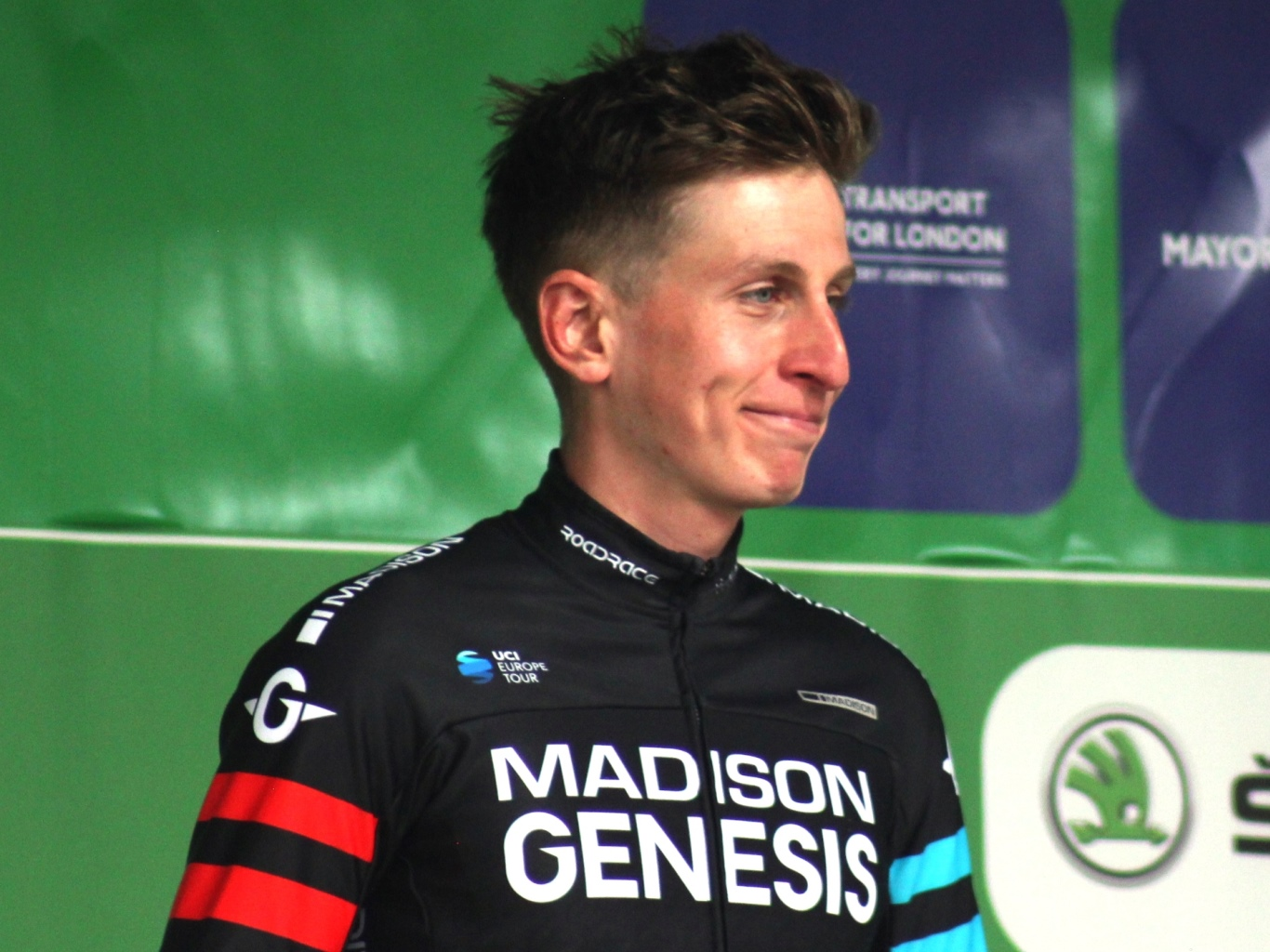
Race combativity award - Matthew Holmes
