= Premier (cycling team) =

Team information
- UCI code: PRE
- Registered: Russia
- Founded: 2006
- Disbanded: 2007
- Discipline: Road
- Status: UCI Continental

Key personnel
- General manager: Sergei Azarov
- Team manager: Vasili Fokin

Team name history
- 2006–2007: Premier

Premier was a Russian UCI Continental cycling team.

== Major wins ==
2007
Grand Prix of Moscow, Roman Klimov
Mayor Cup, Denis Galimzyanov
Overall Way to Pekin, Alexey Kunshin
