= Tour of Galicia =

Cycling race

Race details
- Date: August/September
- Region: Galicia, Spain
- Local names: Vuelta a Galicia (in Spanish); Volta a Galicia (in Galician)
- Discipline: Road
- Type: Stage race

History
- First edition: 1933
- Editions: 44 (as of 2024)
- First winner: Salvador Cardona (ESP)
- Most wins: Emilio Rodríguez (ESP) (3 wins)
- Most recent: José Luis Faura (ESP)

The Tour of Galicia (Spanish: Vuelta a Galicia; Galician: Volta a Galicia) is an annual cycling race held in Galicia, Spain. It was first held in 1933 and was held a further five times between 1934 and 1984. The tour did not take place from the outbreak of the Spanish Civil War in 1936, until the end of the Second World War in 1945. In 1986, it became a regular annual race. The final professional edition of the race was held in 2000. In 2002, after a year's hiatus, the race returned to the calendar as an amateur race.

== History ==
The first Vuelta a Galicia occurred in 1933 between August 9 and 13. Villalba's (Vilalba) local newspaper, Faro Villalbés, reported on the race. There were 33 initial competitors and eight were from the region of Galicia.

The race started in Vigo and the cyclists covered 195 kilometers to Orense, averaging about 31 kilometers per hour.

The second stage started with 29 competitors going from Orense to Lugo covering 125 kilometers and the cyclists averaged about 21 kilometers per hour.

On the third day, the competitors cycled 105 kilometers from Lugo to Ribadeo with the winner of this stage arriving in 3 hours, 18 minutes and 50 seconds.

The next stage, the fourth, the cyclist rode 153 kilometers from Ribadeo to Ferrol, averaging 28 kilometers an hour. See article for order of arrival by the first 7 cyclists.

In the fifth stage, the cyclists started in El Ferrol, traveled through Jubia (Xubia), Puentes de García Rodriguez, Cabreiros, Villalba (Vilalba), Trasparga Guitiriz, San Julian de Coirós, Betanzos, Espíritu Santo and ending in La Coruña.

On the sixth stage the cyclists rode 237 kilometers from La Coruña to Pontevedra.

In the final stage only 19 cyclists remained, riding 120 kilometers from Pontevedra to Vigo. The winner was Cardona, finishing at 41 hours, 28 minutes and 5 seconds. The winning purse was 3,000 pesetas which equates to about $320, in 1933.

== Past winners ==
Year	Country	Rider	Team
1933	Spain	Salvador Cardona	
1934	No race		
1935	Spain	Julián Berrendero	
1936–1944	No race		
1945	Spain	Delio Rodríguez	
1946	Spain	Emilio Rodríguez	
1947	Spain	Emilio Rodríguez	
1948–1954	No race		
1955	Spain	Emilio Rodríguez	
1956–1983	No race		
1984	Spain	Vicente Belda	
1985	Spain	Jesús Blanco Villar	
1986	No race		
1987	Spain	Jokin Mújika	
1988	Spain	Marino Lejarreta	
1989	Spain	Vicente Ridaura	
1990	Spain	Federico Echave	
1991	Colombia	Álvaro Mejía	
1992	Switzerland	Fabian Jeker	
1993	United States	Andrew Hampsten	
1994	Spain	Laudelino Cubino	
1995	Spain	Miguel Induráin	
1996	Spain	Abraham Olano	
1997	Spain	Aitor Garmendia	
1998	Belgium	Frank Vandenbroucke	
1999	Spain	Marcos-Antonio Serrano	
2000	Kazakhstan	Andrey Teteryuk	
2001	No race		
2002	Spain	Fernando Torres Martín	
2003	Costa Rica	José Adrián Bonilla	
2004	Spain	Luis Fernández Oliveira	
2005	Spain	Manuel Jesús Jiménez	
2006	Spain	Óscar Laguna	
2007	Spain	Óscar Laguna	
2008	Spain	Óscar García-Casarrubios	
2009	Spain	Enrique Salgueiro	
2010	Spain	Raúl García de Mateos	
2011	Spain	José Belda	
2012	Portugal	Luís Afonso	
2013	Spain	Pedro Gregori	
2014	Spain	Aitor González Prieto	
2015	Spain	Aitor González Prieto	
2016	Spain	Samuel Blanco	
2017	Spain	Martín Lestido	
2018	Spain	Sergio Vega	
2019	Spain	Martí Márquez	
2020	No race		
2021	Spain	Álex Martín	
2022	Spain	Fernando Tercero	
2023	Spain	Martín Rey	
2024	Spain	José Luis Faura	
