= Belykh =

Belykh or Belyh (Russian: Белых, from белый meaning white) is a Russian surname. It may refer to:

- Nikita Belykh, Russian politician
- Maksim Belyh (born 1984), Turkmen football player
- Sergey Belykh (born 1990), Russian cyclist
- Yuri Belykh, Russian politician, governor of Saratov Oblast (1992–1996)
