= Luis Fernández (cyclist) =

Spanish cyclist (born 1980)

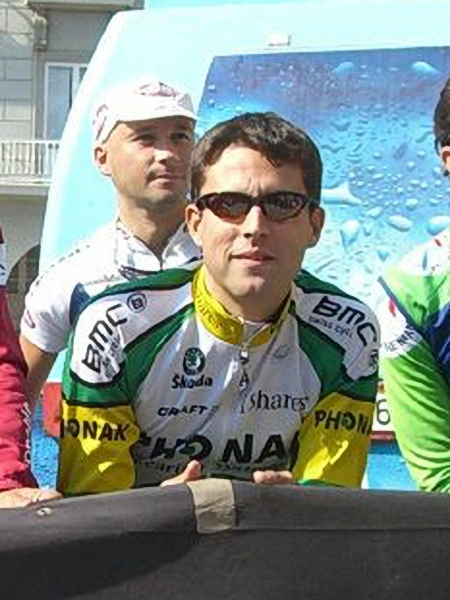
- Fernández in 2006

Personal information
- Full name: Luis Fernández Oliveira
- Born: 19 January 1980 (age 46) O Porriño, Spain

Cycling career
- Sport: Cycling
- Current team: Retired
- Discipline: Road
- Role: Rider

Professional teams
- 2006: Phonak
- 2007: Karpin–Galicia
- 2008–2009: Barbot–Siper

Luis Fernández Oliveira (born 19 January 1980) is a Spanish former road cyclist. He rode professionally from 2006 to 2009, and competed in the 2006 Vuelta a España.

== Major results ==
2004
1st Overall Tour of Galicia
1st Overall Vuelta al Goierri
1st Stage 2 Bizkaiko Bira
2005
1st Overall Volta a Coruña
