= Dmitry Strakhov =

Russian cyclist

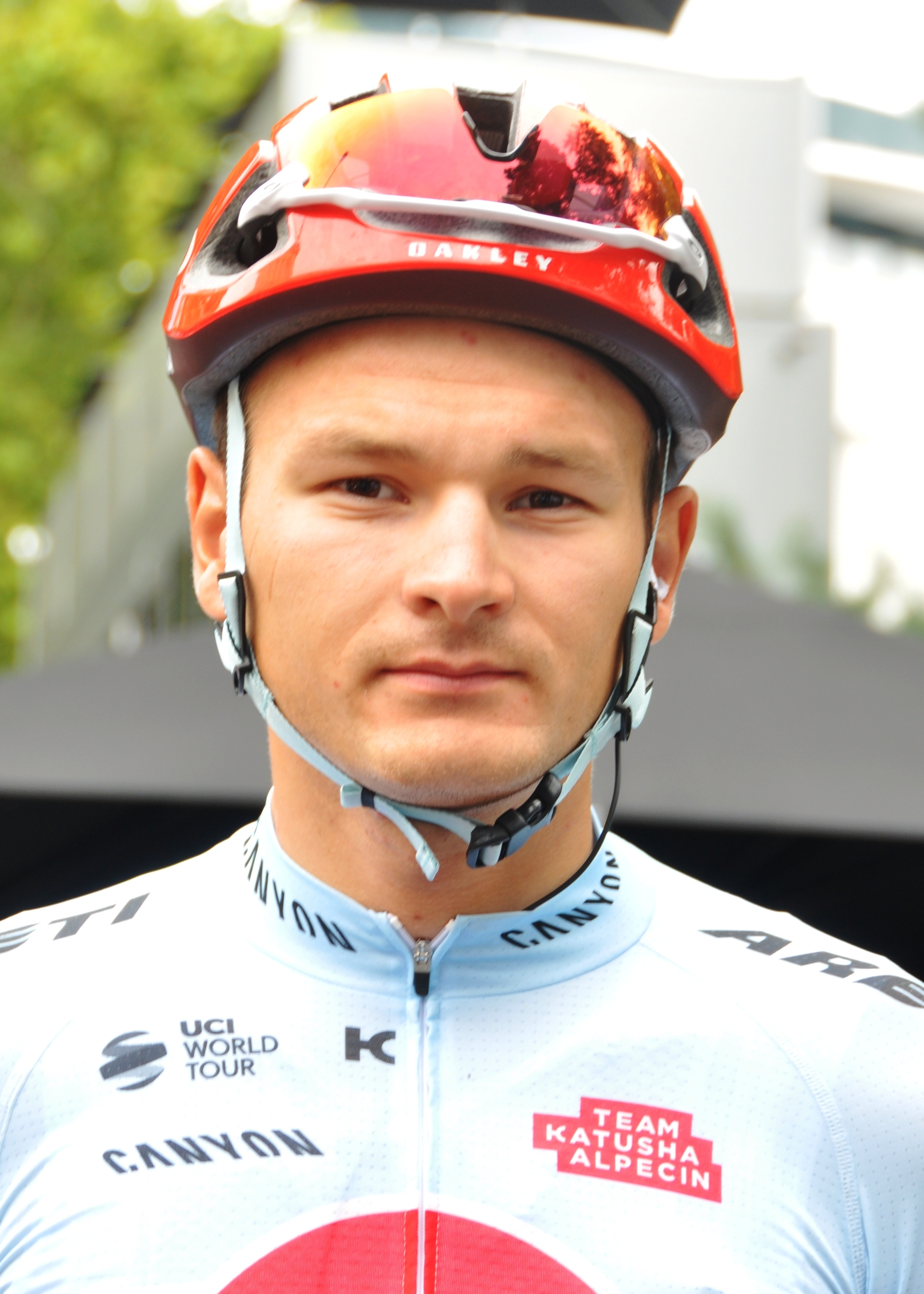
- Dmitry Strakhov in 2018.

Personal information
- Full name: Dmitry Vladimirovich Strakhov
- Born: 17 May 1995 (age 31) Vyborg, Russia
- Height: 1.85 m (6 ft 1 in)
- Weight: 70 kg (154 lb)

Cycling career
- Sport: Cycling
- Current team: Retired
- Disciplines: Road; Track
- Role: Rider

Professional teams
- 2015–2018: Lokosphinx
- 2018: Team Katusha–Alpecin (stagiaire)
- 2019: Team Katusha–Alpecin
- 2020–2022: Gazprom–RusVelo

Dmitry Vladimirovich Strakhov (Russian: Дмитрий Владимирович Страхов; born 17 May 1995) is a Russian former professional racing cyclist, who competed as a professional from 2015 to 2022. He rode in the men's point race event at the 2017 UCI Track Cycling World Championships. In May 2019, he was named in the startlist for the 2019 Giro d'Italia.

On 11 March 2020, it was reported that Strakhov had been infected by SARS-CoV-2, the virus that causes coronavirus disease 2019. He was reported to have been hospitalized in an Abu Dhabi hospital, after being placed in quarantine following the 2020 UAE Tour.

== Major results ==
2012
2nd Road race, National Junior Road Championships
8th Road race, UEC European Junior Road Championships
2013
1st Trofeo Emilio Paganessi
3rd Overall Tour of Istria
5th Trofeo comune di Vertova
2016
1st Young rider classification, Volta Internacional Cova da Beira
2017
3rd Prueba Villafranca-Ordiziako Klasika
4th Overall Vuelta Ciclista Comunidad de Madrid

1st Young rider classification

5th Time trial UEC European Under-23 Road Championships
7th Overall Volta Internacional Cova da Beira

1st Young rider classification

10th Trofeo Matteotti
2018
1st Overall GP Beiras e Serra da Estrela

1st Young rider classification
1st Stage 1

1st Clássica da Arrábida
Volta ao Alentejo

1st Points classification
1st Stages 2 & 3

1st Stage 1 Vuelta Asturias Julio Alvarez Mendo
5th Klasika Primavera
7th Overall Vuelta a Castilla y Leon
8th Overall Tour of Britain
9th Overall Arctic Race of Norway
9th Overall Vuelta Ciclista Comunidad de Madrid
10th GP Miguel Induráin
2022
1st Sprints classification, UAE Tour

=== Grand Tour general classification results timeline ===
Grand Tour	2019
Giro d'Italia	121
Tour de France	—
Vuelta a España	—
