= Dimitri Peyskens =

Belgian cyclist

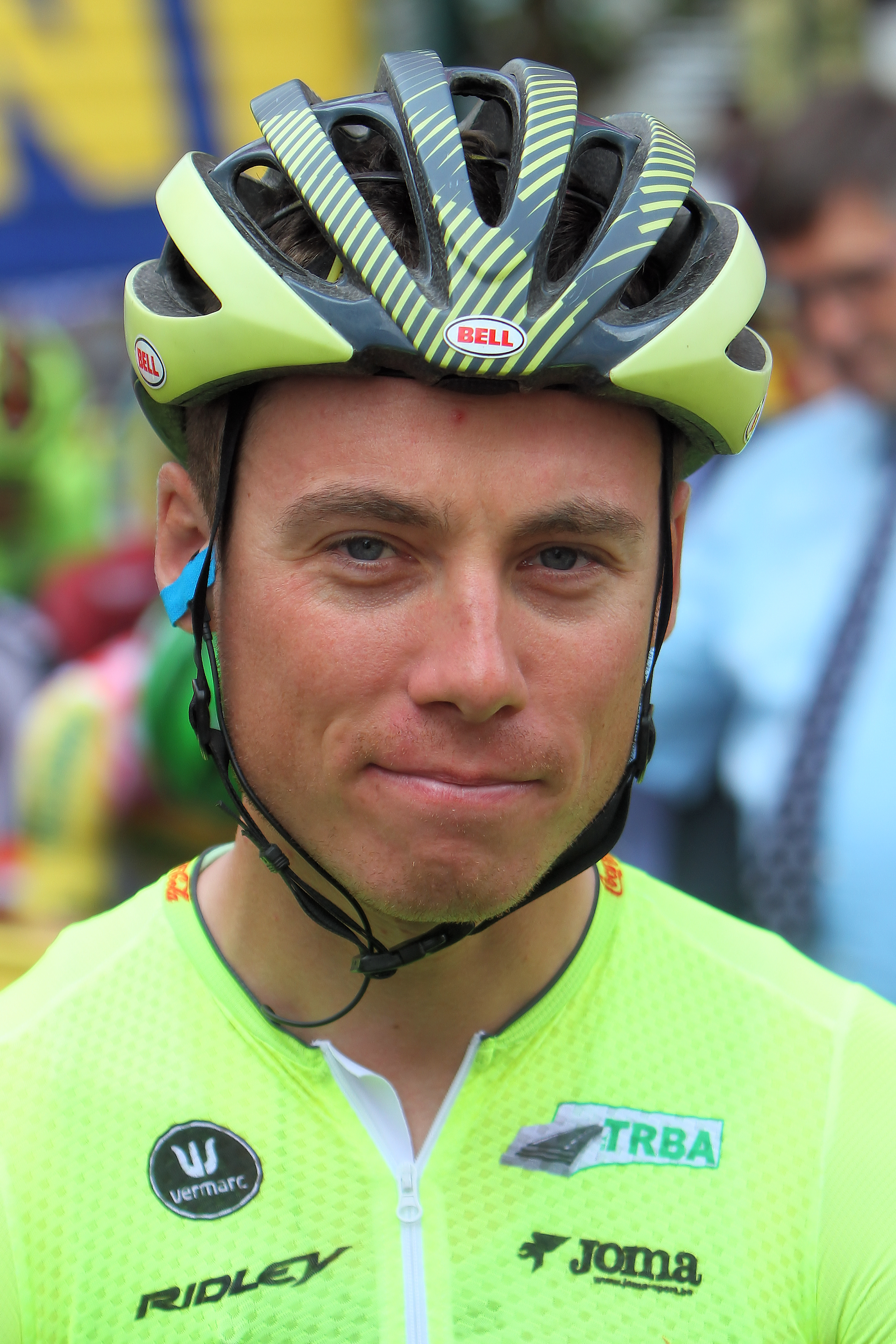
- Peyskens in 2019.

Personal information
- Full name: Dimitri Peyskens
- Born: 26 November 1991 (age 34) Uccle, Belgium
- Height: 1.82 m (6 ft 0 in)
- Weight: 70 kg (154 lb)

Cycling career
- Sport: Cycling
- Current team: Retired
- Discipline: Road
- Role: Rider

Amateur teams
- 2010: Terra Footwear–Bicycle Line
- 2011–2012: VL Technics–Abutriek
- 2013–2014: Lotto–Belisol U23

Professional teams
- 2015: Team3M
- 2016: Veranclassic–Ago
- 2017–2024: WB Veranclassic Aqua Protect

Dimitri Peyskens (born 26 November 1991) is a Belgian former professional road bicycle racer, who competed as a professional from 2015 to 2024.

== Career ==
Peyskens finished in 3rd place at the 2015 Tour de Liège, and competed in the 2017 Liège–Bastogne–Liège, but did not finish.

== Major results ==
2009
7th Overall Tour du Valromey
2012
10th Flèche Ardennaise
2015
3rd Overall Tour de Liège
6th Gooikse Pijl
8th Memorial Van Coningsloo
10th Rutland–Melton CiCLE Classic
2016
9th Internationale Wielertrofee Jong Maar Moedig
2017
2nd Grand Prix de la ville de Nogent-sur-Oise
3rd Rad am Ring
7th Volta Limburg Classic
7th Rund um Köln
8th Omloop Mandel-Leie-Schelde
8th Famenne Ardenne Classic
9th Paris–Chauny
2018
5th Overall Volta ao Alentejo
10th Druivenkoers Overijse
2019
6th Overall Circuit de la Sarthe
7th Tokyo 2020 Test Event
8th Boucles de l'Aulne
2023
8th Tour of Leuven
