= Alexey Kunshin =

Russian bicycle racer

Personal information
- Full name: Alexey Kunshin; Russian: Алексей Куньшин
- Born: 20 October 1987 (age 38)

Cycling career
- Sport: Cycling
- Current team: Retired
- Discipline: Road
- Role: Rider

Professional teams
- 2006–2007: Premier
- 2008: Katyusha
- 2012: Lokosphinx

Alexey Kunshin (Russian: Алексей Куньшин; born 20 October 1987) is a Russian former professional racing cyclist.

== Major results ==
2007
1st Overall Way to Pekin

1st Stages 1, 2 & 3

2012
1st Overall Volta ao Alentejo

1st Stage 2
