= Gabriel Cullaigh =

British cyclist (born 1996)

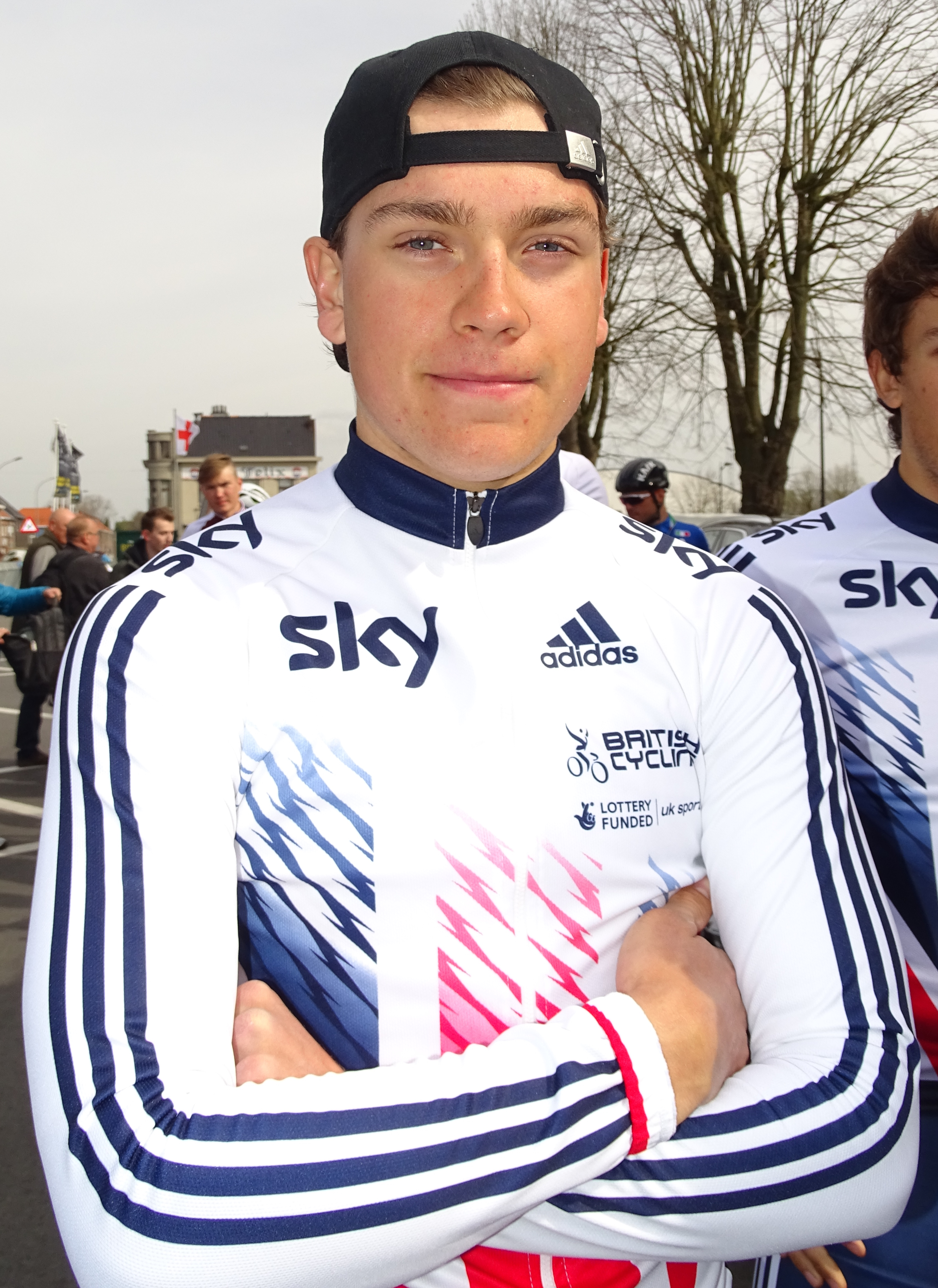
- Cullaigh in 2016.

Personal information
- Full name: Gabriel Rowan Cullaigh
- Nickname: Gabz
- Born: 8 April 1996 (age 30) Holmfirth, Great Britain
- Height: 1.79 m (5 ft 10 in)
- Weight: 78 kg (172 lb)

Cycling career
- Sport: Cycling
- Current team: Saint Piran
- Discipline: Road
- Role: Rider

Amateur teams
- ?: 5skins CAF Squad
- 2017: SEG Racing Academy

Professional teams
- 2018–2019: WIGGINS
- 2020–2021: Movistar Team
- 2022–: Saint Piran

Gabriel Rowan Cullaigh (born 8 April 1996) is a British professional racing cyclist, who currently rides for UCI Continental team Saint Piran.

== Major results ==
2012
1st Youth race, National Criterium Championships
2013
2nd Road race, National Junior Road Championships
2nd Points race, National Junior Track Championships
2014
1st Scratch, National Junior Track Championships
1st Guido Reybrouck Classic
UEC European Junior Track Championships

2nd Scratch
2nd Team pursuit
3rd Points race

3rd Madison, National Track Championships (with Mark Stewart)
2015
1st Stage 1 Peace Race U23
7th Beaumont Trophy
2016
3rd Time trial, National Under-23 Road Championships
3rd Kattekoers
5th Road race, UEC European Under-23 Road Championships
2017
8th Grand Prix de la Ville de Lillers
2018
1st Rutland–Melton CiCLE Classic
1st Redditch, Tour Series
Volta ao Alentejo

1st Stages 1 & 6

3rd Road race, National Under-23 Road Championships
3rd Gran Premio della Liberazione
9th Kattekoers
2019
1st Stage 3 Volta ao Alentejo
2nd Rutland–Melton CiCLE Classic
2021
5th Trofeo Alcúdia – Port d'Alcúdia
7th Clásica de Almería
