= Team Wiggins Le Col =

British cycling team

Team information
- UCI code: WGN
- Registered: United Kingdom
- Founded: 2014
- Disbanded: 2019
- Disciplines: Road & track
- Status: UCI Continental
- Bicycles: Pinarello
- Website: Team home page

Key personnel
- General manager: Robert Dodds; Andrew McQuaid; Bradley Wiggins
- Team manager: Simon Cope

Team name history
- 2014–2018 2019: WIGGINS; Team Wiggins Le Col
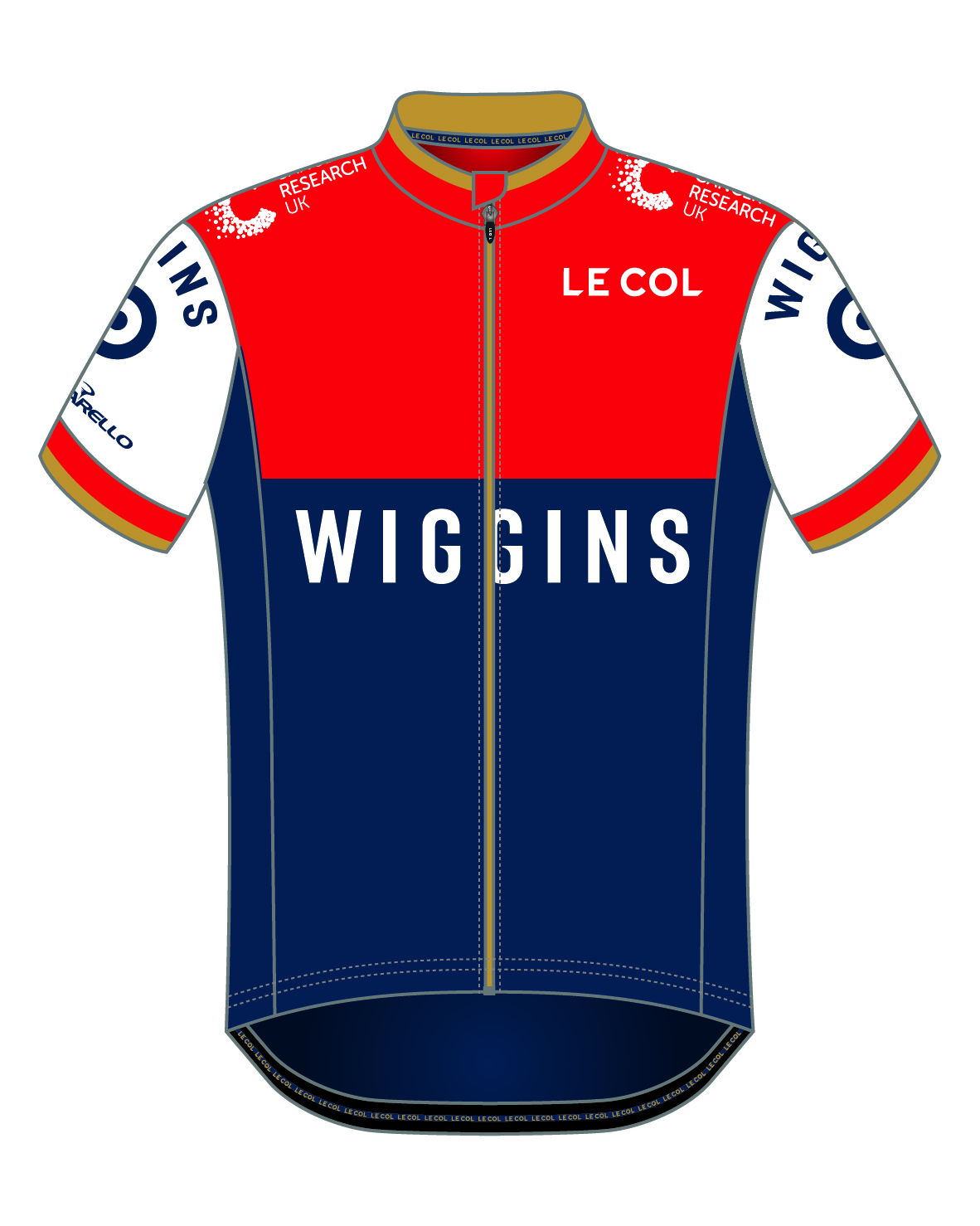
Team Wiggins Le Col jersey
Jersey

Team Wiggins Le Col (UCI team code: WGN), also known as Team Wiggins in media, was a professional developmental cycling team based in the United Kingdom, which began competing in elite road bicycle racing and track cycling in 2015. The team folded at the end of the 2019 season after completing the Tour of Britain.

== Team history ==
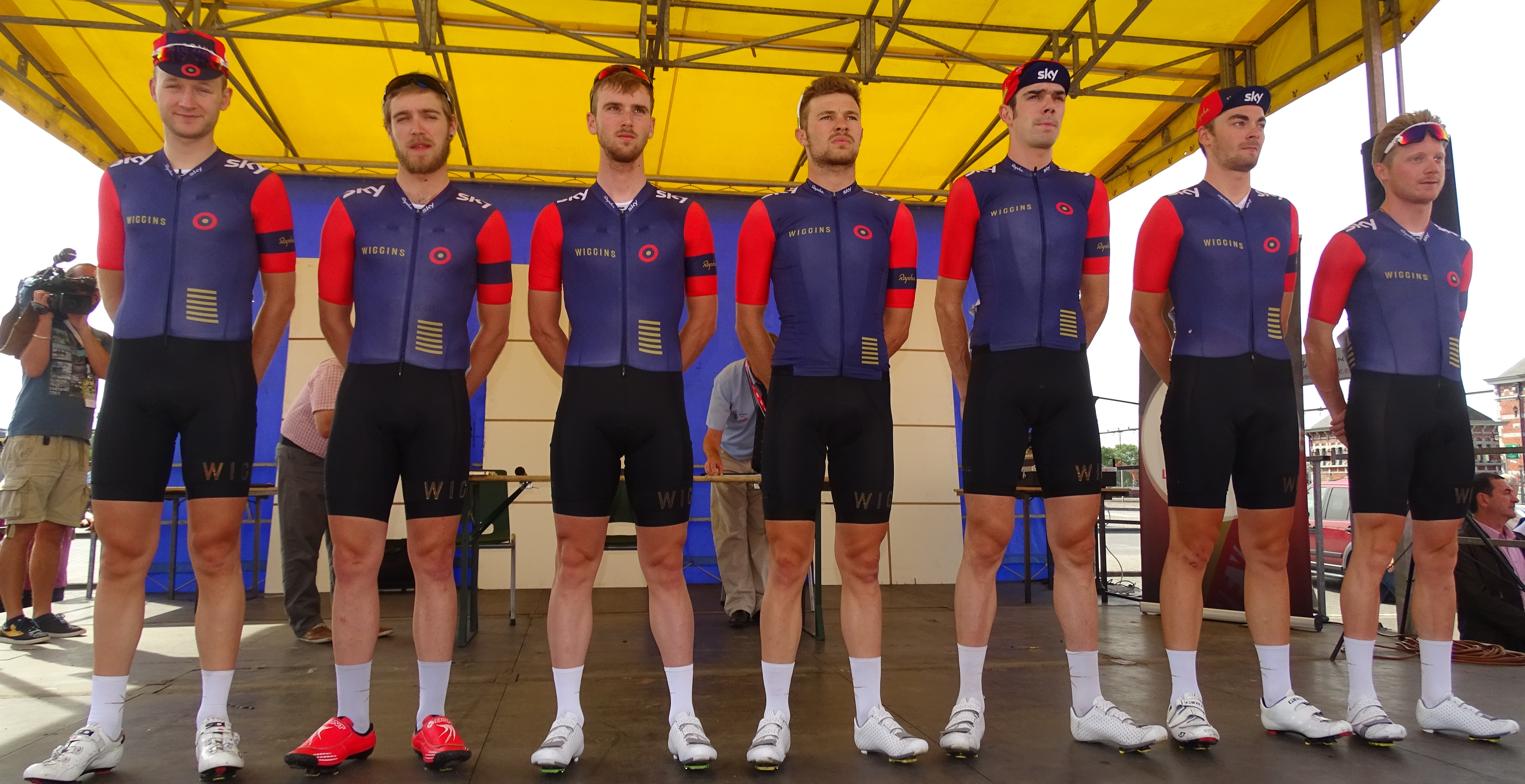
The WIGGINS team at the 2015 Grand Prix Pino Cerami

The team was founded by Bradley Wiggins, after much speculation in the latter part of the 2014 road season, in order to better facilitate his return to the track as part of his preparations for the 2016 Olympic Games.

The team has a reported budget of £460,000 which is comparable to JLT–Condor and Madison-Genesis. According to Cycling Weekly the team's management comprises Robert Dodds (president of XIX Entertainment, and Wiggins's manager), Andrew McQuaid (rider agent and director of Trinity Sports Management) and Wiggins himself. The team appointed former Wiggle–Honda DS Simon Cope as its first directeur sportif .

For the team's inaugural season the team began with eight full-time riders, with Wiggins joining on 1 May 2015. Those eight were Steven Burke, Mark Christian, Jonathan Dibben, Owain Doull, Daniel Patten, Iain Paton, Andy Tennant and Michael Thompson. These eight riders are supplemented by riders from the British Academy on a race to race basis. On 5 January 2015 the team was officially awarded its UCI Continental licence.

In March 2015, Bradley Wiggins confirmed that he would make his debut with the team at the inaugural Tour de Yorkshire at the start of May. In 2016, he entered the Tour De Yorkshire with his team and dropped out in the first stage. WIGGINS was not invited to the 2017 Tour de Yorkshire. In 2018 following the collapse of Team Aqua Blue Sport, Team Wiggins participated at short notice in the 2018 Tour of Britain. Tom Pidcock was the team's highest placed rider in the race at 17th in the General Classification.

In November 2018 the team filed paperwork with Companies House which indicated that XIX Entertainment no longer held a 40 per cent stake in the team, and that this share had been transferred to Wiggins' firm, Wiggins Right Limited.

In August 2019, Wiggins announced that the team would be closing down at the end of the year.

== Sponsorship ==
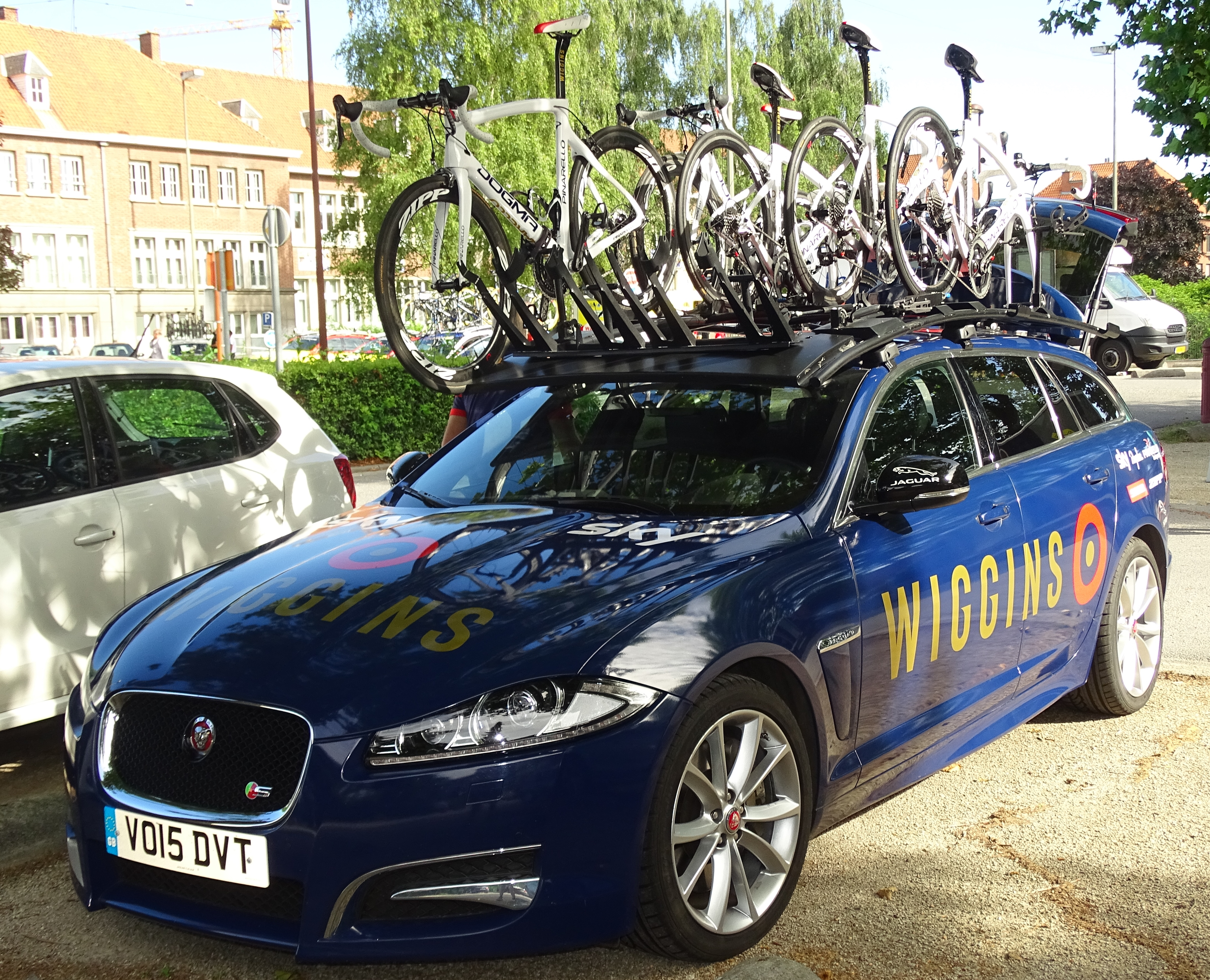
One of Team WIGGINS' Jaguar XF support cars

Sky was the team's original sponsor. The team's kit was initially produced by Rapha. but as of 2018 the team switched to use Le Col as their clothing supplier. In December 2018 Wiggins announced that Le Col would step up to becoming the team's co-title sponsor for 2019, with the team being known as Team Wiggins Le Col. The team used Pinarello bikes equipped with Zipp, Fizik, Elite and SRAM components.

== Final roster ==
As of 30 September 2019.

Rider	Date of birth
Lawrence Carpenter (GBR)	2 August 1993 (aged 26)
Mark Christian (GBR)	20 November 1990 (aged 28)
Gabriel Cullaigh (GBR)	8 April 1996 (aged 23)
Mark Donovan (GBR)	3 April 1999 (aged 20)
James Fouché (NZL)	28 March 1998 (aged 21)
Ben Healy (IRL)	11 September 2000 (aged 19)
Samuel Jenner (AUS)	2 April 1997 (aged 22)
Corentin Navarro (FRA)	29 November 1997 (aged 21)

Rider	Date of birth
Michael O'Loughlin (IRL)	14 February 1997 (aged 22)
Tom Pidcock (GBR)	30 July 1999 (aged 20)
Callum Riley (GBR)	22 September 1994 (aged 25)
Oliver Robinson (GBR)	30 March 1999 (aged 20)
Jacques Sauvagnargues (GBR)	24 September 1999 (aged 20)
Robert Scott (GBR)	24 July 1998 (aged 21)
Daniel Tullett (GBR)	3 July 1999 (aged 20)

== Major wins ==
2015
Wiltshire GP, Andy Tennant
Stage 2 Flèche du Sud, Andy Tennant
Stages 3 & 4 Flèche du Sud, Owain Doull
Round 6 – Barrow Tour Series, Christopher Lawless
Points classification Tour of Britain, Owain Doull
2016
Stage 3a (ITT) Le Triptyque des Monts et Châteaux, Jonathan Dibben
Stage 4 Ronde de l'Isard, Scott Davies
Stage 5 Olympia's Tour, Christopher Latham
2017
Klondike Grand Prix, Christopher Latham
2018
Volta ao Alentejo

Stages 1 & 6, Gabriel Cullaigh
Youth Classification, Mark Downey

Rutland–Melton International CiCLE Classic, Gabriel Cullaigh
Stage 2 Giro della Valle d'Aosta, Mark Donovan
Mountains classification Le Triptyque des Monts et Chateaux, James Fouché
2019
Tour of Antalya

Mountain classification, James Fouché
Intermediate sprints classification, James Fouché

Volta ao Alentejo

Stage 3, Gabriel Cullaigh
Mountains classification, James Fouché

Triptyque des Monts et Châteaux

Points classification, Thomas Pidcock
Stage 2b, Thomas Pidcock

Paris–Roubaix Espoirs, Thomas Pidcock
Overall Tour Alsace, Thomas Pidcock

Young rider classification, Thomas Pidcock
Stage 2, Thomas Pidcock

== National, continental and world champions ==
2015
British U23 Road Race, Owain Doull
British Track (Individual pursuit), Andy Tennant
UEC European Track (Team pursuit) Bradley Wiggins
2016
World Track (Points race), Jonathan Dibben
World Track (Madison), Bradley Wiggins
British U23 Time Trial, Scott Davies
Olympic Games (Team pursuit), Steven Burke, Owain Doull & Bradley Wiggins
Olympic Games (Team Sprint), Philip Hindes
2017
British U23 Time Trial, Scott Davies
2018
British U23 Road Race, Robert Scott
New Zealand U23 Road Race, James Fouché
Irish U23 Time Trial, Michael O'Loughlin
2019
New Zealand Road Race, James Fouché
New Zealand U23 Road Race, James Fouché
New Zealand U23 Time Trial, James Fouché
Irish U23 Time Trial, Michael O'Loughlin

== See also ==
- Netcompany–Ineos
