= Luís Mendonça =

Portuguese cyclist

Personal information
- Full name: Luís Carlos Ribeiro Nunes Mendonça
- Born: 16 January 1986 (age 40)

Cycling career
- Sport: Cycling
- Current team: Anicolor / Campicarn
- Discipline: Road
- Role: Rider

Professional teams
- 2016: Funvic Soul Cycles–Carrefour (stagiaire)
- 2017–2018: Louletano–Hospital de Loulé
- 2019: Rádio Popular–Boavista
- 2020–: Efapel

Luís Carlos Ribeiro Nunes Mendonça (born 16 January 1986) is a Portuguese cyclist, who currently rides for UCI Continental team Anicolor / Campicarn.

== Major results ==
2018
1st Overall Volta ao Alentejo
2019
2nd Overall Volta ao Alentejo

1st Points classification

2020
3rd Overall Troféu Joaquim Agostinho

1st Stage 1

2022
3rd Clássica da Arrábida
