= Sergey Belykh =

Russian cyclist

Personal information
- Full name: Sergey Belykh; Russian: Сергей Белых
- Born: 4 March 1990 (age 36)

Cycling career
- Sport: Cycling
- Discipline: Road
- Role: Rider

Amateur teams
- 2011: Lokomotiv
- 2016: Lokosphinx Amateur
- 2017–2019: Udmurtia Region

Professional teams
- 2010: Katyusha Continental Team
- 2012–2013: Lokosphinx
- 2014: Team 21
- 2015: Itera–Katusha
- 2016: Lokosphinx

Sergey Belykh (born 4 March 1990) is a Russian cyclist, who last rode for Russian amateur team Udmurtia Region.

== Major results ==
2010
10th Overall Grand Prix of Adygeya
2011
5th Overall Ronde de l'Isard
2012
1st Stage 2 Troféu Joaquim Agostinho
3rd Overall Vuelta Ciclista a León

1st Young rider classification

2014
1st Overall Tour de Constantine

1st Points classification

1st Mountains classification Course de la Solidarité Olympique
2nd Overall Tour International de Sétif

1st Stage 3

2nd Overall Tour of Kavkaz
7th Overall Grand Prix of Adygeya
2015
2nd Grand Prix Sarajevo
4th Grand Prix of Sochi Mayor
5th Overall Tour of Bulgaria
8th Overall Grand Prix of Adygeya
8th Giro del Medio Brenta
