= Way to Pekin =

Defunct cycling race

Race details
- Date: May
- Region: Moscow
- Discipline: Road
- Competition: UCI Europe Tour
- Type: Stage race

History
- First edition: 2006
- Editions: 3
- Final edition: 2008
- First winner: Alexander Erofeev (RUS)
- Most wins: No repeat winners
- Final winner: Sergey Firsanov (RUS)

The Way to Pekin was a Multi-day cycling race that was held in Russia from 2006-2008. It was part of UCI Europe Tour in 2006 and 2007 and UCI Asia Tour in 2008. It was rated as a 2.2 event. It was organized in preparation for the 2008 Summer Olympics in Beijing.

== Winners ==
Year	Country	Rider	Team
2006	Russia	Alexander Erofeev	
2007	Russia	Alexey Kunshin	Premier
2008	Russia	Sergey Firsanov	Rietumu Bank-Riga
