= Álvaro Robredo =

Spanish cyclist

Personal information
- Full name: Álvaro Robredo Crespo
- Born: 3 April 1993 (age 33) Ezcaray, Spain

Cycling career
- Sport: Cycling
- Current team: Retired
- Discipline: Road
- Role: Rider

Amateur team
- 2013: Ikolan Lanaldi–Ordiziako

Professional team
- 2014–2019: Burgos BH

Álvaro Robredo Crespo (born 3 April 1993, in Ezcaray) is a Spanish former professional cyclist, who competed professionally for the Burgos BH team between 2014 and 2019.
