= Lokosphinx =

Russian cycling team

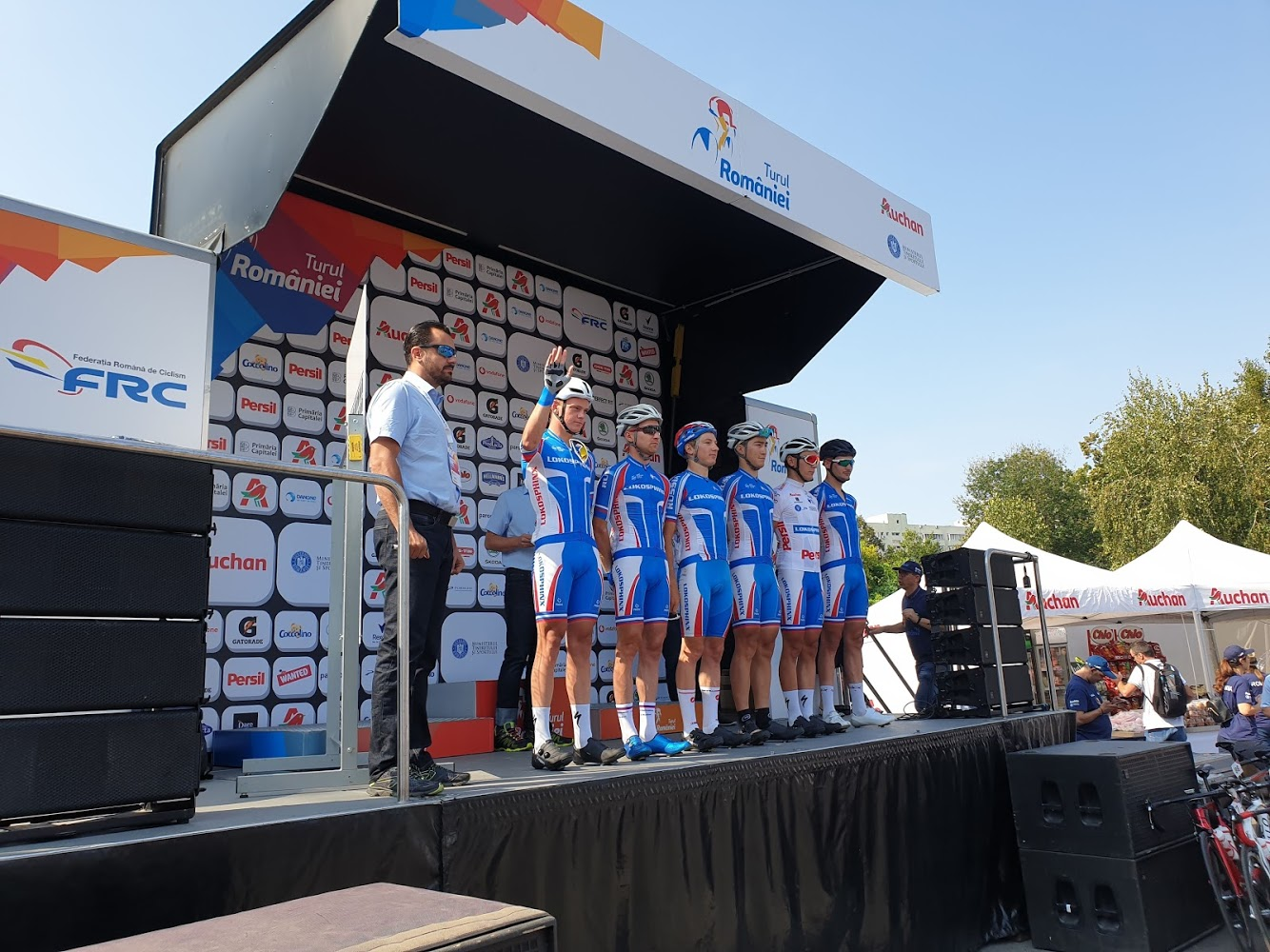

Team information
- UCI code: LOK
- Registered: Russia
- Founded: 2012
- Discipline: Road
- Status: UCI Continental

Key personnel
- General manager: Alexander Kuznetsov
- Team manager: Denis Smyslov

Team name history
- 2012–: Lokosphinx

Lokosphinx is a Russian UCI Continental cycling team established in 2012.

== Team roster ==
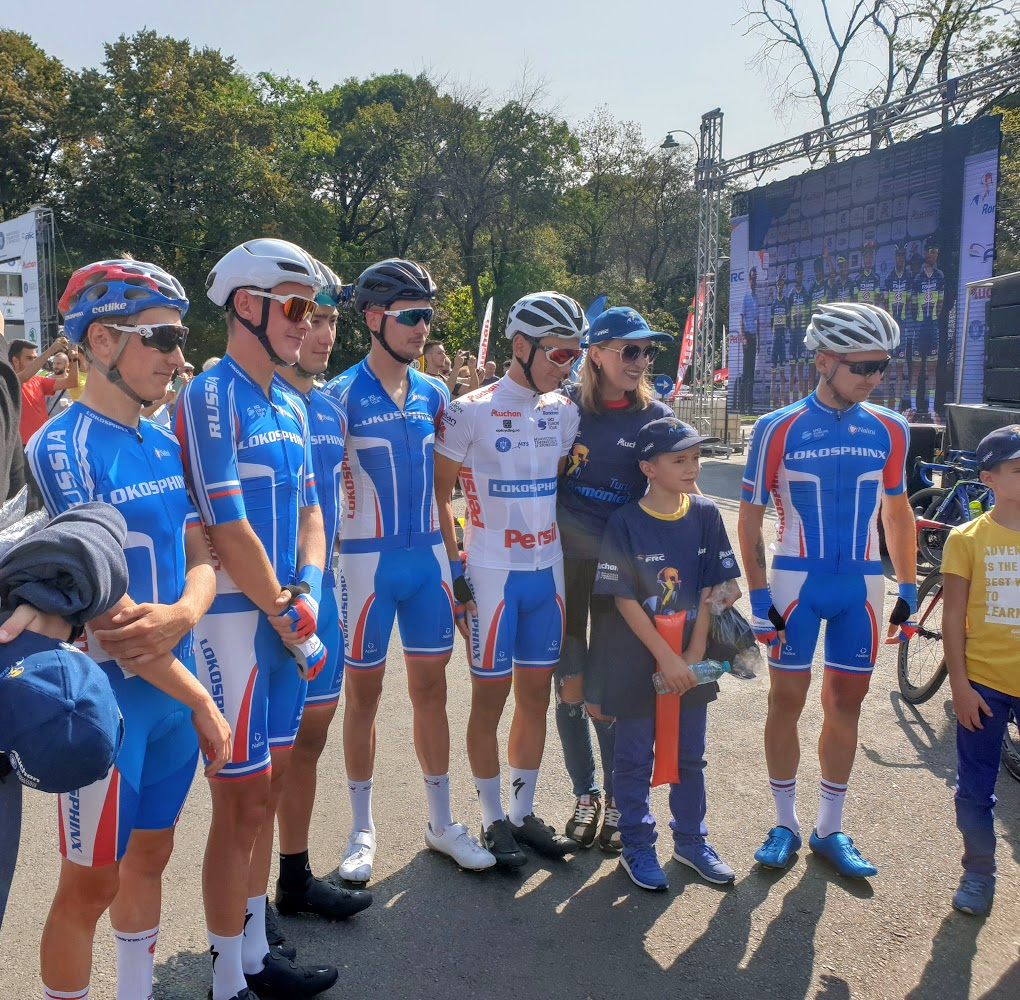
Lokosphinx before the start of the last stage of the 2019 Tour of Romania

As of 17 February 2021.

Rider	Date of birth
Nikita Bersenev (RUS)	25 March 2000 (age 26)
Lev Gonov (RUS)	6 January 2000 (age 26)
Sergey Malnev (RUS)	8 August 1998 (age 28)
Dmitry Mukhomediarov (RUS)	24 May 1999 (age 27)
Arseny Nikiforov (RUS)	29 January 1998 (age 28)
Vyacheslav Polozov (RUS)	9 August 2001 (age 25)

Rider	Date of birth
Alexandr Smirnov (RUS)	10 February 1998 (age 28)
Ivan Smirnov (RUS)	14 January 1999 (age 27)
Dmitri Sokolov (RUS)	19 March 1988 (age 38)
Kirill Sveshnikov (RUS)	10 February 1992 (age 34)
Gleb Syritsa (RUS)	14 April 2000 (age 26)
Alexander Vdovin (RUS)	21 August 1993 (age 33)

== Major wins ==
2012
Overall Volta ao Alentejo, Alexey Kunshin

Stage 2, Alexey Kunshin
Stage 3, Sergey Shilov

Vuelta a La Rioja, Evgeny Shalunov
Stage 2 Troféu Joaquim Agostinho, Sergey Belykh
Stage 2 Vuelta Ciclista a León, Sergey Belykh
2013
Stage 3 Vuelta Ciclista a León, Sergey Shilov
2014
Gran Premio della Liberazione, Evgeny Shalunov
Stage 2 Troféu Joaquim Agostinho, Kirill Sveshnikov
Stage 8 Volta a Portugal, Sergey Shilov
2015
Stage 2 Vuelta a Castilla y León, Sergey Shilov
Overall Vuelta a la Comunidad de Madrid, Evgeny Shalunov

Stage 1, Evgeny Shalunov

Prologue Troféu Joaquim Agostinho, Sergey Shilov
Trofeo Matteotti, Evgeny Shalunov
2017
Stage 1 Vuelta a Castilla y León, Alexander Evtushenko
Stage 4 Flèche du Sud, Mamyr Stash
Stage 1 GP Beiras e Serra da Estrela, Alexander Evtushenko
Trofeo Matteotti, Sergey Shilov
Prueba Villafranca de Ordizia, Sergey Shilov
2018
Clássica da Arrábida, Dmitry Strakhov
Stages 2 & 3 Volta ao Alentejo, Dmitry Strakhov
Overall GP Beiras e Serra da Estrela, Dmitry Strakhov

Stage 1, Dmitry Strakhov

Stage 1 Vuelta a Asturias, Dmitry Strakhov
2019
Stage 4 Tour of Romania, Savva Novikov
Overall Tour of Azerbaijan (Iran), Savva Novikov

Stage 1, Aleksandr Smirnov
Stage 3, Savva Novikov
