= Aitor González (cyclist, born 1990) =

Spanish cyclist

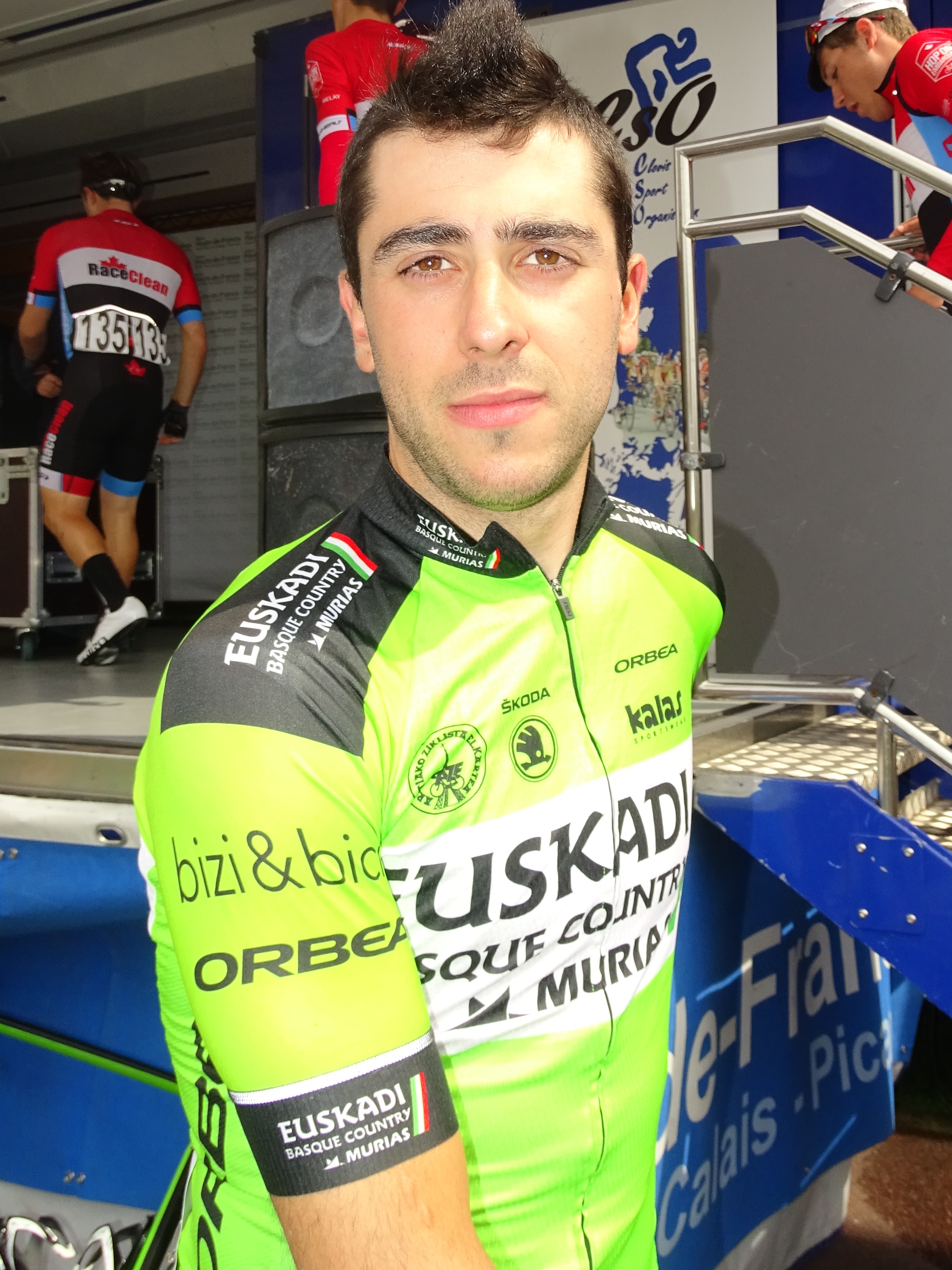
- González in 2016

Personal information
- Full name: Aitor González Prieto

Cycling career
- Sport: Cycling
- Discipline: Road
- Role: Rider

Amateur teams
- 2010–2012: Debabarrena
- 2013–2014: Lizarte
- 2015: Ampo–Goierriko TB

Professional team
- 2016–2018: Euskadi Basque Country–Murias

Aitor González Prieto (born 5 November 1990 in Ermua) is a Spanish cyclist, who last rode for UCI Professional Continental team Euskadi–Murias.
