= List of teams and cyclists in the 2018 Vuelta a España =

List of cyclists

The 2018 Vuelta a España was the 73rd edition of the race. It was the last of cycling's three Grand Tours to take place during the 2018 road cycling season. The race started in Málaga on 25 August and finished in Madrid on 16 September. All 18 UCI World Tour teams were automatically entitled to start the race.

== Teams ==
UCI WorldTeams

- AG2R La Mondiale
- Astana
- Bahrain–Merida
- BMC Racing Team
- Bora–Hansgrohe
- Team Dimension Data
- EF Education First–Drapac p/b Cannondale
- Team Katusha–Alpecin
- Lotto–Soudal
- LottoNL–Jumbo
- Mitchelton–Scott
- Movistar Team
- Quick-Step Floors
- Team Sky
- Team Sunweb
- Trek–Segafredo
- UAE Team Emirates
- Groupama–FDJ

Professional Continental teams

- Burgos BH
- Caja Rural–Seguros RGA
- Cofidis
- Euskadi–Murias

== Cyclists ==
Legend
No.	Starting number worn by the rider during the Vuelta
Pos.	Position in the general classification
Time	Deficit to the winner of the general classification
†	Denotes riders born on or after 1 January 1993 eligible for the young rider award
General classification	Denotes the winner of the general classification
Points classification	Denotes the winner of the points classification
Mountains classification	Denotes the winner of the mountains classification
Combination classification	Denotes the winner of the combination classification
Combativity award	Denotes the winner of the Combativity award
Young rider award	Denotes the winner of the Young rider award
DNS	Denotes a rider who did not start, followed by the stage before which he withdrew
DNF	Denotes a rider who did not finish, followed by the stage in which he withdrew
DSQ	Denotes a rider who was disqualified from the race, followed by the stage in which this occurred
Age correct as of 26 August 2018, the date on which the Vuelta begins

=== By starting number ===
No.	Name	Nationality	Team	Age	Pos.	Time	Ref.
1	Vincenzo Nibali	Italy	Bahrain–Merida	33	59	+ 2h 08' 54"	
2	Iván García †	Spain	Bahrain–Merida	22	99	+ 3h 28' 51"	
3	Gorka Izagirre	Spain	Bahrain–Merida	30	29	+ 1h 14' 48"	
4	Ion Izagirre	Spain	Bahrain–Merida	29	9	+ 11' 09"	
5	Mark Padun †	Ukraine	Bahrain–Merida	22	DNF-17	–	
6	Franco Pellizotti	Italy	Bahrain–Merida	40	50	+ 1h 58' 18"	
7	Hermann Pernsteiner	Austria	Bahrain–Merida	28	DNS-18	–	
8	Luka Pibernik †	Slovenia	Bahrain–Merida	24	142	+ 4h 56' 19"	
11	Hubert Dupont	France	AG2R La Mondiale	38	26	+ 1h 11' 04"	
12	Mikaël Cherel	France	AG2R La Mondiale	32	97	+ 3h 21' 54"	
13	Julien Duval	France	AG2R La Mondiale	28	157	+ 5h 42' 01"	
14	Tony Gallopin	France	AG2R La Mondiale	30	11	+ 12' 10"	
15	Ben Gastauer	Luxembourg	AG2R La Mondiale	30	36	+ 1h 28' 52"	
16	Alexandre Geniez	France	AG2R La Mondiale	30	90	+ 3h 04' 42"	
17	Alexis Gougeard †	France	AG2R La Mondiale	25	DNF-11	–	
18	Nans Peters †	France	AG2R La Mondiale	24	72	+ 2h 30' 11"	
21	Miguel Ángel López †	Colombia	Astana	24	3	+ 2' 04"	
22	Pello Bilbao	Spain	Astana	28	27	+ 1h 12' 49"	
23	Dario Cataldo	Italy	Astana	33	64	+ 2h 18' 54"	
24	Omar Fraile	Spain	Astana	28	63	+ 2h 14' 33"	
25	Jan Hirt	Czechia	Astana	27	74	+ 2h 35' 49"	
26	Nikita Stalnov	Kazakhstan	Astana	26	104	+ 3h 46' 29"	
27	Davide Villella	Italy	Astana	27	48	+ 1h 57' 26"	
28	Andrey Zeits	Kazakhstan	Astana	31	52	+ 2h 01' 13"	
31	Richie Porte	Australia	BMC Racing Team	33	84	+ 2h 57' 17"	
32	Brent Bookwalter	United States	BMC Racing Team	34	66	+ 2h 21' 43"	
33	Alessandro De Marchi	Italy	BMC Racing Team	32	76	+ 2h 40' 14"	
34	Rohan Dennis	Australia	BMC Racing Team	28	DNS-17	–	
35	Nicolas Roche	Ireland	BMC Racing Team	34	40	+ 1h 36' 40"	
36	Joey Rosskopf	United States	BMC Racing Team	28	81	+ 2h 51' 48"	
37	Dylan Teuns	Belgium	BMC Racing Team	26	33	+ 1h 22' 46"	
38	Francisco Ventoso	Spain	BMC Racing Team	36	111	+ 4h 02' 14"	
41	Peter Sagan	Slovakia	Bora–Hansgrohe	28	119	+ 4h 16' 05"	
42	Emanuel Buchmann	Germany	Bora–Hansgrohe	25	12	+ 14' 06"	
43	Marcus Burghardt	Germany	Bora–Hansgrohe	35	149	+ 5h 09' 59"	
44	Davide Formolo	Italy	Bora–Hansgrohe	25	22	+ 57' 29"	
45	Rafał Majka	Poland	Bora–Hansgrohe	28	13	+ 17' 57"	
46	Jay McCarthy	Australia	Bora–Hansgrohe	25	91	+ 3h 05' 02"	
47	Lukas Pöstlberger	Austria	Bora–Hansgrohe	26	DNS-19	–	
48	Michael Schwarzmann	Germany	Bora–Hansgrohe	27	150	+ 5h 10' 42"	
51	Thibaut Pinot	France	Groupama–FDJ	28	6	+ 5' 57"	
52	Mickaël Delage	France	Groupama–FDJ	33	112	+ 4h 02' 45"	
53	Antoine Duchesne	Canada	Groupama–FDJ	26	127	+ 4h 29' 30"	
54	Rudy Molard	France	Groupama–FDJ	28	14	+ 25' 40"	
55	Georg Preidler	Austria	Groupama–FDJ	28	DNF-11	–	
56	Marc Sarreau †	France	Groupama–FDJ	25	131	+ 4h 38' 36"	
57	Benjamin Thomas †	France	Groupama–FDJ	22	121	+ 4h 22' 41"	
58	Léo Vincent †	France	Groupama–FDJ	22	77	+ 2h 43' 29"	
61	Tiesj Benoot †	Belgium	Lotto–Soudal	24	95	+ 3h 14' 12"	
62	Sander Armée	Belgium	Lotto–Soudal	32	73	+ 2h 30' 18"	
63	Victor Campenaerts	Belgium	Lotto–Soudal	26	102	+ 3h 43' 36"	
64	Thomas De Gendt	Belgium	Lotto–Soudal	31	67	+ 2h 22' 10"	
65	Bjorg Lambrecht †	Belgium	Lotto–Soudal	21	DNS-15	–	
66	Maxime Monfort	Belgium	Lotto–Soudal	35	42	+ 1h 43' 23"	
67	Tosh Van der Sande	Belgium	Lotto–Soudal	25	114	+ 4h 08' 34"	
68	Jelle Wallays	Belgium	Lotto–Soudal	29	143	+ 4h 56' 42"	
71	Simon Yates	Great Britain	Mitchelton–Scott	26	1	82h 05' 58"	
72	Michael Albasini	Switzerland	Mitchelton–Scott	37	118	+ 4h 15' 40"	
73	Alexander Edmondson †	Australia	Mitchelton–Scott	24	155	+ 5h 24' 24"	
74	Jack Haig †	Australia	Mitchelton–Scott	24	19	+ 45' 32"	
75	Damien Howson	Australia	Mitchelton–Scott	26	70	+ 2h 29' 16"	
76	Luka Mezgec	Slovenia	Mitchelton–Scott	30	141	+ 4h 55' 25"	
77	Matteo Trentin	Italy	Mitchelton–Scott	29	125	+ 4h 28' 10"	
78	Adam Yates	Great Britain	Mitchelton–Scott	26	45	+ 1h 54' 33"	
81	Nairo Quintana	Colombia	Movistar Team	28	8	+ 6' 51"	
82	Andrey Amador	Costa Rica	Movistar Team	31	93	+ 3h 10' 46"	
83	Winner Anacona	Colombia	Movistar Team	30	69	+ 2h 25' 25"	
84	Daniele Bennati	Italy	Movistar Team	37	133	+ 4h 45' 32"	
85	Richard Carapaz †	Ecuador	Movistar Team	25	18	+ 39' 53"	
86	Imanol Erviti	Spain	Movistar Team	34	92	+ 3h 10' 45"	
87	Nélson Oliveira	Portugal	Movistar Team	29	71	+ 2h 30' 07"	
88	Alejandro Valverde	Spain	Movistar Team	38	5	+ 4' 28"	
91	Elia Viviani	Italy	Quick-Step Floors	29	145	+ 5h 01' 37"	
92	Kasper Asgreen †	Denmark	Quick-Step Floors	23	134	+ 4h 48' 07"	
93	Laurens De Plus †	Belgium	Quick-Step Floors	22	DNF-19	–	
94	Dries Devenyns	Belgium	Quick-Step Floors	35	94	+ 3h 14' 01"	
95	Enric Mas †	Spain	Quick-Step Floors	23	2	+ 1' 46"	
96	Michael Mørkøv	Denmark	Quick-Step Floors	33	148	+ 5h 07' 42"	
97	Fabio Sabatini	Italy	Quick-Step Floors	33	152	+ 5h 13' 46"	
98	Pieter Serry	Belgium	Quick-Step Floors	29	88	+ 3h 00' 05"	
101	Louis Meintjes	South Africa	Team Dimension Data	26	58	+ 2h 06' 00"	
102	Igor Antón	Spain	Team Dimension Data	35	44	+ 1h 52' 53"	
103	Steven Cummings	Great Britain	Team Dimension Data	37	124	+ 4h 27' 54"	
104	Amanuel Gebrezgabihier †	Eritrea	Team Dimension Data	24	37	+ 1h 30' 43"	
105	Ryan Gibbons †	South Africa	Team Dimension Data	24	82	+ 2h 55' 03"	
106	Ben King	United States	Team Dimension Data	29	24	+ 1h 03' 40"	
107	Merhawi Kudus †	Eritrea	Team Dimension Data	24	31	+ 1h 19' 54"	
108	Johann van Zyl	South Africa	Team Dimension Data	27	122	+ 4h 22' 54"	
111	Rigoberto Urán	Colombia	EF Education First–Drapac p/b Cannondale	31	7	+ 6' 07"	
112	Simon Clarke	Australia	EF Education First–Drapac p/b Cannondale	32	46	+ 1h 55' 01"	
113	Mitchell Docker	Australia	EF Education First–Drapac p/b Cannondale	31	151	+ 5h 13' 26"	
114	Sebastian Langeveld	Netherlands	EF Education First–Drapac p/b Cannondale	33	128	+ 4h 31' 50"	
115	Daniel Moreno	Spain	EF Education First–Drapac p/b Cannondale	36	38	+ 1h 32' 59"	
116	Pierre Rolland	France	EF Education First–Drapac p/b Cannondale	31	56	+ 2h 04' 34"	
117	Tom Van Asbroeck	Belgium	EF Education First–Drapac p/b Cannondale	28	87	+ 2h 59' 30"	
118	Michael Woods	Canada	EF Education First–Drapac p/b Cannondale	31	34	+ 1h 23' 13"	
121	Ilnur Zakarin	Russia	Team Katusha–Alpecin	28	20	+ 51' 36"	
122	Ian Boswell	United States	Team Katusha–Alpecin	27	126	+ 4h 28' 13"	
123	José Gonçalves	Portugal	Team Katusha–Alpecin	29	DNF-13	–	
124	Reto Hollenstein	Switzerland	Team Katusha–Alpecin	33	55	+ 2h 04' 03"	
125	Pavel Kochetkov	Russia	Team Katusha–Alpecin	32	53	+ 2h 01' 36"	
126	Maurits Lammertink	Netherlands	Team Katusha–Alpecin	27	DNS-8	–	
127	Tiago Machado	Portugal	Team Katusha–Alpecin	32	79	+ 2h 48' 38"	
128	Jhonatan Restrepo †	Colombia	Team Katusha–Alpecin	23	105	+ 3h 47' 21"	
131	Steven Kruijswijk	Netherlands	LottoNL–Jumbo	31	4	+ 2' 54"	
132	George Bennett	New Zealand	LottoNL–Jumbo	28	35	+ 1h 24' 17"	
133	Lars Boom	Netherlands	LottoNL–Jumbo	32	153	+ 5h 19' 07"	
134	Floris De Tier	Belgium	LottoNL–Jumbo	26	41	+ 1h 42' 58"	
135	Sepp Kuss †	United States	LottoNL–Jumbo	23	65	+ 2h 20' 11"	
136	Tom Leezer	Netherlands	LottoNL–Jumbo	32	139	+ 4h 53' 56"	
137	Bert-Jan Lindeman	Netherlands	LottoNL–Jumbo	29	136	+ 4h 52' 40"	
138	Danny van Poppel †	Netherlands	LottoNL–Jumbo	25	132	+ 4h 38' 47"	
141	David de la Cruz	Spain	Team Sky	29	15	+ 28' 02"	
142	Jonathan Castroviejo	Spain	Team Sky	31	100	+ 3h 30' 00"	
143	Tao Geoghegan Hart †	Great Britain	Team Sky	23	62	+ 2h 13' 56"	
144	Sergio Henao	Colombia	Team Sky	30	28	+ 1h 13' 07"	
145	Michał Kwiatkowski	Poland	Team Sky	28	43	+ 1h 43' 49"	
146	Salvatore Puccio	Italy	Team Sky	28	96	+ 3h 15' 09"	
147	Pavel Sivakov †	Russia	Team Sky	21	DNF-14	–	
148	Dylan van Baarle	Netherlands	Team Sky	26	DNS-14	–	
151	Wilco Kelderman	Netherlands	Team Sunweb	27	10	+ 11' 11"	
152	Johannes Fröhlinger	Germany	Team Sunweb	33	115	+ 4h 11' 01"	
153	Simon Geschke	Germany	Team Sunweb	32	DNS-18	–	
154	Jai Hindley †	Australia	Team Sunweb	22	32	+ 1h 21' 38"	
155	Michael Storer †	Australia	Team Sunweb	21	117	+ 4h 12' 32"	
156	Mike Teunissen	Netherlands	Team Sunweb	26	109	+ 3h 58' 38"	
157	Martijn Tusveld †	Netherlands	Team Sunweb	24	80	+ 2h 49' 31"	
158	Max Walscheid †	Germany	Team Sunweb	25	156	+ 5h 25' 57"	
161	Bauke Mollema	Netherlands	Trek–Segafredo	31	30	+ 1h 17' 39"	
162	Gianluca Brambilla	Italy	Trek–Segafredo	31	16	+ 30' 00"	
163	Matthias Brändle	Austria	Trek–Segafredo	28	158	+ 5h 53' 31"	
164	Nicola Conci †	Italy	Trek–Segafredo	21	DNS-16	–	
165	Fabio Felline	Italy	Trek–Segafredo	28	61	+ 2h 11' 02"	
166	Markel Irizar	Spain	Trek–Segafredo	38	130	+ 4h 37' 11"	
167	Giacomo Nizzolo	Italy	Trek–Segafredo	29	140	+ 4h 54' 29"	
168	Kiel Reijnen	United States	Trek–Segafredo	32	135	+ 4h 49' 50"	
171	Fabio Aru	Italy	UAE Team Emirates	28	23	+ 1h 03' 07"	
172	Sven Erik Bystrøm	Norway	UAE Team Emirates	26	113	+ 4h 06' 25"	
173	Simone Consonni †	Italy	UAE Team Emirates	23	147	+ 5h 02' 02"	
174	Valerio Conti †	Italy	UAE Team Emirates	25	60	+ 2h 09' 59"	
175	Vegard Stake Laengen	Norway	UAE Team Emirates	29	107	+ 3h 56' 34"	
176	Daniel Martin	Ireland	UAE Team Emirates	32	DNS-10	–	
177	Simone Petilli †	Italy	UAE Team Emirates	25	DNF-10	–	
178	Edward Ravasi †	Italy	UAE Team Emirates	24	39	+ 1h 34' 57"	
181	José Mendes	Portugal	Burgos BH	33	83	+ 2h 57' 10"	
182	Jetse Bol	Netherlands	Burgos BH	28	101	+ 3h 35' 55"	
183	Óscar Cabedo †	Spain	Burgos BH	23	86	+ 2h 58' 27"	
184	Jorge Cubero	Spain	Burgos BH	25	89	+ 3h 03' 35"	
185	Jesús Ezquerra	Spain	Burgos BH	27	98	+ 3h 27' 49"	
186	Jordi Simón	Spain	Burgos BH	27	DNF-17	–	
187	Diego Rubio	Spain	Burgos BH	27	138	+ 4h 53' 48"	
188	Pablo Torres	Spain	Burgos BH	30	129	+ 4h 34' 43"	
191	Sergio Pardilla	Spain	Caja Rural–Seguros RGA	34	49	+ 1h 57' 41"	
192	Alex Aranburu †	Spain	Caja Rural–Seguros RGA	22	108	+ 3h 57' 33"	
193	Jonathan Lastra †	Spain	Caja Rural–Seguros RGA	25	123	+ 4h 26' 51"	
194	Lluís Mas	Spain	Caja Rural–Seguros RGA	28	47	+ 1h 57' 26"	
195	Antonio Molina	Spain	Caja Rural–Seguros RGA	27	120	+ 4h 18' 48"	
196	Cristián Rodríguez †	Spain	Caja Rural–Seguros RGA	23	25	+ 1h 06' 26"	
197	Nick Schultz †	Australia	Caja Rural–Seguros RGA	23	75	+ 2h 39' 38"	
198	Nelson Soto †	Colombia	Caja Rural–Seguros RGA	24	154	+ 5h 20' 28"	
201	Nacer Bouhanni	France	Cofidis	28	DNF-11	–	
202	Loïc Chetout	France	Cofidis	25	144	+ 5h 00' 35"	
203	Jesús Herrada	Spain	Cofidis	28	21	+ 57' 15"	
204	José Herrada	Spain	Cofidis	32	57	+ 2h 05' 41"	
205	Mathias Le Turnier †	France	Cofidis	23	110	+ 4h 00' 26"	
206	Luis Ángel Maté	Spain	Cofidis	34	106	+ 3h 55' 56"	
207	Stéphane Rossetto	France	Cofidis	31	54	+ 2h 01' 43"	
208	Kenneth Vanbilsen	Belgium	Cofidis	28	137	+ 4h 53' 07"	
211	Eduard Prades	Spain	Euskadi–Murias	31	68	+ 2h 24' 10"	
212	Jon Aberasturi	Spain	Euskadi–Murias	29	146	+ 5h 01' 45"	
213	Aritz Bagües	Spain	Euskadi–Murias	29	78	+ 2h 45' 48"	
214	Mikel Bizkarra	Spain	Euskadi–Murias	29	17	+ 35' 46"	
215	Garikoitz Bravo	Spain	Euskadi–Murias	29	116	+ 4h 12' 25"	
216	Mikel Iturria	Spain	Euskadi–Murias	26	103	+ 3h 45' 05"	
217	Óscar Rodríguez †	Spain	Euskadi–Murias	23	51	+ 1h 58' 53"	
218	Héctor Sáez †	Spain	Euskadi–Murias	24	85	+ 2h 57' 30"	

=== By team ===
Bahrain–Merida (TBM)
No.	Rider	Pos.
1	Vincenzo Nibali (ITA)	59
2	Iván García (ESP)	99
3	Gorka Izagirre (ESP)	29
4	Ion Izagirre (ESP)	9
5	Mark Padun (UKR)	DNF-17
6	Franco Pellizotti (ITA)	50
7	Hermann Pernsteiner (AUT)	DNS-18
8	Luka Pibernik (SLO)	142
Directeur sportif: Gorazd Štangelj / Harald Morscher

AG2R La Mondiale (ALM)
No.	Rider	Pos.
11	Hubert Dupont (FRA)	26
12	Mikaël Cherel (FRA)	97
13	Julien Duval (FRA)	157
14	Tony Gallopin (FRA)	11
15	Ben Gastauer (LUX)	36
16	Alexandre Geniez (FRA)	90
17	Alexis Gougeard (FRA)	DNF-11
18	Nans Peters (FRA)	72
Directeur sportif: Julien Jurdie / Stéphane Goubert

Astana (AST)
No.	Rider	Pos.
21	Miguel Ángel López (COL)	3
22	Pello Bilbao (ESP)	27
23	Dario Cataldo (ITA)	64
24	Omar Fraile (ESP)	63
25	Jan Hirt (CZE)	74
26	Nikita Stalnov (KAZ)	104
27	Davide Villella (ITA)	48
28	Andrey Zeits (KAZ)	52
Directeur sportif: Alexandr Shefer / Dmitri Sedoun

BMC Racing Team (BMC)
No.	Rider	Pos.
31	Richie Porte (AUS)	84
32	Brent Bookwalter (USA)	66
33	Alessandro De Marchi (ITA)	76
34	Rohan Dennis (AUS)	DNS-17
35	Nicolas Roche (IRL)	40
36	Joey Rosskopf (USA)	81
37	Dylan Teuns (BEL)	33
38	Francisco Ventoso (ESP)	111
Directeur sportif: Jackson Stewart / Klaas Lodewyck

Bora–Hansgrohe (BOH)
No.	Rider	Pos.
41	Peter Sagan (SVK)	119
42	Emanuel Buchmann (GER)	12
43	Marcus Burghardt (GER)	149
44	Davide Formolo (ITA)	22
45	Rafał Majka (POL)	13
46	Jay McCarthy (AUS)	91
47	Lukas Pöstlberger (AUT)	DNS-19
48	Michael Schwarzmann (GER)	150
Directeur sportif: Steffen Radochla / André Schulze

Groupama–FDJ (GFC)
No.	Rider	Pos.
51	Thibaut Pinot (FRA)	6
52	Mickaël Delage (FRA)	112
53	Antoine Duchesne (CAN)	127
54	Rudy Molard (FRA)	14
55	Georg Preidler (AUT)	DNF-11
56	Marc Sarreau (FRA)	131
57	Benjamin Thomas (FRA)	121
58	Léo Vincent (FRA)	77
Directeur sportif: Thierry Bricaud / Franck Pineau

Lotto–Soudal (LTS)
No.	Rider	Pos.
61	Tiesj Benoot (BEL)	95
62	Sander Armée (BEL)	73
63	Victor Campenaerts (BEL)	102
64	Thomas De Gendt (BEL)	67
65	Bjorg Lambrecht (BEL)	DNS-15
66	Maxime Monfort (BEL)	42
67	Tosh Van der Sande (BEL)	114
68	Jelle Wallays (BEL)	143
Directeur sportif: Mario Aerts / Marc Wauters

Mitchelton–Scott (MTS)
No.	Rider	Pos.
71	Simon Yates (GBR)	1
72	Michael Albasini (SUI)	118
73	Alexander Edmondson (AUS)	155
74	Jack Haig (AUS)	19
75	Damien Howson (AUS)	70
76	Luka Mezgec (SLO)	141
77	Matteo Trentin (ITA)	125
78	Adam Yates (GBR)	45
Directeur sportif: Matt White / David McPartland

Movistar Team (MOV)
No.	Rider	Pos.
81	Nairo Quintana (COL)	8
82	Andrey Amador (CRC)	93
83	Winner Anacona (COL)	69
84	Daniele Bennati (ITA)	133
85	Richard Carapaz (ECU)	18
86	Imanol Erviti (ESP)	92
87	Nélson Oliveira (POR)	71
88	Alejandro Valverde (ESP)	5
Directeur sportif: José Luis Arrieta / Pablo Lastras

Quick-Step Floors (QST)
No.	Rider	Pos.
91	Elia Viviani (ITA)	145
92	Kasper Asgreen (DEN)	134
93	Laurens De Plus (BEL)	DNF-19
94	Dries Devenyns (BEL)	94
95	Enric Mas (ESP)	2
96	Michael Mørkøv (DEN)	148
97	Fabio Sabatini (ITA)	152
98	Pieter Serry (BEL)	88
Directeur sportif: Rik Van Slycke / Geert Van Bondt

Team Dimension Data (DDD)
No.	Rider	Pos.
101	Louis Meintjes (RSA)	58
102	Igor Antón (ESP)	44
103	Steven Cummings (GBR)	124
104	Amanuel Gebrezgabihier (ERI)	37
105	Ryan Gibbons (RSA)	82
106	Ben King (USA)	24
107	Merhawi Kudus (ERI)	31
108	Johann van Zyl (RSA)	122
Directeur sportif: Alex Sans Vega / Bingen Fernández

EF Education First–Drapac p/b Cannondale (EFD)
No.	Rider	Pos.
111	Rigoberto Urán (COL)	7
112	Simon Clarke (AUS)	46
113	Mitchell Docker (AUS)	151
114	Sebastian Langeveld (NED)	128
115	Daniel Moreno (ESP)	38
116	Pierre Rolland (FRA)	56
117	Tom Van Asbroeck (BEL)	87
118	Michael Woods (CAN)	34
Directeur sportif: Juan Manuel Gárate / Fabrizio Guidi

Team Katusha–Alpecin (KAT)
No.	Rider	Pos.
121	Ilnur Zakarin (RUS)	20
122	Ian Boswell (USA)	126
123	José Gonçalves (POR)	DNF-13
124	Reto Hollenstein (SUI)	55
125	Pavel Kochetkov (RUS)	53
126	Maurits Lammertink (NED)	DNS-8
127	Tiago Machado (POR)	79
128	Jhonatan Restrepo (COL)	105
Directeur sportif: Dimitri Konyshev / Xavier Florencio

LottoNL–Jumbo (TLJ)
No.	Rider	Pos.
131	Steven Kruijswijk (NED)	4
132	George Bennett (NZL)	35
133	Lars Boom (NED)	153
134	Floris De Tier (BEL)	41
135	Sepp Kuss (USA)	65
136	Tom Leezer (NED)	139
137	Bert-Jan Lindeman (NED)	136
138	Danny van Poppel (NED)	132
Directeur sportif: Grischa Niermann / Addy Engels

Team Sky (SKY)
No.	Rider	Pos.
141	David de la Cruz (ESP)	15
142	Jonathan Castroviejo (ESP)	100
143	Tao Geoghegan Hart (GBR)	62
144	Sergio Henao (COL)	28
145	Michał Kwiatkowski (POL)	43
146	Salvatore Puccio (ITA)	96
147	Pavel Sivakov (RUS)	DNF-14
148	Dylan van Baarle (NED)	DNS-14
Directeur sportif: Gabriel Rasch / Xabier Zandio

Team Sunweb (SUN)
No.	Rider	Pos.
151	Wilco Kelderman (NED)	10
152	Johannes Fröhlinger (GER)	115
153	Simon Geschke (GER)	DNS-18
154	Jai Hindley (AUS)	32
155	Michael Storer (AUS)	117
156	Mike Teunissen (NED)	109
157	Martijn Tusveld (NED)	80
158	Max Walscheid (GER)	156
Directeur sportif: Aike Visbeek / Tom Veelers

Trek–Segafredo (TFS)
No.	Rider	Pos.
161	Bauke Mollema (NED)	30
162	Gianluca Brambilla (ITA)	16
163	Matthias Brändle (AUT)	158
164	Nicola Conci (ITA)	DNS-16
165	Fabio Felline (ITA)	61
166	Markel Irizar (ESP)	130
167	Giacomo Nizzolo (ITA)	140
168	Kiel Reijnen (USA)	135
Directeur sportif: Dirk Demol / Yaroslav Popovych

UAE Team Emirates (UAD)
No.	Rider	Pos.
171	Fabio Aru (ITA)	23
172	Sven Erik Bystrøm (NOR)	113
173	Simone Consonni (ITA)	147
174	Valerio Conti (ITA)	60
175	Vegard Stake Laengen (NOR)	107
176	Daniel Martin (IRL)	DNS-10
177	Simone Petilli (ITA)	DNF-10
178	Edward Ravasi (ITA)	39
Directeur sportif: Philippe Mauduit / Bruno Vicino

Burgos BH (BBH)
No.	Rider	Pos.
181	José Mendes (POR)	83
182	Jetse Bol (NED)	101
183	Óscar Cabedo (ESP)	86
184	Jorge Cubero (ESP)	89
185	Jesús Ezquerra (ESP)	98
186	Jordi Simón (ESP)	DNF-17
187	Diego Rubio (ESP)	138
188	Pablo Torres (ESP)	129
Directeur sportif: José Cabedo

Caja Rural–Seguros RGA (CJR)
No.	Rider	Pos.
191	Sergio Pardilla (ESP)	49
192	Alex Aranburu (ESP)	108
193	Jonathan Lastra (ESP)	123
194	Lluís Mas (ESP)	47
195	Antonio Molina (ESP)	120
196	Cristián Rodríguez (ESP)	25
197	Nick Schultz (AUS)	75
198	Nelson Soto (COL)	154
Directeur sportif: Eugenio Goikoetxea / José Miguel Fernández

Cofidis (COF)
No.	Rider	Pos.
201	Nacer Bouhanni (FRA)	DNF-11
202	Loïc Chetout (FRA)	144
203	Jesús Herrada (ESP)	21
204	José Herrada (ESP)	57
205	Mathias Le Turnier (FRA)	110
206	Luis Ángel Maté (ESP)	106
207	Stéphane Rossetto (FRA)	54
208	Kenneth Vanbilsen (BEL)	137
Directeur sportif: Jean-Luc Jonrond / Christian Guiberteau

Euskadi–Murias (EUS)
No.	Rider	Pos.
211	Eduard Prades (ESP)	68
212	Jon Aberasturi (ESP)	146
213	Aritz Bagües (ESP)	78
214	Mikel Bizkarra (ESP)	17
215	Garikoitz Bravo (ESP)	116
216	Mikel Iturria (ESP)	103
217	Óscar Rodríguez (ESP)	51
218	Héctor Sáez (ESP)	85
Directeur sportif: Xabier Muriel / David Echavarri

=== By nationality ===
The 176 riders that are competing in the 2018 Vuelta a España originated from 30 different countries.

Country	No. of riders	Finishers	Stage wins
Australia	11	10	3 (Rohan Dennis x2, Simon Clarke)
Austria	4	1	
Belgium	15	13	1 (Jelle Wallays)
Canada	2	2	1 (Michael Woods)
Colombia	7	7	
Costa Rica	1	1	
Czechia	1	1	
Denmark	2	2	
Ecuador	1	1	
Eritrea	2	2	
France	18	16	5 (Nacer Bouhanni, Tony Gallopin, Alexandre Geniez, Thibaut Pinot x2)
Germany	6	5	
Great Britain	4	4	1 (Simon Yates)
Ireland	2	1	
Italy	20	18	4 (Elia Viviani x3, Alessandro De Marchi)
Kazakhstan	2	2	
Luxembourg	1	1	
Netherlands	13	11	
New Zealand	1	1	
Norway	2	2	
Poland	2	2	
Portugal	4	3	
Russia	3	2	
Slovakia	1	1	
Slovenia	2	2	
South Africa	3	3	
Spain	37	36	4 (Alejandro Valverde x2, Óscar Rodríguez, Enric Mas)
Switzerland	2	2	
Ukraine	1	0	
United States	6	6	2 (Ben King x2)
Total	176	158	21
