= List of teams and cyclists in the 2019 Vuelta a España =

List of cyclists

The following is a list of teams and cyclists that will take part in the 2019 Vuelta a España.

== Teams ==
The 18 UCI WorldTeams are automatically invited to the race. In addition, four Procontinental teams obtained a wildcard, bringing the number of teams to 22.

The teams entering the race will be:

UCI WorldTeams

- AG2R La Mondiale
- Astana
- Bahrain–Merida
- Bora–Hansgrohe
- CCC Team
- Deceuninck–Quick-Step
- EF Education First
- Groupama–FDJ
- Lotto–Soudal
- Mitchelton–Scott
- Movistar Team
- Team Dimension Data
- Team Ineos
- Team Jumbo–Visma
- Team Katusha–Alpecin
- Team Sunweb
- Trek–Segafredo
- UAE Team Emirates

UCI Professional Continental teams

- Burgos BH
- Caja Rural–Seguros RGA
- Cofidis
- Euskadi–Murias

== Cyclists ==
Legend
No.	Starting number worn by the rider during the Vuelta
Pos.	Position in the general classification
Time	Deficit to the winner of the general classification
†	Denotes riders born on or after 1 January 1994 eligible for the young rider classification
	Denotes the winner of the general classification
	Denotes the winner of the points classification
	Denotes the winner of the mountains classification
	Denotes the winner of the young rider classification
A white jersey with a red number bib.	Denotes the winner of the team classification
A white jersey with a yellow number bib.	Denotes the winner of the combativity award
DNS	Denotes a rider who did not start, followed by the stage before which he withdrew
DNF	Denotes a rider who did not finish, followed by the stage in which he withdrew
DSQ	Denotes a rider who was disqualified from the race, followed by the stage in which this occurred
HD	Denotes a rider finished outside the time limit, followed by the stage in which they did so
Age correct as of 24 August 2019, the date on which the Vuelta began

=== By starting number ===
No.	Name	Nationality	Team	Age	Pos.	Time	Ref.
1	Alejandro Valverde	Spain	Movistar Team	39	2	+ 2' 33"	
2	Jorge Arcas	Spain	Movistar Team	27	93	+ 3h 39' 12"	
3	José Joaquín Rojas	Spain	Movistar Team	34	30	+ 1h 44' 02"	
4	Imanol Erviti	Spain	Movistar Team	35	64	+ 2h 53' 02"	
5	Nelson Oliveira	Portugal	Movistar Team	30	46	+ 2h 21' 16"	
6	Antonio Pedrero	Spain	Movistar Team	27	43	+ 2h 20' 11"	
7	Nairo Quintana	Colombia	Movistar Team	29	4	+ 3' 46"	
8	Marc Soler	Spain	Movistar Team	25	9	+ 22' 27"	
11	Pierre Latour	France	AG2R La Mondiale	25	35	+ 1h 59' 04"	
12	François Bidard	France	AG2R La Mondiale	27	24	+ 1h 25' 44"	
13	Geoffrey Bouchard	France	AG2R La Mondiale	27	47	+ 2h 25' 49"	
14	Clément Chevrier	France	AG2R La Mondiale	27	58	+ 2h 49' 02"	
15	Silvan Dillier	Switzerland	AG2R La Mondiale	29	72	+ 3h 09' 54"	
16	Dorian Godon †	France	AG2R La Mondiale	23	77	+ 3h 22' 00"	
17	Quentin Jaurégui †	France	AG2R La Mondiale	25	81	+ 3h 28' 13"	
18	Clément Venturini	France	AG2R La Mondiale	25	90	+ 3h 37' 27"	
21	Miguel Ángel López †	Colombia	Astana	25	5	+ 4' 48"	
22	Manuele Boaro	Italy	Astana	32	128	+ 4h 32' 50"	
23	Dario Cataldo	Italy	Astana	34	68	+ 3h 06' 30"	
24	Omar Fraile	Spain	Astana	29	79	+ 3h 27' 25"	
25	Jakob Fuglsang	Denmark	Astana	34	13	+ 26' 49"	
26	Gorka Izagirre	Spain	Astana	31	53	+ 2h 37' 30"	
27	Ion Izagirre	Spain	Astana	30	16	+ 42' 00"	
28	Luis León Sánchez	Spain	Astana	35	23	+ 1h 17' 09"	
31	Mark Padun †	Ukraine	Bahrain–Merida	23	84	+ 3h 30' 25"	
32	Yukiya Arashiro	Japan	Bahrain–Merida	34	110	+ 4h 13' 18"	
33	Phil Bauhaus †	Germany	Bahrain–Merida	25	DNF-9	-	
34	Heinrich Haussler	Australia	Bahrain–Merida	35	132	+ 4h 37' 44"	
35	Domen Novak †	Slovenia	Bahrain–Merida	24	123	+ 4h 27' 28"	
36	Hermann Pernsteiner	Austria	Bahrain–Merida	29	15	+ 33' 40"	
37	Luka Pibernik	Slovenia	Bahrain–Merida	25	109	+ 4h 12' 17"	
38	Dylan Teuns	Belgium	Bahrain–Merida	27	12	+ 24' 06"	
41	Rafał Majka	Poland	Bora–Hansgrohe	29	6	+ 7' 33"	
42	Shane Archbold	New Zealand	Bora–Hansgrohe	30	151	+ 5h 30' 01"	
43	Sam Bennett	Ireland	Bora–Hansgrohe	28	134	+ 4h 41' 44"	
44	Jempy Drucker	Luxembourg	Bora–Hansgrohe	32	DNS-20	-	
45	Felix Großschartner	Austria	Bora–Hansgrohe	25	36	+ 2h 03' 33"	
46	Davide Formolo	Italy	Bora–Hansgrohe	26	DNS-7	-	
47	Gregor Mühlberger †	Austria	Bora–Hansgrohe	25	DNF-5	-	
48	Paweł Poljański	Poland	Bora–Hansgrohe	29	57	+ 2h 44' 06"	
51	Víctor de la Parte	Spain	CCC Team	33	DNF-6	-	
52	Will Barta †	United States	CCC Team	23	131	+ 4h 36' 26"	
53	Paweł Bernas	Poland	CCC Team	29	149	+ 5h 22' 19"	
54	Patrick Bevin	New Zealand	CCC Team	28	DNS-15	-	
55	Jonas Koch	Germany	CCC Team	26	60	+ 2h 51' 21"	
56	Szymon Sajnok †	Poland	CCC Team	22	142	+ 5h 01' 03"	
57	Nathan Van Hooydonck †	Belgium	CCC Team	23	114	+ 4h 20' 35"	
58	Francisco José Ventoso	Spain	CCC Team	37	97	+ 3h 41' 38"	
61	Philippe Gilbert	Belgium	Deceuninck–Quick-Step	37	32	+ 1h 50' 02"	
62	Eros Capecchi	Italy	Deceuninck–Quick-Step	33	121	+ 4h 26' 16"	
63	Rémi Cavagna †	France	Deceuninck–Quick-Step	24	52	+ 2h 35' 04"	
64	Tim Declercq	Belgium	Deceuninck–Quick-Step	30	78	+ 3h 27' 05"	
65	Fabio Jakobsen †	Netherlands	Deceuninck–Quick-Step	22	145	+ 5h 06' 45"	
66	James Knox †	Great Britain	Deceuninck–Quick-Step	23	11	+ 22' 55"	
67	Maximiliano Richeze	Argentina	Deceuninck–Quick-Step	36	148	+ 5h 20' 32"	
68	Zdeněk Štybar	Czechia	Deceuninck–Quick-Step	33	55	+ 2h 39' 31"	
71	Rigoberto Urán	Colombia	EF Education First	32	DNF-6	-	
72	Hugh Carthy †	Great Britain	EF Education First	25	DNF-6	-	
73	Lawson Craddock	United States	EF Education First	27	59	+ 2h 49' 16"	
74	Mitchell Docker	Australia	EF Education First	32	122	+ 4h 26' 59"	
75	Sergio Higuita †	Colombia	EF Education First	22	14	+ 32' 17"	
76	Daniel Martínez †	Colombia	EF Education First	23	41	+ 2h 13' 20"	
77	Logan Owen †	United States	EF Education First	24	126	+ 4h 31' 27"	
78	Tejay van Garderen	United States	EF Education First	31	DNF-7	-	
81	Marc Sarreau	France	Groupama–FDJ	26	139	+ 4h 56' 21"	
82	Bruno Armirail †	France	Groupama–FDJ	25	91	+ 3h 38' 04"	
83	Mickaël Delage	France	Groupama–FDJ	34	DNS-3	-	
84	Kilian Frankiny †	Switzerland	Groupama–FDJ	25	21	+ 1h 11' 42"	
85	Tobias Ludvigsson	Sweden	Groupama–FDJ	28	44	+ 2h 20' 23"	
86	Steve Morabito	Switzerland	Groupama–FDJ	36	67	+ 3h 02' 11"	
87	Romain Seigle †	France	Groupama–FDJ	24	80	+ 3h 28' 02"	
88	Benjamin Thomas †	France	Groupama–FDJ	23	DNS-12	-	
91	Thomas De Gendt	Belgium	Lotto–Soudal	32	56	+ 2h 40' 02"	
92	Sander Armée	Belgium	Lotto–Soudal	33	73	+ 3h 10' 27"	
93	Carl Fredrik Hagen	Norway	Lotto–Soudal	27	8	+ 12' 54"	
94	Tomasz Marczyński	Poland	Lotto–Soudal	35	74	+ 3h 15' 09"	
95	Tosh Van der Sande	Belgium	Lotto–Soudal	28	65	+ 2h 53' 26"	
96	Brian van Goethem	Netherlands	Lotto–Soudal	28	DNF-15	-	
97	Harm Vanhoucke †	Belgium	Lotto–Soudal	22	115	+ 4h 20' 46"	
98	Jelle Wallays	Belgium	Lotto–Soudal	30	144	+ 5h 03' 52"	
101	Esteban Chaves	Colombia	Mitchelton–Scott	29	19	+ 53' 03"	
102	Sam Bewley	New Zealand	Mitchelton–Scott	32	100	+ 3h 51' 31"	
103	Tsgabu Grmay	Ethiopia	Mitchelton–Scott	27	62	+ 2h 52' 26"	
104	Damien Howson	Australia	Mitchelton–Scott	27	49	+ 2h 29' 32"	
105	Luka Mezgec	Slovenia	Mitchelton–Scott	31	DNS-15	-	
106	Mikel Nieve	Spain	Mitchelton–Scott	35	10	+ 22' 34"	
107	Nick Schultz †	Australia	Mitchelton–Scott	24	63	+ 2h 52' 42"	
108	Dion Smith	New Zealand	Mitchelton–Scott	26	83	+ 3h 29' 59"	
111	Louis Meintjes	South Africa	Team Dimension Data	27	51	+ 2h 34' 53"	
112	Nic Dlamini †	South Africa	Team Dimension Data	24	107	+ 4h 05' 44"	
113	Amanuel Ghebreigzabhier †	Eritrea	Team Dimension Data	25	DNF-18	-	
114	Edvald Boasson Hagen	Norway	Team Dimension Data	32	96	+ 3h 40' 52"	
115	Ben King	United States	Team Dimension Data	30	38	+ 2h 10' 03"	
116	Ben O’Connor †	Australia	Team Dimension Data	23	25	+ 1h 25' 53"	
117	Rasmus Tiller †	Norway	Team Dimension Data	23	130	+ 4h 34' 22"	
118	Jaco Venter	South Africa	Team Dimension Data	32	129	+ 4h 33' 59"	
121	Wout Poels	Netherlands	Team Ineos	31	34	+ 1h 58' 10"	
122	David de la Cruz	Spain	Team Ineos	30	66	+ 2h 53' 50"	
123	Owain Doull	Great Britain	Team Ineos	26	71	+ 3h 08' 12"	
124	Tao Geoghegan Hart †	Great Britain	Team Ineos	24	20	+ 1h 04' 21"	
125	Sebastián Henao	Colombia	Team Ineos	26	39	+ 2h 12' 22"	
126	Vasil Kiryienka	Belarus	Team Ineos	38	DNF-18	-	
127	Salvatore Puccio	Italy	Team Ineos	29	89	+ 3h 33' 38"	
128	Ian Stannard	Great Britain	Team Ineos	32	106	+ 4h 05' 25"	
131	Primož Roglič	Slovenia	Team Jumbo–Visma	29	1	83h 07' 14"	
132	George Bennett	New Zealand	Team Jumbo–Visma	29	33	+ 1h 55' 19"	
133	Robert Gesink	Netherlands	Team Jumbo–Visma	33	27	+ 1h 29' 07"	
134	Lennard Hofstede †	Netherlands	Team Jumbo–Visma	24	152	+ 5h 40' 23"	
135	Steven Kruijswijk	Netherlands	Team Jumbo–Visma	32	DNF-4	-	
136	Sepp Kuss †	United States	Team Jumbo–Visma	25	29	+ 1h 35' 33"	
137	Tony Martin	Germany	Team Jumbo–Visma	34	DNF-19	-	
138	Neilson Powless †	United States	Team Jumbo–Visma	22	31	+ 1h 48' 21"	
141	Daniel Navarro	Spain	Team Katusha–Alpecin	36	40	+ 2h 12' 29"	
142	Enrico Battaglin	Italy	Team Katusha–Alpecin	29	113	+ 4h 18' 37"	
143	Steff Cras †	Belgium	Team Katusha–Alpecin	23	76	+ 3h 21' 04"	
144	Matteo Fabbro †	Italy	Team Katusha–Alpecin	24	54	+ 2h 37' 58"	
145	Ruben Guerreiro †	Portugal	Team Katusha–Alpecin	25	17	+ 42' 05"	
146	Pavel Kochetkov	Russia	Team Katusha–Alpecin	33	98	+ 3h 42' 27"	
147	Vyacheslav Kuznetsov	Russia	Team Katusha–Alpecin	30	138	+ 4h 50' 26"	
148	Willie Smit	South Africa	Team Katusha–Alpecin	26	118	+ 4h 23' 33"	
151	Wilco Kelderman	Netherlands	Team Sunweb	28	7	+ 10' 04"	
152	Nikias Arndt	Germany	Team Sunweb	27	69	+ 3h 06' 44"	
153	Casper Pedersen †	Denmark	Team Sunweb	23	103	+ 4h 00' 14"	
154	Robert Power †	Australia	Team Sunweb	24	92	+ 3h 38' 42"	
155	Nicolas Roche	Ireland	Team Sunweb	35	DNF-6	-	
156	Michael Storer †	Australia	Team Sunweb	22	99	+ 3h 50' 04"	
157	Martijn Tusveld	Netherlands	Team Sunweb	25	26	+ 1h 27' 32"	
158	Max Walscheid	Germany	Team Sunweb	26	137	+ 4h 46' 52"	
161	Gianluca Brambilla	Italy	Trek–Segafredo	32	42	+ 2h 16' 17"	
162	John Degenkolb	Germany	Trek–Segafredo	30	124	+ 4h 28' 32"	
163	Niklas Eg †	Denmark	Trek–Segafredo	24	37	+ 2h 04' 41"	
164	Alex Kirsch	Luxembourg	Trek–Segafredo	27	125	+ 4h 29' 56"	
165	Jacopo Mosca	Italy	Trek–Segafredo	25	85	+ 3h 30' 55"	
166	Kiel Reijnen	United States	Trek–Segafredo	33	141	+ 4h 59' 41"	
167	Peter Stetina	United States	Trek–Segafredo	32	28	+ 1h 32' 25"	
168	Edward Theuns	Belgium	Trek–Segafredo	28	133	+ 4h 39' 26"	
171	Fabio Aru	Italy	UAE Team Emirates	29	DNS-13	-	
172	Valerio Conti	Italy	UAE Team Emirates	26	70	+ 3h 08' 00"	
173	Fernando Gaviria †	Colombia	UAE Team Emirates	25	147	+ 5h 11' 32"	
174	Sergio Henao	Colombia	UAE Team Emirates	31	45	+ 2h 20' 29"	
175	Marco Marcato	Italy	UAE Team Emirates	35	DNF-19	-	
176	Juan Sebastián Molano †	Colombia	UAE Team Emirates	24	143	+ 5h 01' 03"	
177	Tadej Pogačar †	Slovenia	UAE Team Emirates	20	3	+ 2' 55"	
178	Oliviero Troia †	Italy	UAE Team Emirates	24	150	+ 5h 25' 27"	
181	Ángel Madrazo	Spain	Burgos BH	31	119	+ 4h 24' 11"	
182	Jetse Bol	Netherlands	Burgos BH	29	104	+ 4h 04' 01"	
183	Óscar Cabedo †	Spain	Burgos BH	24	116	+ 4h 21' 49"	
184	Jorge Cubero	Spain	Burgos BH	26	136	+ 4h 45' 34"	
185	Jesús Ezquerra	Spain	Burgos BH	28	120	+ 4h 26' 12"	
186	Nuno Matos †	Portugal	Burgos BH	25	153	+ 5h 56' 19"	
187	Diego Rubio	Spain	Burgos BH	28	146	+ 5h 07' 04"	
188	Ricardo Vilela	Portugal	Burgos BH	31	105	+ 4h 04' 41"	
191	Sergey Chernetskiy	Russia	Caja Rural–Seguros RGA	29	111	+ 4h 14' 38"	
192	Jon Aberasturi	Spain	Caja Rural–Seguros RGA	30	140	+ 4h 59' 08"	
193	Alex Aranburu †	Spain	Caja Rural–Seguros RGA	23	94	+ 3h 39' 43"	
194	Domingos Gonçalves	Portugal	Caja Rural–Seguros RGA	30	DNS-14	-	
195	Jonathan Lastra	Spain	Caja Rural–Seguros RGA	26	101	+ 3h 57' 29"	
196	Sergio Pardilla	Spain	Caja Rural–Seguros RGA	35	88	+ 3h 32' 24"	
197	Cristián Rodríguez †	Spain	Caja Rural–Seguros RGA	24	50	+ 2h 29' 33"	
198	Gonzalo Serrano †	Spain	Caja Rural–Seguros RGA	25	135	+ 4h 42' 56"	
201	Jesús Herrada	Spain	Cofidis	29	DNS-17	-	
202	Darwin Atapuma	Colombia	Cofidis	31	61	+ 2h 51' 36"	
203	Nicolas Edet	France	Cofidis	31	18	+ 46' 24"	
204	Jesper Hansen	Denmark	Cofidis	28	DNF-15	-	
205	José Herrada	Spain	Cofidis	33	75	+ 3h 20' 26"	
206	Luis Ángel Maté	Spain	Cofidis	35	102	+ 3h 57' 38"	
207	Stéphane Rossetto	France	Cofidis	32	127	+ 4h 31' 47"	
208	Damien Touzé †	France	Cofidis	23	108	+ 4h 08' 25"	
211	Óscar Rodríguez †	Spain	Euskadi–Murias	24	22	+ 1h 13' 14"	
212	Aritz Bagües	Spain	Euskadi–Murias	30	117	+ 4h 22' 14"	
213	Fernando Barceló †	Spain	Euskadi–Murias	23	95	+ 3h 40' 19"	
214	Cyril Barthe †	France	Euskadi–Murias	23	86	+ 3h 31' 36"	
215	Mikel Bizkarra	Spain	Euskadi–Murias	30	48	+ 2h 28' 43"	
216	Mikel Iturria	Spain	Euskadi–Murias	27	87	+ 3h 31' 50"	
217	Héctor Sáez	Spain	Euskadi–Murias	25	82	+ 3h 28' 53"	
218	Sergio Samitier †	Spain	Euskadi–Murias	23	112	+ 4h 16' 49"	

=== By team ===
Movistar Team (MOV)
No.	Rider	Pos.
1	Alejandro Valverde (ESP)	2
2	Jorge Arcas (ESP)	93
3	José Joaquín Rojas (ESP)	30
4	Imanol Erviti (ESP)	64
5	Nelson Oliveira (POR)	46
6	Antonio Pedrero (ESP)	43
7	Nairo Quintana (COL)	4
8	Marc Soler (ESP)	9
Directeur sportif: José Luis Arrieta Lujambio/Pablo Lastras García

AG2R La Mondiale (ALM)
No.	Rider	Pos.
11	Pierre Latour (FRA)	35
12	François Bidard (FRA)	24
13	Geoffrey Bouchard (FRA)	47
14	Clément Chevrier (FRA)	58
15	Silvan Dillier (SUI)	72
16	Dorian Godon (FRA)	77
17	Quentin Jaurégui (FRA)	81
18	Clément Venturini (FRA)	90
Directeur sportif: Julien Jurdie/Stéphane Goubert

Astana (AST)
No.	Rider	Pos.
21	Miguel Ángel López (COL)	5
22	Manuele Boaro (ITA)	128
23	Dario Cataldo (ITA)	68
24	Omar Fraile (ESP)	79
25	Jakob Fuglsang (DEN)	13
26	Gorka Izagirre (ESP)	53
27	Ion Izagirre (ESP)	16
28	Luis León Sánchez (ESP)	23
Directeur sportif: Alexandr Shefer/Dmitri Sedoun

Bahrain–Merida (TBM)
No.	Rider	Pos.
31	Mark Padun (UKR)	84
32	Yukiya Arashiro (JPN)	110
33	Phil Bauhaus (GER)	DNF-9
34	Heinrich Haussler (AUS)	132
35	Domen Novak (SLO)	123
36	Hermann Pernsteiner (AUT)	15
37	Luka Pibernik (SLO)	109
38	Dylan Teuns (BEL)	12
Directeur sportif: Vladimir Miholjević/Rik Verbrugghe

Bora–Hansgrohe (BOH)
No.	Rider	Pos.
41	Rafał Majka (POL)	6
42	Shane Archbold (NZL)	151
43	Sam Bennett (IRL)	134
44	Jempy Drucker (LUX)	DNS-20
45	Felix Großschartner (AUT)	36
46	Davide Formolo (ITA)	DNS-7
47	Gregor Mühlberger (AUT)	DNF-5
48	Paweł Poljański (POL)	57
Directeur sportif: Steffen Radochla/Patxi Vila Errandonea

CCC Team (CCC)
No.	Rider	Pos.
51	Víctor de la Parte (ESP)	DNF-6
52	Will Barta (USA)	131
53	Paweł Bernas (POL)	149
54	Patrick Bevin (NZL)	DNS-15
55	Jonas Koch (GER)	60
56	Szymon Sajnok (POL)	142
57	Nathan Van Hooydonck (BEL)	114
58	Francisco José Ventoso (ESP)	97
Directeur sportif: Jackson Stewart/Gabriele Missaglia

Deceuninck–Quick-Step (DQT)
No.	Rider	Pos.
61	Philippe Gilbert (BEL)	32
62	Eros Capecchi (ITA)	121
63	Rémi Cavagna (FRA)	52
64	Tim Declercq (BEL)	78
65	Fabio Jakobsen (NED)	145
66	James Knox (GBR)	11
67	Maximiliano Richeze (ARG)	148
68	Zdeněk Štybar (CZE)	55
Directeur sportif: Wilfried Peeters/Klaas Lodewyck

EF Education First (EF1)
No.	Rider	Pos.
71	Rigoberto Urán (COL)	DNF-6
72	Hugh Carthy (GBR)	DNF-6
73	Lawson Craddock (USA)	59
74	Mitchell Docker (AUS)	122
75	Sergio Higuita (COL)	14
76	Daniel Martínez (COL)	41
77	Logan Owen (USA)	126
78	Tejay van Garderen (USA)	DNF-7
Directeur sportif: Juan Manuel Gárate Cepa/Ken Vanmarcke

Groupama–FDJ (GFC)
No.	Rider	Pos.
81	Marc Sarreau (FRA)	139
82	Bruno Armirail (FRA)	91
83	Mickaël Delage (FRA)	DNS-3
84	Kilian Frankiny (SUI)	21
85	Tobias Ludvigsson (SWE)	44
86	Steve Morabito (SUI)	67
87	Romain Seigle (FRA)	80
88	Benjamin Thomas (FRA)	DNS-12
Directeur sportif: Franck Pineau/Thierry Bricaud

Lotto–Soudal (LTS)
No.	Rider	Pos.
91	Thomas De Gendt (BEL)	56
92	Sander Armée (BEL)	73
93	Carl Fredrik Hagen (NOR)	8
94	Tomasz Marczyński (POL)	74
95	Tosh Van der Sande (BEL)	65
96	Brian van Goethem (NED)	DNF-15
97	Harm Vanhoucke (BEL)	115
98	Jelle Wallays (BEL)	144
Directeur sportif: Mario Aerts/Kevin De Weert

Mitchelton–Scott (MTS)
No.	Rider	Pos.
101	Esteban Chaves (COL)	19
102	Sam Bewley (NZL)	100
103	Tsgabu Grmay (ETH)	62
104	Damien Howson (AUS)	49
105	Luka Mezgec (SLO)	DNS-15
106	Mikel Nieve (ESP)	10
107	Nick Schultz (AUS)	63
108	Dion Smith (NZL)	83
Directeur sportif: Julian Dean/Laurenzo Lapage

Team Dimension Data (TDD)
No.	Rider	Pos.
111	Louis Meintjes (SAF)	51
112	Nic Dlamini (SAF)	107
113	Amanuel Ghebreigzabhier (ERI)	DNF-18
114	Edvald Boasson Hagen (NOR)	96
115	Ben King (USA)	38
116	Ben O'Connor (AUS)	25
117	Rasmus Tiller (NOR)	130
118	Jaco Venter (SAF)	129
Directeur sportif: Bingen Fernández Bustinza/Alexandre Sans Vega

Team Ineos (INS)
No.	Rider	Pos.
121	Wout Poels (NED)	34
122	David de la Cruz (ESP)	66
123	Owain Doull (GBR)	71
124	Tao Geoghegan Hart (GBR)	20
125	Sebastián Henao (COL)	39
126	Vasil Kiryienka (BLR)	DNF-18
127	Salvatore Puccio (ITA)	89
128	Ian Stannard (GBR)	106
Directeur sportif: Nicolas Portal/Xabier Zandio Echaide

Team Jumbo–Visma (TJV)
No.	Rider	Pos.
131	Primož Roglič (SLO)	1
132	George Bennett (NZL)	33
133	Robert Gesink (NED)	27
134	Lennard Hofstede (NED)	152
135	Steven Kruijswijk (NED)	DNF-4
136	Sepp Kuss (USA)	29
137	Tony Martin (GER)	DNF-19
138	Neilson Powless (USA)	31
Directeur sportif: Addy Engels/Sierk-Jan de Haan

Team Katusha–Alpecin (TKA)
No.	Rider	Pos.
141	Daniel Navarro (ESP)	40
142	Enrico Battaglin (ITA)	113
143	Steff Cras (BEL)	76
144	Matteo Fabbro (ITA)	54
145	Ruben Guerreiro (POR)	17
146	Pavel Kochetkov (RUS)	98
147	Vyacheslav Kuznetsov (RUS)	138
148	Willie Smit (SAF)	118
Directeur sportif: Dmitri Konychev/Xavier Florencio

Team Sunweb (SUN)
No.	Rider	Pos.
151	Wilco Kelderman (NED)	7
152	Nikias Arndt (GER)	69
153	Casper Pedersen (DEN)	103
154	Robert Power (AUS)	92
155	Nicolas Roche (IRL)	DNF-6
156	Michael Storer (AUS)	99
157	Martijn Tusveld (NED)	26
158	Max Walscheid (GER)	137
Directeur sportif: Luke Roberts/Arthur van Dongen

Trek–Segafredo (TFS)
No.	Rider	Pos.
161	Gianluca Brambilla (ITA)	42
162	John Degenkolb (GER)	124
163	Niklas Eg (DEN)	37
164	Alex Kirsch (LUX)	125
165	Jacopo Mosca (ITA)	85
166	Kiel Reijnen (USA)	141
167	Peter Stetina (USA)	28
168	Edward Theuns (BEL)	133
Directeur sportif: Yaroslav Popovych/Grégory Rast

UAE Team Emirates (UAD)
No.	Rider	Pos.
171	Fabio Aru (ITA)	DNS-13
172	Valerio Conti (ITA)	70
173	Fernando Gaviria (COL)	147
174	Sergio Henao (COL)	45
175	Marco Marcato (ITA)	DNF-19
176	Juan Sebastián Molano (COL)	143
177	Tadej Pogačar (SLO)	3
178	Oliviero Troia (ITA)	150
Directeur sportif: José Antonio Fernández/Andrej Hauptman

Burgos BH (BBH)
No.	Rider	Pos.
181	Ángel Madrazo (ESP)	119
182	Jetse Bol (NED)	104
183	Óscar Cabedo (ESP)	116
184	Jorge Cubero (ESP)	136
185	Jesús Ezquerra (ESP)	120
186	Nuno Matos (POR)	153
187	Diego Rubio (ESP)	146
188	Ricardo Vilela (POR)	105
Directeur sportif: José Cabedo Carda/Santi Barranco Medina

Caja Rural–Seguros RGA (CJR)
No.	Rider	Pos.
191	Sergey Chernetskiy (RUS)	111
192	Jon Aberasturi (ESP)	140
193	Alex Aranburu (ESP)	94
194	Domingos Gonçalves (POR)	DNS-14
195	Jonathan Lastra (ESP)	101
196	Sergio Pardilla (ESP)	88
197	Cristián Rodríguez (ESP)	50
198	Gonzalo Serrano (ESP)	135
Directeur sportif: José Miguel Fernández Reviejo/Genaro Prego Dominguez

Cofidis (COF)
No.	Rider	Pos.
201	Jesús Herrada (ESP)	DNS-17
202	Darwin Atapuma (COL)	61
203	Nicolas Edet (FRA)	18
204	Jesper Hansen (DEN)	DNF-15
205	José Herrada (ESP)	75
206	Luis Ángel Maté (ESP)	102
207	Stéphane Rossetto (FRA)	127
208	Damien Touzé (FRA)	108
Directeur sportif: Christian Guiberteau/Thierry Marichal

Euskadi–Murias (EUS)
No.	Rider	Pos.
211	Óscar Rodríguez (ESP)	22
212	Aritz Bagües (ESP)	117
213	Fernando Barceló (ESP)	95
214	Cyril Barthe (FRA)	86
215	Mikel Bizkarra (ESP)	48
216	Mikel Iturria (ESP)	87
217	Héctor Sáez (ESP)	82
218	Sergio Samitier (ESP)	112
Directeur sportif: Rubén Pérez Moreno/Xabier Muriel Otegi

=== By nationality ===
The 176 riders that are competing in the 2019 Vuelta a España originated from 30 different countries.

Country	No. of riders	Finishers	Stage wins
Argentina	1	1	
Australia	7	7	
Austria	3	2	
Belarus	1	0	
Belgium	11	11	2 (Philippe Gilbert x2)
Colombia	11	10	2 (Nairo Quintana, Sergio Higuita)
Czechia	1	1	
Denmark	4	3	1 (Jakob Fuglsang)
Eritrea	1	0	
Ethiopia	1	1	
France	17	15	1 (Rémi Cavagna)
Germany	6	4	1 (Nikias Arndt)
Great Britain	5	4	
Ireland	2	1	2 (Sam Bennett x2)
Italy	13	10	
Japan	1	1	
Luxembourg	2	1	
Netherlands	9	7	2 (Fabio Jakobsen x2)
New Zealand	5	4	
Norway	3	3	
Poland	5	5	
Portugal	5	4	
Russia	3	3	
Slovenia	5	4	4 (Tadej Pogačar x3, Primož Roglič)
South Africa	4	4	
Spain	36	34	4 (Ángel Madrazo, Jesús Herrada, Alejandro Valverde, Mikel Iturria)
Sweden	1	1	
Switzerland	3	3	
Ukraine	1	1	
United States	9	8	1 (Sepp Kuss)
Total	176	153	20

- As the first stage was a team time trial, the winning team is not included in the list of stage winners
