= 2018 Vuelta a España, Stage 1 to Stage 11 =

Long-distance bicycle race stages

The 2018 Vuelta a España was the 73rd edition of the Vuelta a España, one of cycling's Grand Tours. The Vuelta began in Málaga, with an individual time trial on 25 August, and Stage 11 occurred on 5 September with a stage to Ribeira Sacra/Luíntra. The race finished in Madrid on 16 September.

== Classification standings ==
Legend (Note: Jerseys appearing in the table on the left of the page indicate those worn by the cyclist during the particular stage, while those appearing in the table on the right of the page indicate those awarded to the cyclist after the stage.)
Red jersey	Denotes the leader of the general classification	Green jersey	Denotes the leader of the points classification
Blue polka dot jersey	Denotes the leader of the mountains classification	White jersey	Denotes the leader of the combination rider classification

== Stage 1 ==
25 August 2018 — Málaga to Málaga, 8 km (5.0 mi) (ITT)

Stage 1 result and general classification
Rank	Rider	Team	Time
1	Rohan Dennis (AUS)	BMC Racing Team	9' 39"
2	Michał Kwiatkowski (POL)	Team Sky	+ 6"
3	Victor Campenaerts (BEL)	Lotto–Soudal	+ 7"
4	Nelson Oliveira (POR)	Movistar Team	+ 17"
5	Dylan van Baarle (NED)	Team Sky	+ 20"
6	Alessandro De Marchi (ITA)	BMC Racing Team	+ 21"
7	Jonathan Castroviejo (ESP)	Team Sky	+ 21"
8	Simon Geschke (GER)	Team Sunweb	+ 21"
9	Ion Izagirre (ESP)	Bahrain–Merida	+ 22"
10	Wilco Kelderman (NED)	Team Sunweb	+ 22"

== Stage 2 ==
26 August 2018 — Marbella to Caminito del Rey, 163.9 km (101.8 mi)

The stage departed west and then north from Marbella, passing over the category 2 Puerto de Ojén at 555 m (1,821 ft) and descending through Coín. The route turned west and then north to Alozaina, then east through Zalea to Pizarra. The race then turned north to El Chorro, then west to the first climb of the category 3 Alto de Guadalhorce, and then passed through the finish line for the first time. The route then wound north before turning back south and passing over the category 3 Alto de Ardales, and descended south to start the second pass of the route east from Zalea. The race had an intermediate sprint at Pizarra, before continuing north to El Chorro and turning west for the final climb of the category 3 Alto de Guadalhorce. The finish, about 2 km (1.2 mi) west of the actual Caminito del Rey, then followed within a few hundred metres of the final climb.

Stage 2 result
Rank	Rider	Team	Time
1	Alejandro Valverde (ESP)	Movistar Team	4h 13' 01"
2	Michał Kwiatkowski (POL)	Team Sky	s.t.
3	Laurens De Plus (BEL)	Quick-Step Floors	+ 3"
4	Wilco Kelderman (NED)	Team Sunweb	+ 3"
5	George Bennett (NZL)	LottoNL–Jumbo	+ 3"
6	Tony Gallopin (FRA)	AG2R La Mondiale	+ 3"
7	Emanuel Buchmann (GER)	Bora–Hansgrohe	+ 3"
8	Rigoberto Urán (COL)	EF Education First–Drapac	+ 3"
9	Nairo Quintana (COL)	Movistar Team	+ 3"
10	Thibaut Pinot (FRA)	Groupama–FDJ	+ 3"

General classification after stage 2
Rank	Rider	Team	Time
1	Michał Kwiatkowski (POL)	Team Sky	4h 22' 40"
2	Alejandro Valverde (ESP)	Movistar Team	+ 14"
3	Wilco Kelderman (NED)	Team Sunweb	+ 25"
4	Laurens De Plus (BEL)	Quick-Step Floors	+ 28"
5	Ion Izagirre (ESP)	Bahrain–Merida	+ 30"
6	Fabio Felline (ITA)	Trek–Segafredo	+ 30"
7	Emanuel Buchmann (GER)	Bora–Hansgrohe	+ 32"
8	Tony Gallopin (FRA)	AG2R La Mondiale	+ 33"
9	Nairo Quintana (COL)	Movistar Team	+ 33"
10	Bauke Mollema (NED)	Trek–Segafredo	+ 35"

== Stage 3 ==
27 August 2018 — Mijas to Alhaurín de la Torre, 182.5 km (113.4 mi)

Stage 3 result
Rank	Rider	Team	Time
1	Elia Viviani (ITA)	Quick-Step Floors	4h 48' 12"
2	Giacomo Nizzolo (ITA)	Trek–Segafredo	s.t.
3	Peter Sagan (SVK)	Bora–Hansgrohe	s.t.
4	Nacer Bouhanni (FRA)	Cofidis	s.t.
5	Simone Consonni (ITA)	UAE Team Emirates	s.t.
6	Danny van Poppel (NED)	LottoNL–Jumbo	s.t.
7	Michael Mørkøv (DEN)	Quick-Step Floors	s.t.
8	Matteo Trentin (ITA)	Mitchelton–Scott	s.t.
9	Ryan Gibbons (RSA)	Team Dimension Data	s.t.
10	Tom Van Asbroeck (BEL)	EF Education First–Drapac	s.t.

General classification after stage 3
Rank	Rider	Team	Time
1	Michał Kwiatkowski (POL)	Team Sky	9h 10' 52"
2	Alejandro Valverde (ESP)	Movistar Team	+ 14"
3	Wilco Kelderman (NED)	Team Sunweb	+ 25"
4	Laurens De Plus (BEL)	Quick-Step Floors	+ 28"
5	Ion Izagirre (ESP)	Bahrain–Merida	+ 30"
6	Fabio Felline (ITA)	Trek–Segafredo	+ 30"
7	Emanuel Buchmann (GER)	Bora–Hansgrohe	+ 32"
8	Tony Gallopin (FRA)	AG2R La Mondiale	+ 33"
9	Nairo Quintana (COL)	Movistar Team	+ 33"
10	Bauke Mollema (NED)	Trek–Segafredo	+ 35"

== Stage 4 ==
28 August 2018 — Vélez-Málaga to Alfacar, 162 km (101 mi)

Stage 4 result
Rank	Rider	Team	Time
1	Benjamin King (USA)	Team Dimension Data	4h 33' 12"
2	Nikita Stalnov (KAZ)	Astana	+ 2"
3	Pierre Rolland (FRA)	EF Education First–Drapac	+ 13"
4	Luis Ángel Maté (ESP)	Cofidis	+ 1' 08"
5	Ben Gastauer (LUX)	AG2R La Mondiale	+ 1' 39"
6	Jelle Wallays (BEL)	Lotto–Soudal	+ 1' 57"
7	Óscar Cabedo (ESP)	Burgos BH	+ 2' 24"
8	Simon Yates (GBR)	Mitchelton–Scott	+ 2' 48"
9	Emanuel Buchmann (GER)	Bora–Hansgrohe	+ 2' 50"
10	Miguel Ángel López (COL)	Astana	+ 3' 07"

General classification after stage 4
Rank	Rider	Team	Time
1	Michał Kwiatkowski (POL)	Team Sky	13h 47' 19"
2	Emanuel Buchmann (GER)	Bora–Hansgrohe	+ 7"
3	Simon Yates (GBR)	Mitchelton–Scott	+ 10"
4	Alejandro Valverde (ESP)	Movistar Team	+ 12"
5	Wilco Kelderman (NED)	Team Sunweb	+ 25"
6	Ion Izagirre (ESP)	Bahrain–Merida	+ 30"
7	Tony Gallopin (FRA)	AG2R La Mondiale	+ 33"
8	Nairo Quintana (COL)	Movistar Team	+ 33"
9	Steven Kruijswijk (NED)	LottoNL–Jumbo	+ 37"
10	Enric Mas (ESP)	Quick-Step Floors	+ 42"

== Stage 5 ==
29 August 2018 — Granada to Roquetas de Mar, 188 km (117 mi)

Stage 5 result
Rank	Rider	Team	Time
1	Simon Clarke (AUS)	EF Education First–Drapac	4h 36' 07"
2	Bauke Mollema (NED)	Trek–Segafredo	s.t.
3	Alessandro De Marchi (ITA)	BMC Racing Team	s.t.
4	Davide Villella (ITA)	Astana	+ 8"
5	Floris De Tier (BEL)	LottoNL–Jumbo	+ 8"
6	Rudy Molard (FRA)	Groupama–FDJ	+ 8"
7	Maxime Monfort (BEL)	Lotto–Soudal	+ 1' 58"
8	Jonathan Lastra (ESP)	Caja Rural–Seguros RGA	+ 2' 00"
9	Franco Pellizotti (ITA)	Bahrain–Merida	+ 2' 00"
10	Merhawi Kudus (ERI)	Team Dimension Data	+ 2' 00"

General classification after stage 5 (Note: Mollard received a 20 second penalty for taking an illegal feed.)
Rank	Rider	Team	Time
1	Rudy Molard (FRA)	Groupama–FDJ	18h 27' 20"
2	Michał Kwiatkowski (POL)	Team Sky	+ 41"
3	Emanuel Buchmann (GER)	Bora–Hansgrohe	+ 48"
4	Simon Yates (GBR)	Mitchelton–Scott	+ 51"
5	Alejandro Valverde (ESP)	Movistar Team	+ 53"
6	Wilco Kelderman (NED)	Team Sunweb	+ 1' 06"
7	Ion Izagirre (ESP)	Bahrain–Merida	+ 1' 11"
8	Tony Gallopin (FRA)	AG2R La Mondiale	+ 1' 14"
9	Nairo Quintana (COL)	Movistar Team	+ 1' 14"
10	Steven Kruijswijk (NED)	LottoNL–Jumbo	+ 1' 18"

== Stage 6 ==
30 August 2018 — Huércal-Overa to San Javier, 153 km (95 mi)

Stage 6 result
Rank	Rider	Team	Time
1	Nacer Bouhanni (FRA)	Cofidis	3h 58' 35"
2	Danny van Poppel (NED)	LottoNL–Jumbo	s.t.
3	Elia Viviani (ITA)	Quick-Step Floors	s.t.
4	Simone Consonni (ITA)	UAE Team Emirates	s.t.
5	Matteo Trentin (ITA)	Mitchelton–Scott	s.t.
6	Iván García (ESP)	Bahrain–Merida	s.t.
7	Omar Fraile (ESP)	Astana	s.t.
8	Miguel Ángel López (COL)	Astana	s.t.
9	Peter Sagan (SVK)	Bora–Hansgrohe	s.t.
10	Michael Mørkøv (DEN)	Quick-Step Floors	s.t.

General classification after stage 6
Rank	Rider	Team	Time
1	Rudy Molard (FRA)	Groupama–FDJ	22h 26' 15"
2	Michał Kwiatkowski (POL)	Team Sky	+ 41"
3	Emanuel Buchmann (GER)	Bora–Hansgrohe	+ 48"
4	Simon Yates (GBR)	Mitchelton–Scott	+ 51"
5	Alejandro Valverde (ESP)	Movistar Team	+ 53"
6	Ion Izagirre (ESP)	Bahrain–Merida	+ 1' 11"
7	Tony Gallopin (FRA)	AG2R La Mondiale	+ 1' 14"
8	Nairo Quintana (COL)	Movistar Team	+ 1' 14"
9	Steven Kruijswijk (NED)	LottoNL–Jumbo	+ 1' 18"
10	Enric Mas (ESP)	Quick-Step Floors	+ 1' 23"

== Stage 7 ==
31 August 2018 — Puerto Lumbreras to Pozo Alcón, 182 km (113 mi)

Stage 7 result
Rank	Rider	Team	Time
1	Tony Gallopin (FRA)	AG2R La Mondiale	4h 18' 20"
2	Peter Sagan (SVK)	Bora–Hansgrohe	+ 5"
3	Alejandro Valverde (ESP)	Movistar Team	+ 5"
4	Eduard Prades (ESP)	Euskadi–Murias	+ 5"
5	Omar Fraile (ESP)	Astana	+ 5"
6	Rigoberto Urán (COL)	EF Education First–Drapac	+ 5"
7	Ion Izagirre (ESP)	Bahrain–Merida	+ 5"
8	Enric Mas (ESP)	Quick-Step Floors	+ 5"
9	Wilco Kelderman (NED)	Team Sunweb	+ 5"
10	Sepp Kuss (USA)	LottoNL–Jumbo	+ 5"

General classification after stage 7
Rank	Rider	Team	Time
1	Rudy Molard (FRA)	Groupama–FDJ	26h 44' 40"
2	Alejandro Valverde (ESP)	Movistar Team	+ 47"
3	Emanuel Buchmann (GER)	Bora–Hansgrohe	+ 48"
4	Simon Yates (GBR)	Mitchelton–Scott	+ 51"
5	Tony Gallopin (FRA)	AG2R La Mondiale	+ 59"
6	Michał Kwiatkowski (POL)	Team Sky	+ 1' 06"
7	Ion Izagirre (ESP)	Bahrain–Merida	+ 1' 11"
8	Nairo Quintana (COL)	Movistar Team	+ 1' 14"
9	Steven Kruijswijk (NED)	LottoNL–Jumbo	+ 1' 18"
10	Enric Mas (ESP)	Quick-Step Floors	+ 1' 23"

== Stage 8 ==
1 September 2018 — Linares to Almadén, 195.5 km (121.5 mi)

Stage 8 result
Rank	Rider	Team	Time
1	Alejandro Valverde (ESP)	Movistar Team	4h 35' 54"
2	Peter Sagan (SVK)	Bora–Hansgrohe	s.t
3	Danny van Poppel (NED)	LottoNL–Jumbo	s.t
4	Ion Izagirre (ESP)	Bahrain–Merida	s.t
5	Giacomo Nizzolo (ITA)	Trek–Segafredo	s.t
6	Jesús Herrada (ESP)	Cofidis	s.t
7	Simon Yates (GBR)	Mitchelton–Scott	s.t
8	Bjorg Lambrecht (BEL)	Lotto–Soudal	s.t
9	Iván García (ESP)	Bahrain–Merida	s.t
10	Steven Kruijswijk (NED)	LottoNL–Jumbo	s.t

General classification after stage 8
Rank	Rider	Team	Time
1	Rudy Molard (FRA)	Groupama–FDJ	31h 20' 34"
2	Alejandro Valverde (ESP)	Movistar Team	+ 37"
3	Emanuel Buchmann (GER)	Bora–Hansgrohe	+ 48"
4	Simon Yates (GBR)	Mitchelton–Scott	+ 51"
5	Tony Gallopin (FRA)	AG2R La Mondiale	+ 59"
6	Michał Kwiatkowski (POL)	Team Sky	+ 1' 06"
7	Ion Izagirre (ESP)	Bahrain–Merida	+ 1' 11"
8	Nairo Quintana (COL)	Movistar Team	+ 1' 14"
9	Steven Kruijswijk (NED)	LottoNL–Jumbo	+ 1' 18"
10	Enric Mas (ESP)	Quick-Step Floors	+ 1' 23"

== Stage 9 ==
2 September 2018 — Talavera de la Reina to La Covatilla, 195 km (121 mi)

Stage 9 result
Rank	Rider	Team	Time
1	Benjamin King (USA)	Team Dimension Data	5h 30' 38"
2	Bauke Mollema (NED)	Trek–Segafredo	+ 48"
3	Dylan Teuns (BEL)	BMC Racing Team	+ 2' 38"
4	Miguel Ángel López (COL)	Astana	+ 2' 40"
5	Nairo Quintana (COL)	Movistar Team	+ 2' 40"
6	Wilco Kelderman (NED)	Team Sunweb	+ 2' 40"
7	Rigoberto Urán (COL)	EF Education First–Drapac	+ 2' 43"
8	Ion Izagirre (ESP)	Bahrain–Merida	+ 2' 46"
9	Simon Yates (GBR)	Mitchelton–Scott	+ 2' 49"
10	George Bennett (NZL)	LottoNL–Jumbo	+ 3' 02"

General classification after stage 9
Rank	Rider	Team	Time
1	Simon Yates (GBR)	Mitchelton–Scott	36h 54' 32"
2	Alejandro Valverde (ESP)	Movistar Team	+ 1"
3	Nairo Quintana (COL)	Movistar Team	+ 14"
4	Emanuel Buchmann (GER)	Bora–Hansgrohe	+ 16"
5	Ion Izagirre (ESP)	Bahrain–Merida	+ 17"
6	Tony Gallopin (FRA)	AG2R La Mondiale	+ 24"
7	Miguel Ángel López (COL)	Astana	+ 27"
8	Rigoberto Urán (COL)	EF Education First–Drapac	+ 32"
9	Steven Kruijswijk (NED)	LottoNL–Jumbo	+ 43"
10	George Bennett (NZL)	LottoNL–Jumbo	+ 48"

== Rest day 1 ==
3 September 2018 — Salamanca

Dan Martin retired from the race on the first rest day.

== Stage 10 ==
4 September 2018 — Salamanca to Fermoselle, 172.5 km (107.2 mi)

Stage 10 result
Rank	Rider	Team	Time
1	Elia Viviani (ITA)	Quick-Step Floors	4h 08' 08"
2	Peter Sagan (SVK)	Bora–Hansgrohe	s.t.
3	Giacomo Nizzolo (ITA)	Trek–Segafredo	s.t.
4	Nelson Soto (COL)	Caja Rural–Seguros RGA	s.t.
5	Marc Sarreau (FRA)	Groupama–FDJ	s.t.
6	Danny van Poppel (NED)	LottoNL–Jumbo	s.t.
7	Iván García (ESP)	Bahrain–Merida	s.t.
8	Jon Aberasturi (ESP)	Euskadi–Murias	s.t.
9	Simone Consonni (ITA)	UAE Team Emirates	s.t.
10	Matteo Trentin (ITA)	Mitchelton–Scott	s.t.

General classification after stage 10
Rank	Rider	Team	Time
1	Simon Yates (GBR)	Mitchelton–Scott	41h 03' 00"
2	Alejandro Valverde (ESP)	Movistar Team	+ 1"
3	Nairo Quintana (COL)	Movistar Team	+ 14"
4	Emanuel Buchmann (GER)	Bora–Hansgrohe	+ 16"
5	Ion Izagirre (ESP)	Bahrain–Merida	+ 17"
6	Tony Gallopin (FRA)	AG2R La Mondiale	+ 24"
7	Miguel Ángel López (COL)	Astana	+ 27"
8	Rigoberto Urán (COL)	EF Education First–Drapac	+ 32"
9	Steven Kruijswijk (NED)	LottoNL–Jumbo	+ 43"
10	George Bennett (NZL)	LottoNL–Jumbo	+ 47"

== Stage 11 ==
5 September 2018 — Mombuey to Ribeira Sacra/Luíntra, 207.8 km (129.1 mi)

Stage 11 result
Rank	Rider	Team	Time
1	Alessandro De Marchi (ITA)	BMC Racing Team	4h 52' 38"
2	Jhonatan Restrepo (COL)	Team Katusha–Alpecin	+ 28"
3	Franco Pellizotti (ITA)	Bahrain–Merida	+ 59"
4	Nans Peters (FRA)	AG2R La Mondiale	+ 1' 24"
5	Dylan Teuns (BEL)	BMC Racing Team	+ 1' 45"
6	Tiesj Benoot (BEL)	Lotto–Soudal	+ 1' 46"
7	Rafał Majka (POL)	Bora–Hansgrohe	+ 1' 46"
8	Nicolas Roche (IRL)	BMC Racing Team	+ 1' 48"
9	Sergio Henao (COL)	Team Sky	+ 1' 50"
10	Thibaut Pinot (FRA)	Groupama–FDJ	+ 1' 50"

General classification after stage 11
Rank	Rider	Team	Time
1	Simon Yates (GBR)	Mitchelton–Scott	45h 57' 40"
2	Alejandro Valverde (ESP)	Movistar Team	+ 1"
3	Nairo Quintana (COL)	Movistar Team	+ 14"
4	Ion Izagirre (ESP)	Bahrain–Merida	+ 17"
5	Tony Gallopin (FRA)	AG2R La Mondiale	+ 24"
6	Emanuel Buchmann (GER)	Bora–Hansgrohe	+ 24"
7	Miguel Ángel López (COL)	Astana	+ 27"
8	Rigoberto Urán (COL)	EF Education First–Drapac	+ 32"
9	Steven Kruijswijk (NED)	LottoNL–Jumbo	+ 43"
10	George Bennett (NZL)	LottoNL–Jumbo	+ 47"
