= Bricaud =

Bricaud is a surname. Notable people with the surname include:

- Jean Bricaud (1881–1934), French student of the occult and esoteric matters
- Thierry Bricaud (born 1969), French cyclist and sporting director
