= 2018 Vuelta a España, Stage 12 to Stage 21 =

Long-distance bicycle race stages

The 2018 Vuelta a España is the 73rd edition of the Vuelta a España, one of cycling's Grand Tours. The Vuelta began in Málaga, with an individual time trial on 25 August, and Stage 12 occurred on 6 September with a stage from Mondoñedo. The race finishes in Madrid on 16 September.

== Classification standings ==
Legend (Note: Jerseys appearing in the table on the left of the page indicate those worn by the cyclist during the particular stage, while those appearing in the table on the right of the page indicate those awarded to the cyclist after the stage.)
Red jersey	Denotes the leader of the general classification	Green jersey	Denotes the leader of the points classification
Blue polka dot jersey	Denotes the leader of the mountains classification	White jersey	Denotes the leader of the combination rider classification

== Stage 12 ==
6 September 2018 — Mondoñedo to Punta de Estaca de Bares, 177.5 km (110.3 mi)

Stage 12 result
Rank	Rider	Team	Time
1	Alexandre Geniez (FRA)	AG2R La Mondiale	4h 22' 59"
2	Dylan van Baarle (NED)	Team Sky	s.t.
3	Mark Padun (UKR)	Bahrain–Merida	s.t.
4	Dylan Teuns (BEL)	BMC Racing Team	s.t.
5	Victor Campenaerts (BEL)	Lotto–Soudal	+ 2"
6	Davide Formolo (ITA)	Bora–Hansgrohe	+ 5"
7	Gianluca Brambilla (ITA)	Trek–Segafredo	+ 24"
8	Dries Devenyns (BEL)	Quick-Step Floors	+ 48"
9	Thomas De Gendt (BEL)	Lotto–Soudal	+ 2' 27"
10	Valerio Conti (ITA)	UAE Team Emirates	+ 2' 29"

General classification after stage 12
Rank	Rider	Team	Time
1	Jesús Herrada (ESP)	Cofidis	50h 28' 56"
2	Simon Yates (GBR)	Mitchelton–Scott	+ 3' 22"
3	Alejandro Valverde (ESP)	Movistar Team	+ 3' 23"
4	Nairo Quintana (COL)	Movistar Team	+ 3' 34"
5	Ion Izagirre (ESP)	Bahrain–Merida	+ 3' 39"
6	Tony Gallopin (FRA)	AG2R La Mondiale	+ 3' 46"
7	Emanuel Buchmann (GER)	Bora–Hansgrohe	+ 3' 46"
8	Miguel Ángel López (COL)	Astana	+ 3' 49"
9	Rigoberto Urán (COL)	EF Education First–Drapac	+ 3' 54"
10	Steven Kruijswijk (NED)	LottoNL–Jumbo	+ 4' 05"

== Stage 13 ==
7 September 2018 — Candás to La Camperona, 175.5 km (109.1 mi)

Stage 13 result
Rank	Rider	Team	Time
1	Óscar Rodríguez (ESP)	Euskadi-Murias	4h 17' 05"
2	Rafał Majka (POL)	Bora–Hansgrohe	+ 19"
3	Dylan Teuns (BEL)	BMC Racing Team	+ 30"
4	Bjorg Lambrecht (BEL)	Lotto–Soudal	+ 38"
5	Laurens De Plus (BEL)	Quick-Step Floors	+ 43"
6	Merhawi Kudus (ERI)	Team Dimension Data	+ 1' 00"
7	Ilnur Zakarin (RUS)	Team Katusha–Alpecin	+ 1' 12"
8	Pieter Serry (BEL)	Quick-Step Floors	+ 1' 21"
9	Edward Ravasi (ITA)	UAE Team Emirates	+ 1' 25"
10	Ben King (USA)	Team Dimension Data	+ 1' 27"

General classification after stage 13
Rank	Rider	Team	Time
1	Jesús Herrada (ESP)	Cofidis	54h 50' 19"
2	Simon Yates (GBR)	Mitchelton–Scott	+ 1' 42"
3	Nairo Quintana (COL)	Movistar Team	+ 1' 50"
4	Alejandro Valverde (ESP)	Movistar Team	+ 1' 54"
5	Miguel Ángel López (COL)	Astana	+ 2' 23"
6	Rigoberto Urán (COL)	EF Education First–Drapac	+ 2' 33"
7	Ion Izagirre (ESP)	Bahrain–Merida	+ 2' 35"
8	Tony Gallopin (FRA)	AG2R La Mondiale	+ 2' 40"
9	Steven Kruijswijk (NED)	LottoNL–Jumbo	+ 2' 44"
10	Emanuel Buchmann (GER)	Bora–Hansgrohe	+ 2' 47"

== Stage 14 ==
8 September 2018 — Cistierna to Les Praeres de Nava, 167 km (104 mi)

Stage 14 result
Rank	Rider	Team	Time
1	Simon Yates (GBR)	Mitchelton–Scott	4h 19' 27"
2	Miguel Ángel López (COL)	Astana	+ 2"
3	Alejandro Valverde (ESP)	Movistar Team	+ 2"
4	Thibaut Pinot (FRA)	Groupama–FDJ	+ 5"
5	Nairo Quintana (COL)	Movistar Team	+ 7"
6	Steven Kruijswijk (NED)	LottoNL–Jumbo	+ 11"
7	Enric Mas (ESP)	Quick-Step Floors	+ 19"
8	Rigoberto Urán (COL)	EF Education First–Drapac	+ 27"
9	Ion Izagirre (ESP)	Bahrain–Merida	+ 37"
10	Fabio Aru (ITA)	UAE Team Emirates	+ 39"

General classification after stage 14
Rank	Rider	Team	Time
1	Simon Yates (GBR)	Mitchelton–Scott	59h 11' 18"
2	Alejandro Valverde (ESP)	Movistar Team	+ 20"
3	Nairo Quintana (COL)	Movistar Team	+ 25"
4	Miguel Ángel López (COL)	Astana	+ 47"
5	Steven Kruijswijk (NED)	LottoNL–Jumbo	+ 1' 23"
6	Rigoberto Urán (COL)	EF Education First–Drapac	+ 1' 28"
7	Ion Izagirre (ESP)	Bahrain–Merida	+ 1' 40"
8	Enric Mas (ESP)	Quick-Step Floors	+ 1' 47"
9	Tony Gallopin (FRA)	AG2R La Mondiale	+ 1' 55"
10	Emanuel Buchmann (GER)	Bora–Hansgrohe	+ 2' 08"

== Stage 15 ==
9 September 2018 — Ribera de Arriba to Lagos de Covadonga, 185.5 km (115.3 mi)

Stage 15 result
Rank	Rider	Team	Time
1	Thibaut Pinot (FRA)	Groupama–FDJ	5h 01' 49"
2	Miguel Ángel López (COL)	Astana	+ 28"
3	Simon Yates (GBR)	Mitchelton–Scott	+ 30"
4	Alejandro Valverde (ESP)	Movistar Team	+ 32"
5	Steven Kruijswijk (NED)	LottoNL–Jumbo	+ 32"
6	Enric Mas (ESP)	Quick-Step Floors	+ 34"
7	Nairo Quintana (COL)	Movistar Team	+ 34"
8	Rigoberto Urán (COL)	EF Education First–Drapac	+ 1' 25"
9	Emanuel Buchmann (GER)	Bora–Hansgrohe	+ 1' 33"
10	Ion Izagirre (ESP)	Bahrain–Merida	+ 1' 49"

General classification after stage 15
Rank	Rider	Team	Time
1	Simon Yates (GBR)	Mitchelton–Scott	59h 11' 18"
2	Alejandro Valverde (ESP)	Movistar Team	+ 26"
3	Nairo Quintana (COL)	Movistar Team	+ 33"
4	Miguel Ángel López (COL)	Astana	+ 43"
5	Steven Kruijswijk (NED)	LottoNL–Jumbo	+ 1' 29"
6	Enric Mas (ESP)	Quick-Step Floors	+ 1' 55"
7	Thibaut Pinot (FRA)	Groupama–FDJ	+ 2' 10"
8	Rigoberto Urán (COL)	EF Education First–Drapac	+ 2' 27"
9	Ion Izagirre (ESP)	Bahrain–Merida	+ 3' 03"
10	Emanuel Buchmann (GER)	Bora–Hansgrohe	+ 3' 15"

== Rest day 2 ==
10 September 2018 — Santander

== Stage 16 ==
11 September 2018 — Santillana del Mar to Torrelavega, 32.7 km (20.3 mi) (ITT)

Rohan Dennis retired from the race after his win on Stage 16 to focus on the 2018 World Championships.

Stage 16 result
Rank	Rider	Team	Time
1	Rohan Dennis (AUS)	BMC Racing Team	37' 57"
2	Joey Rosskopf (USA)	BMC Racing Team	+ 50"
3	Jonathan Castroviejo (ESP)	Team Sky	+ 50"
4	Steven Kruijswijk (NED)	LottoNL–Jumbo	+ 51"
5	Michał Kwiatkowski (POL)	Team Sky	+ 51"
6	Enric Mas (ESP)	Quick-Step Floors	+ 1' 03"
7	Nelson Oliveira (POR)	Movistar Team	+ 1' 05"
8	Laurens De Plus (BEL)	Quick-Step Floors	+ 1' 07"
9	Simon Geschke (GER)	Team Sunweb	+ 1' 10"
10	Kasper Asgreen (DEN)	Quick-Step Floors	+ 1' 10"

General classification after stage 16
Rank	Rider	Team	Time
1	Simon Yates (GBR)	Mitchelton–Scott	64h 52' 58"
2	Alejandro Valverde (ESP)	Movistar Team	+ 33"
3	Steven Kruijswijk (NED)	LottoNL–Jumbo	+ 52"
4	Nairo Quintana (COL)	Movistar Team	+ 1' 15"
5	Enric Mas (ESP)	Quick-Step Floors	+ 1' 30"
6	Miguel Ángel López (COL)	Astana	+ 1' 34"
7	Thibaut Pinot (FRA)	Groupama–FDJ	+ 2' 53"
8	Ion Izagirre (ESP)	Bahrain–Merida	+ 3' 04"
9	Rigoberto Urán (COL)	EF Education First–Drapac	+ 3' 15"
10	Tony Gallopin (FRA)	AG2R La Mondiale	+ 4' 43"

== Stage 17 ==
12 September 2018 — Getxo to Oiz, 166.4 km (103.4 mi)

Stage 17 result
Rank	Rider	Team	Time
1	Michael Woods (CAN)	EF Education First–Drapac	4h 09' 48"
2	Dylan Teuns (BEL)	BMC Racing Team	+ 5"
3	David de la Cruz (ESP)	Team Sky	+ 10"
4	Rafał Majka (POL)	Bora–Hansgrohe	+ 13"
5	Ilnur Zakarin (RUS)	Team Katusha–Alpecin	+ 38"
6	Alessandro De Marchi (ITA)	BMC Racing Team	+ 44"
7	Amanuel Ghebreigzabhier (ERI)	Team Dimension Data	+ 48"
8	Jesús Herrada (ESP)	Cofidis	+ 51"
9	Jai Hindley (AUS)	Team Sunweb	+ 55"
10	Vincenzo Nibali (ITA)	Bahrain–Merida	+ 1' 48"

General classification after stage 17
Rank	Rider	Team	Time
1	Simon Yates (GBR)	Mitchelton–Scott	69h 05' 34"
2	Alejandro Valverde (ESP)	Movistar Team	+ 25"
3	Enric Mas (ESP)	Quick-Step Floors	+ 1' 22"
4	Miguel Ángel López (COL)	Astana	+ 1' 36"
5	Steven Kruijswijk (NED)	LottoNL–Jumbo	+ 1' 48"
6	Nairo Quintana (COL)	Movistar Team	+ 2' 11"
7	Ion Izagirre (ESP)	Bahrain–Merida	+ 4' 09"
8	Rigoberto Urán (COL)	EF Education First–Drapac	+ 4' 36"
9	Thibaut Pinot (FRA)	Groupama–FDJ	+ 5' 31"
10	Tony Gallopin (FRA)	AG2R La Mondiale	+ 6' 05"

== Stage 18 ==
13 September 2018 — Ejea de los Caballeros to Lleida, 180.5 km (112.2 mi)

Stage 18 result
Rank	Rider	Team	Time
1	Jelle Wallays (BEL)	Lotto–Soudal	3h 57' 03"
2	Sven Erik Bystrøm (NOR)	UAE Team Emirates	s.t.
3	Peter Sagan (SVK)	Bora–Hansgrohe	s.t.
4	Elia Viviani (ITA)	Quick-Step Floors	s.t.
5	Iván García (ESP)	Bahrain–Merida	s.t.
6	Danny van Poppel (NED)	LottoNL–Jumbo	s.t.
7	Jon Aberasturi (ESP)	Euskadi–Murias	s.t.
8	Tom Van Asbroeck (BEL)	EF Education First–Drapac	s.t.
9	Giacomo Nizzolo (ITA)	Trek–Segafredo	s.t.
10	Ryan Gibbons (RSA)	Team Dimension Data	s.t.

General classification after stage 18
Rank	Rider	Team	Time
1	Simon Yates (GBR)	Mitchelton–Scott	73h 02' 37"
2	Alejandro Valverde (ESP)	Movistar Team	+ 25"
3	Enric Mas (ESP)	Quick-Step Floors	+ 1' 22"
4	Miguel Ángel López (COL)	Astana	+ 1' 36"
5	Steven Kruijswijk (NED)	LottoNL–Jumbo	+ 1' 48"
6	Nairo Quintana (COL)	Movistar Team	+ 2' 11"
7	Ion Izagirre (ESP)	Bahrain–Merida	+ 4' 09"
8	Rigoberto Urán (COL)	EF Education First–Drapac	+ 4' 36"
9	Thibaut Pinot (FRA)	Groupama–FDJ	+ 5' 31"
10	Tony Gallopin (FRA)	AG2R La Mondiale	+ 6' 05"

== Stage 19 ==
14 September 2018 — Lleida to Naturlandia, 157 km (98 mi)

Stage 19 result
Rank	Rider	Team	Time
1	Thibaut Pinot (FRA)	Groupama–FDJ	3h 42' 05"
2	Simon Yates (GBR)	Mitchelton–Scott	+ 5"
3	Steven Kruijswijk (NED)	LottoNL–Jumbo	+ 13"
4	Rigoberto Urán (COL)	EF Education First–Drapac	+ 52"
5	Miguel Ángel López (COL)	Astana	+ 52"
6	Enric Mas (ESP)	Quick-Step Floors	+ 52"
7	Wilco Kelderman (NED)	Team Sunweb	+ 1' 03"
8	Alejandro Valverde (ESP)	Movistar Team	+ 1' 12"
9	Tony Gallopin (FRA)	AG2R La Mondiale	+ 1' 15"
10	Nairo Quintana (COL)	Movistar Team	+ 1' 49"

General classification after stage 19
Rank	Rider	Team	Time
1	Simon Yates (GBR)	Mitchelton–Scott	76h 44' 41"
2	Alejandro Valverde (ESP)	Movistar Team	+ 1' 38"
3	Steven Kruijswijk (NED)	LottoNL–Jumbo	+ 1' 58"
4	Enric Mas (ESP)	Quick-Step Floors	+ 2' 15"
5	Miguel Ángel López (COL)	Astana	+ 2' 29"
6	Nairo Quintana (COL)	Movistar Team	+ 4' 01"
7	Thibaut Pinot (FRA)	Groupama–FDJ	+ 5' 22"
8	Rigoberto Urán (COL)	EF Education First–Drapac	+ 5' 29"
9	Ion Izagirre (ESP)	Bahrain–Merida	+ 6' 30"
10	Tony Gallopin (FRA)	AG2R La Mondiale	+ 7' 21"

== Stage 20 ==
15 September 2018 — Escaldes-Engordany to Coll de la Gallina, 105.8 km (65.7 mi)

Stage 20 result
Rank	Rider	Team	Time
1	Enric Mas (ESP)	Quick-Step Floors	2h 59' 30"
2	Miguel Ángel López (COL)	Astana	s.t.
3	Simon Yates (GBR)	Mitchelton–Scott	+ 23"
4	Thibaut Pinot (FRA)	Groupama–FDJ	+ 54"
5	Rigoberto Urán (COL)	EF Education First–Drapac	+ 57"
6	Wilco Kelderman (NED)	Team Sunweb	+ 1' 11"
7	Steven Kruijswijk (NED)	LottoNL–Jumbo	+ 1' 15"
8	David de la Cruz (ESP)	Team Sky	+ 2' 17"
9	Nairo Quintana (COL)	Movistar Team	+ 3' 09"
10	Alejandro Valverde (ESP)	Movistar Team	+ 3' 09"

General classification after stage 20
Rank	Rider	Team	Time
1	Simon Yates (GBR)	Mitchelton–Scott	79h 44' 30"
2	Enric Mas (ESP)	Quick-Step Floors	+ 1' 46"
3	Miguel Ángel López (COL)	Astana	+ 2' 04"
4	Steven Kruijswijk (NED)	LottoNL–Jumbo	+ 2' 54"
5	Alejandro Valverde (ESP)	Movistar Team	+ 4' 28"
6	Thibaut Pinot (FRA)	Groupama–FDJ	+ 5' 57"
7	Rigoberto Urán (COL)	EF Education First–Drapac	+ 6' 07"
8	Nairo Quintana (COL)	Movistar Team	+ 6' 51"
9	Ion Izagirre (ESP)	Bahrain–Merida	+ 11' 09"
10	Wilco Kelderman (NED)	Team Sunweb	+ 11' 11"

== Stage 21 ==
16 September 2018 — Alcorcón to Madrid, 112.3 km (69.8 mi)

Stage 21 result
Rank	Rider	Team	Time
1	Elia Viviani (ITA)	Quick-Step Floors	2h 21' 28"
2	Peter Sagan (SVK)	Bora–Hansgrohe	s.t.
3	Giacomo Nizzolo (ITA)	Trek–Segafredo	s.t.
4	Danny van Poppel (NED)	LottoNL–Jumbo	s.t.
5	Marc Sarreau (FRA)	Groupama–FDJ	s.t.
6	Jon Aberasturi (ESP)	Euskadi–Murias	s.t.
7	Simone Consonni (ITA)	UAE Team Emirates	s.t.
8	Matteo Trentin (ITA)	Mitchelton–Scott	s.t.
9	Tom Van Asbroeck (BEL)	EF Education First–Drapac	s.t.
10	Ryan Gibbons (RSA)	Team Dimension Data	s.t.

General classification after stage 21
Rank	Rider	Team	Time
1	Simon Yates (GBR)	Mitchelton–Scott	82h 05' 58"
2	Enric Mas (ESP)	Quick-Step Floors	+ 1' 46"
3	Miguel Ángel López (COL)	Astana	+ 2' 04"
4	Steven Kruijswijk (NED)	LottoNL–Jumbo	+ 2' 54"
5	Alejandro Valverde (ESP)	Movistar Team	+ 4' 28"
6	Thibaut Pinot (FRA)	Groupama–FDJ	+ 5' 57"
7	Rigoberto Urán (COL)	EF Education First–Drapac	+ 6' 07"
8	Nairo Quintana (COL)	Movistar Team	+ 6' 51"
9	Ion Izagirre (ESP)	Bahrain–Merida	+ 11' 09"
10	Wilco Kelderman (NED)	Team Sunweb	+ 11' 11"
