= 2018 Vuelta a España =

73rd edition of the Vuelta a España

2018 UCI World Tour, race 31 of 37

Race details
- Dates: 25 August – 16 September
- Stages: 21
- Distance: 3,271.4 km (2,032.8 mi)
- Winning time: 82h 05' 58"

Results
Jersey awarded to the overall winner	Winner	Simon Yates (GBR)	(Mitchelton–Scott)
	Second	Enric Mas (ESP)	(Quick-Step Floors)
	Third	Miguel Ángel López (COL)	(Astana)
Jersey awarded to the points classification winner	Points	Alejandro Valverde (ESP)	(Movistar Team)
Jersey awarded to the mountains classification winner	Mountains	Thomas De Gendt (BEL)	(Lotto–Soudal)
Jersey awarded to the young rider classification winner	Young rider	Enric Mas (ESP)	(Quick-Step Floors)
Jersey awarded to the combination classification winner	Combination	Simon Yates (GBR)	(Mitchelton–Scott)
Jersey awarded to the combativity classification winner	Combativity	Bauke Mollema (NED)	(Trek–Segafredo)
	Team	(Spain) Movistar Team	

The 2018 Vuelta a España was a three-week Grand Tour cycling stage race that took place in Spain between 25 August and 16 September 2018. The race was the 73rd edition of the Vuelta a España and was the final Grand Tour of the 2018 cycling season. The race started in Málaga and finished in Madrid.

The race was won by British rider Simon Yates from the team Mitchelton–Scott.

== Teams ==
The starting teams include:

UCI WorldTeams

- AG2R La Mondiale
- Astana
- Bahrain–Merida
- BMC Racing Team
- Bora–Hansgrohe
- Team Dimension Data
- EF Education First–Drapac p/b Cannondale
- Team Katusha–Alpecin
- Lotto–Soudal
- LottoNL–Jumbo
- Mitchelton–Scott
- Movistar Team
- Quick-Step Floors
- Team Sky
- Team Sunweb
- Trek–Segafredo
- UAE Team Emirates
- Groupama–FDJ

Professional Continental teams

- Burgos BH
- Caja Rural–Seguros RGA
- Cofidis
- Euskadi–Murias

== Pre-race favourites ==
Four former winners started the race; Nairo Quintana, Alejandro Valverde (both from Movistar Team), Vincenzo Nibali (Bahrain–Merida) and Fabio Aru (UAE Team Emirates). The other riders considered contenders for the general classification were Richie Porte (BMC Racing Team), Simon Yates (Mitchelton–Scott), Miguel Ángel López (Astana), Michał Kwiatkowski (Team Sky), Wilco Kelderman (Team Sunweb), Steven Kruijswijk (LottoNL–Jumbo), Thibaut Pinot (Groupama–FDJ) and Rigoberto Urán (EF Education First–Drapac p/b Cannondale).

== Route ==
Stage characteristics and winners
Stage	Date	Course	Distance	Type	Winner
1	25 August	Málaga	8 km (5 mi)	Individual time trial	Rohan Dennis (AUS)
2	26 August	Marbella to Caminito del Rey	163.9 km (102 mi)	Hilly stage	Alejandro Valverde (ESP)
3	27 August	Mijas to Alhaurín de la Torre	182.5 km (113 mi)	Hilly stage	Elia Viviani (ITA)
4	28 August	Vélez-Málaga to Alfacar	162 km (101 mi)	Mountain stage	Ben King (USA)
5	29 August	Granada to Roquetas de Mar	188 km (117 mi)	Intermediate stage	Simon Clarke (AUS)
6	30 August	Huércal-Overa to San Javier	153 km (95 mi)	Flat stage	Nacer Bouhanni (FRA)
7	31 August	Puerto Lumbreras to Pozo Alcón	182 km (113 mi)	Hilly stage	Tony Gallopin (FRA)
8	1 September	Linares to Almadén	195.5 km (121 mi)	Hilly stage	Alejandro Valverde (ESP)
9	2 September	Talavera de la Reina to La Covatilla	195 km (121 mi)	Mountain stage	Ben King (USA)
	3 September	Salamanca	Rest day		
10	4 September	Salamanca to Fermoselle	172.5 km (107 mi)	Flat stage	Elia Viviani (ITA)
11	5 September	Mombuey to Ribeira Sacra/Luíntra	208.8 km (130 mi)	Intermediate stage	Alessandro De Marchi (ITA)
12	6 September	Mondoñedo to Punta de Estaca de Bares	177.5 km (110 mi)	Hilly stage	Alexandre Geniez (FRA)
13	7 September	Candás to La Camperona	175.5 km (109 mi)	Mountain stage	Óscar Rodríguez (ESP)
14	8 September	Cistierna to Les Praeres de Nava	167 km (104 mi)	Mountain stage	Simon Yates (GBR)
15	9 September	Ribera de Arriba to Lakes of Covadonga	185.5 km (115 mi)	Mountain stage	Thibaut Pinot (FRA)
	10 September	Santander	Rest day		
16	11 September	Santillana del Mar to Torrelavega	32.7 km (20 mi)	Individual time trial	Rohan Dennis (AUS)
17	12 September	Getxo to Oiz	166.4 km (103 mi)	Intermediate stage	Michael Woods (CAN)
18	13 September	Ejea de los Caballeros to Lleida	180.5 km (112 mi)	Flat stage	Jelle Wallays (BEL)
19	14 September	Lleida to Naturlandia (Andorra)	157 km (98 mi)	Mountain stage	Thibaut Pinot (FRA)
20	15 September	Escaldes-Engordany (Andorra) to Coll de la Gallina (Andorra)	105.8 km (66 mi)	Mountain stage	Enric Mas (ESP)
21	16 September	Alcorcón to Madrid	112.3 km (70 mi)	Flat stage	Elia Viviani (ITA)
Total			3,271.4 km (2,033 mi)		

== Classification leadership ==
The Vuelta a España had four individual classifications, for which jerseys were awarded daily to the leading rider, as well as a team competition. The primary classification was the general classification, which was calculated by adding each rider's finishing times on each stage. Time bonuses were awarded at the end of every stage apart from the two individual time trials. The rider with the lowest cumulative time was the leader of the general classification, and wears the red jersey. The leader of the general classification at the end of the race was considered the overall winner of the Vuelta a España.

The second classification was the points classification. Riders received points for finishing among the highest placed in a stage finish, or in intermediate sprints during the stage. The points available for each stage finish were determined by the stage's type. The leader was identified by a green jersey.

Mountains classification points
Category	1st	2nd	3rd	4th	5th	6th
Cima Alberto Fernández	20	15	10	6	4	2
Special-category	15	10	6	4	2	
First-category	10	6	4	2	1	
Second-category	5	3	1			
Third-category	3	2	1			

The next classification was the mountains classification. Points were awarded to the riders that reached the summit of the most difficult climbs first. The climbs were categorized, in order of increasing difficulty, third-, second-, and first- and special-category. The leader wore a white jersey with blue polka dots.

The final of the individual classifications was the combination classification. A rider's ranking in the combination classification was determined by tallying up his positions in the general, points, and mountains classifications. The leader wore a white jersey. If no rider was classified in all three classifications, riders classified in two would have been considered, and if that was tied the general classification will decide the winner.

There was also the team classification. After each stage, the times of the three highest finishers of each team are added together. The victory was awarded to the team with the lowest cumulative time at the end of the event.

In addition, there were two individual awards: the combativity award and the young rider award. The combativity award was given after each stage to the rider "who displayed the most generous effort and best sporting spirit." The daily winner wore a green number bib the following stage. At the end of the Vuelta, a jury decides the top three riders for the "Most Combative Rider of La Vuelta", with a public vote deciding the victor. The young rider award is calculated the same way as the general classification, but the classification was restricted to riders who were born on or after 1 January 1993. The leader wore a red number bib.

A total of €1,120,000 will be awarded in cash prizes in the race. The overall winner of the general classification will receive €150,335, with the second and third placed riders getting €57,000 and €30,000 respectively. All finishers in the top 20 were awarded with money. The holders of the four individual classifications benefited on each stage they led. The final winners of the points and combined were given €11,000, while the mountains classification got €23,100 and the most combative rider got €3,000. The team classification winners were given €12,500. €11,000 was given to the winners of each stage of the race, with smaller amounts given to places 2–20. There was also a special award with a prize of €1,000, the Cima Alberto Fernández, given to first rider to reach the summit of the highest mountain of the race.

Classification leadership by stage
Stage	Winner	General classification	Points classification	Mountains classification	Combination classification	Team classification	Combativity award	Young rider award
1	Rohan Dennis	Rohan Dennis	Rohan Dennis (Note: In stage 2, Victor Campenaerts, who was third in the points and general classifications, wore the green jersey, because first-placed Rohan Dennis wore the red jersey as leader of the general classification; Michał Kwiatkowski, who was second in the general and points classifications, elected to wear his Polish national champion's jersey. Nelson Oliveira, who was fourth in the general and points classifications, wore the white with blue polka-dot jersey in stage 2, although no points were awarded during the opening individual time trial stage. Dylan van Baarle, who was fifth in the general and points classifications, therefore wore the white combination classification jersey.)	not awarded	Rohan Dennis	BMC Racing Team	not awarded	Benjamin Thomas
2	Alejandro Valverde	Michał Kwiatkowski	Michał Kwiatkowski (Note: In stages 3 to 5, Alejandro Valverde, who was second in the points classification, wore the green jersey, because first-placed Michał Kwiatkowski wore the red jersey as leader of the general classification. As a result, the white jersey was worn by the third-placed rider in the combination classification; in stages 3 and 4, this was worn by Laurens De Plus, while Ben King wore the jersey on stage 5.)	Luis Ángel Maté	Michał Kwiatkowski	Team Sky	Luis Ángel Maté	Laurens De Plus
3	Elia Viviani	Michał Kwiatkowski	Michał Kwiatkowski	Luis Ángel Maté	Michał Kwiatkowski	Team Sky	Jordi Simón	Laurens De Plus
4	Ben King	Michał Kwiatkowski	Michał Kwiatkowski	Luis Ángel Maté	Michał Kwiatkowski	Astana	Luis Ángel Maté	Enric Mas
5	Simon Clarke	Rudy Molard	Michał Kwiatkowski	Luis Ángel Maté	Alejandro Valverde	Astana	Bauke Mollema	Enric Mas
6	Nacer Bouhanni	Rudy Molard	Michał Kwiatkowski	Luis Ángel Maté	Michał Kwiatkowski (Note: In stage 7, Alejandro Valverde, who was second in the combination classification, wore the white jersey, because first-placed Michał Kwiatkowski wore the green jersey as leader of the points classification.)	Astana	Jorge Cubero	Enric Mas
7	Tony Gallopin	Rudy Molard	Alejandro Valverde	Luis Ángel Maté	Alejandro Valverde (Note: In stages 8 and 9, Ben King, who was third in the combination classification, wore the white jersey, because first-placed Alejandro Valverde wore the green jersey as leader of the points classification; Michał Kwiatkowski, who was second in the combination classification, elected to wear his Polish national champion's jersey. King also wore the jersey on stages 10, and 12 to 14, having moved up to second in the combination classification after his stage 9 victory. In stages 15 and 17, Miguel Ángel López, who was third in the combination classification, wore the white jersey, because first-placed Alejandro Valverde wore the green jersey as leader of the points classification; Simon Yates, who was second in the combination classification, wore the red jersey as leader of the general classification. López also wore the jersey on stages 16, 18 and 19, having moved up to second in the combination classification behind Valverde.)	Astana	Alex Aranburu	Enric Mas
8	Alejandro Valverde	Rudy Molard	Alejandro Valverde	Luis Ángel Maté	Alejandro Valverde	Astana	Jorge Cubero	Enric Mas
9	Ben King	Simon Yates	Alejandro Valverde	Luis Ángel Maté	Alejandro Valverde	LottoNL–Jumbo	Lluís Mas	Miguel Ángel López
10	Elia Viviani	Simon Yates	Peter Sagan	Luis Ángel Maté	Alejandro Valverde	LottoNL–Jumbo	Jesús Ezquerra	Miguel Ángel López
11	Alessandro De Marchi	Simon Yates	Alejandro Valverde	Luis Ángel Maté	Alejandro Valverde	LottoNL–Jumbo	Bauke Mollema	Miguel Ángel López
12	Alexandre Geniez	Jesús Herrada	Alejandro Valverde	Luis Ángel Maté	Alejandro Valverde	Bahrain–Merida	Thomas De Gendt	Miguel Ángel López
13	Óscar Rodríguez	Jesús Herrada	Alejandro Valverde	Luis Ángel Maté	Alejandro Valverde	Bahrain–Merida	Gorka Izagirre	Miguel Ángel López
14	Simon Yates	Simon Yates	Alejandro Valverde	Luis Ángel Maté	Alejandro Valverde	Bahrain–Merida	Michał Kwiatkowski	Miguel Ángel López
15	Thibaut Pinot	Simon Yates	Alejandro Valverde	Luis Ángel Maté	Alejandro Valverde	Bahrain–Merida	Bauke Mollema	Miguel Ángel López
16	Rohan Dennis	Simon Yates	Alejandro Valverde	Luis Ángel Maté	Alejandro Valverde	Movistar Team	not awarded	Enric Mas
17	Michael Woods	Simon Yates	Alejandro Valverde	Thomas De Gendt	Alejandro Valverde	Movistar Team	Omar Fraile	Enric Mas
18	Jelle Wallays	Simon Yates	Alejandro Valverde	Thomas De Gendt	Alejandro Valverde	Movistar Team	Jetse Bol	Enric Mas
19	Thibaut Pinot	Simon Yates	Alejandro Valverde	Thomas De Gendt	Simon Yates (Note: In stage 20, Miguel Ángel López, who was third in the combination classification, wore the white jersey, because first-placed Simon Yates wore the red jersey as leader of the general classification; Alejandro Valverde, who was second in the combination classification, wore the green jersey as leader of the points classification. López also wore the jersey on stage 21, having moved up to second in the combination classification behind Yates.)	Movistar Team	Jonathan Castroviejo	Enric Mas
20	Enric Mas	Simon Yates	Alejandro Valverde	Thomas De Gendt	Simon Yates	Movistar Team	Jesús Herrada	Enric Mas
21	Elia Viviani	Simon Yates	Alejandro Valverde	Thomas De Gendt	Simon Yates	Movistar Team	not awarded	Enric Mas
Final		Simon Yates	Alejandro Valverde	Thomas De Gendt	Simon Yates	Movistar Team	Bauke Mollema	Enric Mas

== Final classification standings ==
Legend
General classification	Denotes the leader of the general classification	Points classification	Denotes the leader of the points classification
Mountains classification	Denotes the leader of the mountains classification	Combination classification	Denotes the leader of the combination classification
A white jersey with a green number bib.	Denotes the winner of the combativity award	A white jersey with a red number bib.	Denotes the winner of the young rider award

=== General classification ===
Final general classification (1–10)
Rank	Rider	Team	Time
1	Simon Yates (GBR)	Mitchelton–Scott	82h 05' 58"
2	Enric Mas (ESP)	Quick-Step Floors	+ 1' 46"
3	Miguel Ángel López (COL)	Astana	+ 2' 04"
4	Steven Kruijswijk (NED)	LottoNL–Jumbo	+ 2' 54"
5	Alejandro Valverde (ESP)	Movistar Team	+ 4' 28"
6	Thibaut Pinot (FRA)	Groupama–FDJ	+ 5' 57"
7	Rigoberto Urán (COL)	EF Education First–Drapac	+ 6' 07"
8	Nairo Quintana (COL)	Movistar Team	+ 6' 51"
9	Ion Izagirre (ESP)	Bahrain–Merida	+ 11' 09"
10	Wilco Kelderman (NED)	Team Sunweb	+ 11' 11"

=== Points classification ===
Final points classification (1–10)
Rank	Rider	Team	Points
1	Alejandro Valverde (ESP)	Movistar Team	131
2	Peter Sagan (SVK)	Bora–Hansgrohe	119
3	Elia Viviani (ITA)	Quick-Step Floors	105
4	Simon Yates (GBR)	Mitchelton–Scott	104
5	Miguel Ángel López (COL)	Astana	103
6	Thibaut Pinot (FRA)	Groupama–FDJ	95
7	Dylan Teuns (BEL)	BMC Racing Team	93
8	Steven Kruijswijk (NED)	LottoNL–Jumbo	80
9	Danny van Poppel (NED)	LottoNL–Jumbo	80
10	Giacomo Nizzolo (ITA)	Trek–Segafredo	76

=== Mountains classification ===
Final mountains classification (1–10)
Rank	Rider	Team	Points
1	Thomas De Gendt (BEL)	Lotto–Soudal	95
2	Bauke Mollema (NED)	Trek–Segafredo	83
3	Luis Ángel Maté (ESP)	Cofidis	64
4	Ben King (USA)	Team Dimension Data	56
5	Miguel Ángel López (COL)	Astana	45
6	Simon Yates (GBR)	Mitchelton–Scott	38
7	Thibaut Pinot (FRA)	Groupama–FDJ	36
8	Pierre Rolland (FRA)	EF Education First–Drapac	31
9	Michael Woods (CAN)	EF Education First–Drapac	21
10	Michał Kwiatkowski (POL)	Team Sky	20

=== Combination classification ===
Final combination classification (1–10)
Rank	Rider	Team	Points
1	Simon Yates (GBR)	Mitchelton–Scott	11
2	Miguel Ángel López (COL)	Astana	13
3	Alejandro Valverde (ESP)	Movistar Team	18
4	Thibaut Pinot (FRA)	Groupama–FDJ	19
5	Enric Mas (ESP)	Quick-Step Floors	24
6	Steven Kruijswijk (NED)	LottoNL–Jumbo	29
7	Ben King (USA)	Team Dimension Data	41
8	Rigoberto Urán (COL)	EF Education First–Drapac	45
9	Nairo Quintana (COL)	Movistar Team	47
10	Rafał Majka (POL)	Bora–Hansgrohe	47

=== Team classification ===
Final team classification (1–10)
Rank	Team	Time
1	(Spain) Movistar Team	246h 50' 04"
2	Bahrain–Merida	+ 45' 36"
3	(Germany) Bora–Hansgrohe	+ 47' 57"
4	(Kazakhstan) Astana	+ 48' 10"
5	(United States) EF Education First–Drapac	+ 58' 49"
6	(Australia) Mitchelton–Scott	+ 1h 27' 43"
7	(South Africa) Team Dimension Data	+ 1h 31' 01"
8	(France) AG2R La Mondiale	+ 1h 37' 13"
9	(United Kingdom) Team Sky	+ 1h 47' 43"
10	(Spain) Euskadi–Murias	+ 1h 47' 50"

== Notes and references ==
=== Sources ===
- Race regulations (PDF). Madrid: Unipublic. 2017. Archived (PDF) from the original on 29 August 2017.
