= La Camperona =

Mountain in Spain

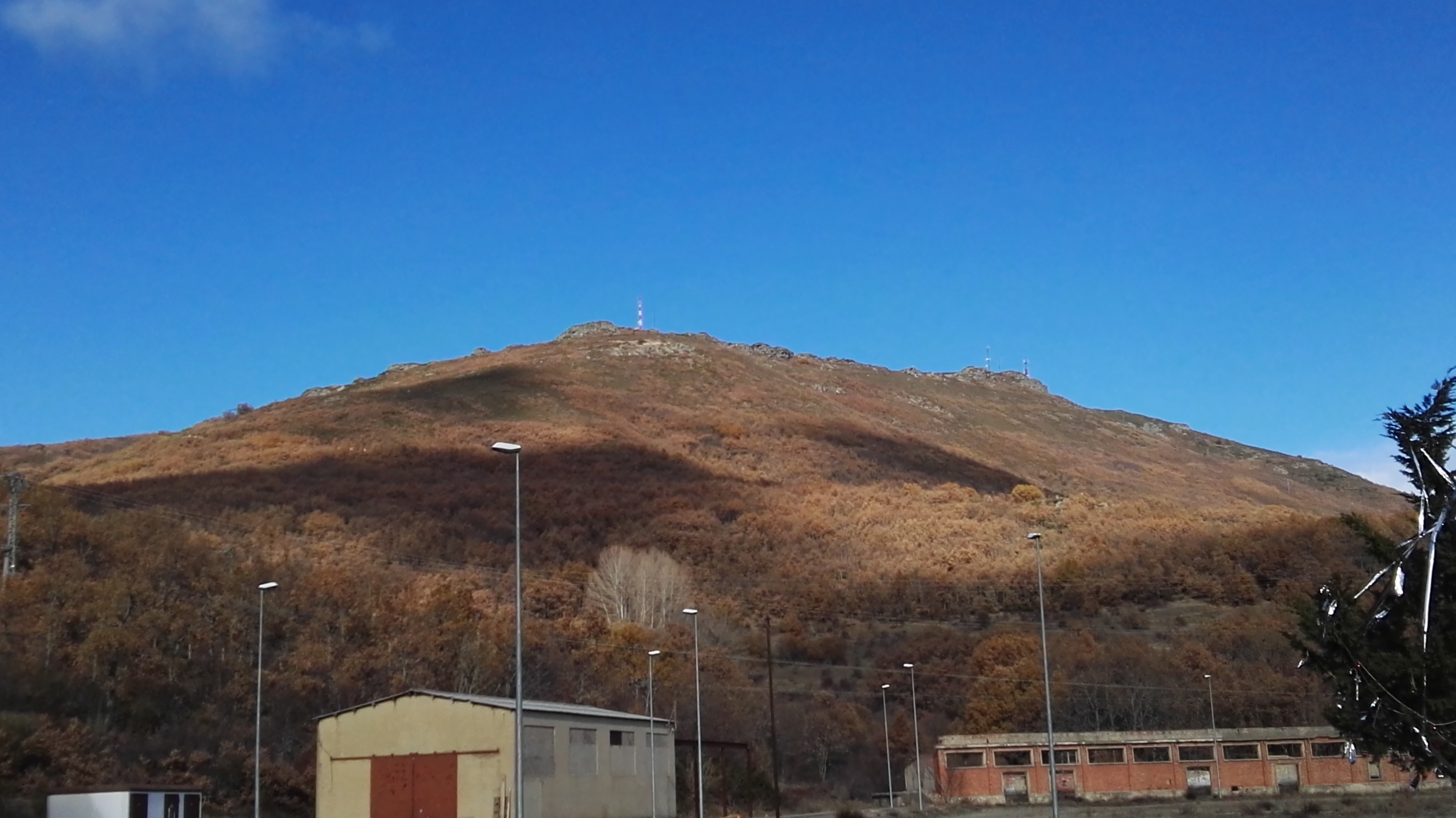
- A view of La Camperona from Sotillos de Sabero

Highest point
- Elevation: 1,597 m (5,240 ft)
- Coordinates: 42°51′12″N 5°11′36″W

Geography
- Location within Spain
- Location: Province of León, Spain
- Parent range: Cantabrian Mountains

La Camperona (altitude 1,597 m (5,240 ft)) is a mountain in the Cantabrian Mountains, near Sabero in the Province of León, Spain.

The mountain pass, which gives access to the summit, has the same name.

== Cycling ==
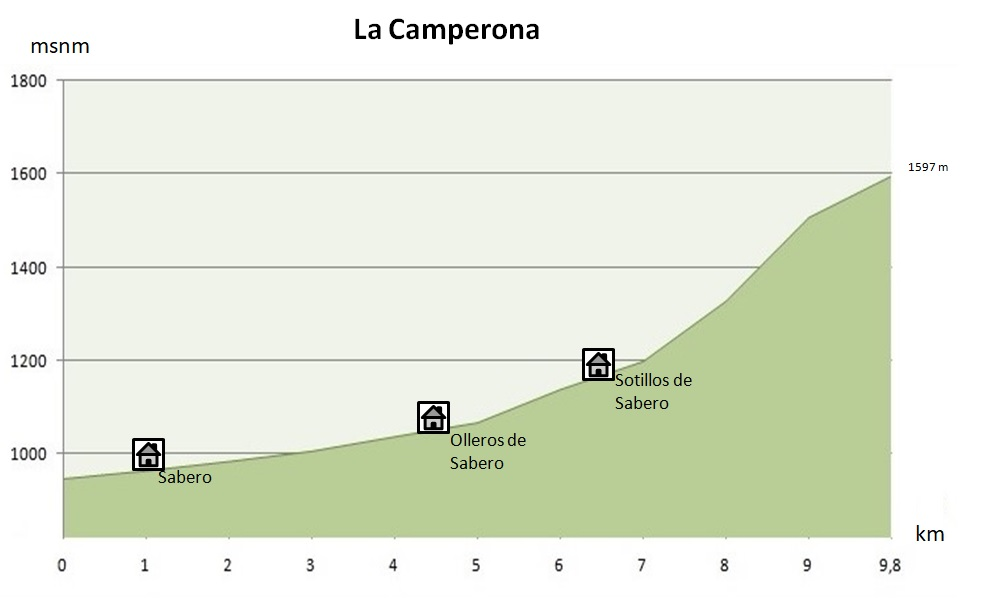
The climb of La Camperona

The mountain has been used several times for stage finishes in the Vuelta a España. The average gradient of the 7.57 km (4.7 mi) climb from the N-621 road at Santa Olaja de la Varga to Sotillos de Sabero at 1,216 m (3,990 ft) is 3.5%, with a maximum gradient of 9%. Beyond Sotillos de Sabero, the climb has a maximum gradient of 19.5%.

Edition	Winner	Leader
2014	Ryder Hesjedal (CAN)	Alberto Contador (ESP)
2016	Sergey Lagutin (RUS)	Nairo Quintana (COL)
2018	Óscar Rodríguez (ESP)	Jesús Herrada (ESP)
