= Pozo Alcón =

Pozo Alcón, Spain
- city
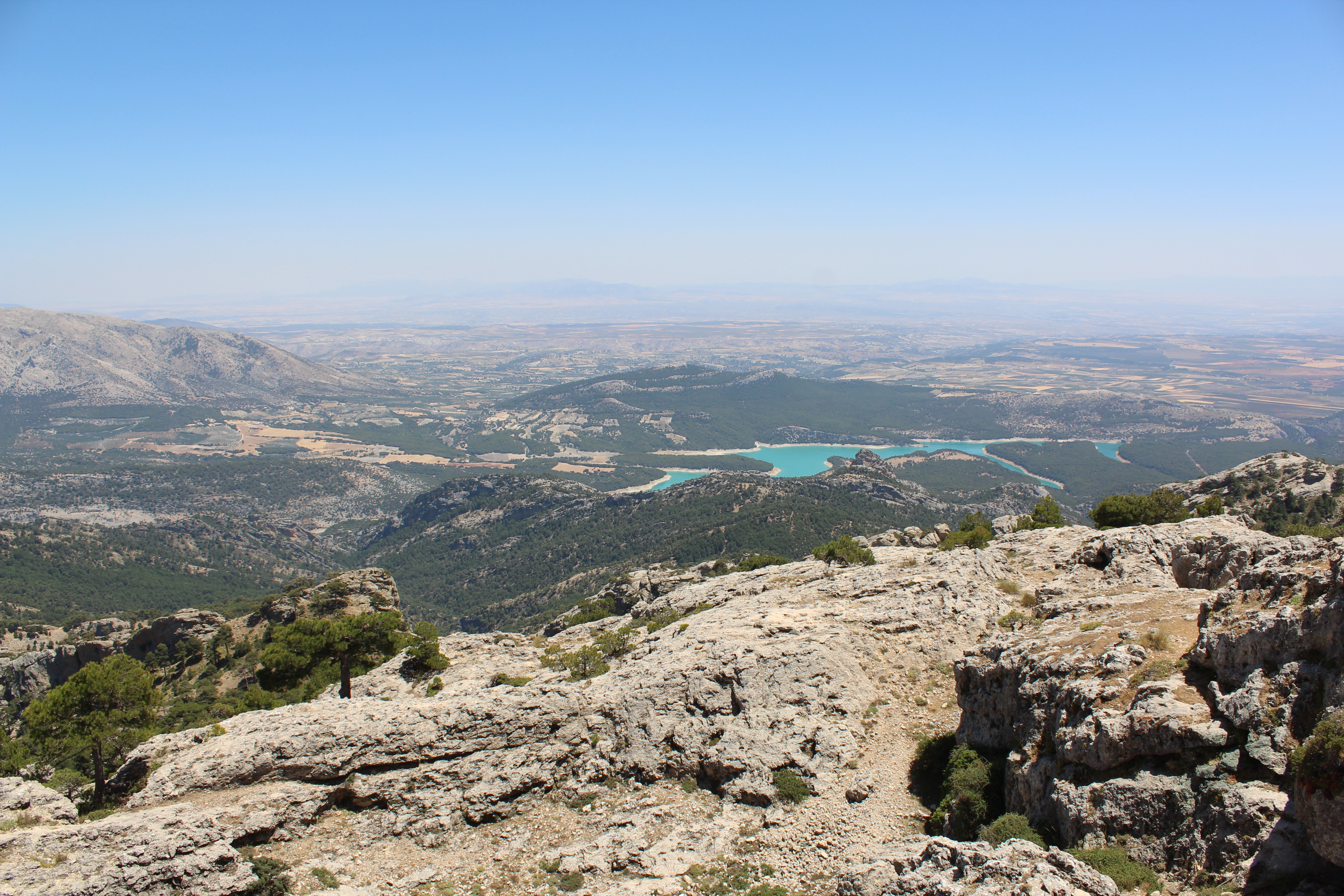

- Flag Coat of arms

- Location in the Province of Jaén Pozo Alcón (Andalusia) Pozo Alcón (Spain)
- Coordinates: 37.704°N 2.935°W
- Country: Spain
- Autonomous community: Andalusia
- Province: Jaén
- Municipality: Pozo Alcón

Area
  - Total: 139 km^{2} (54 sq mi)
- Elevation: 854 m (2,802 ft)

Population (2025-01-01)
  - Total: 4,514
  - Density: 32.5/km^{2} (84.1/sq mi)
- Time zone: UTC+1 (CET)
  - Summer (DST): UTC+2 (CEST)

Pozo Alcón is a city located in the province of Jaén, Spain. According to the 2005 census (INE), the city has a population of 5,437 inhabitants.

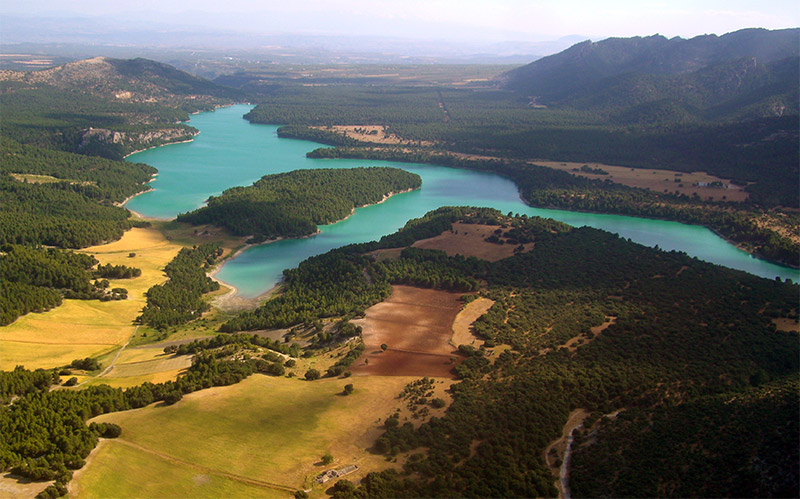
La Bolera Reservoir in Pozo Alcón, Jaén

== See also ==
- List of municipalities in Jaén
