= Mombuey =

- Municipality
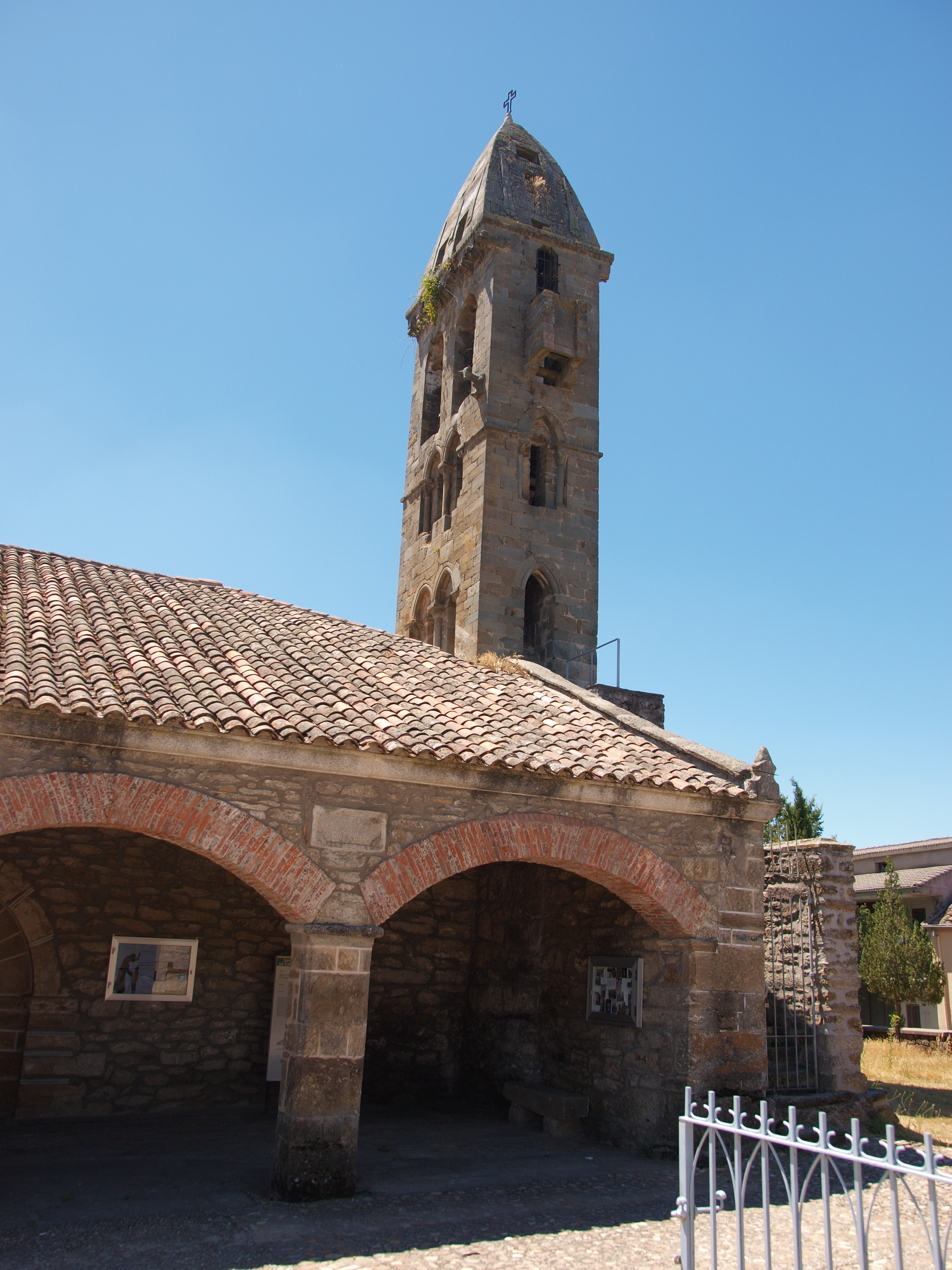

- Location of Mombuey within Spain
- Coordinates: 42°02′N 6°20′W
- Country: Spain
- Autonomous community: Castile and León
- Province: Zamora
- Municipality: Mombuey

Area
  - Total: 38 km^{2} (15 sq mi)

Population (2025-01-01)
  - Total: 395
  - Density: 10/km^{2} (27/sq mi)
- Time zone: UTC+1 (CET)
  - Summer (DST): UTC+2 (CEST)
- Website: Official website

Mombuey is a municipality located in the province of Zamora, Castile and León, Spain. According to the 2004 census (INE), the municipality has a population of 434 inhabitants.
