= Óscar Cabedo =

Spanish cyclist

Personal information
- Full name: Óscar Cabedo Cardá
- Born: 12 November 1994 (age 31) Onda, Spain
- Height: 1.74 m (5 ft 9 in)
- Weight: 53 kg (117 lb)

Cycling career
- Sport: Cycling
- Current team: Feirense–Beeceler
- Discipline: Road
- Role: Rider
- Rider type: Climber

Amateur teams
- 2014–2016: Seguros Bilbao
- 2017: Escribano Sport

Professional teams
- 2018–2022: Burgos BH
- 2023: Team Vorarlberg
- 2024–: ABTF Betão–Feirense

Óscar Cabedo Cardá (born 12 November 1994 in Onda) is a Spanish cyclist, who currently rides for UCI Continental team Feirense–Beeceler. He is the brother of the cyclist Víctor Cabedo who died in 2012. In August 2018, he was named in the startlist for the 2018 Vuelta a España.

== Major results ==
2023
2nd Overall Oberösterreichrundfahrt

=== Grand Tour general classification results timeline ===
Grand Tour	2018	2019	2020	2021	2022
Giro d'Italia	—	—	—	—	—
Tour de France	—	—	—	—	—
Vuelta a España	86	116	63	19	22

Legend
—	Did not compete
DNF	Did not finish
