= Jorge Cubero =

Spanish cyclist (born 1992)

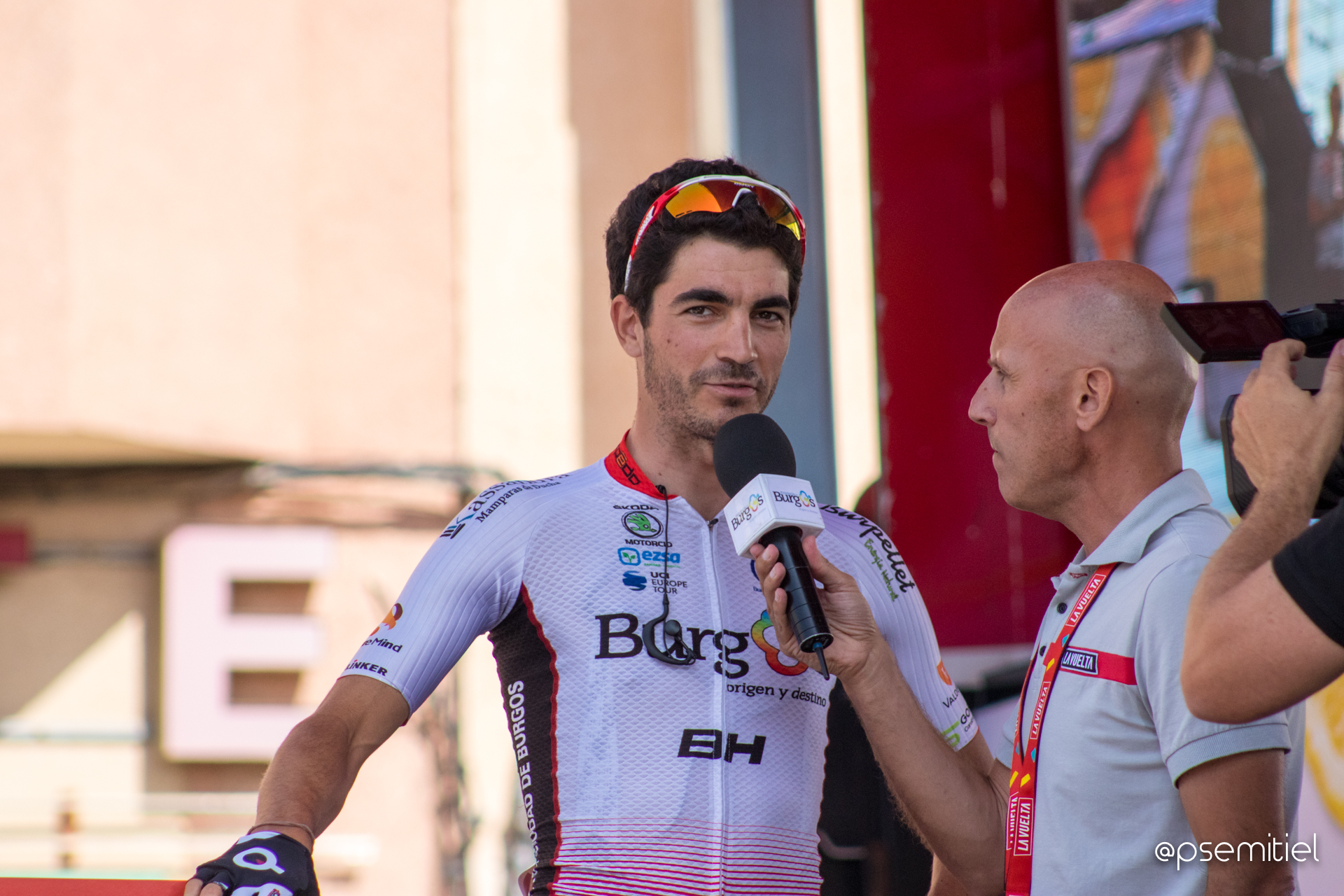
- Cubero at the 2018 Vuelta a España

Personal information
- Full name: Jorge Cubero Gálvez
- Born: 6 November 1992 (age 33) Baena, Spain

Cycling career
- Sport: Cycling
- Current team: Retired
- Discipline: Road
- Role: Rider

Amateur teams
- 2013: Caromar
- 2014–2015: Bicicletas Rodríguez–Extremadura

Professional team
- 2016–2020: Burgos BH

Jorge Cubero Gálvez (born 6 November 1992) is a Spanish former professional cyclist, who rode professionally for UCI ProTeam Burgos Burpellet BH between 2016 and 2020. In August 2018, he was named in the startlist for the Vuelta a España.

After retiring, Cubero intended to pursue a career as a civil engineer.

== Major results ==
2018
Vuelta a España

Combativity award, Stages 6 & 8

2019
Combativity award Stage 4 Vuelta a España

=== Grand Tour general classification results timeline ===
Grand Tour	2018	2019
Giro d'Italia	—	—
Tour de France	—	—
Vuelta a España	89	136

Legend
—	Did not compete
DNF	Did not finish
