= Thierry Bricaud =

French bicycle racer

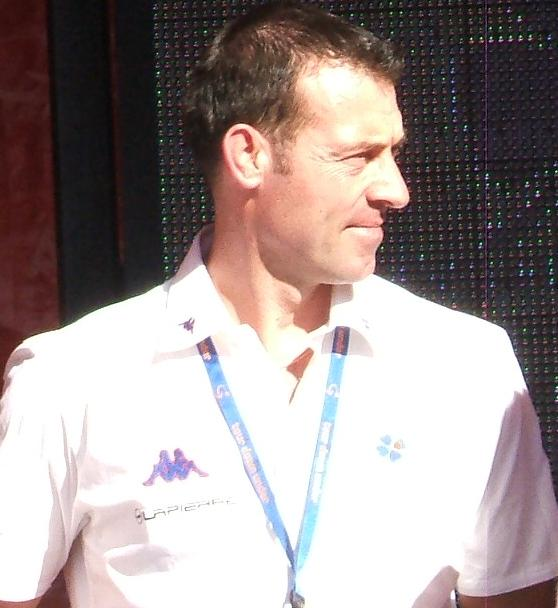
Thierry Bricaud

Thierry Bricaud (born November 8, 1969) is a former French cyclist, who is now a directeur sportif with the Groupama–FDJ cycling team. He won two professional races in his career.

== See also ==
- European Road Championships
- Outline of cycling
- Tour de France
- UEC European Track Championships
