= Ben King (cyclist) =

American racing cyclist (born 1989)

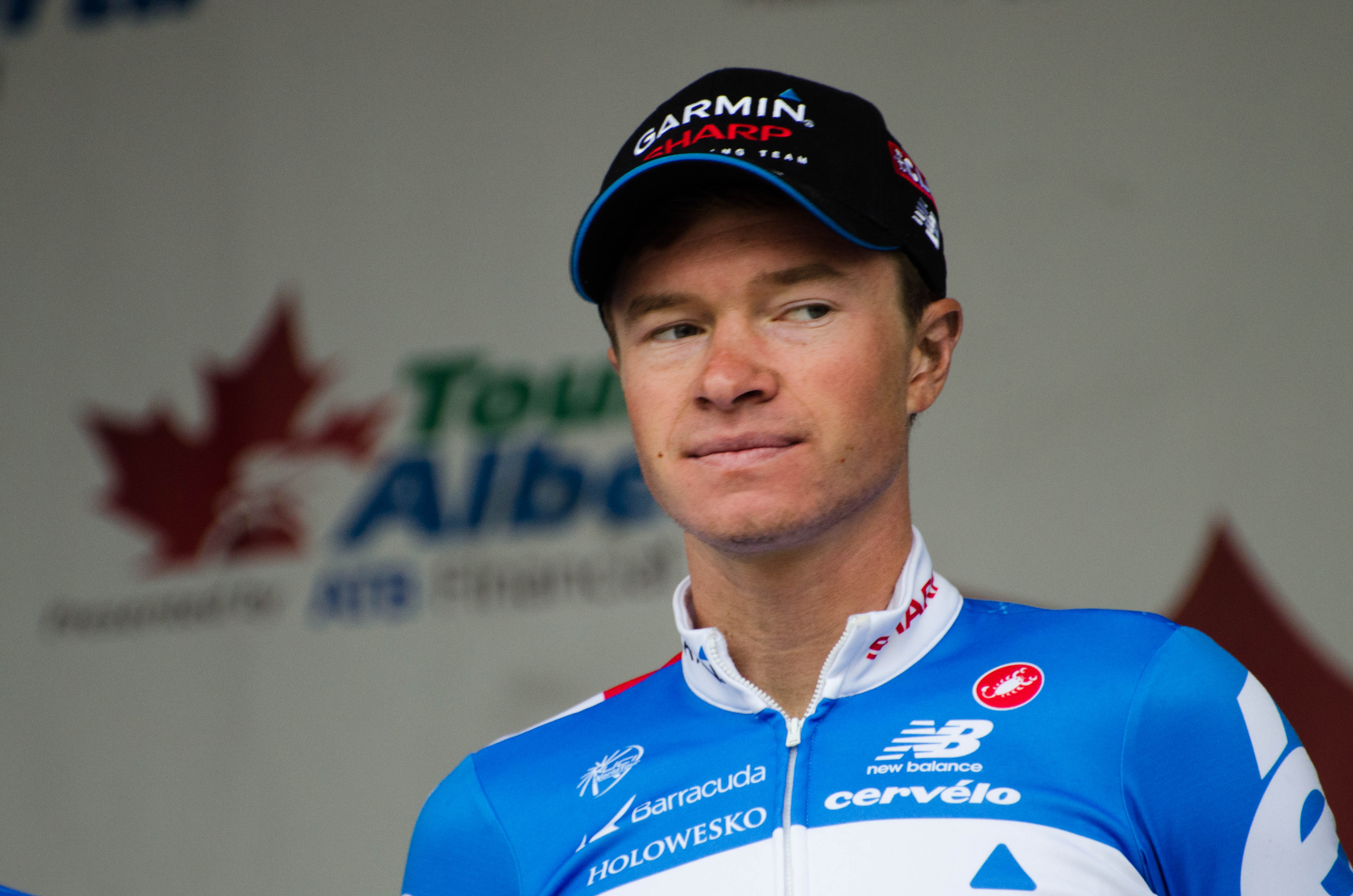
- King at the 2014 Tour of Alberta

Personal information
- Full name: Benjamin T. King
- Born: March 22, 1989 (age 37) Richmond, Virginia, United States
- Height: 1.82 m (6 ft 0 in)
- Weight: 68 kg (150 lb)

Cycling career
- Sport: Cycling
- Discipline: Road
- Role: Rider
- Rider type: Climber; Domestique

Amateur teams
- 2004–2005: Charlottesville Racing Club
- 2006–2007: Hot Tubes Cycling

Professional teams
- 2008: Kelly Benefit Strategies–Medifast
- 2009–2010: Trek–Livestrong
- 2011: Team RadioShack
- 2012–2013: RadioShack–Nissan
- 2014–2016: Garmin–Sharp
- 2017–2020: Team Dimension Data
- 2021–2022: Rally Cycling

Major wins
- Grand Tours Vuelta a España 2 individual stages (2018) One-day races and classics National Road Race Championships (2010)

Benjamin T. King (born March 22, 1989) is an American former professional road racing cyclist, who competed as a professional from 2008 to 2022.

== Personal ==
Born in Richmond, Virginia, King spent his adolescence in North Garden, Virginia, United States. He now resides in North Garden and Lucca, Tuscany, Italy. King graduated from Monticello High School, in Charlottesville, Virginia, in 2007. He attended Virginia Tech between 2008 and 2009.

== Career ==
King rode for UCI Continental teams Kelly Benefit Strategies–Medifast (2008), and Trek–Livestrong (2009 and 2010), winning the United States National Road Race Championships in September 2010.

King signed with Team RadioShack, a UCI ProTeam, for the 2011 season, remaining with them as they renamed to RadioShack–Nissan for the 2012 season, then continuing with RadioShack–Leopard the following year.

King signed with Garmin–Sharp, a UCI ProTeam, for the 2014 and 2015 seasons. In March 2015, King won Stage 1 of the Critérium International. He was named in the start list for the 2015 Vuelta a España.

After a 2016 season in which he took a stage win at the Tour of California, in September of that year Team Dimension Data confirmed that King would join them for 2017 with a role as a leader and mentor for the team's younger climbers. The move will reunite King with former Garmin team-mates Tyler Farrar, Nathan Haas and Lachlan Morton.

In May 2018, he was named in the startlist for the 2018 Giro d'Italia and finished 44th in the General Classification out of 149 finishing cyclists.

In August 2018, he won the first Grand Tour stage of his career at the Vuelta a España on stage 4 and backed this up with another victory on stage 9. He would finish the race in 24th overall.

== Major results ==
2007
National Junior Road Championships

1st Road race
1st Time trial

5th Overall Tour de l'Abitibi
2009
3rd Road race, National Under-23 Road Championships
8th Overall Univest Grand Prix
2010
1st Road race, National Road Championships
1st Road race, National Under-23 Road Championships
3rd Overall Coupe des nations Ville Saguenay
6th Paris–Roubaix Espoirs
7th Overall Nature Valley Grand Prix

1st Young rider classification

Pan American Road Championships

9th Time trial
10th Road race

9th Overall Cascade Cycling Classic

1st Young rider classification

2011
1st Young rider classification, Tour of Beijing
5th Road race, National Road Championships
2013
1st Shenandoah 100
Most Aggressive, USA Pro Cycling Challenge
2014
8th GP Miguel Induráin
2015
1st Stage 1 Critérium International
2nd Time trial, National Road Championships
2016
1st Stage 2 Tour of California
2018
Vuelta a España

1st Stages 4 & 9

1st Mountains classification, Volta ao Algarve
5th Road race, National Road Championships
2020
8th Ardèche Classic
2021
1st Stage 6 Volta a Portugal
8th Vuelta a Castilla y León
2022
1st Mountains classification, Volta a la Comunitat Valenciana
4th Road race, National Road Championships

=== Grand Tour general classification results timeline ===
Grand Tour	2014	2015	2016	2017	2018	2019
Giro d'Italia	—	—	—	—	44	—
Tour de France	53	—	—	—	—	62
Vuelta a España	—	75	46	DNF	24	38

Legend
—	Did not compete
DNF	Did not finish

Sporting positions
Preceded by George Hincapie	United States National Road Race Championships; Winner; 2010	Succeeded by Matthew Busche
