= Sertolovo =

Town in Leningrad Oblast, Russia

Sertolovo Сертолово
- Town
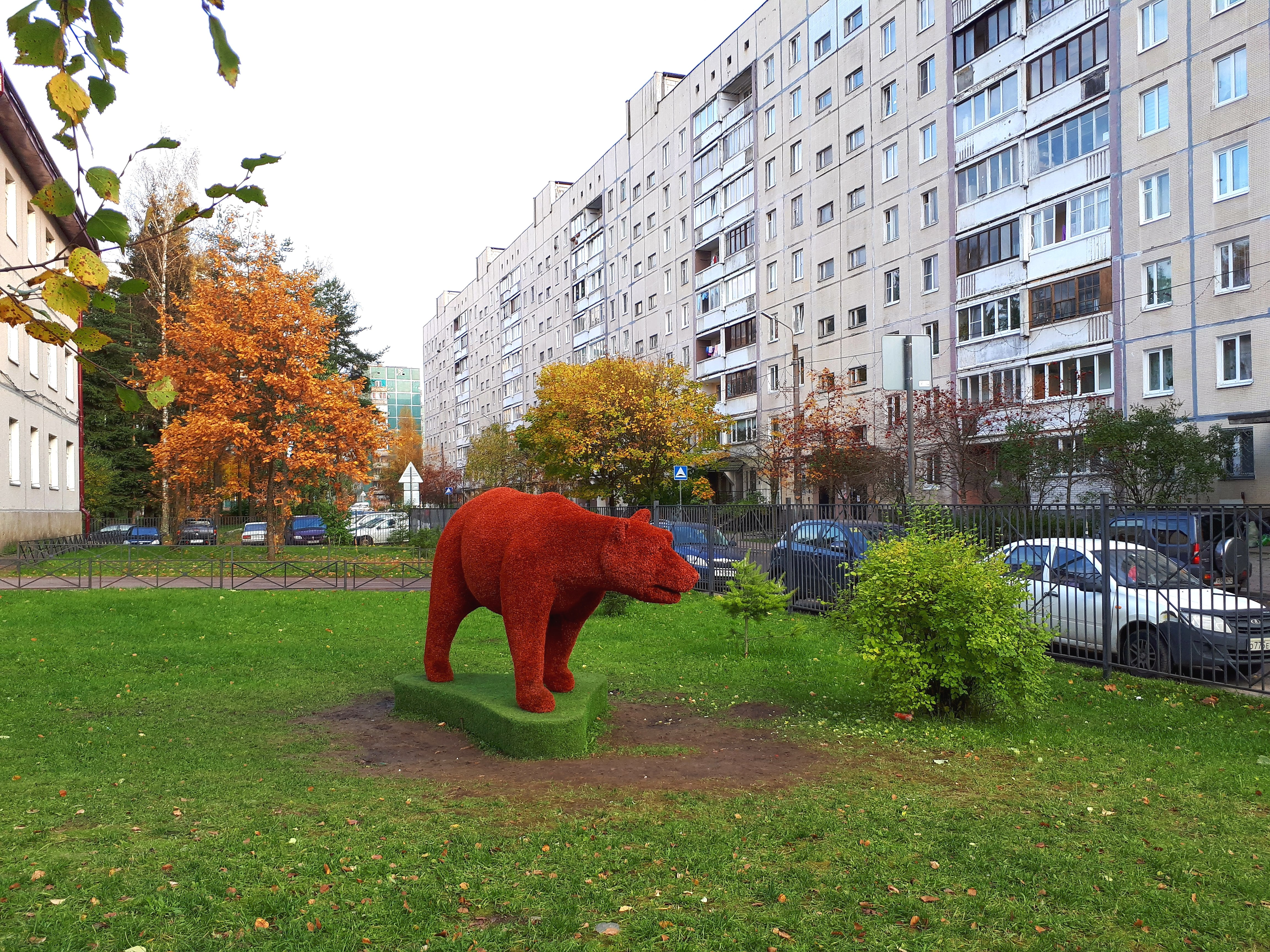

- Flag Coat of arms
- Interactive map of Sertolovo
- Location of Sertolovo Sertolovo (Leningrad Oblast)
- Coordinates: 60°09′N 30°13′E
- Country: Russia
- Federal subject: Leningrad Oblast
- Administrative district: Vsevolozhsky District
- Settlement municipal formationSelsoviet: Sertolovskoye Settlement Municipal Formation
- Founded: 1936
- Town status since: 1998
- Elevation: 50 m (160 ft)

Population (2010 Census)
  - Total: 47,457
  - Estimate (2024): 71,614 (+50.9%)

Administrative status
  - Capital of: Sertolovskoye Settlement Municipal Formation

Municipal status
  - Municipal district: Vsevolozhsky Municipal District
  - Urban settlement: Sertolovskoye Urban Settlement
  - Capital of: Sertolovskoye Urban Settlement
- Time zone: UTC+3 (MSK)
- Postal codes: 188650, 188651, 188655
- OKTMO ID: 41612102001
- Website: www.mosertolovo.ru

Sertolovo (Russian: Се́ртолово; Finnish: Sierattala) is a town in Vsevolozhsky District of Leningrad Oblast, Russia, located north of St. Petersburg. Population: 68,241 (2021 census); 47,457 (2010 census); 38,444 (2002 census); 17,705 (1989 Soviet census).

== History ==
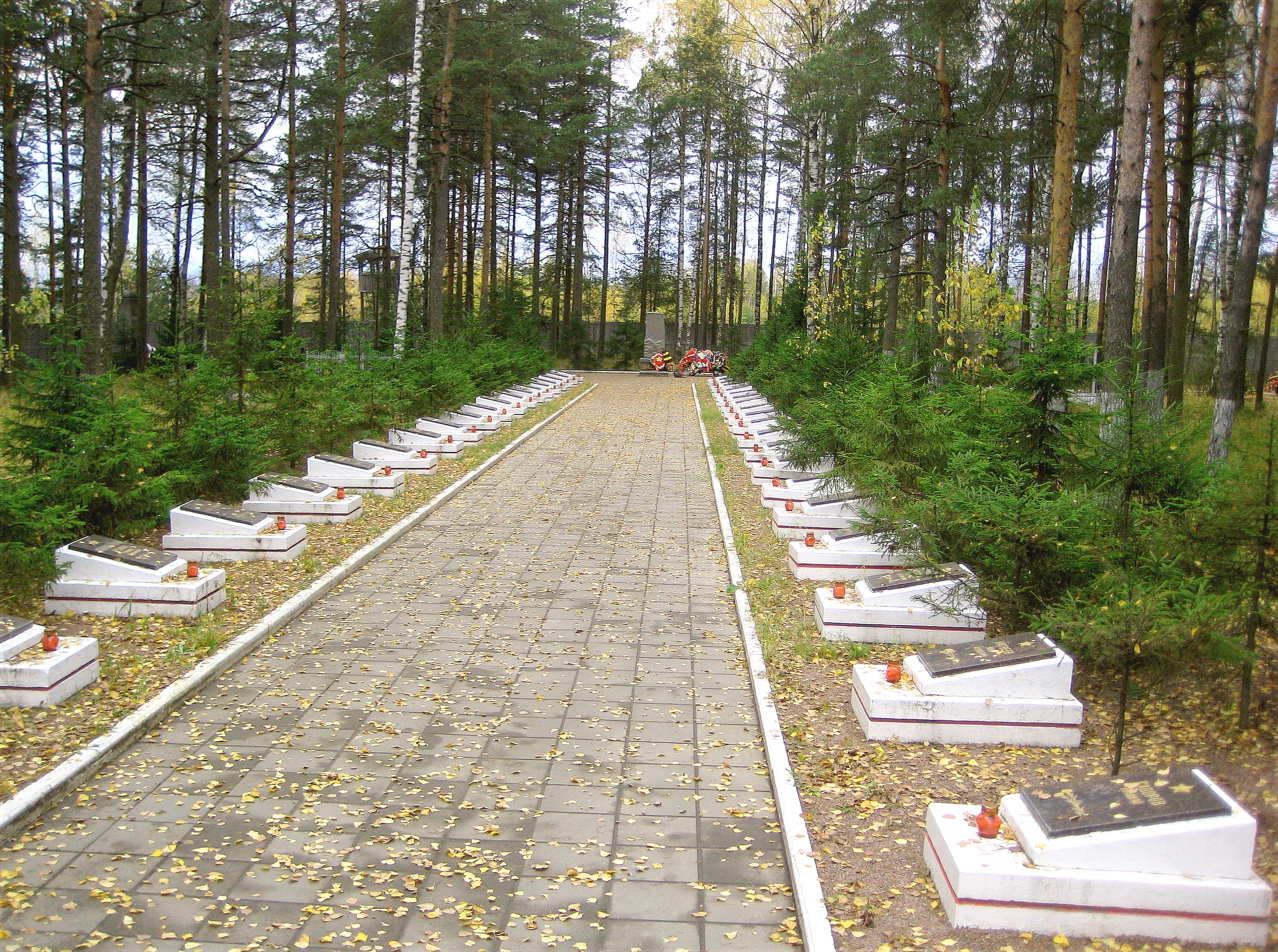
War cemetery in Sertolovo

It was founded in 1936 on the place of a former settlement of Ingrian Finns, whose inhabitants were deported. The settlement was mentioned in earlier sources as Sirotala. In 1936, military personnel moved in and in 1939–1940, Sertolovo was used as a base from where troops were sent to the Winter War. From the beginning, Sertolovo was a part of Vsevolozhsky District of Leningrad Oblast. During World War II, it was not occupied and was together with the city of Leningrad surrounded by German and Finnish troops. After the war, there was almost no civil population in Sertolovo, until massive housing construction started in the 1950s. In 1977, Sertolovo was granted urban-type settlement status, and in 1998, town status. It was the town of oblast significance until 2010, when the administrative structure of Leningrad Oblast was harmonized with its municipal structure. At that time, Sertolovo became a town of district significance.

== Administrative and municipal status ==
Within the framework of administrative divisions, it is, together with the settlement of Zapadnaya Litsa, incorporated within Vsevolozhsky District as Sertolovskoye Settlement Municipal Formation. As a municipal division, Sertolovskoye Settlement Municipal Formation is incorporated within Vsevolozhsky Municipal District as Sertolovskoye Urban Settlement.

== Economy ==
The economy of Sertolovo is based on military installations. About 70% of the population as of 2009 were the military personnel and their families.

=== Industry ===
Industrial enterprises in Sertolovo produce concrete constructions and plastic containers.

=== Transportation ===
Sertolovo is essentially a suburb of St. Petersburg and is included into the suburban road network. In particular, it is located on the highway heading in the direction of Vyborg.

The town is several kilometers northeast of the Pesochnaya railway platform located on the railroad which connects St. Petersburg and Vyborg.

== Notable people ==
- Aleksandr Belousov (born 1952), Russian general
- Maksim Molokoyedov (born 1987), Russian footballer
- Sergey Chernetskiy (born 1990), Russian cyclist
