= Colin Joyce =

American bicycle racer

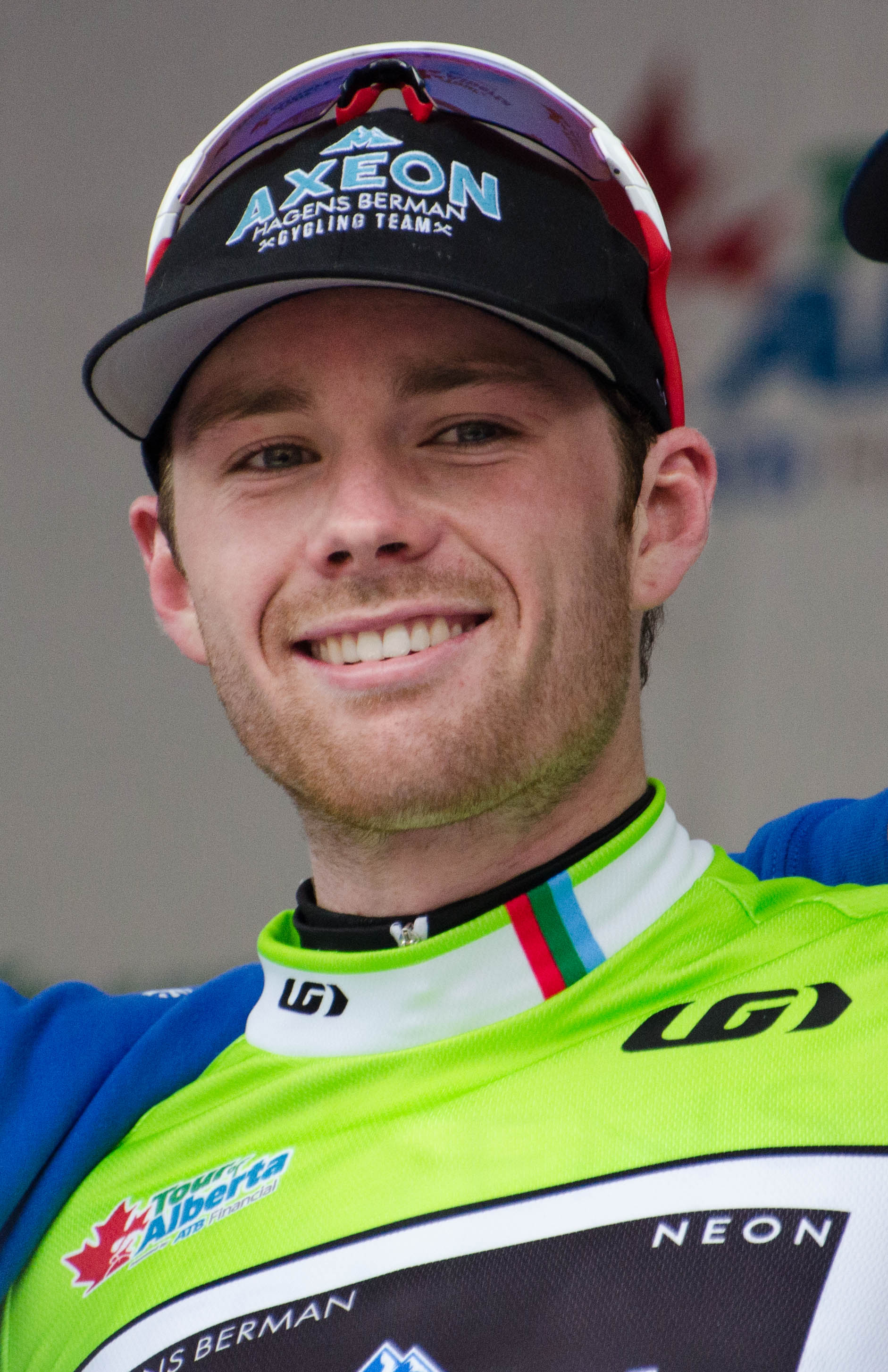
- Joyce at the 2016 Tour of Alberta

Personal information
- Full name: Colin Joyce
- Born: August 6, 1994 (age 32) Pocatello, Idaho, U.S.
- Height: 1.78 m (5 ft 10 in)

Cycling career
- Sport: Cycling
- Current team: Miami Nights
- Discipline: Road
- Role: Rider

Amateur team
- 2013–2015: California Giant–Specialized

Professional teams
- 2016: Axeon–Hagens Berman
- 2017–2023: Rally Cycling
- 2024–: Miami Nights

Colin Joyce (born August 6, 1994) is an American cyclist, who currently rides for the Miami Nights of the National Cycling League.

== Major results ==
2011
2nd Road race, National Junior Road Championships
2012
5th Overall Le Trophée Centre Morbihan
8th Overall Trofeo Karlsberg
2015
3rd Road race, National Under-23 Road Championships
3rd Overall GP Liberty Seguros
5th The Reading 120
7th La Côte Picarde
2016
1st Stage 1 (TTT) Olympia's Tour
4th Overall Tour of Alberta

1st Young rider classification
1st Points classification
1st Stage 1

2017
5th Road race, National Road Championships
7th Overall Tour of Alberta
2018
2nd Winston-Salem Cycling Classic
3rd Overall Arctic Race of Norway

1st Stage 2

4th Overall Vuelta a Castilla y León
2019
1st Rutland–Melton CiCLE Classic
2021
1st Stage 4 Danmark Rundt
2022
5th Grand Prix Criquielion
2023
5th Classic Loire Atlantique
