= Kevin Seeldraeyers =

Belgian cyclist

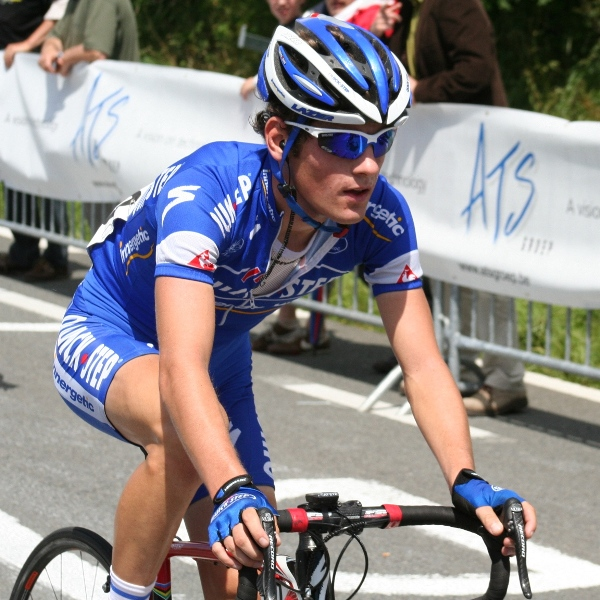

Personal information
- Full name: Kevin Seeldraeyers
- Born: 12 September 1986 (age 40) Boom, Antwerp, Belgium
- Height: 174 cm (5 ft 9 in)
- Weight: 60 kg (132 lb; 9 st 6 lb)

Cycling career
- Sport: Cycling
- Current team: Retired
- Discipline: Road
- Role: Rider

Amateur team
- 2006: Beveren 2000

Professional teams
- 2007–2011: Quick-Step–Innergetic
- 2012–2013: Astana
- 2014: Wanty–Groupe Gobert
- 2015: Torku Şekerspor

Major wins
- Grand Tours Giro d'Italia Young rider classification (2009)

Kevin Seeldraeyers (born 12 September 1986 in Boom Antwerp) is a Belgian retired professional road bicycle racer.

== Career ==
In 2009, he won the young riders jersey in the Giro d'Italia with a 14th-place finish.

For the 2014 season, Seeldraeyers moved to the Wanty–Groupe Gobert team.

Seeldrayers ended his career at the end of 2015 after failing to find a new team.

== Major results ==
2005
2nd Overall Ronde de l'Isard

1st Young rider classification
1st Stage 2

2006
1st Overall Tour de la Province de Liège
2nd Overall Tour des Pyrénées
8th Overall Giro della Valle d'Aosta

1st Stage 2

2007
5th Overall Tour de Georgia
2009
4th Overall Tour of Austria
7th Overall Paris–Nice

1st Young rider classification

10th Overall Giro d'Italia

1st Young rider classification

2011
9th Overall Volta a Catalunya
2013
3rd Overall Tour of Austria

1st Points classification
1st Mountains classification
1st Stages 1 & 2

2014
10th Overall Boucles de la Mayenne
2015
10th Overall Tour du Maroc

=== Grand Tour general classification results timeline ===
| Grand Tour | 2008 | 2009 | 2010 | 2011 | 2012 |
|---|---|---|---|---|---|
| Giro d'Italia | 73 | 10 | — | 50 | 33 |
| Tour de France | — | — | 134 | — | — |
| Vuelta a España | — | — | — | 23 | 39 |

Legend
| — | Did not compete |
| DNF | Did not finish |
