= 2013 Roma Maxima =

2013 UCI Europe Tour

Race details
- Dates: March 3
- Stages: 1
- Distance: 180 km (111.8 mi)
- Winning time: 4h 26' 17"

Results
	Winner	Blel Kadri (FRA)	(Ag2r–La Mondiale)
	Second	Filippo Pozzato (ITA)	(Lampre–Merida)
	Third	Grega Bole (SLO)	(Vacansoleil–DCM)

The 2013 Roma Maxima was the 75th edition of the Italian semi-classic cycle race previously known as Giro del Lazio. The Giro del Lazio had not been held since 2008, and the 2013 edition was the first one with the new name.

The race was scheduled on 3 March 2013; it started on Via Appia Antica in Rome, passed through the cobblestone section of the ancient Appian Way and the steep climbs of the Roman hills, and ended again in Rome in Via dei Fori Imperiali, near the Coliseum, after 180 kilometres (110 mi).

The French Blel Kadri won the race after a 127 km (78.9 mi) breakaway. Kadri, together with André Cardoso, Christophe Prémont, Pim Ligthart and Albert Timmer, got away after 53 km (32.9 mi); on the climb to Campi di Annibale he dropped the other riders and powered on alone with 40 km (24.9 mi) to go. A five-rider group, among whom there was also Vincenzo Nibali, tried to chase Kadri down, but Kadri managed to hold the gap all the way to Rome. Lampre–Merida's Filippo Pozzato won the sprint for the second place, and Grega Bole (Vacansoleil–DCM) was third. Since Roma Maxima is not a World Tour event, riders were not allowed to use the radio during the race; so both Pozzato and Bole did not know that Kadri was still away, and Pozzato celebrated on the finish line thinking he had won the race.

== Teams ==
The start list included 16 teams – 9 ProTeams and 7 Professional Continental Teams – and a total of 128 riders. Among them, the pre-race favourites were Movistar Team pairing Alejandro Valverde and Giovanni Visconti, Lampre–Merida's Damiano Cunego and Filippo Pozzato, Ag2r–La Mondiale rider Carlos Betancur and Oscar Gatto of Vini Fantini–Selle Italia.

- Ag2r–La Mondiale
- Androni Giocattoli–Venezuela
- Astana
- Bardiani Valvole–CSF Inox
- BMC Racing Team
- Caja Rural–Seguros RGA
- Cannondale
- Colombia
- Crelan–Euphony
- IAM Cycling
- Team Katusha
- Lampre–Merida
- Movistar Team
- Argos–Shimano
- Vacansoleil–DCM
- Vini Fantini–Selle Italia

== Results ==
	Cyclist	Team	Time
1	Blel Kadri (FRA)	Ag2r–La Mondiale	4h 26' 17"
2	Filippo Pozzato (ITA)	Lampre–Merida	+ 37"
3	Grega Bole (SLO)	Vacansoleil–DCM	+ 37"
4	Enrico Barbin (ITA)	Bardiani Valvole–CSF Inox	+ 37"
5	Simone Ponzi (ITA)	Astana	+ 37"
6	Leonardo Duque (COL)	Colombia	+ 37"
7	Giovanni Visconti (ITA)	Movistar Team	+ 37"
8	Simon Geschke (GER)	Argos–Shimano	+ 37"
9	Sergey Lagutin (UZB)	Vacansoleil–DCM	+ 37"
10	Sergey Chernetskiy (RUS)	Team Katusha	+ 37"
