= Sergey Chernetskiy =

Russian cyclist (born 1990)

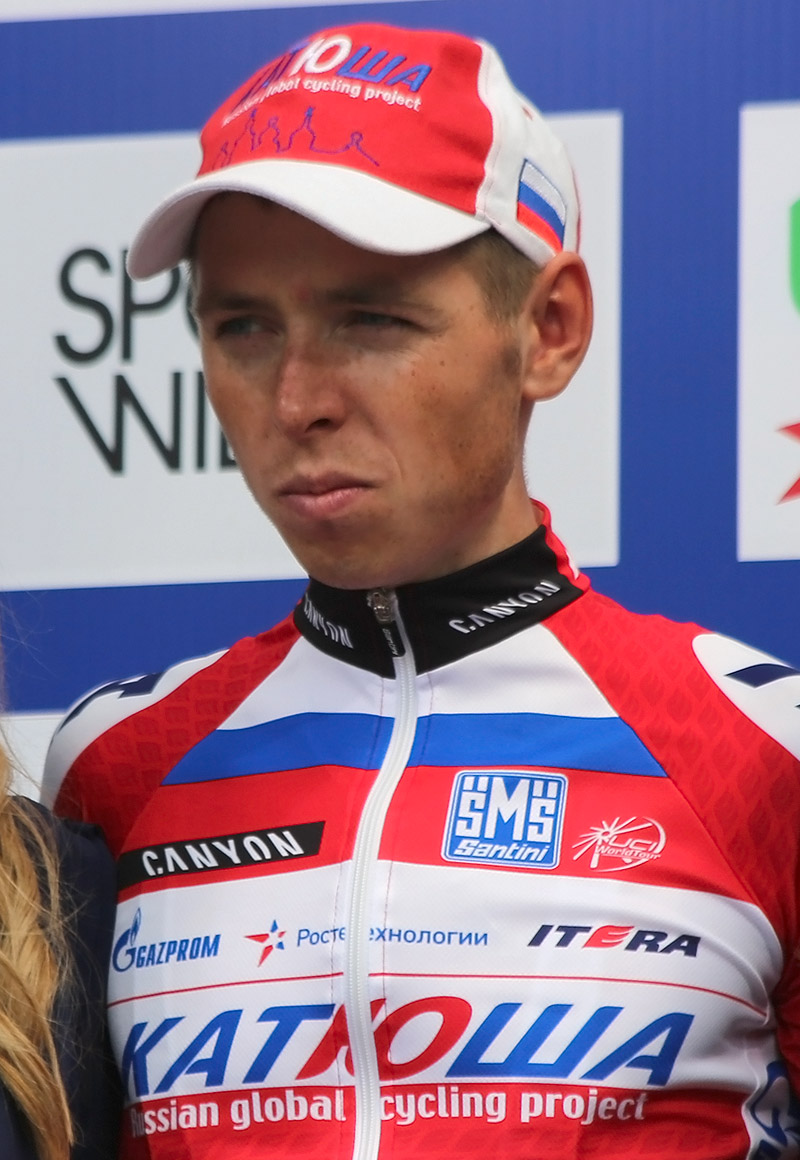
- Chernetskiy at the 2013 Tour of Austria

Personal information
- Full name: Sergey Vitaliyevich Chernetskiy
- Born: 9 April 1990 (age 36) Sertolovo, Russian SFSR, Soviet Union
- Height: 1.76 m (5 ft 9 in)
- Weight: 63 kg (139 lb)

Cycling career
- Sport: Cycling
- Disciplines: Road; Track
- Role: Rider
- Rider type: All-rounder

Amateur team
- 2010–2011: Lokomotiv

Professional teams
- 2012: Itera–Katusha
- 2013–2016: Team Katusha
- 2017–2018: Astana
- 2019: Caja Rural–Seguros RGA
- 2020–2022: Gazprom–RusVelo

Major wins
- Stage races Arctic Race of Norway (2018) One-day races and Classics National Time Trial Championships (2016)

Sergey Vitaliyevich Chernetskiy (Russian: Сергей Витальевич Чернецкий; born 9 April 1990 in Sertolovo) is a Russian cyclist, who last rode for UCI ProTeam Gazprom–RusVelo. In August 2019, he was named in the startlist for the 2019 Vuelta a España.

== Major results ==
2010
1st Team pursuit, UEC European Under-23 Road Championships
8th Overall Troféu Joaquim Agostinho
8th Klasika Primavera
2011
UEC European Under-23 Road Championships

1st Team pursuit
2nd Individual pursuit

4th Klasika Primavera
5th Overall Troféu Joaquim Agostinho
10th Piccolo Giro di Lombardia
2012
2nd Time trial, National Under-23 Road Championships
2nd Overall Ronde de l'Isard

1st Stage 2

2nd Overall Giro della Valle d'Aosta

1st Stage 6 (ITT)

2nd Gran Premio Città di Camaiore
2nd Chrono Champenois
4th Overall Rhône-Alpes Isère Tour

1st Young rider classification

4th Overall Tour de l'Avenir
4th Duo Normand (with Anton Vorobyev)
9th Time trial, UCI Under-23 Road World Championships
2013
1st Overall Tour des Fjords

1st Points classification
1st Young rider classification
1st Stages 1 & 3 (TTT)

1st Stage 1b (TTT) Settimana Internazionale di Coppi e Bartali
4th Overall Tour of Austria
7th Overall Vuelta a Burgos
10th Roma Maxima
2014
National Road Championships

2nd Time trial
4th Road race

2nd Tour of Almaty
3rd GP Miguel Induráin
5th Overall Tour of Beijing
7th Milano–Torino
8th Trofeo Platja de Muro
9th Grand Prix of Aargau Canton
2015
1st Stage 6 Volta a Catalunya
7th Overall Volta ao Algarve
2016
National Road Championships

1st Time trial
4th Road race

4th Overall Tour of Belgium
5th GP Miguel Induráin
7th Overall Tour La Provence
10th Overall Tour de Suisse
10th Grand Prix of Aargau Canton
2017
8th Overall Vuelta a Burgos
10th Giro di Lombardia
2018
1st Overall Arctic Race of Norway
3rd Overall Tour of Guangxi
8th Overall Tour Poitou-Charentes en Nouvelle-Aquitaine
2019
5th Prueba Villafranca de Ordizia
10th Overall Vuelta a Murcia
2020
7th Overall Tour of Saudi Arabia
8th Overall Tour du Limousin
2021
4th Overall Sibiu Cycling Tour
7th Giro della Toscana

=== Grand Tour general classification results timeline ===
Grand Tour	2014	2015	2016	2017	2018	2019
Giro d'Italia	—	114	—	—	—	—
Tour de France	Has not contested during his career					
Vuelta a España	113	—	—	94	—	111

Legend
—	Did not compete
DNF	Did not finish
