= 2013 Tour of Austria =

2013 UCI Europe Tour

Race details
- Dates: 30 June–7 July
- Stages: 8
- Distance: 1,115.2 km (693.0 mi)

Results
Jersey awarded to the overall winner	Winner	Riccardo Zoidl (Austria)	(Gourmetfein–Simplon)
	Second	Alexandr Dyachenko (Kazakhstan)	(Astana)
	Third	Kevin Seeldraeyers (Belgium)	(Astana)
Jersey awarded to the points classification winner	Points	Kevin Seeldraeyers (Belgium)	(Astana)
Jersey awarded to the mountains classification winner	Mountains	Kevin Seeldraeyers (Belgium)	(Astana)
Jersey awarded to the youth classification winner	Youth	Sergey Chernetskiy (Russia)	(Team Katusha)
	Team	(Kazakhstan) Astana	

The 2013 Tour of Austria (German: 2013 Internationale Österreich Rundfahrt) was the 65th edition of the Tour of Austria, an annual bicycle race. Departing from Innsbruck on June 30, concluded in Vienna on July 7. The 1115.2 km long stage race is part of the 2013 UCI Europe Tour, and is rated as a 2.HC event.

== Teams ==
18 teams were invited to participate in the tour: 9 UCI ProTeams, 4 UCI Professional Continental Teams and 5 UCI Continental Teams.

UCI ProTeams
- Astana
- Cannondale
- BMC Racing Team
- Lotto–Belisol
- Omega Pharma–Quick-Step
- RadioShack–Leopard
- Team Katusha
- Saxo–Tinkoff
- Team Sky
UCI Professional Continental Teams
- Androni Giocattoli–Venezuela
- Cofidis
- IAM Cycling
- MTN–Qhubeka
UCI Continental Teams
- Arbö–Gebrüder Weiss–Oberndorfer
- Gourmetfein–Simplon
- Team Vorarlberg
- Tirol Cycling Team
- WSA

== Stages ==
=== Stage 1 ===
30 June 2013 – Innsbruck to Kühtai, 134.9 km (83.8 mi)

Stage 1 Result

	Rider	Team	Time
1	Kevin Seeldraeyers (BEL)	Astana	4h 06' 02"
2	Riccardo Zoidl (AUT)	Gourmetfein–Simplon	+ 8"
3	Joe Dombrowski (USA)	Team Sky	+ 13"
4	Dries Devenyns (BEL)	Omega Pharma–Quick-Step	+ 24"
5	Matthew Busche (USA)	RadioShack–Leopard	+ 24"
6	Alexsandr Dyachenko (KAZ)	Astana	+ 24"
7	Sergey Chernetskiy (RUS)	Team Katusha	+ 59"
8	Nicolas Edet (FRA)	Cofidis	+ 59"
9	Fabio Aru (ITA)	Astana	+ 59"
10	Petr Ignatenko (RUS)	Team Katusha	+ 59"

General Classification after Stage 1

	Rider	Team	Time
1	Kevin Seeldraeyers (BEL)	Astana	4h 06' 02"
2	Riccardo Zoidl (AUT)	Gourmetfein–Simplon	+ 12"
3	Joe Dombrowski (USA)	Team Sky	+ 19"
4	Dries Devenyns (BEL)	Omega Pharma–Quick-Step	+ 34"
5	Matthew Busche (USA)	RadioShack–Leopard	+ 34"
6	Alexsandr Dyachenko (KAZ)	Astana	+ 34"
7	Sergey Chernetskiy (RUS)	Team Katusha	+ 1' 09"
8	Nicolas Edet (FRA)	Cofidis	+ 1' 09"
9	Fabio Aru (ITA)	Astana	+ 1' 09"
10	Petr Ignatenko (RUS)	Team Katusha	+ 1' 09"

=== Stage 2 ===
1 July 2013 – Innsbruck to Kitzbüheler Horn, 157.4 km (97.8 mi)

Stage 2 Result

	Rider	Team	Time
1	Kevin Seeldraeyers (BEL)	Astana	4h 17' 15"
2	Alexsandr Dyachenko (KAZ)	Astana	+ 5"
3	Fabio Aru (ITA)	Astana	+ 14"
4	Dries Devenyns (BEL)	Omega Pharma–Quick-Step	+ 26"
5	Riccardo Zoidl (AUT)	Gourmetfein–Simplon	+ 37"
6	Nicolas Edet (FRA)	Cofidis	+ 44"
7	Petr Ignatenko (RUS)	Team Katusha	+ 51"
8	Matija Kvasina (CRO)	Gourmetfein–Simplon	+ 56"
9	Sergey Chernetskiy (RUS)	Team Katusha	+ 1' 05"
10	Jure Golčer (SLO)	Tirol Cycling Team	+ 1' 13"

General Classification after Stage 2

	Rider	Team	Time
1	Kevin Seeldraeyers (BEL)	Astana	8h 22' 57"
2	Alexsandr Dyachenko (KAZ)	Astana	+ 43"
3	Riccardo Zoidl (AUT)	Gourmetfein–Simplon	+ 59"
4	Dries Devenyns (BEL)	Omega Pharma–Quick-Step	+ 1' 10"
5	Fabio Aru (ITA)	Astana	+ 1' 29"
6	Nicolas Edet (FRA)	Cofidis	+ 2' 03"
7	Petr Ignatenko (RUS)	Team Katusha	+ 2' 10"
8	Matthew Busche (USA)	RadioShack–Leopard	+ 2' 15"
9	Sergey Chernetskiy (RUS)	Team Katusha	+ 2' 24"
10	Stefan Denifl (AUT)	IAM Cycling	+ 3' 05"

=== Stage 3 ===
2 July 2013 – Heiligenblut to Matrei, 119.7 km (74.4 mi)

Stage 3 Result

	Rider	Team	Time
1	Thor Hushovd (NOR)	BMC Racing Team	2h 53' 31"
2	Daniel Oss (ITA)	BMC Racing Team	s.t.
3	Gianni Meersman (BEL)	Omega Pharma–Quick-Step	s.t.
4	Simone Ponzi (ITA)	Astana	s.t.
5	Fabio Felline (ITA)	Androni Giocattoli–Venezuela	s.t.
6	Tosh Van der Sande (BEL)	Lotto–Belisol	s.t.
7	Greg Van Avermaet (BEL)	BMC Racing Team	s.t.
8	Daniele Ratto (ITA)	Cannondale	s.t.
9	Jan Ghyselinck (BEL)	Cofidis	s.t.
10	Jonathan Cantwell (AUS)	Saxo–Tinkoff	s.t.

General Classification after Stage 3

	Rider	Team	Time
1	Kevin Seeldraeyers (BEL)	Astana	11h 16' 28"
2	Alexsandr Dyachenko (KAZ)	Astana	+ 43"
3	Riccardo Zoidl (AUT)	Gourmetfein–Simplon	+ 59"
4	Dries Devenyns (BEL)	Omega Pharma–Quick-Step	+ 1' 10"
5	Fabio Aru (ITA)	Astana	+ 1' 29"
6	Nicolas Edet (FRA)	Cofidis	+ 2' 03"
7	Petr Ignatenko (RUS)	Team Katusha	+ 2' 10"
8	Matthew Busche (USA)	RadioShack–Leopard	+ 2' 15"
9	Sergey Chernetskiy (RUS)	Team Katusha	+ 2' 24"
10	Stefan Denifl (AUT)	IAM Cycling	+ 3' 05"

=== Stage 4 ===
3 July 2013 – Matrei to Sankt Johann, 146.0 km (90.7 mi)

Stage 4 Result

	Rider	Team	Time
1	Mathias Frank (SUI)	BMC Racing Team	3h 42' 39"
2	Chris Anker Sørensen (DEN)	Saxo–Tinkoff	+ 8"
3	Matija Kvasina (CRO)	Gourmetfein–Simplon	+ 8"
4	Matthew Busche (USA)	RadioShack–Leopard	+ 10"
5	Rafał Majka (POL)	Saxo–Tinkoff	+ 12"
6	Stefano Agostini (ITA)	Cannondale	+ 16"
7	Robert Kišerlovski (CRO)	RadioShack–Leopard	+ 16"
8	Ian Boswell (USA)	Team Sky	+ 19"
9	Patrick Facchini (ITA)	Androni Giocattoli–Venezuela	+ 20"
10	Gianluca Brambilla (ITA)	Omega Pharma–Quick-Step	+ 26"

General Classification after Stage 4

	Rider	Team	Time
1	Kevin Seeldraeyers (BEL)	Astana	14h 59' 42"
2	Riccardo Zoidl (AUT)	Gourmetfein–Simplon	+ 59"
3	Alexsandr Dyachenko (KAZ)	Astana	+ 1' 04"
4	Dries Devenyns (BEL)	Omega Pharma–Quick-Step	+ 1' 31"
5	Matthew Busche (USA)	RadioShack–Leopard	+ 1' 50"
6	Nicolas Edet (FRA)	Cofidis	+ 2' 01"
7	Fabio Aru (ITA)	Astana	+ 2' 09"
8	Petr Ignatenko (RUS)	Team Katusha	+ 2' 17"
9	Sergey Chernetskiy (RUS)	Team Katusha	+ 2' 24"
10	Matija Kvasina (CRO)	Gourmetfein–Simplon	+ 2' 49"

=== Stage 5 ===
4 July 2013 – Sankt Johann to Sonntagberg, 228.3 km (141.9 mi)

Stage 5 Result

	Rider	Team	Time
1	Mathias Frank (SUI)	BMC Racing Team	5h 21' 41"
2	Rafał Majka (POL)	Saxo–Tinkoff	+ 5"
3	Nicolas Edet (FRA)	Cofidis	+ 6"
4	Riccardo Zoidl (AUT)	Gourmetfein–Simplon	+ 9"
5	Patrick Facchini (ITA)	Androni Giocattoli–Venezuela	+ 9"
6	Sergey Chernetskiy (RUS)	Team Katusha	+ 12"
7	Petr Ignatenko (RUS)	Team Katusha	+ 12"
8	Alexsandr Dyachenko (KAZ)	Astana	+ 16"
9	Kevin Seeldraeyers (BEL)	Astana	+ 16"
10	Stefano Agostini (ITA)	Cannondale	+ 18"

General Classification after Stage 5

	Rider	Team	Time
1	Kevin Seeldraeyers (BEL)	Astana	20h 21' 39"
2	Riccardo Zoidl (AUT)	Gourmetfein–Simplon	+ 52"
3	Alexsandr Dyachenko (KAZ)	Astana	+ 1' 04"
4	Dries Devenyns (BEL)	Omega Pharma–Quick-Step	+ 1' 45"
5	Nicolas Edet (FRA)	Cofidis	+ 1' 47"
6	Matthew Busche (USA)	RadioShack–Leopard	+ 2' 04"
7	Petr Ignatenko (RUS)	Team Katusha	+ 2' 13"
8	Sergey Chernetskiy (RUS)	Team Katusha	+ 2' 20"
9	Fabio Aru (ITA)	Astana	+ 2' 37"
10	Matija Kvasina (CRO)	Gourmetfein–Simplon	+ 3' 02"

=== Stage 6 ===
5 July 2013 – Maria Taferl to Poysdorf, 182.0 km (113.1 mi)

Stage 6 Result

	Rider	Team	Time
1	Gerald Ciolek (GER)	MTN–Qhubeka	4h 17' 42"
2	Simone Ponzi (ITA)	Astana	s.t.
3	Jonathan Cantwell (AUS)	Saxo–Tinkoff	s.t.
4	Tosh Van der Sande (BEL)	Lotto–Belisol	s.t.
5	Fabio Felline (ITA)	Androni Giocattoli–Venezuela	s.t.
6	Omar Bertazzo (ITA)	Androni Giocattoli–Venezuela	s.t.
7	Thor Hushovd (NOR)	BMC Racing Team	s.t.
8	Alessandro Malaguti (ITA)	Androni Giocattoli–Venezuela	s.t.
9	Daniel Biedermann (AUT)	Team Vorarlberg	s.t.
10	Christopher Sutton (AUS)	Team Sky	s.t.

General Classification after Stage 6

	Rider	Team	Time
1	Kevin Seeldraeyers (BEL)	Astana	24h 39' 21"
2	Riccardo Zoidl (AUT)	Gourmetfein–Simplon	+ 52"
3	Alexsandr Dyachenko (KAZ)	Astana	+ 1' 04"
4	Dries Devenyns (BEL)	Omega Pharma–Quick-Step	+ 1' 45"
5	Nicolas Edet (FRA)	Cofidis	+ 1' 47"
6	Matthew Busche (USA)	RadioShack–Leopard	+ 2' 04
7	Petr Ignatenko (RUS)	Team Katusha	+ 2' 13"
8	Sergey Chernetskiy (RUS)	Team Katusha	+ 2' 20"
9	Fabio Aru (ITA)	Astana	+ 2' 37"
10	Matija Kvasina (CRO)	Gourmetfein–Simplon	+ 3' 02"

=== Stage 7 ===
6 July 2013 – Podersdorf am See to Podersdorf am See, 24.1 km (15.0 mi)

Stage 7 Result

	Rider	Team	Time
1	Fabian Cancellara (SUI)	RadioShack–Leopard	27' 56"
2	Marco Pinotti (ITA)	BMC Racing Team	+ 22"
3	Kristof Vandewalle (BEL)	Omega Pharma–Quick-Step	+ 46"
4	Vladimir Isaichev (RUS)	Team Katusha	+ 48"
5	Jesse Sergent (NZL)	RadioShack–Leopard	+ 49"
6	Sergey Chernetskiy (RUS)	Team Katusha	+ 52"
7	Gianni Meersman (BEL)	Omega Pharma–Quick-Step	+ 1' 06"
8	Gert Jõeäär (EST)	Cofidis	+ 1' 08"
9	Ben King (USA)	RadioShack–Leopard	+ 1' 13"
10	Michel Koch (GER)	Cannondale	+ 1' 15"

General Classification after Stage 7

	Rider	Team	Time
1	Riccardo Zoidl (AUT)	Gourmetfein–Simplon	25h 09' 37"
2	Alexsandr Dyachenko (KAZ)	Astana	+ 33"
3	Kevin Seeldraeyers (BEL)	Astana	+ 50"
4	Sergey Chernetskiy (RUS)	Team Katusha	+ 53"
5	Dries Devenyns (BEL)	Omega Pharma–Quick-Step	+ 1' 20"
6	Petr Ignatenko (RUS)	Team Katusha	+ 1' 24"
7	Matthew Busche (USA)	RadioShack–Leopard	+ 1' 44"
8	Fabio Aru (ITA)	Astana	+ 2' 19"
9	Nicolas Edet (FRA)	Cofidis	+ 2' 32"
10	Matija Kvasina (CRO)	Gourmetfein–Simplon	+ 3' 31"

=== Stage 8 ===
7 July 2013 – Podersdorf am See to Vienna, 122.8 km (76.3 mi)

Stage 8 Result

	Rider	Team	Time
1	Omar Bertazzo (ITA)	Androni Giocattoli–Venezuela	2h 40' 14"
2	Christopher Sutton (AUS)	Team Sky	s.t.
3	Simone Ponzi (ITA)	Astana	s.t.
4	Marco Haller (AUT)	Team Katusha	s.t.
5	Gianni Meersman (BEL)	Omega Pharma–Quick-Step	s.t.
6	Andreas Müller (AUT)	Arbö–Gebrüder Weiss–Oberndorfer	s.t.
7	Mathew Hayman (AUS)	Team Sky	s.t.
8	Daniel Oss (ITA)	BMC Racing Team	s.t.
9	Wolfgang Geisler (AUT)	WSA	s.t.
10	Viacheslav Kuznetsov (RUS)	Team Katusha	s.t.

General Classification after Stage 8

	Rider	Team	Time
1	Riccardo Zoidl (AUT)	Gourmetfein–Simplon	27h 49' 51"
2	Alexsandr Dyachenko (KAZ)	Astana	+ 33"
3	Kevin Seeldraeyers (BEL)	Astana	+ 50"
4	Sergey Chernetskiy (RUS)	Team Katusha	+ 53"
5	Dries Devenyns (BEL)	Omega Pharma–Quick-Step	+ 1' 20"
6	Petr Ignatenko (RUS)	Team Katusha	+ 1' 24"
7	Matthew Busche (USA)	RadioShack–Leopard	+ 1' 45"
8	Fabio Aru (ITA)	Astana	+ 2' 19"
9	Nicolas Edet (FRA)	Cofidis	+ 2' 32"
10	Matija Kvasina (CRO)	Gourmetfein–Simplon	+ 3' 31"

== Classification leadership ==
Stage	Winner	General classification	Points classification	Mountains classification	Young rider classification	Team classification
1	Kevin Seeldraeyers	Kevin Seeldraeyers	Kevin Seeldraeyers	Riccardo Zoidl	Joe Dombrowski	Astana
2	Kevin Seeldraeyers	Kevin Seeldraeyers	Kevin Seeldraeyers	Kevin Seeldraeyers	Fabio Aru	Astana
3	Thor Hushovd	Kevin Seeldraeyers	Kevin Seeldraeyers	Kevin Seeldraeyers	Fabio Aru	Astana
4	Mathias Frank	Kevin Seeldraeyers	Kevin Seeldraeyers	Kevin Seeldraeyers	Fabio Aru	Astana
5	Mathias Frank	Kevin Seeldraeyers	Kevin Seeldraeyers	Kevin Seeldraeyers	Sergey Chernetskiy	Astana
6	Gerald Ciolek	Kevin Seeldraeyers	Kevin Seeldraeyers	Kevin Seeldraeyers	Sergey Chernetskiy	Astana
7	Fabian Cancellara	Riccardo Zoidl	Kevin Seeldraeyers	Kevin Seeldraeyers	Sergey Chernetskiy	Astana
8	Omar Bertazzo	Riccardo Zoidl	Kevin Seeldraeyers	Kevin Seeldraeyers	Sergey Chernetskiy	Astana
Final		Riccardo Zoidl	Kevin Seeldraeyers	Kevin Seeldraeyers	Sergey Chernetskiy	Astana
