= 2014 Tour de France =

2014 UCI World Tour, race 18 of 29
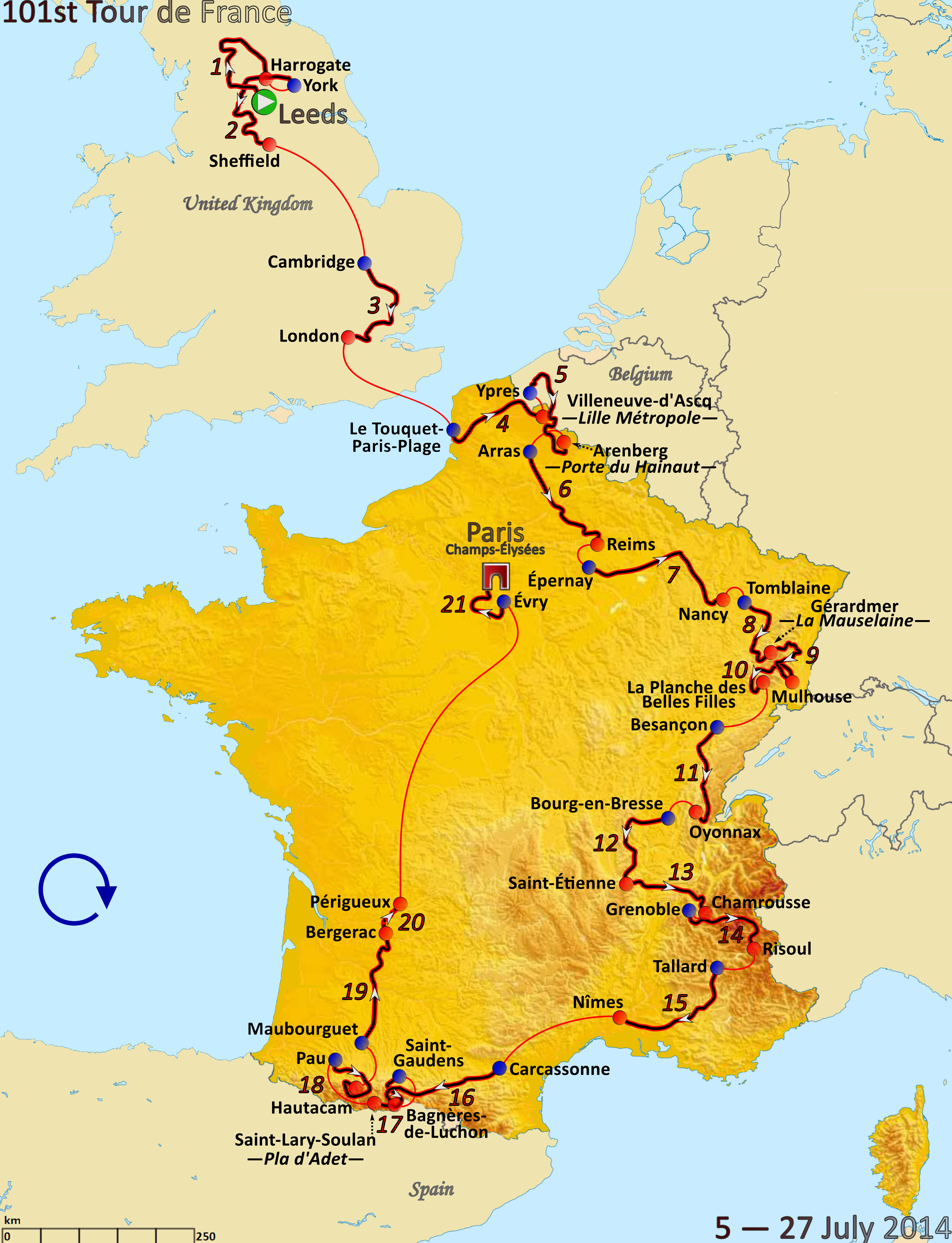
- Route of the 2014 Tour de France

Race details
- Dates: 5–27 July 2014
- Stages: 21
- Distance: 3,660.5 (Note: The race's total distance of 3,660.5 km (2,275 mi) is a calculation of all 21 stages added together (3,663.5 km (2,276 mi)) minus the 3 km (2 mi) removed from stage five.) km (2,275 mi)
- Winning time: 89h 59' 06"

Results
Jersey awarded to the overall winner	Winner	Vincenzo Nibali (ITA)	(Astana)
	Second	Jean-Christophe Péraud (FRA)	(Ag2r–La Mondiale)
	Third	Thibaut Pinot (FRA)	(FDJ.fr)
Jersey awarded to the points classification winner	Points	Peter Sagan (SVK)	(Cannondale)
Jersey awarded to the mountains classification winner	Mountains	Rafał Majka (POL)	(Tinkoff–Saxo)
Jersey awarded to the youth classification winner	Youth	Thibaut Pinot (FRA)	(FDJ.fr)
Jersey awarded to the combativity classification winner	Combativity	Alessandro De Marchi (ITA)	(Cannondale)
Jersey awarded to the team classification winner	Team	(France) Ag2r–La Mondiale	

The 2014 Tour de France was the 101st edition of the race, one of cycling's Grand Tours. The 3,660.5-kilometre (2,274.5 mi) race included 21 stages, starting in Leeds, Yorkshire, United Kingdom, on 5 July and finishing on the Champs-Élysées in Paris on 27 July. The race also visited Belgium for part of a stage. Vincenzo Nibali of the Astana team won the overall general classification by more than seven minutes, the biggest winning margin since 1997. By winning, he had acquired victories in all Grand Tours. Jean-Christophe Péraud (Ag2r–La Mondiale) placed second, with Thibaut Pinot (FDJ.fr) third.

Marcel Kittel of Giant–Shimano was the first rider to wear the general classification leader's yellow jersey after winning stage one. He lost the following day to stage winner Nibali as the race reached the mountains. Nibali held the race lead until the end of the ninth stage, when it was taken by Lotto–Belisol's Tony Gallopin. The yellow jersey returned to Nibali the following stage, and he held it until the conclusion of the race.

The points classification was decided early in the race and was won by Cannondale's Peter Sagan. Rafał Majka of Tinkoff–Saxo, winner of two mountain stages, won the mountains classification. Pinot finished as the best young rider. The team classification was won by Ag2r–La Mondiale and Alessandro De Marchi (Cannondale) was given the award for the most combative rider. Kittel and Nibali won the most stages, with four each.

Following criticism by the professional women's peloton and campaign groups like Le Tour Entier regarding the lack of a women's Tour de France, a one day women's race – La Course by Le Tour de France – was held on the Champs-Élysées, prior to the last stage of the Tour.

== Teams ==
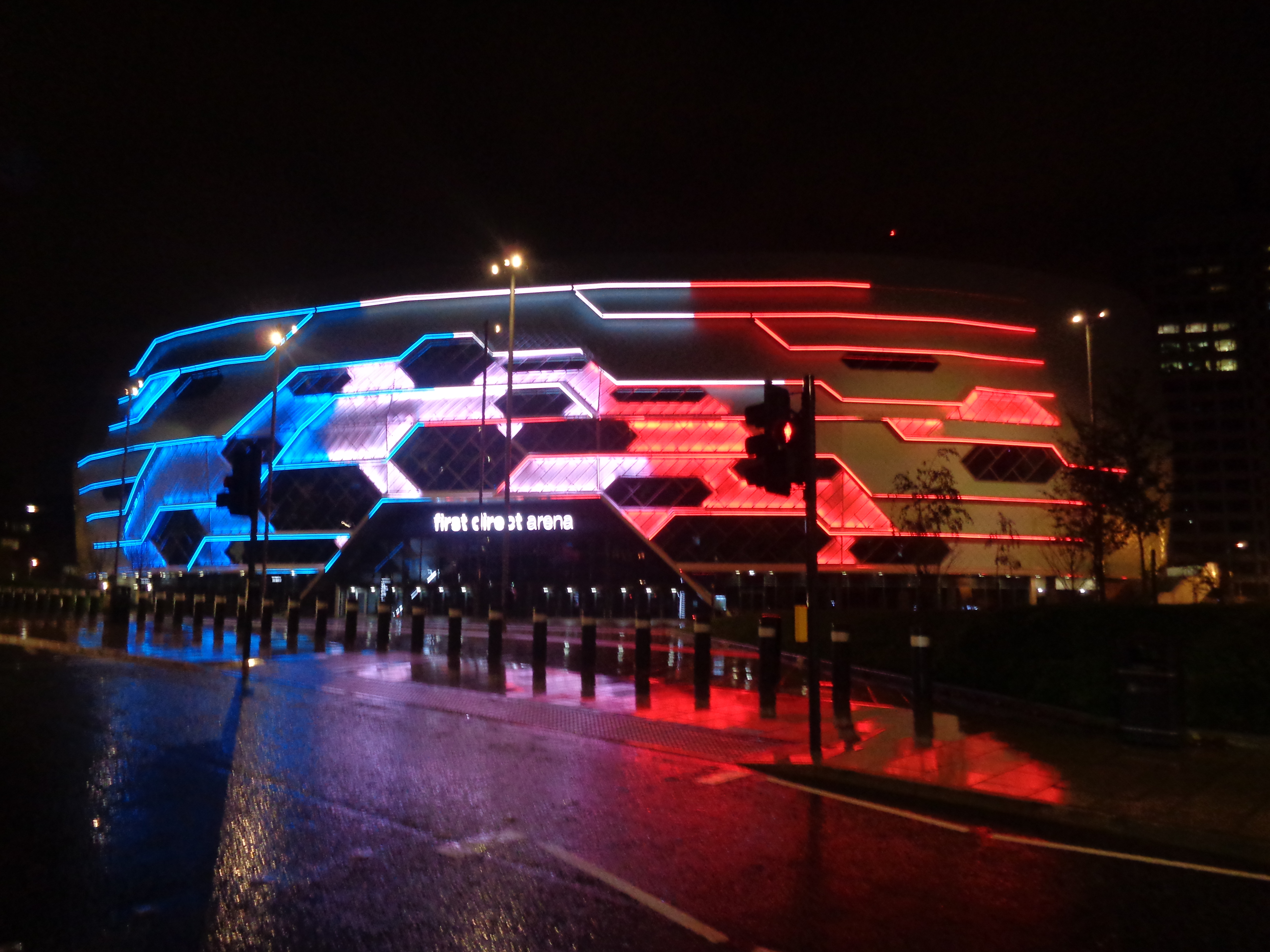
The team presentation ceremony took place inside the First Direct Arena in Leeds, United Kingdom, on 3 July

Twenty-two teams participated in the 2014 edition of the Tour de France. The race was the 18th of the 29 events in the UCI World Tour, and all of its eighteen UCI ProTeams were automatically invited, and obliged, to attend the race. On 28 January 2014, the organiser of the Tour, Amaury Sport Organisation (ASO), announced the four second-tier UCI Professional Continental teams given wildcard invitations: Cofidis, Bretagne–Séché Environnement, IAM Cycling and NetApp–Endura. The team presentation – where the members of each team's roster are introduced in front of the media and local dignitaries – took place at the First Direct Arena in Leeds, United Kingdom, on 3 July, two days before the opening stage held in the city. The riders arrived at the arena by a ceremonial ride from the University of Leeds. The event included performances from Embrace and Opera North, in front of an audience of 10,000.

Each squad was allowed a maximum of nine riders, therefore the start list contained a total of 198 riders. Of these, 47 were riding the Tour de France for the first time. The riders came from 34 countries; France, Spain, Italy, Netherlands, Germany, Australia and Belgium all had 10 or more riders in the race. Giant–Shimano's Ji Cheng was the first Chinese rider to participate in the Tour. Riders from eight countries won stages during the race; German riders won the largest number of stages, with seven. The average age of riders in the race was 29.88 years, ranging from the 20-year-old Danny van Poppel to the 42-year-old Jens Voigt, both Trek Factory Racing riders. Voigt, riding in his final year as a professional, equalled Stuart O'Grady's record for most appearances in the Tour with 17. Garmin–Sharp had the highest average age, while Trek Factory Racing had the lowest.

The teams entering the race were:

UCI ProTeams

- Ag2r–La Mondiale
- Astana
- Belkin Pro Cycling
- BMC Racing Team
- Cannondale
- Team Europcar
- FDJ.fr
- Garmin–Sharp
- Giant–Shimano
- Team Katusha
- Lampre–Merida
- Lotto–Belisol
- Movistar Team
- Omega Pharma–Quick-Step
- Orica–GreenEDGE
- Team Sky
- Tinkoff–Saxo
- Trek Factory Racing

UCI Professional Continental teams

- Bretagne–Séché Environnement
- Cofidis
- IAM Cycling
- NetApp–Endura

== Pre-race favourites ==
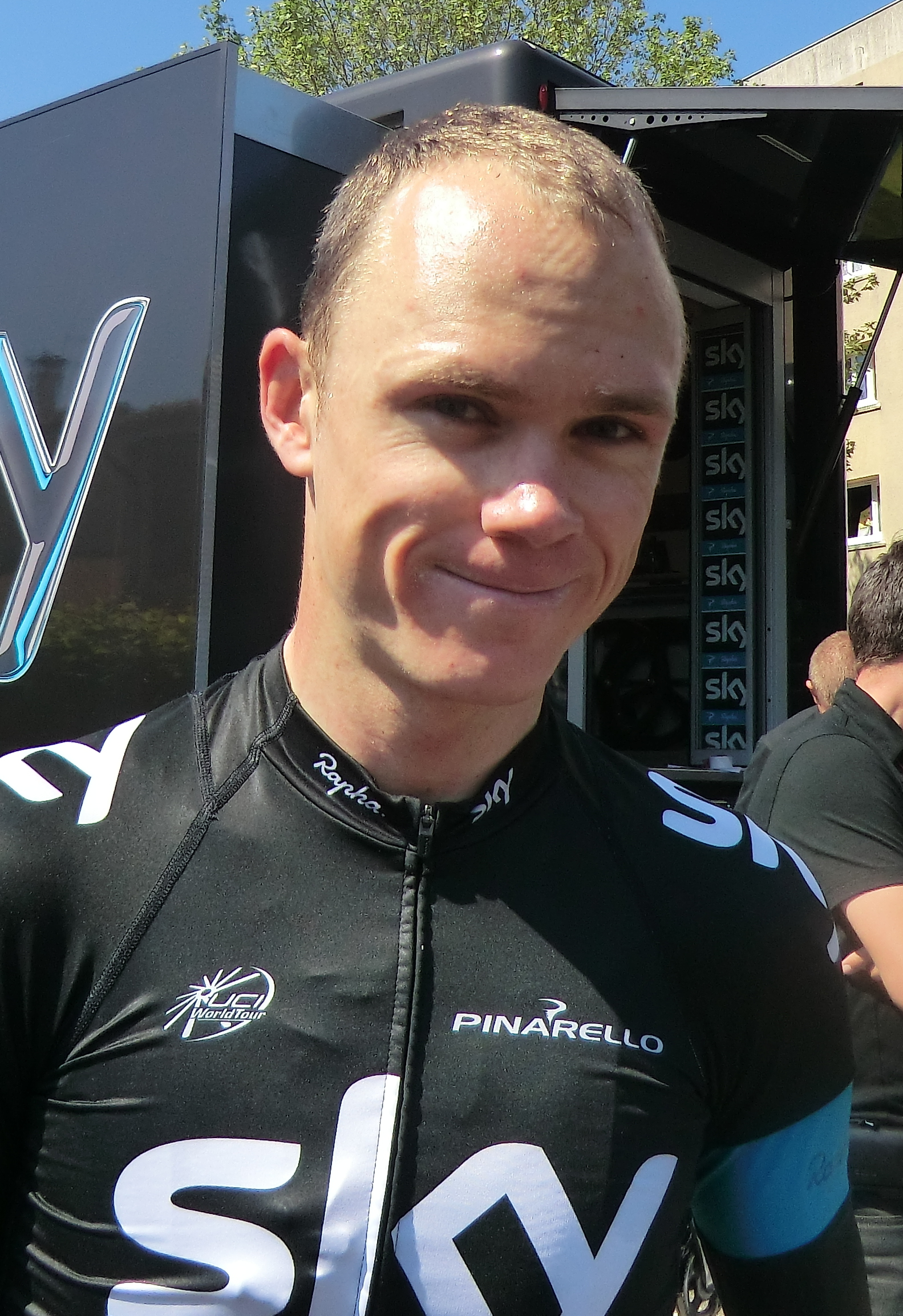
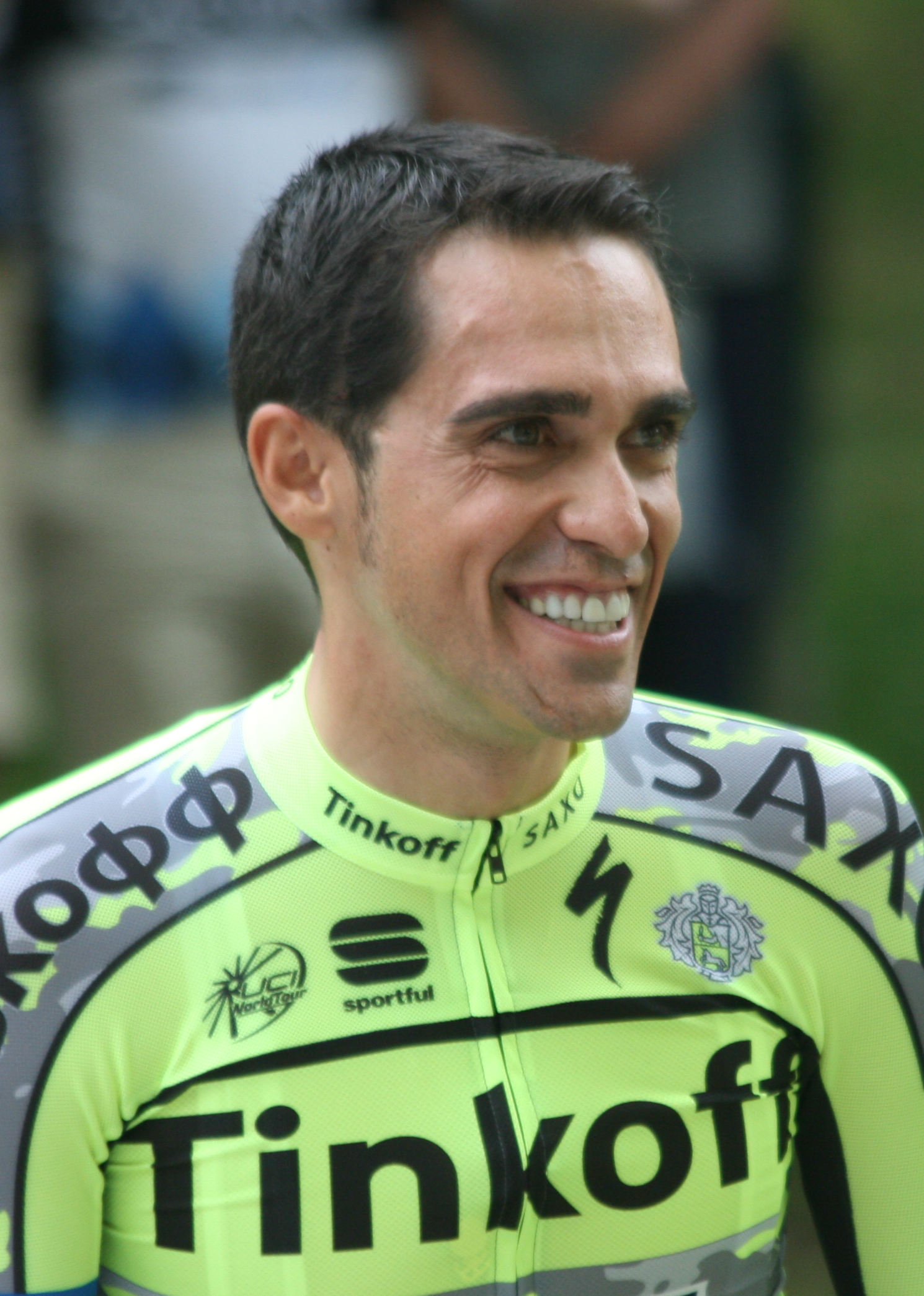
Chris Froome (pictured in 2013) and Alberto Contador (pictured in 2015), were seen by many as the top two general classification pre-race favourites; both were forced to abandon the race due to injuries caused by crashes.

According to many observers before the race the top two favourites for the general classification were Chris Froome (Team Sky) and Alberto Contador (Tinkoff–Saxo). Their closest rivals were thought to have been Vincenzo Nibali (Astana) and Alejandro Valverde (Movistar Team). A possible contender was the 2013 Tour runner-up, Nairo Quintana, who had chosen not to ride the Tour after his 2014 Giro d'Italia win that took place during May. Andy Schleck (Trek Factory Racing), who was retroactively awarded the 2010 Tour title, was selected by his team as a domestique, and was not considered a possible favourite. The other riders considered contenders for the general classification were Andrew Talansky (Garmin–Sharp), Rui Costa (Lampre–Merida), Thibaut Pinot (FDJ.fr), Tejay van Garderen (BMC Racing Team) and Jurgen Van den Broeck (Lotto–Belisol).

Defending champion and runner-up in the 2012 Tour, Froome, had shown his form so far in the 2014 season by winning the general classification of two stage races, the Tour of Oman and the Tour de Romandie. Contador, winner of the 2007 and 2009 Tours, also won two stage races, the Tirreno–Adriatico and the Tour of the Basque Country in the lead-up to the Tour, placing second overall in the Volta ao Algarve, Volta a Catalunya and Critérium du Dauphiné. Nibali had missed the 2013 Tour as he had focused on the 2013 Giro, which he won. His highest Tour result was third in 2012. His best results so far in the 2014 season were fifth in the Tour de Romandie and seventh in the Dauphiné. Valverde, who placed eighth in the 2013 Tour and won the 2009 Vuelta a España, had a number of wins in the 2014 season prior to the Tour, most notably, the Vuelta a Andalucía stage race and the La Flèche Wallonne one-day race.

The sprinters considered favourites for the points classification and wins on the flat or hilly bunch sprint finishes were Peter Sagan (Cannondale), Mark Cavendish (Omega Pharma–Quick-Step), André Greipel (Lotto–Belisol), Alexander Kristoff (Team Katusha) and Giant–Shimano riders Marcel Kittel and John Degenkolb. Winner of the points classification in the two previous Tours, Sagan, had won the E3 Harelbeke one-day race and won the points classifications in three stage races, the Tirreno–Adriatico, the Tour of California and the Tour de Suisse, during the 2014 season up until the Tour. Cavendish, who won the points classification in 2011, had nine wins so far in the season and had the full backing of his team. Greipel had amassed a total of twelve wins during the season prior to the Tour, but his team would have to share support for him and Van den Broeck. Kristoff had won the Milan–San Remo, and was considered a dark horse for the points classification. Kittel was seen as a top contender for the bunch sprints, as he won the most stages in the 2013 Tour, a total of four. He had an amassed seven wins so far in the season, two of which were in the Giro. It was thought that Degenkolb would be used by Giant–Shimano for the more challenging sprints. His major results of the season were first place in Gent–Wevelgem and second place in Paris–Roubaix, both one-day races.

== Route and stages ==
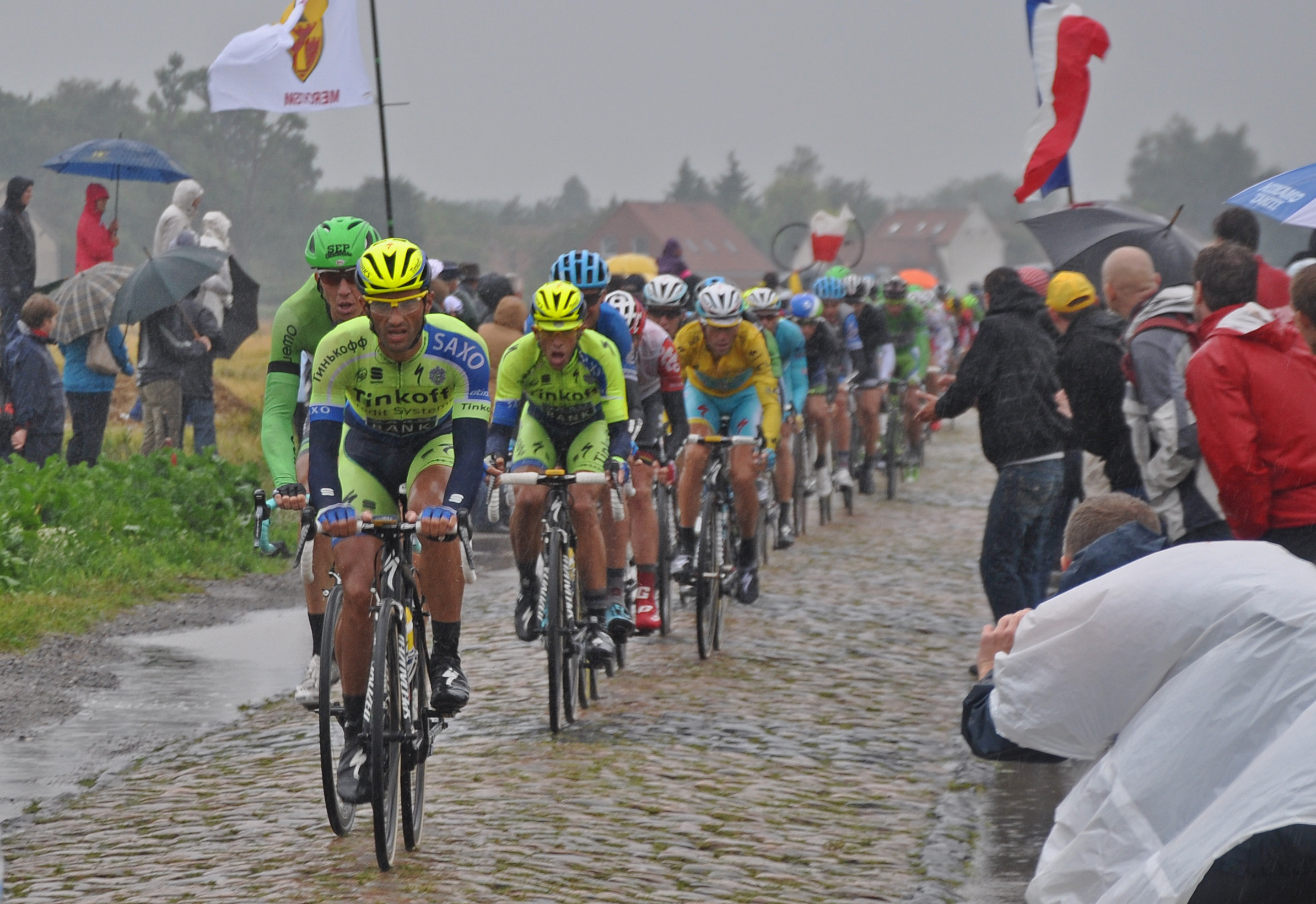
Stage five, between Ypres, Belgium, and Arenberg Porte du Hainaut, featured sett paving sections used in the one-day race Paris–Roubaix.

On 14 December 2012, the ASO announced that the English historic county of Yorkshire would host the 2014 edition's early stages (known as the Grand Départ). Further details of the first three stages held in the United Kingdom were released on 17 January 2013. This was the fourth Tour to contain stages in the United Kingdom, after 1974, 1994 and 2007. The entire route was announced by the ASO on 23 October 2013 at the official presentation at the Palais des Congrès in Paris. At the event, Stephen Roche, winner of the 1987 Tour, described the route as "fairly soft". Notable features of the route were the fifth stage's sections of sett paving, the five high altitude stage finishes and the lack of time trialing, with only stage twenty's 54 km (34 mi) individual time trial.

The first of the two stages held in Yorkshire started in Leeds and finished in Harrogate, with stage two held between York and Sheffield. After a transfer to the East Anglian city of Cambridge, the race went south to the finish in London. The Tour transferred across the English Channel to the start of stage four Le Touquet-Paris-Plage, with the finish in Lille. Stage five began in Ypres, Belgium, and finished back in France. The following three stages crossed the north-east to the Vosges Mountains for stages nine and ten. The eleventh stage took place between Besançon and Oyonnax through the Jura Mountains. Stage twelve headed west to Saint-Étienne, with the next stage moving back east into the Chartreuse Mountains, with the finish at the Alpine ski resort of Chamrousse. The fourteenth stage ended in the town of Risoul. The following stage took the race south to Nîmes. After a transfer to Carcassonne, the route moved into the Pyrenees for the next two stages. The nineteenth stage took a northerly direction to the department of Dordogne and the location of stage twenty. A long transfer took the Tour back to the north-east to finish with the Champs-Élysées stage in Paris.

There were 21 stages in the race, covering a total distance of 3,660.5 km (2,275 mi). The longest mass-start stage was the seventh at 234.5 km (146 mi), and stage 17 was the shortest at 124.5 km (77 mi). Nine stages were officially classified as flat, five as medium mountain and six as high mountain. Stage five, although classified as medium mountain, was flat with sett paving sections. There were five summit finishes: stage 10, to La Planche des Belles Filles; stage 13, to Chamrousse; stage 14, to Risoul; stage 17, to Saint-Lary Pla d’Adet; and stage 18, to Hautacam. The highest point of elevation in the race was the 2,360 m (7,740 ft)-high Col d'Izoard mountain pass on stage fourteen. It was among six hors catégorie (English: beyond category) rated climbs in the race. There were nine new stage start or finish locations. The rest days were after stage 10, in the Besançon, and after 15, in Carcassonne.

Stage characteristics and winners
Stage	Date	Course	Distance	Type	Winner
1	5 July	Leeds to Harrogate (United Kingdom)	190.5 km (118 mi)	Flat stage	Marcel Kittel (GER)
2	6 July	York to Sheffield (United Kingdom)	201 km (125 mi)	Medium mountain stage	Vincenzo Nibali (ITA)
3	7 July	Cambridge to London (United Kingdom)	155 km (96 mi)	Flat stage	Marcel Kittel (GER)
4	8 July	Le Touquet-Paris-Plage to Lille Metropole (Villeneuve-d'Ascq)	163.5 km (102 mi)	Flat stage	Marcel Kittel (GER)
5	9 July	Ypres (Belgium) to Arenberg Porte du Hainaut	152.5 km (95 mi) (Note: Four days before stage five, the race jury removed two of the nine sett paving sections due to bad weather. The total stage distance was reduced from 155.5 km (97 mi) to 152.5 km (95 mi).)	Medium mountain stage (Note: Although officially classified as medium mountain, stage five was flat with sett paving sections.)	Lars Boom (NED)
6	10 July	Arras to Reims	194 km (121 mi)	Flat stage	André Greipel (GER)
7	11 July	Épernay to Nancy	234.5 km (146 mi)	Flat stage	Matteo Trentin (ITA)
8	12 July	Tomblaine to Gérardmer La Mauselaine	161 km (100 mi)	Medium mountain stage	Blel Kadri (FRA)
9	13 July	Gérardmer to Mulhouse	170 km (106 mi)	Medium mountain stage	Tony Martin (GER)
10	14 July	Mulhouse to La Planche des Belles Filles	161.5 km (100 mi)	High mountain stage	Vincenzo Nibali (ITA)
	15 July	Besançon		Rest day	
11	16 July	Besançon to Oyonnax	187.5 km (117 mi)	Medium mountain stage	Tony Gallopin (FRA)
12	17 July	Bourg-en-Bresse to Saint-Étienne	185.5 km (115 mi)	Flat stage	Alexander Kristoff (NOR)
13	18 July	Saint-Étienne to Chamrousse	197.5 km (123 mi)	High mountain stage	Vincenzo Nibali (ITA)
14	19 July	Grenoble to Risoul	177 km (110 mi)	High mountain stage	Rafał Majka (POL)
15	20 July	Tallard to Nîmes	222 km (138 mi)	Flat stage	Alexander Kristoff (NOR)
	21 July	Carcassonne		Rest day	
16	22 July	Carcassonne to Bagnères-de-Luchon	237.5 km (148 mi)	High mountain stage	Michael Rogers (AUS)
17	23 July	Saint-Gaudens to Saint-Lary Pla d’Adet	124.5 km (77 mi)	High mountain stage	Rafał Majka (POL)
18	24 July	Pau to Hautacam	145.5 km (90 mi)	High mountain stage	Vincenzo Nibali (ITA)
19	25 July	Maubourguet Pays du Val d’Adour to Bergerac	208.5 km (130 mi)	Flat stage	Ramūnas Navardauskas (LTU)
20	26 July	Bergerac to Périgueux	54 km (34 mi)	Individual time trial	Tony Martin (GER)
21	27 July	Évry to Paris (Champs-Élysées)	137.5 km (85 mi)	Flat stage	Marcel Kittel (GER)
	Total		3,660.5 km (2,275 mi)		

== Race overview ==
=== Opening week and Vosges ===
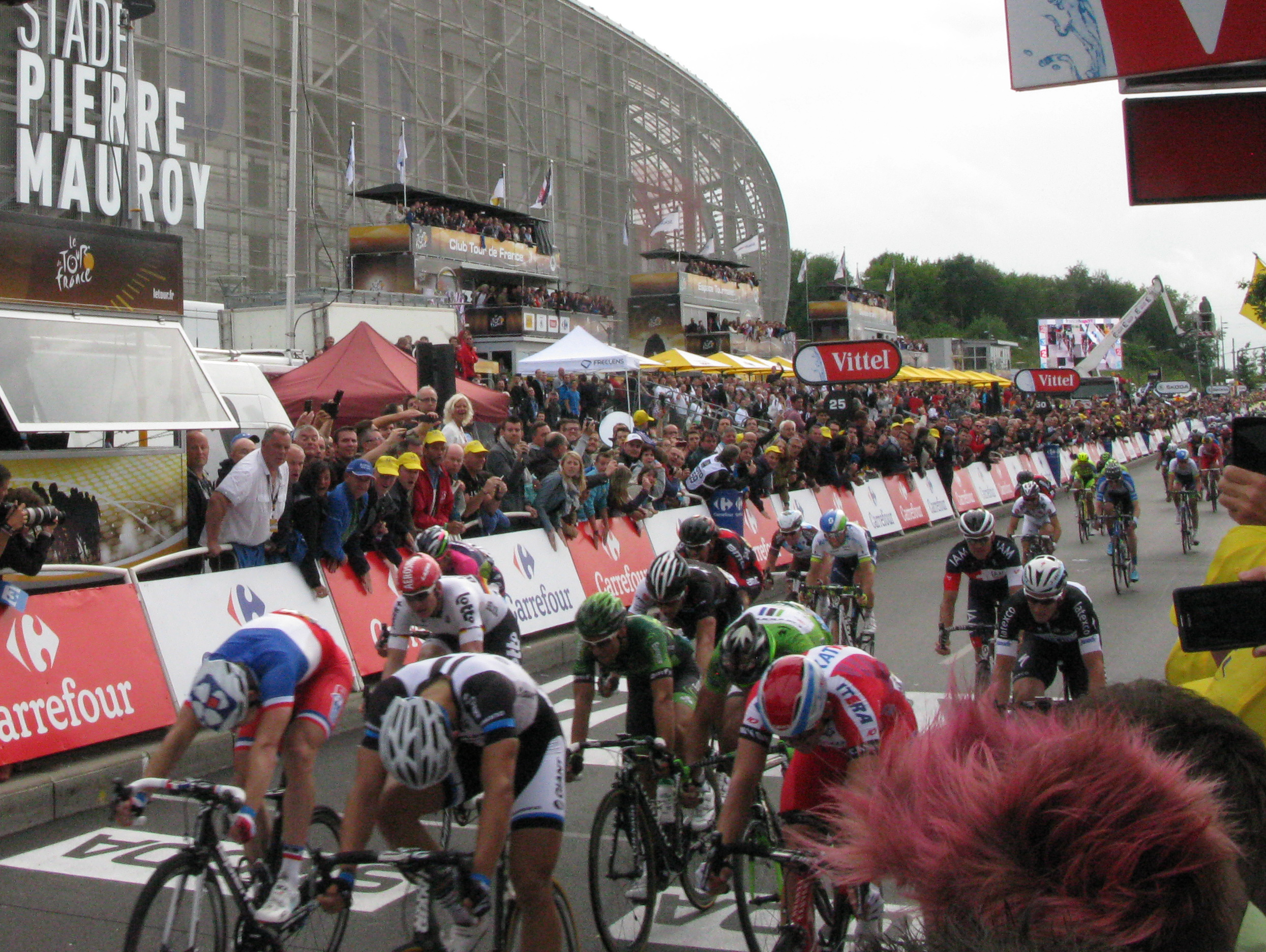
Marcel Kittel (Giant–Shimano) gained the third of his four race stage wins in stage four's bunch sprint finish at Lille's Stade Pierre-Mauroy stadium.

The first stage's bunch sprint finish was won by Marcel Kittel. A crash in the sprint caused Mark Cavendish, a favourite for the win, to fall; he did not start stage two. Kittel gained the race leader's yellow jersey and the green jersey as the leader of the points classification, with Jens Voigt taking the polka dot jersey as the leader of the mountains classification. In the following stage, likened to a "mini Liège-Bastogne-Liège", Vincenzo Nibali took the stage win and yellow jersey, attacking on Sheffield's hilly terrain with 2 km (1.2 mi) remaining. Peter Sagan took the green jersey and Cyril Lemoine (Cofidis) took the polka dot jersey. Stages three and four, finishing in London and Lille respectively, ended in bunch sprints and were both won by Kittel. Crashes in stages four and five forced pre-race favourite Chris Froome to abandon the race; his injuries were later revealed to be fractures to his left wrist and right hand. The weather was wet throughout the fifth stage, with the sett paving causing many crashes (although not Froome's). The fractured ending was won by an attack in the final 5 km (3.1 mi) by Lars Boom of Belkin Pro Cycling. Nibali, who placed third, extended his overall lead over his rivals, with Alberto Contador 2 min 37 s down. André Greipel won stage six's bunch sprint in Reims. Another bunch sprint took place at the end of the next stage, with the hilly finish decided by a photo finish between Sagan and the winner Matteo Trentin (Omega Pharma–Quick-Step).

Stage eight, the first at altitude, was taken by Ag2r–La Mondiale's Blel Kadri, who attacked from a breakaway group with 25 km (15.5 mi) to go; he managed to hold his lead over the chasing group of overall favourites, who came in over two minutes behind. His win put Kadri into the polka dot jersey. Another solo victory came the following day, when Tony Martin of Omega Pharma–Quick-Step dropped fellow breakaway rider Alessandro De Marchi (Cannondale) with 60 km (37.3 mi) remaining. A large group that formed in pursuit of the duo finished 2 min 45 s behind, with the unconcerned general classification contenders coming together in at 7 min 46 s down. The yellow jersey went to a rider from the first group, Lotto–Belisol's Tony Gallopin. Martin now led the mountains classification. Stage ten was the Tour's first high mountain stage. On the final climb to the finish at La Planche des Belles Filles, Nibali attacked from the group of overall contenders with 3 km (1.9 mi) remaining, passed two surviving riders from the day's early breakaway, and claimed his second stage win, which put him back in the yellow jersey. Joaquim Rodríguez (Team Katusha), one of the two breakaway riders, took the polka dot jersey. Contador crashed during the descent of the Petit Ballon, 95 km (59.0 mi) into the stage, forcing him to quit the race; it was later revealed that he had fractured his right tibia. The next day was the first rest day of the Tour.

=== Jura and Alps ===
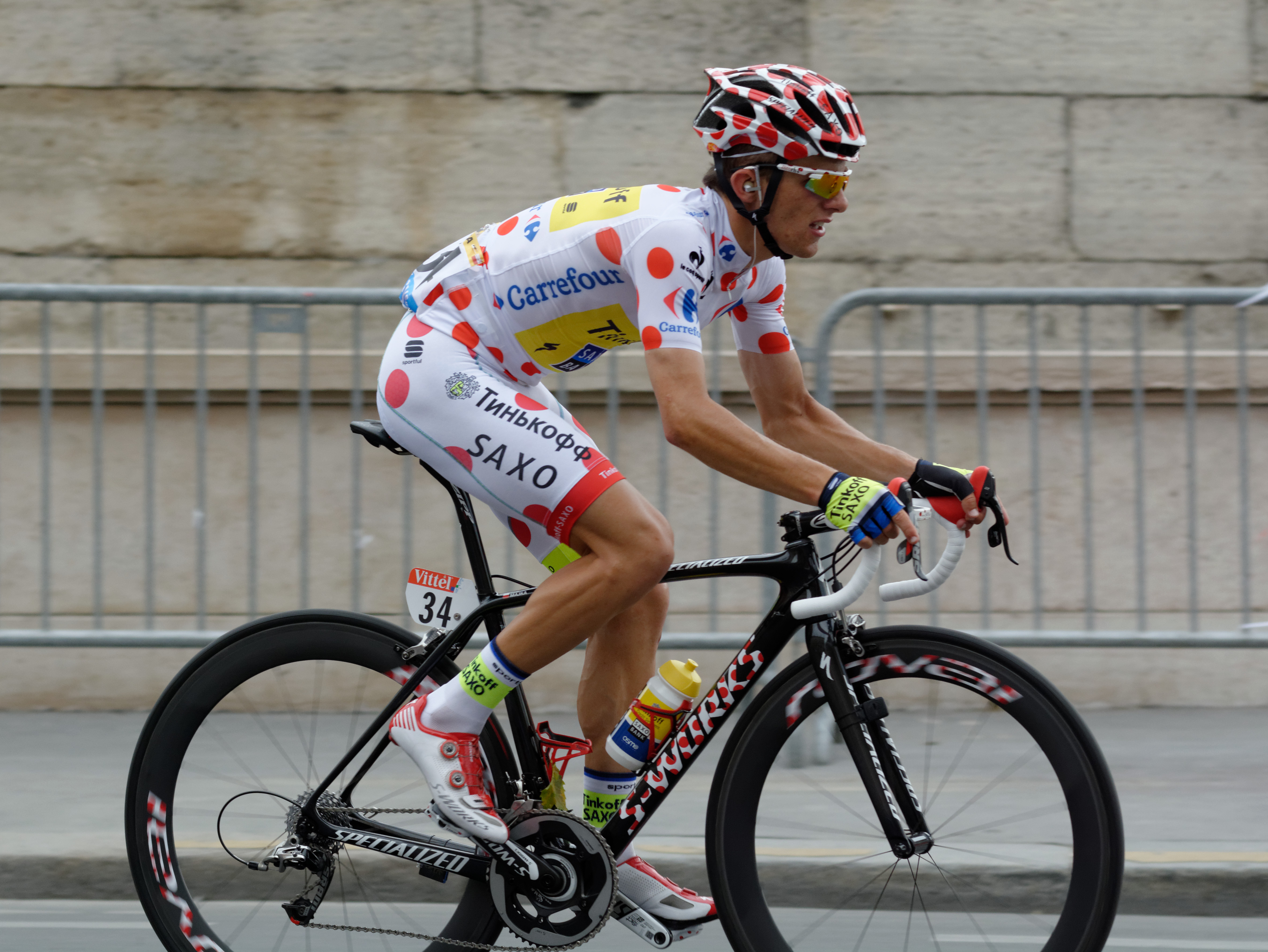
Rafał Majka's (Tinkoff–Saxo) victories in the high mountain stages of fourteen and seventeen helped him win the Tour's polka dot jersey as leader of the mountains classification.

Stage eleven's rolling terrain resulted in a final peloton that included mainly puncheurs; Gallopin won the stage after an attack 13 km (8.1 mi) from the finish in Oyonnax split the peloton and a second with 2.7 km (1.7 mi) remaining that successfully held off the chasers. The twelfth stage was won by Alexander Kristoff from a bunch sprint. Nibali took the stage win the following stage, making his move from the leading group in the final 3 km (1.9 mi) on the hors catégorie climb to Chamrousse. He extended his lead over the second-placed overall rider Alejandro Valverde to 3 min 37 s. Richie Porte, who was second overall before the stage and the new leader of Team Sky, lost around nine minutes and dropped to sixteenth. Nibali took the lead of the mountains classification. In stage fourteen, Rafał Majka (Tinkoff–Saxo) attacked from a reduced breakaway on the climb to the finish in Risoul with 10 km (6.2 mi) remaining and managed to hold off chasing the group of overall favourites and soloed to victory. Nibali, second in the stage, extended his lead further by one minute as Valverde lost time and Rodríguez regained the polka dot jersey. Kristoff won the bunch sprint in the transitional stage fifteen.

In the first of the three stages in the Pyrenees, the sixteenth, a breakaway group of 21 riders formed 75 km (46.6 mi) in. The group reduced to five after the final climb, the hors catégorie Port de Balès with 21 km (13.0 mi) remaining, out of which came the winner, Michael Rogers of (Tinkoff–Saxo), who attacked 3 km (1.9 mi) from finish in Bagnères-de-Luchon. The group of general classification favourites came in over eight minutes down. Majka led the mountains classification. The Tour's queen stage, the seventeenth, featured three first-category climbs and the hors catégorie climb to the finish at Saint-Lary Pla d’Adet. An early nine-strong breakaway was pulled back before the first climb by Team Katusha for their rider Rodríguez to take the mountains classification points and the temporary lead of the competition. This led to the formation of a large lead group which gradually split across the middle climbs. Rodriguez and Majka led the lead group race over the penultimate climb, with the former first. On the final climb, a group of four that had escaped were caught by Majka, who had dropped Rodríguez, and he soloed to claim his second stage win and the large number of points for the summit finish. Nibali had split apart the group of chasing overall favourites and came in third. Second-placed overall Valverde lost a minute to Thibaut Pinot in third.

=== Pyrenees and finale ===
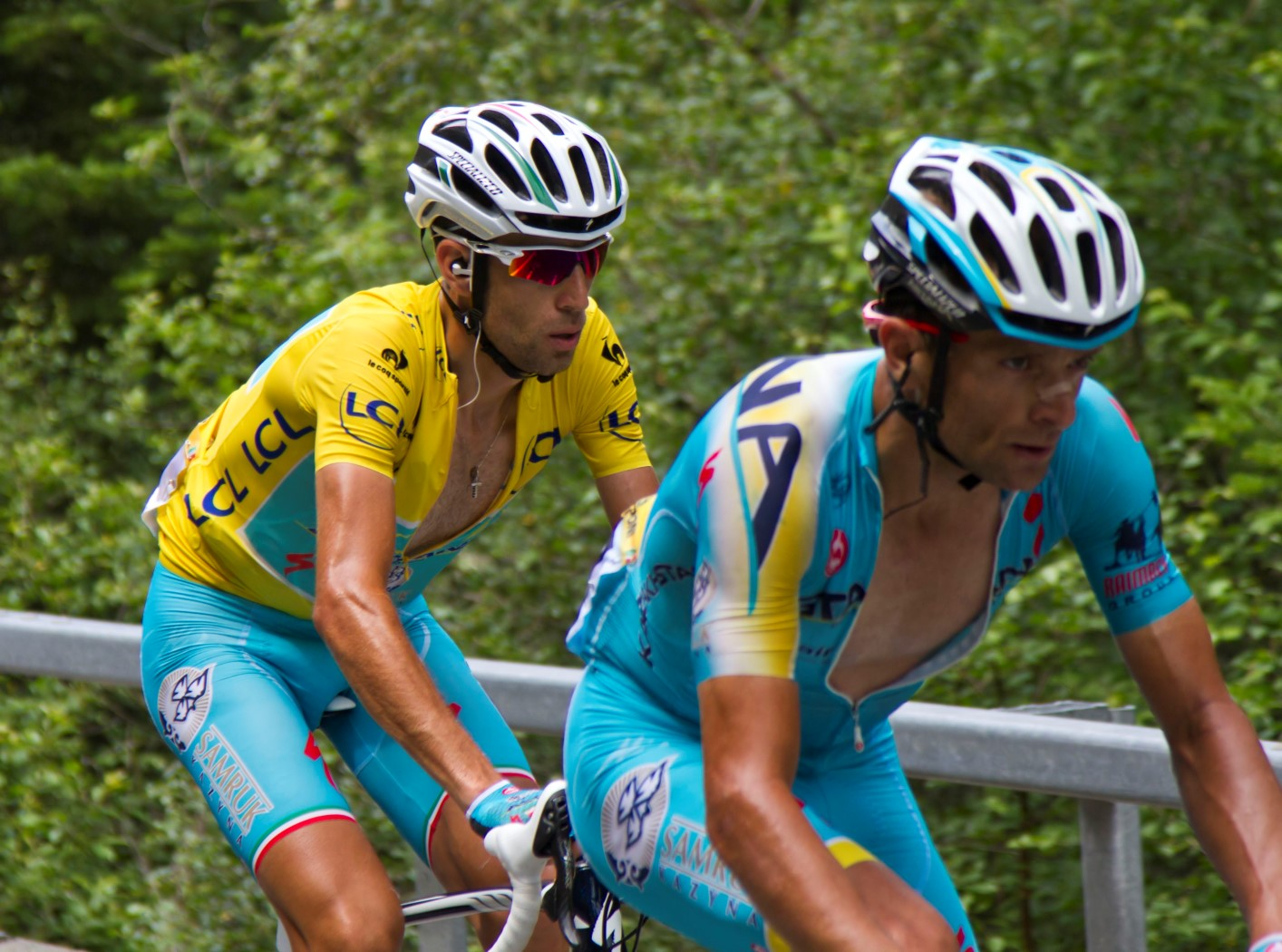
Astana rider Vincenzo Nibali, marshalled by teammate Michele Scarponi, before he won stage eighteen to increase his lead in the general classification's yellow jersey

The Tour's final mountain stage, the eighteenth, saw Nibali take his fourth victory of the race at Hautacam; his stage winning move came 9 km (5.6 mi) from the finish, on the climb to Hautacam. He finished 1 min 10 s ahead of a group which were four of his nearest general classification rivals, with the exception of Valverde, who lost further time and dropped to fourth overall, displaced by Thibaut Pinot and Jean-Christophe Péraud, respectively. Majka finished third in the stage and secured the mountains classification. In stage nineteen, Ramūnas Navardauskas of Garmin–Sharp attacked a peloton fractured by rain 13 km (8.1 mi) from the finish to win the stage. Martin claimed his second stage of the Tour in the penultimate stage's individual time trial. His time of 1h 6 min 21 s over the 54 km (33.6 mi) course was 1 min 39 s faster than second-placed Tom Dumoulin (Giant–Shimano). Nibali finished fourth, increasing his advantage.

In the final stage, Kittel secured a second successive victory on the Champs-Élysées in Paris, his fourth stage win of the race. Nibali finished the race to win the general classification by a margin of 7 min 39 s, the largest winning margin since Jan Ullrich in the 1997 Tour. Second and third respectively were Péraud and Pinot, with the latter 8 min 15 s down on Nibali. The points classification was won by Sagan with 431 points; Kristoff came second with 282 points. Majka finished with 181 points in the mountains classification, 13 ahead of second-placed Nibali. Pinot was the best young rider, with Romain Bardet (Ag2r–La Mondiale) second. The team classification was won by Ag2r–La Mondiale, 34 min 46 s ahead of second-placed Belkin Pro Cycling. Of the 198 starters, 164 reached the finish of the last stage in Paris.

== Classification leadership and minor prizes ==
There were four main individual classifications contested in the 2014 Tour de France, as well as a team competition. The most important was the general classification, which was calculated by adding each rider's finishing times on each stage. There were no time bonuses given at the end of stages for this edition of the Tour. If a crash had happened within the final 3 km (1.9 mi) of a stage, not including the time trial and summit finishes, the riders involved would have received the same time as the group they were in when the crash occurred. The rider with the lowest cumulative time was the winner of the general classification and was considered the overall winner of the Tour. The rider leading the classification wore a yellow jersey.

Points classification points for the top 15 positions by type
Type	1	2	3	4	5	6	7	8	9	10	11	12	13	14	15
Flat stage	45	35	30	26	22	20	18	16	14	12	10	8	6	4	2
Medium mountain stage	30	25	22	19	17	15	13	11	9	7	6	5	4	3	2
High mountain stage	20	17	15	13	11	10	9	8	7	6	5	4	3	2	1
Individual time trial	20	17	15	13	11	10	9	8	7	6	5	4	3	2	1
Intermediate sprint	20	17	15	13	11	10	9	8	7	6	5	4	3	2	1

The second classification was the points classification. Riders received points for finishing among the highest placed in a stage finish, or in intermediate sprints during the stage. The points available for each stage finish were determined by the stage's type. The leader was identified by a green jersey.

The third classification was the mountains classification. Points were awarded to the riders that reached the summit of the most difficult climbs first. The climbs were categorised as fourth-, third-, second-, first-category and hors catégorie, with the more difficult climbs rated lower. Double points were awarded on the summit finishes on stages 10, 13, 14, 17 and 18. The leader wore a white jersey with red polka dots.

The final individual classification was the young rider classification. This was calculated the same way as the general classification, but the classification was restricted to riders who were born on or after 1 January 1989. The leader wore a white jersey.

The final classification was a team classification. This was calculated using the finishing times of the best three riders per team on each stage; the leading team was the team with the lowest cumulative time. The number of stage victories and placings per team determined the outcome of a tie. The riders in the team that lead this classification were identified with yellow number bibs on the back of their jerseys and yellow helmets.

In addition, there was a combativity award given after each stage to the rider considered, by a jury, to have "made the greatest effort and who has demonstrated the best qualities of sportsmanship". No combativity awards were given for the time trial and the final stage. The winner wore a red number bib the following stage. At the conclusion of the Tour, Alessandro De Marchi won the overall super-combativity award, again, decided by a jury.

A total of €2,035,000 was awarded in cash prizes in the race. The overall winner of the general classification received €450,000, with the second and third placed riders got €200,000 and €100,000 respectively. All finishers of the race were awarded with money. The holders of the classifications benefited on each stage they led; the final winners of the points and mountains were given €25,000, while the best young rider and most combative rider got €20,000. The winners of the team classification received €50,000. There were also two special awards each with a prize of €5000, the Souvenir Henri Desgrange, given to first rider to pass the summit of the highest climb in the Tour, the Col d'Izoard in stage fourteen, and the Souvenir Jacques Goddet, given to the first rider to pass Goddet's memorial at the summit of the Col du Tourmalet in stage eighteen. Joaquim Rodríguez won the Henri Desgrange and Blel Kadri won the Jacques Goddet.

Classification leadership by stage
Stage	Winner	General classification	Points classification	Mountains classification	Young rider classification	Team classification	Combativity award
1	Marcel Kittel	Marcel Kittel	Marcel Kittel	Jens Voigt	Peter Sagan	Team Sky	Jens Voigt
2	Vincenzo Nibali	Vincenzo Nibali	Peter Sagan	Cyril Lemoine	Peter Sagan	Team Sky	Blel Kadri
3	Marcel Kittel	Vincenzo Nibali	Peter Sagan	Cyril Lemoine	Peter Sagan	Team Sky	Jan Bárta
4	Marcel Kittel	Vincenzo Nibali	Peter Sagan	Cyril Lemoine	Peter Sagan	Team Sky	Thomas Voeckler
5	Lars Boom	Vincenzo Nibali	Peter Sagan	Cyril Lemoine	Peter Sagan	Astana Pro Team	Lieuwe Westra
6	André Greipel	Vincenzo Nibali	Peter Sagan	Cyril Lemoine	Peter Sagan	Astana Pro Team	Luis Ángel Maté
7	Matteo Trentin	Vincenzo Nibali	Peter Sagan	Cyril Lemoine	Peter Sagan	Astana Pro Team	Martin Elmiger
8	Blel Kadri	Vincenzo Nibali	Peter Sagan	Blel Kadri	Michał Kwiatkowski	Astana Pro Team	Blel Kadri
9	Tony Martin	Tony Gallopin	Peter Sagan	Tony Martin	Michał Kwiatkowski	Astana Pro Team	Tony Martin
10	Vincenzo Nibali	Vincenzo Nibali	Peter Sagan	Joaquim Rodríguez	Romain Bardet	Ag2r–La Mondiale	Tony Martin
11	Tony Gallopin	Vincenzo Nibali	Peter Sagan	Joaquim Rodríguez	Romain Bardet	Ag2r–La Mondiale	Nicolas Roche
12	Alexander Kristoff	Vincenzo Nibali	Peter Sagan	Joaquim Rodríguez	Romain Bardet	Ag2r–La Mondiale	Simon Clarke
13	Vincenzo Nibali	Vincenzo Nibali	Peter Sagan	Vincenzo Nibali	Romain Bardet	Ag2r–La Mondiale	Alessandro De Marchi
14	Rafał Majka	Vincenzo Nibali	Peter Sagan	Joaquim Rodríguez	Romain Bardet	Ag2r–La Mondiale	Alessandro De Marchi
15	Alexander Kristoff	Vincenzo Nibali	Peter Sagan	Joaquim Rodríguez	Romain Bardet	Ag2r–La Mondiale	Martin Elmiger
16	Michael Rogers	Vincenzo Nibali	Peter Sagan	Rafał Majka	Thibaut Pinot	Ag2r–La Mondiale	Cyril Gautier
17	Rafał Majka	Vincenzo Nibali	Peter Sagan	Rafał Majka	Thibaut Pinot	Ag2r–La Mondiale	Romain Bardet
18	Vincenzo Nibali	Vincenzo Nibali	Peter Sagan	Rafał Majka	Thibaut Pinot	Ag2r–La Mondiale	Mikel Nieve
19	Ramūnas Navardauskas	Vincenzo Nibali	Peter Sagan	Rafał Majka	Thibaut Pinot	Ag2r–La Mondiale	Tom-Jelte Slagter
20	Tony Martin	Vincenzo Nibali	Peter Sagan	Rafał Majka	Thibaut Pinot	Ag2r–La Mondiale	no award
21	Marcel Kittel	Vincenzo Nibali	Peter Sagan	Rafał Majka	Thibaut Pinot	Ag2r–La Mondiale	no award
Final		Vincenzo Nibali	Peter Sagan	Rafał Majka	Thibaut Pinot	Ag2r–La Mondiale	Alessandro De Marchi

- In stage two, Bryan Coquard, who was third in the points classification, wore the green jersey, because Marcel Kittel (in first place) wore the yellow jersey as leader of the general classification and Peter Sagan (in second place) wore the white jersey as leader of the young rider classification during that stage.
- In stages three–five, Romain Bardet, who was second in the young rider classification, wore the white jersey, because Peter Sagan (in first place) wore the green jersey as leader of the points classification. Additionally, in stages six–seven, Michał Kwiatkowski wore the white jersey for the same reason.
- In stage fourteen, Joaquim Rodríguez, who was second in the mountains classification, wore the polka-dot jersey, because Vincenzo Nibali (in first place) wore the yellow jersey as leader of the general classification.

== Final standings ==
Legend
A yellow jersey.	Denotes the winner of the general classification	A green jersey.	Denotes the winner of the points classification
A white jersey with red polka dots.	Denotes the winner of the mountains classification	A white jersey.	Denotes the winner of the young rider classification
A white jersey with a yellow number bib.	Denotes the winner of the team classification	A white jersey with a red number bib.	Denotes the winner of the super-combativity award

=== General classification ===
Final general classification (1–10)
Rank	Rider	Team	Time
1	Vincenzo Nibali (ITA)	Astana	89h 59' 06"
2	Jean-Christophe Péraud (FRA)	Ag2r–La Mondiale	+ 7' 37"
3	Thibaut Pinot (FRA)	FDJ.fr	+ 8' 15"
4	Alejandro Valverde (ESP)	Movistar Team	+ 9' 40"
5	Tejay van Garderen (USA)	BMC Racing Team	+ 11' 24"
6	Romain Bardet (FRA)	Ag2r–La Mondiale	+ 11' 26"
7	Leopold König (CZE)	NetApp–Endura	+ 14' 32"
8	Haimar Zubeldia (ESP)	Trek Factory Racing	+ 17' 57"
9	Laurens ten Dam (NED)	Belkin Pro Cycling	+ 18' 11"
10	Bauke Mollema (NED)	Belkin Pro Cycling	+ 21' 15"

Final general classification (11–164)
Rank	Rider	Team	Time
11	Pierre Rolland (FRA)	Team Europcar	+ 23' 07"
12	Fränk Schleck (LUX)	Trek Factory Racing	+ 25' 48"
13	Jurgen Van den Broeck (BEL)	Lotto–Belisol	+ 34' 01"
14	Yuri Trofimov (RUS)	Team Katusha	+ 36' 41"
15	Steven Kruijswijk (NED)	Belkin Pro Cycling	+ 38' 15"
16	Brice Feillu (FRA)	Bretagne–Séché Environnement	+ 43' 59"
17	Chris Horner (USA)	Lampre–Merida	+ 44' 31"
18	Mikel Nieve (ESP)	Team Sky	+ 46' 31"
19	John Gadret (FRA)	Movistar Team	+ 47' 30"
20	Tanel Kangert (EST)	Astana	+ 52' 11"
21	Ben Gastauer (LUX)	Ag2r–La Mondiale	+ 58' 00"
22	Geraint Thomas (GBR)	Team Sky	+ 59' 14"
23	Richie Porte (AUS)	Team Sky	+ 1h 01' 08"
24	Jan Bakelants (BEL)	Omega Pharma–Quick-Step	+ 1h 06' 28"
25	Cyril Gautier (FRA)	Team Europcar	+ 1h 08' 47"
26	Michael Rogers (AUS)	Tinkoff–Saxo	+ 1h 17' 53"
27	Peter Velits (SVK)	BMC Racing Team	+ 1h 19' 38"
28	Michał Kwiatkowski (POL)	Omega Pharma–Quick-Step	+ 1h 21' 55"
29	Tony Gallopin (FRA)	Lotto–Belisol	+ 1h 29' 24"
30	Arnold Jeannesson (FRA)	FDJ.fr	+ 1h 33' 27"
31	Luis Ángel Maté (ESP)	Cofidis	+ 1h 33' 27"
32	Marcel Wyss (SUI)	IAM Cycling	+ 1h 38' 27"
33	Tom Dumoulin (NED)	Giant–Shimano	+ 1h 48' 00"
34	Sylvain Chavanel (FRA)	IAM Cycling	+ 1h 48' 13"
35	Peter Stetina (USA)	BMC Racing Team	+ 1h 52' 36"
36	Jakob Fuglsang (DEN)	Astana	+ 1h 54' 50"
37	Giovanni Visconti (ITA)	Movistar Team	+ 1h 56' 28"
38	Greg Van Avermaet (BEL)	BMC Racing Team	+ 1h 56' 34"
39	Nicolas Roche (IRL)	Tinkoff–Saxo	+ 1h 58' 45"
40	Bram Tankink (NED)	Belkin Pro Cycling	+ 1h 59' 02"
41	Ion Izagirre (ESP)	Movistar Team	+ 2h 00' 50"
42	Thomas Voeckler (FRA)	Team Europcar	+ 2h 08' 38"
43	Michael Schär (SUI)	BMC Racing Team	+ 2h 09' 43"
44	Rafał Majka (POL)	Tinkoff–Saxo	+ 2h 17' 53"
45	Amaël Moinard (FRA)	BMC Racing Team	+ 2h 19' 13"
46	Kristijan Đurasek (CRO)	Lampre–Merida	+ 2h 21' 18"
47	Tony Martin (GER)	Omega Pharma–Quick-Step	+ 2h 25' 35"
48	José Serpa (COL)	Lampre–Merida	+ 2h 29' 06"
49	Michele Scarponi (ITA)	Astana	+ 2h 31' 40"
50	Paul Voss (GER)	NetApp–Endura	+ 2h 32' 48"
51	Rudy Molard (FRA)	Cofidis	+ 2h 34' 22"
52	Alessandro De Marchi (ITA)	Cannondale	+ 2h 34' 54"
53	Ben King (USA)	Garmin–Sharp	+ 2h 41' 59"
54	Joaquim Rodríguez (ESP)	Team Katusha	+ 2h 45' 17"
55	Michał Gołaś (POL)	Omega Pharma–Quick-Step	+ 2h 49' 03"
56	Tom-Jelte Slagter (NED)	Garmin–Sharp	+ 2h 49' 20"
57	Jérémy Roy (FRA)	FDJ.fr	+ 2h 49' 28"
58	Jérôme Pineau (FRA)	IAM Cycling	+ 2h 51' 46"
59	Mikaël Cherel (FRA)	Ag2r–La Mondiale	+ 2h 52' 00"
60	Peter Sagan (SVK)	Cannondale	+ 2h 52' 52"
61	Jesús Herrada (ESP)	Movistar Team	+ 2h 53' 18"
62	Florian Guillou (FRA)	Bretagne–Séché Environnement	+ 2h 53' 20"
63	Markel Irizar (ESP)	Trek Factory Racing	+ 2h 53' 44"
64	Adam Hansen (AUS)	Lotto–Belisol	+ 2h 54' 18"
65	Yukiya Arashiro (JPN)	Team Europcar	+ 2h 55' 27"
66	Matteo Montaguti (ITA)	Ag2r–La Mondiale	+ 2h 55' 47"
67	Jens Keukeleire (BEL)	Orica–GreenEDGE	+ 2h 56' 12"
68	Bartosz Huzarski (POL)	NetApp–Endura	+ 2h 58' 00"
69	Daniel Oss (ITA)	BMC Racing Team	+ 2h 58' 41"
70	Michael Albasini (SUI)	Orica–GreenEDGE	+ 3h 05' 51"
71	Jan Bárta (CZE)	NetApp–Endura	+ 3h 07' 18"
72	Tiago Machado (POR)	NetApp–Endura	+ 3h 08' 03"
73	Kévin Reza (FRA)	Team Europcar	+ 3h 08' 12"
74	Johan Vansummeren (BEL)	Garmin–Sharp	+ 3h 08' 40"
75	Martin Elmiger (SUI)	IAM Cycling	+ 3h 12' 10"
76	Mathieu Ladagnous (FRA)	FDJ.fr	+ 3h 14' 41"
77	Nicolas Edet (FRA)	Cofidis	+ 3h 19' 34"
78	Anthony Delaplace (FRA)	Bretagne–Séché Environnement	+ 3h 20' 48"
79	Lieuwe Westra (NED)	Astana	+ 3h 21' 04"
80	Marco Marcato (ITA)	Cannondale	+ 3h 21' 16"
81	Imanol Erviti (ESP)	Movistar Team	+ 3h 22' 48"
82	Lars Bak (DEN)	Lotto–Belisol	+ 3h 23' 41"
83	Perrig Quéméneur (FRA)	Team Europcar	+ 3h 25' 46"
84	Blel Kadri (FRA)	Ag2r–La Mondiale	+ 3h 26' 23"
85	Sébastien Reichenbach (SUI)	IAM Cycling	+ 3h 27' 52"
86	Vasil Kiryienka (BLR)	Team Sky	+ 3h 30' 23"
87	Nelson Oliveira (POR)	Lampre–Merida	+ 3h 30' 36"
88	Rein Taaramäe (EST)	Cofidis	+ 3h 35' 01"
89	Sérgio Paulinho (POR)	Tinkoff–Saxo	+ 3h 36' 33"
90	Samuel Dumoulin (FRA)	Ag2r–La Mondiale	+ 3h 38' 04"
91	Rubén Plaza (ESP)	Movistar Team	+ 3h 38' 27"
92	Koen de Kort (NED)	Giant–Shimano	+ 3h 38' 52"
93	Matteo Trentin (ITA)	Omega Pharma–Quick-Step	+ 3h 38' 56"
94	Niki Terpstra (NED)	Omega Pharma–Quick-Step	+ 3h 39' 04"
95	Andriy Hrivko (UKR)	Astana	+ 3h 39' 28"
96	Daniele Bennati (ITA)	Tinkoff–Saxo	+ 3h 40' 46"
97	Lars Boom (NED)	Belkin Pro Cycling	+ 3h 41' 24"
98	Matthew Busche (USA)	Trek Factory Racing	+ 3h 41' 58"
99	Sébastien Minard (FRA)	Ag2r–La Mondiale	+ 3h 42' 23"
100	Gatis Smukulis (LAT)	Team Katusha	+ 3h 43' 25"
101	Grégory Rast (SUI)	Trek Factory Racing	+ 3h 43' 37"
102	Cédric Pineau (FRA)	FDJ.fr	+ 3h 44' 22"
103	Florian Vachon (FRA)	Bretagne–Séché Environnement	+ 3h 44' 40"
104	Bryan Coquard (FRA)	Team Europcar	+ 3h 44' 45"
105	David López (ESP)	Team Sky	+ 3h 45' 13"
106	Sep Vanmarcke (BEL)	Belkin Pro Cycling	+ 3h 45' 54"
107	Alexandre Pichot (FRA)	Team Europcar	+ 3h 46' 35"
108	Jens Voigt (GER)	Trek Factory Racing	+ 3h 46' 37"
109	Julien Simon (FRA)	Cofidis	+ 3h 46' 56"
110	Cyril Lemoine (FRA)	Cofidis	+ 3h 47' 16"
111	Jürgen Roelandts (BEL)	Lotto–Belisol	+ 3h 52' 39"
112	Maciej Bodnar (POL)	Cannondale	+ 3h 52' 52"
113	Simon Clarke (AUS)	Orica–GreenEDGE	+ 3h 55' 38"
114	Beñat Intxausti (ESP)	Movistar Team	+ 3h 55' 53"
115	Jean-Marc Bideau (FRA)	Bretagne–Séché Environnement	+ 3h 58' 08"
116	Roy Curvers (NED)	Giant–Shimano	+ 3h 58' 23"
117	Maarten Wynants (BEL)	Belkin Pro Cycling	+ 4h 01' 09"
118	Fabio Sabatini (ITA)	Cannondale	+ 4h 01' 21"
119	Matteo Tosatto (ITA)	Tinkoff–Saxo	+ 4h 01' 53"
120	Christophe Riblon (FRA)	Ag2r–La Mondiale	+ 4h 04' 00"
121	Christian Meier (CAN)	Orica–GreenEDGE	+ 4h 05' 13"
122	Luke Durbridge (AUS)	Orica–GreenEDGE	+ 4h 05' 59"
123	John Degenkolb (GER)	Giant–Shimano	+ 4h 06' 42"
124	José Mendes (POR)	NetApp–Endura	+ 4h 07' 34"
125	Alexander Kristoff (NOR)	Team Katusha	+ 4h 11' 46"
126	Bernhard Eisel (AUT)	Team Sky	+ 4h 13' 21"
127	Alex Howes (USA)	Garmin–Sharp	+ 4h 18' 43"
128	Yohann Gène (FRA)	Team Europcar	+ 4h 19' 11"
129	Maxim Iglinsky (KAZ)	Astana	+ 4h 22' 07"
130	Dmitriy Gruzdev (KAZ)	Astana	+ 4h 22' 33"
131	Svein Tuft (CAN)	Orica–GreenEDGE	+ 4h 22' 52"
132	Arnaud Gérard (FRA)	Bretagne–Séché Environnement	+ 4h 24' 15"
133	Tom Leezer (NED)	Belkin Pro Cycling	+ 4h 24' 21"
134	Michael Mørkøv (DEN)	Tinkoff–Saxo	+ 4h 26' 29"
135	Kristijan Koren (SLO)	Cannondale	+ 4h 29' 14"
136	Luca Paolini (ITA)	Team Katusha	+ 4h 29' 43"
137	Jack Bauer (NZL)	Garmin–Sharp	+ 4h 29' 57"
138	Armindo Fonseca (FRA)	Bretagne–Séché Environnement	+ 4h 30' 52"
139	Roger Kluge (GER)	IAM Cycling	+ 4h 33' 45"
140	Sebastian Langeveld (NED)	Garmin–Sharp	+ 4h 34' 29"
141	Ramūnas Navardauskas (LTU)	Garmin–Sharp	+ 4h 37' 42"
142	Mark Renshaw (AUS)	Omega Pharma–Quick-Step	+ 4h 39' 03"
143	Mickaël Delage (FRA)	FDJ.fr	+ 4h 39' 40"
144	Andreas Schillinger (GER)	NetApp–Endura	+ 4h 40' 06"
145	Marcel Sieberg (GER)	Lotto–Belisol	+ 4h 41' 21"
146	Albert Timmer (NED)	Giant–Shimano	+ 4h 42' 28"
147	Alessandro Vanotti (ITA)	Astana	+ 4h 42' 48"
148	Alessandro Petacchi (ITA)	Omega Pharma–Quick-Step	+ 4h 44' 47"
149	André Greipel (GER)	Lotto–Belisol	+ 4h 44' 54"
150	Romain Feillu (FRA)	Bretagne–Séché Environnement	+ 4h 45' 04"
151	Zak Dempster (AUS)	NetApp–Endura	+ 4h 45' 04"
152	Benoît Jarrier (FRA)	Bretagne–Séché Environnement	+ 4h 46' 28"
153	Danny Pate (USA)	Team Sky	+ 4h 47' 52"
154	Marcus Burghardt (GER)	BMC Racing Team	+ 4h 48' 40"
155	Tom Veelers (NED)	Giant–Shimano	+ 4h 53' 23"
156	Adrien Petit (FRA)	Cofidis	+ 4h 58' 20"
157	Vladimir Isaichev (RUS)	Team Katusha	+ 4h 58' 30"
158	William Bonnet (FRA)	FDJ.fr	+ 4h 59' 57"
159	Arnaud Démare (FRA)	FDJ.fr	+ 5h 00' 29"
160	Jean-Marc Marino (FRA)	Cannondale	+ 5h 03' 46"
161	Marcel Kittel (GER)	Giant–Shimano	+ 5h 06' 27"
162	Elia Viviani (ITA)	Cannondale	+ 5h 10' 40"
163	Davide Cimolai (ITA)	Lampre–Merida	+ 5h 11' 58"
164	Ji Cheng (CHN)	Giant–Shimano	+ 6h 02' 24"

=== Points classification ===
Final points classification (1–10)
Rank	Rider	Team	Points
1	Peter Sagan (SVK)	Cannondale	431
2	Alexander Kristoff (NOR)	Team Katusha	282
3	Bryan Coquard (FRA)	Team Europcar	271
4	Marcel Kittel (GER)	Giant–Shimano	222
5	Mark Renshaw (AUS)	Omega Pharma–Quick-Step	211
6	Vincenzo Nibali (ITA)	Astana	182
7	André Greipel (GER)	Lotto–Belisol	169
8	Ramūnas Navardauskas (LTU)	Garmin–Sharp	157
9	Greg Van Avermaet (BEL)	BMC Racing Team	153
10	Samuel Dumoulin (FRA)	Ag2r–La Mondiale	117

=== Mountains classification ===
Final mountains classification (1–10)
Rank	Rider	Team	Points
1	Rafał Majka (POL)	Tinkoff–Saxo	181
2	Vincenzo Nibali (ITA)	Astana	168
3	Joaquim Rodríguez (ESP)	Team Katusha	112
4	Thibaut Pinot (FRA)	FDJ.fr	89
5	Jean-Christophe Péraud (FRA)	Ag2r–La Mondiale	85
6	Alessandro De Marchi (ITA)	Cannondale	78
7	Thomas Voeckler (FRA)	Team Europcar	61
8	Giovanni Visconti (ITA)	Movistar Team	54
9	Alejandro Valverde (ESP)	Movistar Team	48
10	Tejay van Garderen (USA)	BMC Racing Team	48

=== Young rider classification ===
Final young rider classification (1–10)
Rank	Rider	Team	Time
1	Thibaut Pinot (FRA)	FDJ.fr	90h 07' 21"
2	Romain Bardet (FRA)	Ag2r–La Mondiale	+ 3' 11"
3	Michał Kwiatkowski (POL)	Omega Pharma–Quick-Step	+ 1h 13' 40"
4	Tom Dumoulin (NED)	Giant–Shimano	+ 1h 39' 45"
5	Ion Izagirre (ESP)	Movistar Team	+ 1h 52' 35"
6	Rafał Majka (POL)	Tinkoff–Saxo	+ 2h 09' 38"
7	Rudy Molard (FRA)	Cofidis	+ 2h 26' 07"
8	Ben King (USA)	Garmin–Sharp	+ 2h 33' 44"
9	Tom-Jelte Slagter (NED)	Garmin–Sharp	+ 2h 41' 05"
10	Peter Sagan (SVK)	Cannondale	+ 2h 44' 37"

=== Team classification ===
Final team classification (1–10)
Rank	Team	Time
1	(France) Ag2r–La Mondiale	270h 27' 02"
2	(Netherlands) Belkin Pro Cycling	+ 34' 46"
3	(Spain) Movistar Team	+ 1h 06' 10"
4	(United States) BMC Racing Team	+ 1h 07' 51"
5	(France) Team Europcar	+ 1h 34' 57"
6	(Kazakhstan) Astana	+ 1h 36' 27"
7	(United Kingdom) Team Sky	+ 1h 40' 36"
8	(United States) Trek Factory Racing	+ 2h 06' 00"
9	(France) FDJ.fr	+ 2h 30' 37"
10	(Italy) Lampre–Merida	+ 2h 32' 46"

== UCI World Tour rankings ==
Riders from the ProTeams competing individually, as well as for their teams and nations, for points that contributed towards the World Tour rankings. Points were awarded to the top twenty finishers in the general classification and to the top five finishers in each stage. The 200 points accrued by Vincenzo Nibali moved him from fortieth position to second in the individual ranking. Movistar Team retained their lead of the team ranking, ahead of second-placed Ag2r–La Mondiale. Spain remained as leaders of the nation ranking, with Italy second.

UCI World Tour individual ranking on 27 July 2014 (1–10)
Rank	Prev.	Name	Team	Points
1	1	Alberto Contador (ESP)	Tinkoff–Saxo	407
2	40	Vincenzo Nibali (ITA)	Astana	392
3	6	Alejandro Valverde (ESP)	Movistar Team	382
4	2	Nairo Quintana (COL)	Movistar Team	345
5	22	Jean-Christophe Péraud (FRA)	Ag2r–La Mondiale	300
6	5	Fabian Cancellara (SUI)	Trek Factory Racing	274
7	4	Simon Gerrans (AUS)	Orica–GreenEDGE	268
8	3	Rui Costa (POR)	Lampre–Merida	268
9	10	Peter Sagan (SVK)	Cannondale	257
10	7	Michał Kwiatkowski (POL)	Omega Pharma–Quick-Step	257

== See also ==
- 2014 in men's road cycling
- 2014 in sports

== Bibliography ==
- "Race regulations" (PDF). Tour de France. Paris: Amaury Sport Organisation. 2014. Archived from the original (PDF) on 9 August 2016.
- UCI cycling regulations (PDF). Part 2, road races. Aigle, Switzerland: Union Cycliste Internationale. 29 October 2014. Archived from the original (PDF) on 29 October 2014.
