= 2018 Arctic Race of Norway =

2018 UCI Europe Tour

Race details
- Dates: 16–19 August
- Stages: 4
- Distance: 718.5 km (446.5 mi)

Results
Jersey awarded to the overall winner	Winner	Sergey Chernetskiy (RUS)	(Astana)
	Second	Markus Hoelgaard (NOR)	(Joker Icopal)
	Third	Colin Joyce (USA)	(Rally Cycling)
Jersey awarded to the points classification winner	Points	Mathieu van der Poel (NED)	(Corendon–Circus)
Jersey awarded to the mountains classification winner	Mountains	Sindre Skjøstad Lunke (NOR)	(Fortuneo–Samsic)
Jersey awarded to the youth classification winner	Youth	Markus Hoelgaard (NOR)	(Joker Icopal)
	Team	BMC Racing Team	

The 2018 Arctic Race of Norway was a four-stage cycling stage race that took place in Norway between 16 and 19 August. It was the sixth edition of the Arctic Race of Norway and is rated as a 2.HC event as part of the UCI Europe Tour.

== Race schedule ==
List of stages
Stage	Date	Course	Distance	Type	Winner
1	16 August	Vadsø to Kirkenes	184 km (114 mi)	Hilly stage	Mathieu van der Poel (NED)
2	17 August	Tana to Kjøllefjord	195 km (121 mi)	Hilly stage	Colin Joyce (USA)
3	18 August	Honningsvåg to Hammerfest	194 km (121 mi)	Flat stage	Adam Ťoupalík (CZE)
4	19 August	Kvalsund to Alta	145.5 km (90 mi)	Hilly stage	Mathieu van der Poel (NED)

== Teams ==
19 teams were invited to take part in the race. Five of these were UCI WorldTeams; 12 were UCI Professional Continental teams; four were UCI Continental teams. Each team was allowed to enter six riders, three teams only entered five, therefore the peloton at the start of the race was made up of 123 riders.

UCI WorldTeams

- Astana
- BMC Racing Team
- Team Dimension Data
- Team Katusha–Alpecin

UCI Professional Continental teams

- Cofidis
- Corendon–Circus
- Delko–Marseille Provence KTM
- Direct Énergie
- Fortuneo–Samsic
- Holowesko Citadel p/b Arapahoe Resources
- Israel Cycling Academy
- Rally Cycling
- Sport Vlaanderen–Baloise
- Vital Concept
- Wanty–Groupe Gobert
- WB Aqua Protect Veranclassic

UCI Continental teams

- Joker Icopal
- Team Coop
- Uno-X Norwegian Development Team

== Stages ==
=== Stage 1 ===
16 August 2018 – Vadsø to Kirkenes, 184 km (114 mi)

Result of stage 1
Rank	Rider	Team	Time
1	Mathieu van der Poel (NED)	Corendon–Circus	3h 50' 19"
2	Sergey Chernetskiy (RUS)	Astana	s.t.
3	Benjamin Declercq (BEL)	Sport Vlaanderen–Baloise	s.t.
4	Markus Hoelgaard (NOR)	Joker Icopal	s.t.
5	Quentin Pacher (FRA)	Vital Concept	s.t.
6	Alberto Bettiol (ITA)	BMC Racing Team	s.t.
7	Guillaume Martin (FRA)	Wanty–Groupe Gobert	s.t.
8	Kenneth Vanbilsen (BEL)	Cofidis	s.t.
9	Krister Hagen (NOR)	Team Coop	+ 5"
10	Colin Joyce (USA)	Rally Cycling	+ 5"
Source: ProCyclingStats

General classification after stage 1
Rank	Rider	Team	Time
1	Mathieu van der Poel (NED)	Corendon–Circus	3h 50' 19"
2	Sergey Chernetskiy (RUS)	Astana	+ 4"
3	Benjamin Declercq (BEL)	Sport Vlaanderen–Baloise	+ 6"
4	Alberto Bettiol (ITA)	BMC Racing Team	+ 9"
5	Markus Hoelgaard (NOR)	Joker Icopal	+ 10"
6	Quentin Pacher (FRA)	Vital Concept	+ 10"
7	Guillaume Martin (FRA)	Wanty–Groupe Gobert	+ 10"
8	Kenneth Vanbilsen (BEL)	Cofidis	+ 10"
9	Krister Hagen (NOR)	Team Coop	+ 15"
10	Colin Joyce (USA)	Rally Cycling	+ 15"
Source: ProCyclingStats

=== Stage 2 ===
17 August 2018 – Tana to Kjøllefjord, 195 km (121 mi)

Stage 2 result
Rank	Rider	Team	Time
1	Colin Joyce (USA)	Rally Cycling	4h 20' 24"
2	Dennis van Winden (NED)	Israel Cycling Academy	s.t.
3	Markus Hoelgaard (NOR)	Joker Icopal	s.t.
4	Danilo Wyss (SUI)	BMC Racing Team	s.t.
5	Sergey Chernetskiy (RUS)	Astana	s.t.
6	Laurent Pichon (FRA)	Fortuneo–Samsic	s.t.
7	Carl Fredrik Hagen (NOR)	Joker Icopal	s.t.
8	Steff Cras (BEL)	Team Katusha–Alpecin	s.t.
9	Jakob Fuglsang (DEN)	Astana	s.t.
10	Nicolas Roche (IRL)	BMC Racing Team	s.t.
Source: ProCyclingStats

General classification after Stage 2
Rank	Rider	Team	Time
1	Sergey Chernetskiy (RUS)	Astana	8h 10' 34"
2	Colin Joyce (USA)	Rally Cycling	+ 4"
3	Markus Hoelgaard (NOR)	Joker Icopal	+ 5"
4	Danilo Wyss (SUI)	BMC Racing Team	+ 19"
5	Alberto Bettiol (ITA)	BMC Racing Team	+ 23"
6	Carl Fredrik Hagen (NOR)	Joker Icopal	+ 32"
7	Dennis van Winden (NED)	Israel Cycling Academy	+ 32"
8	Nicolas Roche (IRL)	BMC Racing Team	+ 33"
9	Laurent Pichon (FRA)	Fortuneo–Samsic	+ 34"
10	Jakob Fuglsang (DEN)	Astana	+ 34"
Source: ProCyclingStats

=== Stage 3 ===
18 August 2018 – Honningsvåg to Hammerfest, 194 km (121 mi)

Stage 3 result
Rank	Rider	Team	Time
1	Adam Ťoupalík (CZE)	Corendon–Circus	4h 24' 08"
2	Mathieu van der Poel (NED)	Corendon–Circus	+ 2"
3	Sergey Chernetskiy (RUS)	Astana	+ 2"
4	Quentin Pacher (FRA)	Vital Concept	+ 2"
5	Odd Christian Eiking (NOR)	Wanty–Groupe Gobert	+ 2"
6	Markus Hoelgaard (NOR)	Joker Icopal	+ 2"
7	Colin Joyce (USA)	Rally Cycling	+ 2"
8	Benjamin Declercq (BEL)	Sport Vlaanderen–Baloise	+ 2"
9	Kevin Deltombe (BEL)	Sport Vlaanderen–Baloise	+ 2"
10	Nicolai Brøchner (DEN)	Holowesko Citadel p/b Arapahoe Resources	+ 2"
Source: ProCyclingStats

General classification after Stage 3
Rank	Rider	Team	Time
1	Sergey Chernetskiy (RUS)	Astana	12h 34' 40"
2	Markus Hoelgaard (NOR)	Joker Icopal	+ 7"
3	Colin Joyce (USA)	Rally Cycling	+ 8"
4	Danilo Wyss (SUI)	BMC Racing Team	+ 23"
5	Nicolas Roche (IRL)	BMC Racing Team	+ 37"
6	Laurent Pichon (FRA)	Fortuneo–Samsic	+ 38"
7	Carl Fredrik Hagen (NOR)	Joker Icopal	+ 38"
8	Steff Cras (BEL)	Team Katusha–Alpecin	+ 38"
9	Dennis van Winden (NED)	Israel Cycling Academy	+ 52"
10	Michael Schär (SUI)	BMC Racing Team	+ 53"
Source: ProCyclingStats

=== Stage 4 ===
19 August 2018 – Kvalsund to Alta, 145.5 km (90.4 mi)

Result of stage 4
Rank	Rider	Team	Time
1	Mathieu van der Poel (NED)	Corendon–Circus	3h 21' 02"
2	Sondre Holst Enger (NOR)	Israel Cycling Academy	s.t.
3	Quentin Pacher (FRA)	Vital Concept	s.t.
4	Loïc Chetout (FRA)	Cofidis	s.t.
5	Benjamin Declercq (BEL)	Sport Vlaanderen–Baloise	s.t.
6	Laurent Pichon (FRA)	Fortuneo–Samsic	s.t.
7	Odd Christian Eiking (NOR)	Wanty–Groupe Gobert	s.t.
8	Sergey Chernetskiy (RUS)	Astana	s.t.
9	Nicolai Brøchner (DEN)	Holowesko Citadel p/b Arapahoe Resources	s.t.
10	Nicolas Roche (IRL)	BMC Racing Team	s.t.
Source: ProCyclingStats

Final general classification
Rank	Rider	Team	Time
1	Sergey Chernetskiy (RUS)	Astana	15h 55' 42"
2	Markus Hoelgaard (NOR)	Joker Icopal	+ 11"
3	Colin Joyce (USA)	Rally Cycling	+ 12"
4	Danilo Wyss (SUI)	BMC Racing Team	+ 27"
5	Nicolas Roche (IRL)	BMC Racing Team	+ 37"
6	Laurent Pichon (FRA)	Fortuneo–Samsic	+ 38"
7	Steff Cras (BEL)	Team Katusha–Alpecin	+ 42"
8	Carl Fredrik Hagen (NOR)	Joker Icopal	+ 42"
9	Dmitriy Strakhov (RUS)	Team Katusha–Alpecin	+ 56"
10	Dennis van Winden (NED)	Israel Cycling Academy	+ 56"
Source: ProCyclingStats

== Classifications ==
The race included four main classifications: the general classification, the points classification, the mountains classification and the youth classification. There was also an award for the most aggressive rider on each stage and a team classification.

Stage	Winner	General classification	Points classification	Mountains classification	Youth classification	Team classification	Combativity award
1	Mathieu van der Poel	Mathieu van der Poel	Mathieu van der Poel	Anders Skaarseth	Mathieu van der Poel	BMC Racing Team	Bert De Backer
2	Colin Joyce	Sergey Chernetskiy	Sergey Chernetskiy	Sindre Skjøstad Lunke	Colin Joyce	BMC Racing Team	Jakob Fuglsang
3	Adam Ťoupalík	Sergey Chernetskiy	Sergey Chernetskiy	Sindre Skjøstad Lunke	Markus Hoelgaard	BMC Racing Team	Adam Ťoupalík
4	Mathieu van der Poel	Sergey Chernetskiy	Mathieu van der Poel	Sindre Skjøstad Lunke	Markus Hoelgaard	BMC Racing Team	Kristoffer Skjerping
Final		Sergey Chernetskiy	Mathieu van der Poel	Sindre Skjøstad Lunke	Markus Hoelgaard	BMC Racing Team	not awarded
