= Sindre Lunke =

Norwegian cyclist

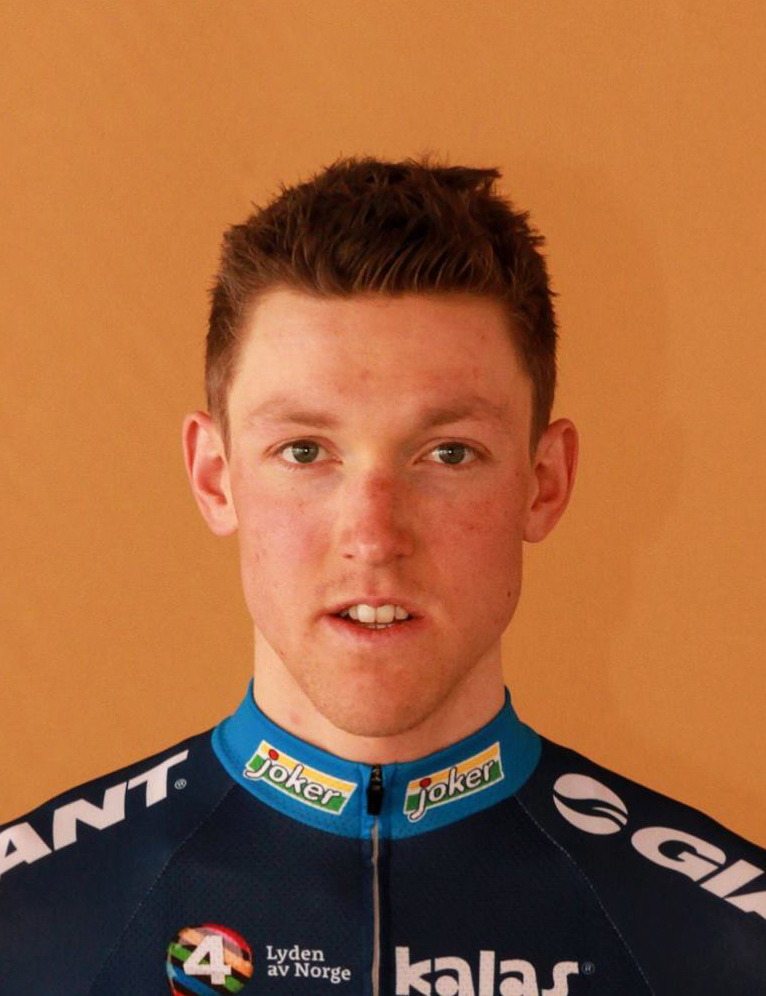
- Lunke in 2015.

Personal information
- Full name: Sindre Skjøstad Lunke
- Born: 17 April 1993 (age 33) Trondheim, Norway

Cycling career
- Sport: Cycling
- Current team: Retired
- Discipline: Road
- Role: Rider
- Rider type: Climber

Amateur team
- 2012: TVK Sykkel

Professional teams
- 2013–2014: Team Plussbank
- 2015: Team Joker
- 2016–2017: Team Giant–Alpecin
- 2018: Fortuneo–Samsic
- 2019–2020: Riwal Readynez

Sindre Skjøstad Lunke (born 17 April 1993) is a Norwegian former professional cyclist, who rode between 2013 and 2020 for five different teams. He was named in the startlist for the 2016 Vuelta a España and the start list for the 2017 Giro d'Italia.

Lunke retired at the end of the 2020 season, in order to study economics.

== Major results ==
2014
5th Overall Giro della Valle d'Aosta Mont Blanc
2015
7th Overall Tour de l'Avenir
8th Overall Giro della Valle d'Aosta Mont Blanc
2018
1st Mountains classification Arctic Race of Norway
2019
2nd Sundvolden GP
3rd Ringerike GP
6th Overall Arctic Race of Norway

=== Grand Tour general classification results timeline ===
Grand Tour	2016	2017
Giro d'Italia	—	120
Tour de France	—	—
Vuelta a España	135	—

Legend
—	Did not compete
DNF	Did not finish
