= 2014 GP Miguel Induráin =

Race details
- Dates: 5 April 2014
- Stages: 1
- Distance: 187 km (116.2 mi)
- Winning time: 4h 52' 01"

Results
	Winner	Alejandro Valverde (ESP)
	Second	Tom-Jelte Slagter (NED)
	Third	Sergey Chernetskiy (RUS)

The 2014 GP Miguel Induráin was the 61st edition of the GP Miguel Induráin cycle race and was held on 5 April 2014. The race started and finished in Estella. The race was won by Alejandro Valverde.

== General classification ==
Final general classification

Rank	Rider	Time
1	Alejandro Valverde (ESP)	4h 52' 01"
2	Tom-Jelte Slagter (NED)	+ 1' 02"
3	Sergey Chernetskiy (RUS)	+ 1' 02"
4	André Cardoso (POR)	+ 1' 06"
5	Yuri Trofimov (RUS)	+ 1' 08"
6	Ryder Hesjedal (CAN)	+ 1' 40"
7	Alexandr Kolobnev (RUS)	+ 2' 18"
8	Ben King (USA)	+ 2' 28"
9	David Arroyo (ESP)	+ 2' 39"
10	Miguel Mínguez (ESP)	+ 3' 11"
