= Omar Bertazzo =

Italian bicycle racer

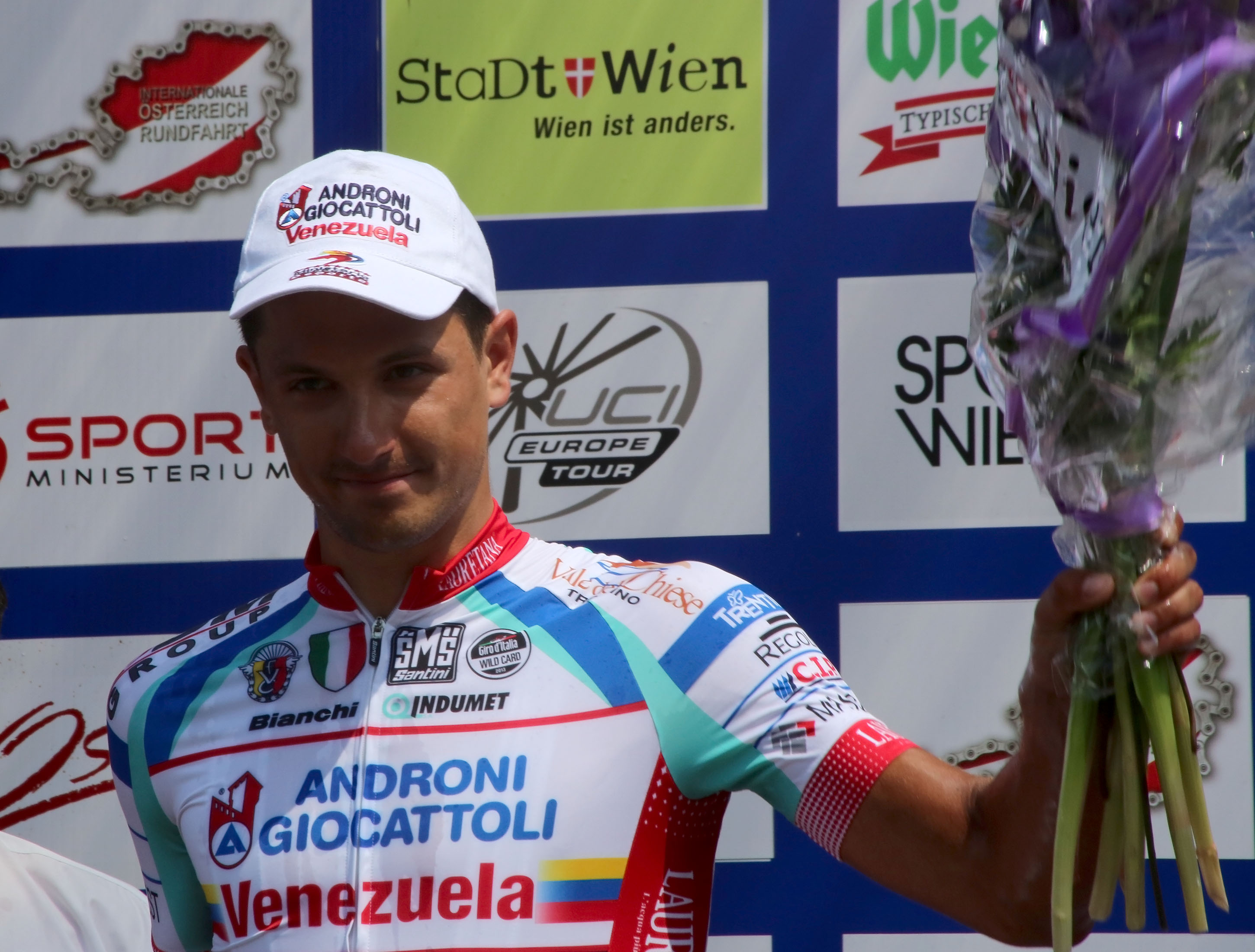
- Bertazzo at the 2013 Tour of Austria

Personal information
- Born: 7 January 1989 (age 37) Este, Italy

Cycling career
- Sport: Cycling
- Disciplines: Road; track
- Role: Rider
- Rider type: Sprinter

Amateur teams
- 2007: Team La Torre
- 2008–2009: Filmop Sorelle Ramonda Bottoli
- 2010: U.C. Trevigiani–Dynamon–Bottoli

Professional team
- 2011–2014: Androni Giocattoli

Omar Bertazzo (born 7 January 1989 in Este) is an Italian former professional cyclist.

== Major results ==
2009
Vuelta a Tenerife

1st Stages 2 & 5

2011
1st OCBC Cycle Singapore
2012
6th Grand Prix de Fourmies
7th Coppa Sabatini
2013
1st Stage 8 Tour of Austria
1st Points classification Vuelta a Venezuela
4th La Roue Tourangelle
4th Classic Loire Atlantique
5th Route Adélie
2014
9th Ronde van Limburg
10th Ronde van Zeeland Seaports
