= Blel Kadri =

Road bicycle racer

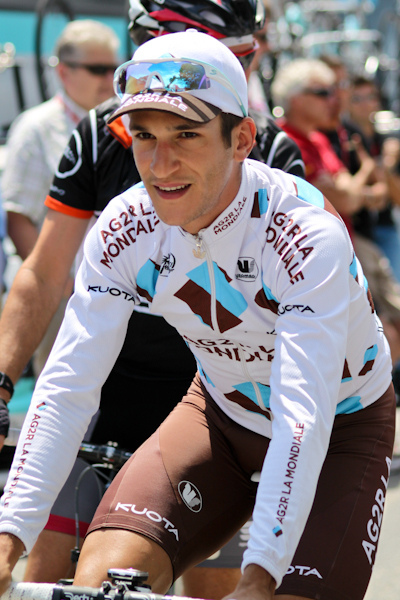
- Kadri at the 2011 Critérium du Dauphiné

Personal information
- Full name: Blel Kadri
- Born: 3 September 1986 (age 40) Bordeaux, Aquitaine, France
- Height: 1.76 m (5 ft 9 1/2 in)
- Weight: 90 kg (200 lb)

Cycling career
- Sport: Cycling
- Discipline: Road
- Role: Rider
- Rider type: All-rounder

Amateur teams
- 2000–2004: Villeneuve CC
- 2005–2006: GSC Blagnac
- 2007–2008: Albi VS
- 2008: Ag2r–La Mondiale (stagiaire)

Professional team
- 2009–2016: Ag2r–La Mondiale

Major wins
- Grand Tours Tour de France 1 individual stage (2014) One-day races and Classics Giro del Lazio/Roma Maxima (2013)

Blel Kadri (born 3 September 1986) is a former French professional road racing cyclist, who most recently rode for UCI ProTeam AG2R La Mondiale. He is of Algerian descent.

== Career ==
=== 2013 ===
In March 2013, Kadri won the Roma Maxima, a newly revived race formerly known as the Giro del Lazio. He was part of the early breakaway which formed after the first hour of racing, and shook off his fellow escapees until he was alone with 40 km (24.9 mi) to go. He managed to resist to the peloton's onslaught and triumphed in Rome.

=== 2014 ===
On 12 July 2014, he achieved his biggest success, winning his first stage victory in the Tour de France. Also, on this stage, he won the Most Combative Rider award for the second time during the Tour de France and held the King of the Mountains jersey.

== Post-cycling ==
After retiring from professional racing, he was working in the cycling aisle of a department store in Toulouse.

== Career achievements ==
=== Major results ===
2007
7th Overall Giro delle Regioni
2008
2nd Overall Ronde de l'Isard

1st Stage 2

7th Overall Tour du Haut-Anjou
2009
3rd Grand Prix de Plumelec-Morbihan
7th Trophée des Grimpeurs
2010
7th Overall Route du Sud

1st Stage 2

9th Overall Étoile de Bessèges
2011
2nd Overall Circuit de la Sarthe
4th Overall Bayern–Rundfahrt
8th Overall Tour Down Under
10th Overall Volta a Catalunya
2012
1st Mountains classification, Route du Sud
10th Les Boucles du Sud Ardèche
2013
1st Roma Maxima
Combativity award Stage 2 Tour de France
2014
Tour de France

1st Stage 8
Held after Stage 8
Combativity award Stages 2 & 8

=== Grand Tour general classification results timeline ===
Grand Tour	2010	2011	2012	2013	2014	2015	2016
Giro d'Italia	—	—	—	—	—	—	147
Tour de France	—	116	89	125	84	—	—
Vuelta a España	82	—	169	—	—	150	—

Legend
—	Did not compete
DNF	Did not finish
