= Maksim Molokoyedov =

Russian footballer

Personal information
- Full name: Maksim Alekseyevich Molokoyedov
- Date of birth: 24 December 1987 (age 38)
- Place of birth: Dedovichi, Pskov Oblast, Russian SFSR
- Height: 1.75 m (5 ft 9 in)
- Positions: Midfielder; forward

Youth career
- FC Zenit Saint Petersburg

Senior career*
Years	Team	Apps	(Gls)
2004	FC Sertolovo		
2004–2005	SDYuSHOR Zenit Saint Petersburg		
2006–2007	FC Dynamo Saint Petersburg	14	(0)
2008	FC Stroitel Saint Petersburg		
2009	FC Nevsky Front Saint Petersburg		
2009	FC Strela-Yedinaya Rossiya Pskov		
2009	FC Dedovichi		
2009	FC Pskov-747	12	(1)
2012–2013	Santiago Morning	7	(1)
2013–2014	FC Zvezda Saint Petersburg (amateur)		

International career
2004	Russia U17	8	(1)
- * Club domestic league appearances and goals

Maksim Alekseyevich Molokoyedov (Russian: Максим Алексеевич Молокоедов; born 24 December 1987) is a former Russian professional football player. He played as a midfielder.

== Criminal conviction ==
In 2010, Molokoyedov was convicted in Chile to three years of imprisonment for carrying six kilograms of cocaine. In 2012, he signed a professional contract with the second-level team Santiago Morning with one year still remaining on his sentence. He was let out to play and train on day leave. In February 2013 he finished his prison term and was allowed to stay in the country.
