= 2019 Vuelta a España, Stage 1 to Stage 11 =

First half of the 2019 Grand Tour

The 2019 Vuelta a España is the 74th edition of the Vuelta a España, one of cycling's Grand Tours. The Vuelta started in Torrevieja, with a team time trial on 24 August, and Stage 11 occurred on 4 September with a stage to Urdax. The race finished in Madrid on 15 September.

== Classification standings ==
Legend
	Denotes the leader of the general classification
	Denotes the leader of the points classification
	Denotes the leader of the mountains classification
	Denotes the leader of the young rider classification
A white jersey with a red number bib.	Denotes the leader of the team classification
A white jersey with a yellow number bib.	Denotes the winner of the combativity award

== Stage 1 ==
24 August 2019 — Salinas de Torrevieja to Torrevieja, 13.4 km (8.3 mi), team time trial (TTT)

Stage 1 result
Rank	Team	Time
1	Astana	14' 51"
2	Deceuninck–Quick-Step	+ 2"
3	Team Sunweb	+ 5"
4	EF Education First	+ 7"
5	Bora–Hansgrohe	+ 13"
6	CCC Team	+ 15"
7	Movistar Team	+ 16"
8	Groupama–FDJ	+ 16"
9	Mitchelton–Scott	+ 18"
10	Lotto–Soudal	+ 19"

General classification after stage 1
Rank	Rider	Team	Time
1	Miguel Ángel López (COL)	Astana	14' 51"
2	Dario Cataldo (ITA)	Astana	+ 0"
3	Jakob Fuglsang (DEN)	Astana	+ 0"
4	Ion Izagirre (ESP)	Astana	+ 0"
5	Luis León Sánchez (ESP)	Astana	+ 0"
6	Gorka Izagirre (ESP)	Astana	+ 0"
7	Philippe Gilbert (BEL)	Deceuninck–Quick-Step	+ 2"
8	Zdeněk Štybar (CZE)	Deceuninck–Quick-Step	+ 2"
9	Maximiliano Richeze (ARG)	Deceuninck–Quick-Step	+ 2"
10	James Knox (GBR)	Deceuninck–Quick-Step	+ 2"

== Stage 2 ==
25 August 2019 — Benidorm to Calpe, 199.6 km (124.0 mi)

Stage 2 result
Rank	Rider	Team	Time
1	Nairo Quintana (COL)	Movistar Team	5h 11' 17"
2	Nicolas Roche (IRL)	Team Sunweb	+ 5"
3	Primož Roglič (SLO)	Team Jumbo–Visma	+ 5"
4	Rigoberto Urán (COL)	EF Education First	+ 5"
5	Fabio Aru (ITA)	UAE Team Emirates	+ 5"
6	Mikel Nieve (ESP)	Mitchelton–Scott	+ 8"
7	Sergio Higuita (COL)	EF Education First	+ 37"
8	Tadej Pogačar (SLO)	UAE Team Emirates	+ 37"
9	Alex Aranburu (ESP)	Caja Rural–Seguros RGA	+ 37"
10	Alejandro Valverde (ESP)	Movistar Team	+ 37"

General classification after stage 2
Rank	Rider	Team	Time
1	Nicolas Roche (IRL)	Team Sunweb	5h 26' 12"
2	Nairo Quintana (COL)	Movistar Team	+ 2"
3	Rigoberto Urán (COL)	EF Education First	+ 8"
4	Mikel Nieve (ESP)	Mitchelton–Scott	+ 22"
5	Miguel Ángel López (COL)	Astana	+ 33"
6	Primož Roglič (SLO)	Team Jumbo–Visma	+ 36"
7	Wilco Kelderman (NED)	Team Sunweb	+ 38"
8	Sergio Higuita (COL)	EF Education First	+ 40"
9	Davide Formolo (ITA)	Bora–Hansgrohe	+ 46"
10	Rafał Majka (POL)	Bora–Hansgrohe	+ 46"

== Stage 3 ==
26 August 2019 — Ibi to Alicante, 188 km (116.8 mi)

Stage 3 result
Rank	Rider	Team	Time
1	Sam Bennett (IRL)	Bora–Hansgrohe	4h 25' 02"
2	Edward Theuns (BEL)	Trek–Segafredo	+ 0"
3	Luka Mezgec (SLO)	Mitchelton–Scott	+ 0"
4	Jon Aberasturi (ESP)	Caja Rural–Seguros RGA	+ 0"
5	Phil Bauhaus (GER)	Bahrain–Merida	+ 0"
6	Maximiliano Richeze (ARG)	Deceuninck–Quick-Step	+ 0"
7	Fabio Jakobsen (NED)	Deceuninck–Quick-Step	+ 0"
8	Cyril Barthe (FRA)	Euskadi–Murias	+ 0"
9	Szymon Sajnok (POL)	CCC Team	+ 0"
10	Clément Venturini (FRA)	AG2R La Mondiale	+ 0"

General classification after stage 3
Rank	Rider	Team	Time
1	Nicolas Roche (IRL)	Team Sunweb	9h 51' 14"
2	Nairo Quintana (COL)	Movistar Team	+ 2"
3	Rigoberto Urán (COL)	EF Education First	+ 8"
4	Mikel Nieve (ESP)	Mitchelton–Scott	+ 22"
5	Miguel Ángel López (COL)	Astana	+ 33"
6	Primož Roglič (SLO)	Team Jumbo–Visma	+ 35"
7	Sergio Higuita (COL)	EF Education First	+ 37"
8	Wilco Kelderman (NED)	Team Sunweb	+ 38"
9	Davide Formolo (ITA)	Bora–Hansgrohe	+ 46"
10	Rafał Majka (POL)	Bora–Hansgrohe	+ 46"

== Stage 4 ==
27 August 2019 — Cullera to El Puig, 175.5 km (109.1 mi)

Stage 4 result
Rank	Rider	Team	Time
1	Fabio Jakobsen (NED)	Deceuninck–Quick-Step	4h 04' 16"
2	Sam Bennett (IRL)	Bora–Hansgrohe	+ 0"
3	Fernando Gaviria (COL)	UAE Team Emirates	+ 0"
4	Luka Mezgec (SLO)	Mitchelton–Scott	+ 0"
5	Marc Sarreau (FRA)	Groupama–FDJ	+ 0"
6	Szymon Sajnok (POL)	CCC Team	+ 0"
7	Edvald Boasson Hagen (NOR)	Team Dimension Data	+ 0"
8	Jon Aberasturi (ESP)	Caja Rural–Seguros RGA	+ 0"
9	Clément Venturini (FRA)	AG2R La Mondiale	+ 0"
10	Maximiliano Richeze (ARG)	Deceuninck–Quick-Step	+ 0"

General classification after stage 4
Rank	Rider	Team	Time
1	Nicolas Roche (IRL)	Team Sunweb	13h 55' 30"
2	Nairo Quintana (COL)	Movistar Team	+ 2"
3	Rigoberto Urán (COL)	EF Education First	+ 8"
4	Mikel Nieve (ESP)	Mitchelton–Scott	+ 22"
5	Miguel Ángel López (COL)	Astana	+ 33"
6	Primož Roglič (SLO)	Team Jumbo–Visma	+ 35"
7	Sergio Higuita (COL)	EF Education First	+ 37"
8	Wilco Kelderman (NED)	Team Sunweb	+ 38"
9	Davide Formolo (ITA)	Bora–Hansgrohe	+ 46"
10	Rafał Majka (POL)	Bora–Hansgrohe	+ 46"

== Stage 5 ==
28 August 2019 — L'Eliana to Observatorio Astrofísico de Javalambre, 170.7 km (106.1 mi)

Stage 5 result
Rank	Rider	Team	Time
1	Ángel Madrazo (ESP)	Burgos BH	4h 58' 31"
2	Jetse Bol (NED)	Burgos BH	+ 10"
3	José Herrada (ESP)	Cofidis	+ 22"
4	Miguel Ángel López (COL)	Astana	+ 47"
5	Alejandro Valverde (ESP)	Movistar Team	+ 59"
6	Primož Roglič (SLO)	Team Jumbo–Visma	+ 59"
7	Tadej Pogačar (SLO)	UAE Team Emirates	+ 1' 29"
8	Nairo Quintana (COL)	Movistar Team	+ 1' 41"
9	Sepp Kuss (USA)	Team Jumbo–Visma	+ 1' 41"
10	Esteban Chaves (COL)	Mitchelton–Scott	+ 1' 46"

General classification after stage 5
Rank	Rider	Team	Time
1	Miguel Ángel López (COL)	Astana	18h 55' 21"
2	Primož Roglič (SLO)	Team Jumbo–Visma	+ 14"
3	Nairo Quintana (COL)	Movistar Team	+ 23"
4	Alejandro Valverde (ESP)	Movistar Team	+ 28"
5	Nicolas Roche (IRL)	Team Sunweb	+ 57"
6	Rigoberto Urán (COL)	EF Education First	+ 59"
7	Esteban Chaves (COL)	Mitchelton–Scott	+ 1' 17"
8	Rafał Majka (POL)	Bora–Hansgrohe	+ 1' 18"
9	Tadej Pogačar (SLO)	UAE Team Emirates	+ 1' 49"
10	Wilco Kelderman (NED)	Team Sunweb	+ 1' 50"

== Stage 6 ==
29 August 2019 — Mora de Rubielos to Ares del Maestrat, 198.9 km (123.6 mi)

Stage 6 result
Rank	Rider	Team	Time
1	Jesús Herrada (ESP)	Cofidis	4h 43' 55"
2	Dylan Teuns (BEL)	Bahrain–Merida	+ 7"
3	Dorian Godon (FRA)	AG2R La Mondiale	+ 21"
4	Robert Gesink (NED)	Team Jumbo–Visma	+ 21"
5	Bruno Armirail (FRA)	Groupama–FDJ	+ 37"
6	Paweł Poljański (POL)	Bora–Hansgrohe	+ 39"
7	Nelson Oliveira (POR)	Movistar Team	+ 45"
8	Gianluca Brambilla (ITA)	Trek–Segafredo	+ 47"
9	David de la Cruz (ESP)	Team Ineos	+ 50"
10	Tsgabu Grmay (ETH)	Mitchelton–Scott	+ 2' 35"

General classification after stage 6
Rank	Rider	Team	Time
1	Dylan Teuns (BEL)	Bahrain–Merida	23h 44' 00"
2	David de la Cruz (ESP)	Team Ineos	+ 38"
3	Miguel Ángel López (COL)	Astana	+ 1' 00"
4	Primož Roglič (SLO)	Team Jumbo–Visma	+ 1' 14"
5	Nairo Quintana (COL)	Movistar Team	+ 1' 23"
6	Robert Gesink (NED)	Team Jumbo–Visma	+ 1' 23"
7	Alejandro Valverde (ESP)	Movistar Team	+ 1' 28"
8	Esteban Chaves (COL)	Mitchelton–Scott	+ 2' 17"
9	Rafał Majka (POL)	Bora–Hansgrohe	+ 2' 18"
10	Tadej Pogačar (SLO)	UAE Team Emirates	+ 2' 47"

== Stage 7 ==
30 August 2019 — Onda to Mas de la Costa, 183.2 km (113.8 mi)

Stage 7 result
Rank	Rider	Team	Time
1	Alejandro Valverde (ESP)	Movistar Team	4h 34' 11"
2	Primož Roglič (SLO)	Team Jumbo–Visma	+ 0"
3	Miguel Ángel López (COL)	Astana	+ 6"
4	Nairo Quintana (COL)	Movistar Team	+ 6"
5	Rafał Majka (POL)	Bora–Hansgrohe	+ 42"
6	Ion Izagirre (ESP)	Astana	+ 48"
7	Tadej Pogačar (SLO)	UAE Team Emirates	+ 51"
8	Fabio Aru (ITA)	UAE Team Emirates	+ 51"
9	George Bennett (NZL)	Team Jumbo–Visma	+ 1' 07"
10	Óscar Rodríguez (ESP)	Euskadi–Murias	+ 1' 20"

General classification after stage 7
Rank	Rider	Team	Time
1	Miguel Ángel López (COL)	Astana	28h 19' 13"
2	Primož Roglič (SLO)	Team Jumbo–Visma	+ 6"
3	Alejandro Valverde (ESP)	Movistar Team	+ 16"
4	Nairo Quintana (COL)	Movistar Team	+ 27"
5	Rafał Majka (POL)	Bora–Hansgrohe	+ 1' 58"
6	Tadej Pogačar (SLO)	UAE Team Emirates	+ 2' 36"
7	Esteban Chaves (COL)	Mitchelton–Scott	+ 2' 52"
8	George Bennett (NZL)	Team Jumbo–Visma	+ 3' 34"
9	Wilco Kelderman (NED)	Team Sunweb	+ 3' 36"
10	Fabio Aru (ITA)	UAE Team Emirates	+ 3' 36"

== Stage 8 ==
31 August 2019 — Valls to Igualada, 166.9 km (103.7 mi)

Stage 8 result
Rank	Rider	Team	Time
1	Nikias Arndt (GER)	Team Sunweb	4h 34' 11"
2	Alex Aranburu (ESP)	Caja Rural–Seguros RGA	+ 0"
3	Tosh Van der Sande (BEL)	Lotto–Soudal	+ 0"
4	Ruben Guerreiro (POR)	Team Katusha–Alpecin	+ 0"
5	Jonas Koch (GER)	CCC Team	+ 0"
6	Dylan Teuns (BEL)	Bahrain–Merida	+ 0"
7	Jonathan Lastra (ESP)	Caja Rural–Seguros RGA	+ 0"
8	Tobias Ludvigsson (SWE)	Groupama–FDJ	+ 0"
9	Fernando Barceló (ESP)	Euskadi–Murias	+ 0"
10	Sergio Henao (COL)	UAE Team Emirates	+ 0"

General classification after stage 8
Rank	Rider	Team	Time
1	Nicolas Edet (FRA)	Cofidis	32h 16' 24"
2	Dylan Teuns (BEL)	Bahrain–Merida	+ 2' 21"
3	Miguel Ángel López (COL)	Astana	+ 3' 01"
4	Primož Roglič (SLO)	Team Jumbo–Visma	+ 3' 07"
5	Alejandro Valverde (ESP)	Movistar Team	+ 3' 17"
6	Nairo Quintana (COL)	Movistar Team	+ 3' 28"
7	Carl Fredrik Hagen (NOR)	Lotto–Soudal	+ 3' 45"
8	Rafał Majka (POL)	Bora–Hansgrohe	+ 4' 59"
9	Tadej Pogačar (SLO)	UAE Team Emirates	+ 5' 37"
10	Esteban Chaves (COL)	Mitchelton–Scott	+ 5' 53"

== Stage 9 ==
1 September 2019 — Andorra la Vella (Andorra) to Encamp (Andorra), 94.4 km (58.7 mi)

Stage 9 result
Rank	Rider	Team	Time
1	Tadej Pogačar (SLO)	UAE Team Emirates	2h 58' 09"
2	Nairo Quintana (COL)	Movistar Team	+ 23"
3	Primož Roglič (SLO)	Team Jumbo–Visma	+ 48"
4	Alejandro Valverde (ESP)	Movistar Team	+ 48"
5	Marc Soler (ESP)	Movistar Team	+ 57"
6	Hermann Pernsteiner (AUT)	Bahrain–Merida	+ 59"
7	Sergio Higuita (COL)	EF Education First	+ 1' 01"
8	Wilco Kelderman (NED)	Team Sunweb	+ 1' 01"
9	Miguel Ángel López (COL)	Astana	+ 1' 01"
10	Tao Geoghegan Hart (GBR)	Team Ineos	+ 1' 38"

General classification after stage 9
Rank	Rider	Team	Time
1	Nairo Quintana (COL)	Movistar Team	35h 18' 18"
2	Primož Roglič (SLO)	Team Jumbo–Visma	+ 6"
3	Miguel Ángel López (COL)	Astana	+ 17"
4	Alejandro Valverde (ESP)	Movistar Team	+ 20"
5	Tadej Pogačar (SLO)	UAE Team Emirates	+ 1' 42"
6	Carl Fredrik Hagen (NOR)	Lotto–Soudal	+ 1' 46"
7	Nicolas Edet (FRA)	Cofidis	+ 2' 21"
8	Rafał Majka (POL)	Bora–Hansgrohe	+ 3' 22"
9	Wilco Kelderman (NED)	Team Sunweb	+ 3' 53"
10	Dylan Teuns (BEL)	Bahrain–Merida	+ 4' 46"

== Rest day 1 ==
2 September 2019 — Andorra

== Stage 10 ==
3 September 2019 — Jurançon (France) to Pau (France), 36.2 km (22.5 mi) (ITT)

Stage 10 result
Rank	Rider	Team	Time
1	Primož Roglič (SLO)	Team Jumbo–Visma	47' 05"
2	Patrick Bevin (NZL)	CCC Team	+ 25"
3	Rémi Cavagna (FRA)	Deceuninck–Quick-Step	+ 27"
4	Lawson Craddock (USA)	EF Education First	+ 48"
5	Nelson Oliveira (POR)	Movistar Team	+ 1' 02"
6	Pierre Latour (FRA)	AG2R La Mondiale	+ 1' 14"
7	Thomas De Gendt (BEL)	Lotto–Soudal	+ 1' 21"
8	Marc Soler (ESP)	Movistar Team	+ 1' 22"
9	Dylan Teuns (BEL)	Bahrain–Merida	+ 1' 27"
10	Daniel Martínez (COL)	EF Education First	+ 1' 28"

General classification after stage 10
Rank	Rider	Team	Time
1	Primož Roglič (SLO)	Team Jumbo–Visma	36h 05' 29"
2	Alejandro Valverde (ESP)	Movistar Team	+ 1' 52"
3	Miguel Ángel López (COL)	Astana	+ 2' 11"
4	Nairo Quintana (COL)	Movistar Team	+ 3' 00"
5	Tadej Pogačar (SLO)	UAE Team Emirates	+ 3' 05"
6	Carl Fredrik Hagen (NOR)	Lotto–Soudal	+ 4' 59"
7	Rafał Majka (POL)	Bora–Hansgrohe	+ 5' 42"
8	Nicolas Edet (FRA)	Cofidis	+ 5' 49"
9	Dylan Teuns (BEL)	Bahrain–Merida	+ 6' 07"
10	Wilco Kelderman (NED)	Team Sunweb	+ 6' 25"

== Stage 11 ==
4 September 2019 — Saint-Palais (France) to Urdax, 180 km (111.8 mi)

Stage 11 result
Rank	Rider	Team	Time
1	Mikel Iturria (ESP)	Euskadi–Murias	4h 36' 44"
2	Jonathan Lastra (ESP)	Caja Rural–Seguros RGA	+ 6"
3	Lawson Craddock (USA)	EF Education First	+ 6"
4	Damien Howson (AUS)	Mitchelton–Scott	+ 6"
5	François Bidard (FRA)	AG2R La Mondiale	+ 6"
6	Amanuel Ghebreigzabhier (ERI)	Team Dimension Data	+ 9"
7	Benjamin Thomas (FRA)	Groupama–FDJ	+ 12"
8	Matteo Fabbro (ITA)	Team Katusha–Alpecin	+ 12"
9	Gorka Izagirre (ESP)	Astana	+ 12"
10	Rémi Cavagna (FRA)	Deceuninck–Quick-Step	+ 12"

General classification after stage 11
Rank	Rider	Team	Time
1	Primož Roglič (SLO)	Team Jumbo–Visma	41h 00' 48"
2	Alejandro Valverde (ESP)	Movistar Team	+ 1' 52"
3	Miguel Ángel López (COL)	Astana	+ 2' 11"
4	Nairo Quintana (COL)	Movistar Team	+ 3' 00"
5	Tadej Pogačar (SLO)	UAE Team Emirates	+ 3' 05"
6	Carl Fredrik Hagen (NOR)	Lotto–Soudal	+ 4' 59"
7	Rafał Majka (POL)	Bora–Hansgrohe	+ 5' 42"
8	Nicolas Edet (FRA)	Cofidis	+ 5' 49"
9	Dylan Teuns (BEL)	Bahrain–Merida	+ 6' 07"
10	Wilco Kelderman (NED)	Team Sunweb	+ 6' 25"
