= 2019 Vuelta a España, Stage 12 to Stage 21 =

Second half of the 2019 Grand Tour

The 2019 Vuelta a España is the 74th edition of the Vuelta a España, one of cycling's Grand Tours. The Vuelta started in Torrevieja, with a team time trial on 24 August, and Stage 12 occurred on 5 September with a hilly stage from Circuito de Navarra. The race finished in Madrid on 15 September.

== Classification standings ==
Legend
	Denotes the leader of the general classification
	Denotes the leader of the points classification
	Denotes the leader of the mountains classification
	Denotes the leader of the young rider classification
A white jersey with a green number bib.	Denotes the winner of the combativity award

== Stage 12 ==
5 September 2019 — Circuito de Navarra to Bilbao, 171.4 km (106.5 mi)

Stage 12 result
Rank	Rider	Team	Time
1	Philippe Gilbert (BEL)	Deceuninck–Quick-Step	3h 48' 18"
2	Alex Aranburu (ESP)	Caja Rural–Seguros RGA	+ 3"
3	Fernando Barceló (ESP)	Euskadi–Murias	+ 3"
4	José Joaquín Rojas (ESP)	Movistar Team	+ 22"
5	Nikias Arndt (GER)	Team Sunweb	+ 26"
6	Tosh Van der Sande (BEL)	Lotto–Soudal	+ 29"
7	Cyril Barthe (FRA)	Euskadi–Murias	+ 29"
8	Manuele Boaro (ITA)	Astana	+ 29"
9	Tim Declercq (BEL)	Deceuninck–Quick-Step	+ 29"
10	Valerio Conti (ITA)	UAE Team Emirates	+ 31"

General classification after stage 12
Rank	Rider	Team	Time
1	Primož Roglič (SLO)	Team Jumbo–Visma	44h 52' 08"
2	Alejandro Valverde (ESP)	Movistar Team	+ 1' 52"
3	Miguel Ángel López (COL)	Astana	+ 2' 11"
4	Nairo Quintana (COL)	Movistar Team	+ 3' 00"
5	Tadej Pogačar (SLO)	UAE Team Emirates	+ 3' 05"
6	Carl Fredrik Hagen (NOR)	Lotto–Soudal	+ 4' 59"
7	Rafał Majka (POL)	Bora–Hansgrohe	+ 5' 42"
8	Nicolas Edet (FRA)	Cofidis	+ 5' 49"
9	Dylan Teuns (BEL)	Bahrain–Merida	+ 6' 07"
10	Wilco Kelderman (NED)	Team Sunweb	+ 6' 25"

== Stage 13 ==
6 September 2019 — Bilbao to Los Machucos, 166.4 km (103.4 mi)

Stage 13 result
Rank	Rider	Team	Time
1	Tadej Pogačar (SLO)	UAE Team Emirates	4h 28' 26"
2	Primož Roglič (SLO)	Team Jumbo–Visma	+ 0"
3	Pierre Latour (FRA)	AG2R La Mondiale	+ 27"
4	Alejandro Valverde (ESP)	Movistar Team	+ 27"
5	Nairo Quintana (COL)	Movistar Team	+ 27"
6	Rafał Majka (POL)	Bora–Hansgrohe	+ 27"
7	Miguel Ángel López (COL)	Astana	+ 1' 01"
8	Gianluca Brambilla (ITA)	Trek–Segafredo	+ 1' 08"
9	Marc Soler (ESP)	Movistar Team	+ 1' 08"
10	Wilco Kelderman (NED)	Team Sunweb	+ 1' 08"

General classification after stage 13
Rank	Rider	Team	Time
1	Primož Roglič (SLO)	Team Jumbo–Visma	49h 20' 28"
2	Alejandro Valverde (ESP)	Movistar Team	+ 2' 25"
3	Tadej Pogačar (SLO)	UAE Team Emirates	+ 3' 01"
4	Miguel Ángel López (COL)	Astana	+ 3' 18"
5	Nairo Quintana (COL)	Movistar Team	+ 3' 33"
6	Rafał Majka (POL)	Bora–Hansgrohe	+ 6' 15"
7	Nicolas Edet (FRA)	Cofidis	+ 7' 18"
8	Carl Fredrik Hagen (NOR)	Lotto–Soudal	+ 7' 33"
9	Wilco Kelderman (NED)	Team Sunweb	+ 7' 39"
10	Dylan Teuns (BEL)	Bahrain–Merida	+ 9' 58"

== Stage 14 ==
7 September 2019 — San Vicente de la Barquera to Oviedo, 188 km (116.8 mi)

Stage 14 result
Rank	Rider	Team	Time
1	Sam Bennett (IRL)	Bora–Hansgrohe	4h 28' 46"
2	Maximiliano Richeze (ARG)	Deceuninck–Quick-Step	+ 0"
3	Tosh Van der Sande (BEL)	Lotto–Soudal	+ 0"
4	Marc Sarreau (FRA)	Groupama–FDJ	+ 0"
5	Clément Venturini (FRA)	AG2R La Mondiale	+ 0"
6	Marc Soler (ESP)	Movistar Team	+ 0"
7	Jonas Koch (GER)	CCC Team	+ 0"
8	John Degenkolb (GER)	Trek–Segafredo	+ 0"
9	Max Walscheid (GER)	Team Sunweb	+ 0"
10	Szymon Sajnok (POL)	CCC Team	+ 0"

General classification after stage 14
Rank	Rider	Team	Time
1	Primož Roglič (SLO)	Team Jumbo–Visma	53h 49' 14"
2	Alejandro Valverde (ESP)	Movistar Team	+ 2' 25"
3	Tadej Pogačar (SLO)	UAE Team Emirates	+ 3' 01"
4	Miguel Ángel López (COL)	Astana	+ 3' 18"
5	Nairo Quintana (COL)	Movistar Team	+ 3' 33"
6	Rafał Majka (POL)	Bora–Hansgrohe	+ 6' 15"
7	Nicolas Edet (FRA)	Cofidis	+ 7' 18"
8	Carl Fredrik Hagen (NOR)	Lotto–Soudal	+ 7' 33"
9	Wilco Kelderman (NED)	Team Sunweb	+ 7' 39"
10	Dylan Teuns (BEL)	Bahrain–Merida	+ 9' 58"

== Stage 15 ==
8 September 2019 — Tineo to Santuario del Acebo, 154.4 km (95.9 mi)

Stage 15 result
Rank	Rider	Team	Time
1	Sepp Kuss (USA)	Team Jumbo–Visma	4h 19' 04"
2	Ruben Guerreiro (POR)	Team Katusha–Alpecin	+ 39"
3	Tao Geoghegan Hart (GBR)	Team Ineos	+ 40"
4	Óscar Rodríguez (ESP)	Euskadi–Murias	+ 53"
5	Mark Padun (UKR)	Bahrain–Merida	+ 1' 49"
6	Ben O'Connor (AUS)	Team Dimension Data	+ 2' 05"
7	Lawson Craddock (USA)	EF Education First	+ 2' 11"
8	Primož Roglič (SLO)	Team Jumbo–Visma	+ 2' 14"
9	Alejandro Valverde (ESP)	Movistar Team	+ 2' 14"
10	Sander Armée (BEL)	Lotto–Soudal	+ 2' 48"

General classification after stage 15
Rank	Rider	Team	Time
1	Primož Roglič (SLO)	Team Jumbo–Visma	58h 10' 32"
2	Alejandro Valverde (ESP)	Movistar Team	+ 2' 25"
3	Tadej Pogačar (SLO)	UAE Team Emirates	+ 3' 42"
4	Miguel Ángel López (COL)	Astana	+ 3' 59"
5	Nairo Quintana (COL)	Movistar Team	+ 5' 09"
6	Rafał Majka (POL)	Bora–Hansgrohe	+ 7' 14"
7	Nicolas Edet (FRA)	Cofidis	+ 9' 08"
8	Wilco Kelderman (NED)	Team Sunweb	+ 9' 15"
9	Carl Fredrik Hagen (NOR)	Lotto–Soudal	+ 9' 44"
10	Hermann Pernsteiner (AUT)	Bahrain–Merida	+ 11' 39"

== Stage 16 ==
9 September 2019 — Pravia to La Cubilla, 144.4 km (89.7 mi)

Stage 16 result
Rank	Rider	Team	Time
1	Jakob Fuglsang (DEN)	Astana	4h 01' 22"
2	Tao Geoghegan Hart (GBR)	Team Ineos	+ 22"
3	Luis León Sánchez (ESP)	Astana	+ 40"
4	James Knox (GBR)	Deceuninck–Quick-Step	+ 42"
5	Gianluca Brambilla (ITA)	Trek–Segafredo	+ 1' 12"
6	Thomas De Gendt (BEL)	Lotto–Soudal	+ 2' 09"
7	Mikel Bizkarra (ESP)	Euskadi–Murias	+ 2' 15"
8	Amanuel Ghebreigzabhier (ERI)	Team Dimension Data	+ 2' 21"
9	Philippe Gilbert (BEL)	Deceuninck–Quick-Step	+ 2' 32"
10	Geoffrey Bouchard (FRA)	AG2R La Mondiale	+ 2' 32"

General classification after stage 16
Rank	Rider	Team	Time
1	Primož Roglič (SLO)	Team Jumbo–Visma	62h 17' 52"
2	Alejandro Valverde (ESP)	Movistar Team	+ 2' 48"
3	Tadej Pogačar (SLO)	UAE Team Emirates	+ 3' 42"
4	Miguel Ángel López (COL)	Astana	+ 3' 59"
5	Rafał Majka (POL)	Bora–Hansgrohe	+ 7' 40"
6	Nairo Quintana (COL)	Movistar Team	+ 7' 43"
7	Nicolas Edet (FRA)	Cofidis	+ 10' 27"
8	Wilco Kelderman (NED)	Team Sunweb	+ 10' 34"
9	Carl Fredrik Hagen (NOR)	Lotto–Soudal	+ 10' 40"
10	Hermann Pernsteiner (AUT)	Bahrain–Merida	+ 12' 05"

== Rest day 2 ==
10 September 2019 — León

== Stage 17 ==
11 September 2019 — Aranda de Duero to Guadalajara, 219.6 km (136.5 mi)

This race was the first time a road race of over 200km had attained an average speed in excess of 50 km/h, and earned Gilbert the Ruban Jaune.

Stage 17 result
Rank	Rider	Team	Time
1	Philippe Gilbert (BEL)	Deceuninck–Quick-Step	4h 20' 15"
2	Sam Bennett (IRL)	Bora–Hansgrohe	+ 2"
3	Rémi Cavagna (FRA)	Deceuninck–Quick-Step	+ 2"
4	Dylan Teuns (BEL)	Bahrain–Merida	+ 2"
5	Wilco Kelderman (NED)	Team Sunweb	+ 2"
6	Jonas Koch (GER)	CCC Team	+ 2"
7	Lawson Craddock (USA)	EF Education First	+ 2"
8	Tim Declercq (BEL)	Deceuninck–Quick-Step	+ 2"
9	Silvan Dillier (SUI)	AG2R La Mondiale	+ 2"
10	James Knox (GBR)	Deceuninck–Quick-Step	+ 6"

General classification after stage 17
Rank	Rider	Team	Time
1	Primož Roglič (SLO)	Team Jumbo–Visma	66h 43' 36"
2	Nairo Quintana (COL)	Movistar Team	+ 2' 24"
3	Alejandro Valverde (ESP)	Movistar Team	+ 2' 48"
4	Tadej Pogačar (SLO)	UAE Team Emirates	+ 3' 42"
5	Miguel Ángel López (COL)	Astana	+ 4' 09"
6	Wilco Kelderman (NED)	Team Sunweb	+ 5' 05"
7	Rafał Majka (POL)	Bora–Hansgrohe	+ 7' 40"
8	James Knox (GBR)	Deceuninck–Quick-Step	+ 8' 03"
9	Carl Fredrik Hagen (NOR)	Lotto–Soudal	+ 10' 43"
10	Dylan Teuns (BEL)	Bahrain–Merida	+ 12' 21"

== Stage 18 ==
12 September 2019 — Colmenar Viejo to Becerril de la Sierra, 177.5 km (110.3 mi)

Stage 18 result
Rank	Rider	Team	Time
1	Sergio Higuita (COL)	EF Education First	4h 33' 09"
2	Primož Roglič (SLO)	Team Jumbo–Visma	+ 15"
3	Alejandro Valverde (ESP)	Movistar Team	+ 15"
4	Rafał Majka (POL)	Bora–Hansgrohe	+ 15"
5	Miguel Ángel López (COL)	Astana	+ 17"
6	Carl Fredrik Hagen (NOR)	Lotto–Soudal	+ 1' 16"
7	Louis Meintjes (RSA)	Team Dimension Data	+ 1' 16"
8	Nairo Quintana (COL)	Movistar Team	+ 1' 16"
9	Tadej Pogačar (SLO)	UAE Team Emirates	+ 1' 16"
10	Óscar Rodríguez (ESP)	Euskadi–Murias	+ 3' 47"

General classification after stage 18
Rank	Rider	Team	Time
1	Primož Roglič (SLO)	Team Jumbo–Visma	71h 16' 54"
2	Alejandro Valverde (ESP)	Movistar Team	+ 2' 50"
3	Nairo Quintana (COL)	Movistar Team	+ 3' 31"
4	Miguel Ángel López (COL)	Astana	+ 4' 17"
5	Tadej Pogačar (SLO)	UAE Team Emirates	+ 4' 49"
6	Rafał Majka (POL)	Bora–Hansgrohe	+ 7' 46"
7	Wilco Kelderman (NED)	Team Sunweb	+ 9' 46"
8	Carl Fredrik Hagen (NOR)	Lotto–Soudal	+ 11' 50"
9	James Knox (GBR)	Deceuninck–Quick-Step	+ 12' 44"
10	Marc Soler (ESP)	Movistar Team	+ 21' 09"

== Stage 19 ==
13 September 2019 — Ávila to Toledo, 165.2 km (102.7 mi)

Stage 19 result
Rank	Rider	Team	Time
1	Rémi Cavagna (FRA)	Deceuninck–Quick-Step	3h 43' 34"
2	Sam Bennett (IRL)	Bora–Hansgrohe	+ 5"
3	Zdeněk Štybar (CZE)	Deceuninck–Quick-Step	+ 5"
4	Philippe Gilbert (BEL)	Deceuninck–Quick-Step	+ 5"
5	Alejandro Valverde (ESP)	Movistar Team	+ 5"
6	Tosh Van der Sande (BEL)	Lotto–Soudal	+ 5"
7	Dylan Teuns (BEL)	Bahrain–Merida	+ 5"
8	Tadej Pogačar (SLO)	UAE Team Emirates	+ 5"
9	Miguel Ángel López (COL)	Astana	+ 5"
10	Primož Roglič (SLO)	Team Jumbo–Visma	+ 5"

General classification after stage 19
Rank	Rider	Team	Time
1	Primož Roglič (SLO)	Team Jumbo–Visma	75h 00' 33"
2	Alejandro Valverde (ESP)	Movistar Team	+ 2' 50"
3	Nairo Quintana (COL)	Movistar Team	+ 3' 31"
4	Miguel Ángel López (COL)	Astana	+ 4' 17"
5	Tadej Pogačar (SLO)	UAE Team Emirates	+ 4' 49"
6	Rafał Majka (POL)	Bora–Hansgrohe	+ 7' 46"
7	Wilco Kelderman (NED)	Team Sunweb	+ 9' 46"
8	Carl Fredrik Hagen (NOR)	Lotto–Soudal	+ 11' 50"
9	James Knox (GBR)	Deceuninck–Quick-Step	+ 13' 23"
10	Marc Soler (ESP)	Movistar Team	+ 21' 09"

== Stage 20 ==
14 September 2019 — Arenas de San Pedro to Plataforma de Gredos, 190.4 km (118.3 mi)

Stage 20 result
Rank	Rider	Team	Time
1	Tadej Pogačar (SLO)	UAE Team Emirates	5h 16' 40"
2	Alejandro Valverde (ESP)	Movistar Team	+ 1' 32"
3	Rafał Majka (POL)	Bora–Hansgrohe	+ 1' 32"
4	Hermann Pernsteiner (AUT)	Bahrain–Merida	+ 1' 32"
5	Primož Roglič (SLO)	Team Jumbo–Visma	+ 1' 41"
6	Sergio Higuita (COL)	EF Education First	+ 1' 49"
7	Dylan Teuns (BEL)	Bahrain–Merida	+ 1' 49"
8	Nairo Quintana (COL)	Movistar Team	+ 1' 56"
9	Mikel Nieve (ESP)	Mitchelton–Scott	+ 1' 59"
10	Wilco Kelderman (NED)	Team Sunweb	+ 1' 59"

General classification after stage 20
Rank	Rider	Team	Time
1	Primož Roglič (SLO)	Team Jumbo–Visma	80h 18' 54"
2	Alejandro Valverde (ESP)	Movistar Team	+ 2' 33"
3	Tadej Pogačar (SLO)	UAE Team Emirates	+ 2' 55"
4	Nairo Quintana (COL)	Movistar Team	+ 3' 46"
5	Miguel Ángel López (COL)	Astana	+ 4' 48"
6	Rafał Majka (POL)	Bora–Hansgrohe	+ 7' 33"
7	Wilco Kelderman (NED)	Team Sunweb	+ 10' 04"
8	Carl Fredrik Hagen (NOR)	Lotto–Soudal	+ 12' 54"
9	Marc Soler (ESP)	Movistar Team	+ 22' 27"
10	Mikel Nieve (ESP)	Mitchelton–Scott	+ 22' 34"

== Stage 21 ==
15 September 2019 — Fuenlabrada to Madrid, 106.6 km (66.2 mi)

Stage 21 result
Rank	Rider	Team	Time
1	Fabio Jakobsen (NED)	Deceuninck–Quick-Step	2h 48' 20"
2	Sam Bennett (IRL)	Bora–Hansgrohe	+ 0"
3	Szymon Sajnok (POL)	CCC Team	+ 0"
4	Jon Aberasturi (ESP)	Caja Rural–Seguros RGA	+ 0"
5	Edvald Boasson Hagen (NOR)	Team Dimension Data	+ 0"
6	Edward Theuns (BEL)	Trek–Segafredo	+ 0"
7	Tosh Van der Sande (BEL)	Lotto–Soudal	+ 0"
8	Clément Venturini (FRA)	AG2R La Mondiale	+ 0"
9	Marc Sarreau (FRA)	Groupama–FDJ	+ 0"
10	Dion Smith (NZL)	Mitchelton–Scott	+ 0"

Final general classification
Rank	Rider	Team	Time
1	Primož Roglič (SLO)	Team Jumbo–Visma	83h 07' 14"
2	Alejandro Valverde (ESP)	Movistar Team	+ 2' 33"
3	Tadej Pogačar (SLO)	UAE Team Emirates	+ 2' 55"
4	Nairo Quintana (COL)	Movistar Team	+ 3' 46"
5	Miguel Ángel López (COL)	Astana	+ 4' 48"
6	Rafał Majka (POL)	Bora–Hansgrohe	+ 7' 33"
7	Wilco Kelderman (NED)	Team Sunweb	+ 10' 04"
8	Carl Fredrik Hagen (NOR)	Lotto–Soudal	+ 12' 54"
9	Marc Soler (ESP)	Movistar Team	+ 22' 27"
10	Mikel Nieve (ESP)	Mitchelton–Scott	+ 22' 34"
