= 2020 Ardèche Classic =

2020 Faun-Ardèche Classic
2020 UCI Europe Tour 2020 UCI ProSeries

Race details
- Dates: 29 February 2020
- Stages: 1
- Distance: 184.4 km (114.6 mi)
- Winning time: 5h 13' 10"

Results
	Winner	Rémi Cavagna (FRA)	(Deceuninck–Quick-Step)
	Second	Tanel Kangert (EST)	(EF Pro Cycling)
	Third	Guillaume Martin (FRA)	(Cofidis)

The 2020 Faun-Ardèche Classic was the 20th edition of the Classic Sud-Ardèche cycle race. It was held on 29 February 2020 as a category 1.Pro race on the 2020 UCI Europe Tour and UCI ProSeries. The race started and finished in Guilherand-Granges. The race was won by Rémi Cavagna of Deceuninck–Quick-Step.

== Teams ==
Twenty teams of up to seven riders started the race:

UCI WorldTeams

- AG2R La Mondiale
- Deceuninck–Quick-Step
- Trek–Segafredo
- EF Pro Cycling
- Groupama–FDJ
- Cofidis
- NTT Pro Cycling

UCI Professional Continental teams

- Burgos BH
- Caja Rural–Seguros RGA
- Nippo–Delko–One Provence
- Total Direct Énergie
- B&B Hotels–Vital Concept
- Bingoal–Wallonie Bruxelles
- Arkéa–Samsic
- Rally Cycling
- Circus–Wanty Gobert
- Fundación–Orbea
- Vini Zabù–KTM
- Riwal Readynez

UCI Continental teams

- St. Michel–Auber93

== Result ==
Result
Rank	Rider	Team	Time
1	Rémi Cavagna (FRA)	Deceuninck–Quick-Step	5h 13' 10"
2	Tanel Kangert (EST)	EF Pro Cycling	+ 2' 51"
3	Guillaume Martin (FRA)	Cofidis	+ 2' 55"
4	Warren Barguil (FRA)	Arkéa–Samsic	+ 3' 24"
5	Nicolas Edet (FRA)	Cofidis	+ 4' 35"
6	Lorenzo Rota (ITA)	Vini Zabù–KTM	+ 5' 07"
7	Mikkel Frølich Honoré (DEN)	Deceuninck–Quick-Step	+ 5' 22"
8	Ben King (USA)	NTT Pro Cycling	+ 5' 36"
9	Nans Peters (FRA)	AG2R La Mondiale	+ 5' 38"
10	Andrea Bagioli (ITA)	Deceuninck–Quick-Step	+ 5' 43"
