= 2019 Vuelta a España =

74th edition of the Vuelta a España

2019 UCI World Tour, race 32 of 38
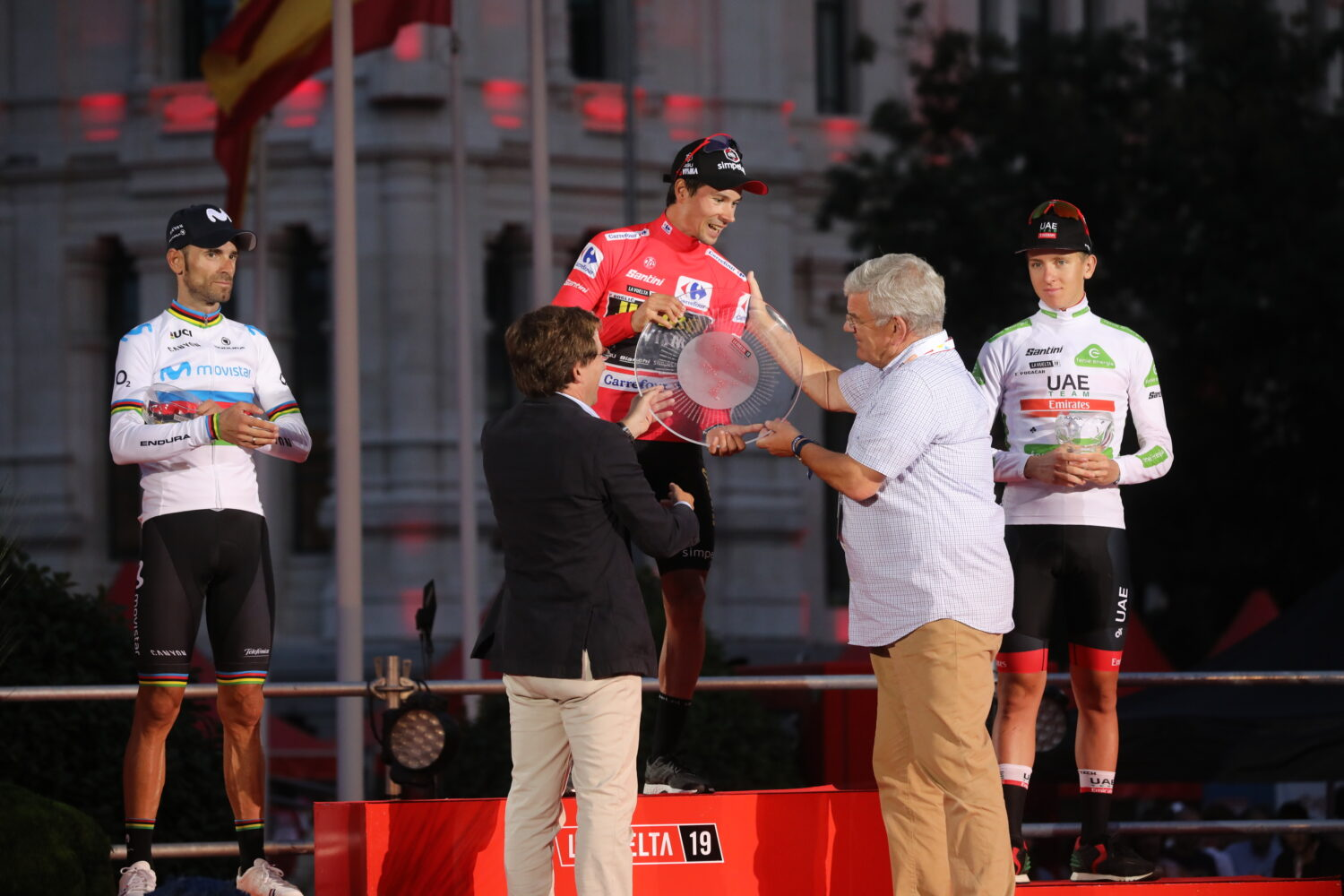
- Podium in Madrid on 15 September 2019

Race details
- Dates: 24 August – 15 September
- Stages: 21
- Distance: 3,290.7 km (2,045 mi)
- Winning time: 83h 07' 14"

Results
Jersey awarded to the overall winner	Winner	Primož Roglič (SLO)	(Team Jumbo–Visma)
	Second	Alejandro Valverde (ESP)	(Movistar Team)
	Third	Tadej Pogačar (SLO)	(UAE Team Emirates)
Jersey awarded to the points classification winner	Points	Primož Roglič (SLO)	(Team Jumbo–Visma)
Jersey awarded to the mountains classification winner	Mountains	Geoffrey Bouchard (FRA)	(AG2R La Mondiale)
Jersey awarded to the youth classification winner	Youth	Tadej Pogačar (SLO)	(UAE Team Emirates)
Jersey awarded to the combativity classification winner	Combativity	Miguel Ángel López (COL)	(Astana)
Jersey awarded to the team classification winner	Team	(Spain) Movistar Team	

The 2019 Vuelta a España was a three-week Grand Tour cycling stage race that took place in Spain, Andorra and France between 24 August and 15 September 2019. The race was the 74th edition of the Vuelta a España and is the final Grand Tour of the 2019 cycling season. The race started with a team time trial in Torrevieja on the Costa Blanca.

The race was won by Primož Roglič of Team Jumbo–Visma, making him the first Slovenian rider to win a Grand Tour. Rounding out the podium were Alejandro Valverde of Movistar Team in second and Roglič's compatriot Tadej Pogačar of UAE Team Emirates in third.

Along with the overall, Roglič also took the points classification. Geoffrey Bouchard of AG2R La Mondiale won the mountains classification, while Pogačar was the best young rider. Miguel Ángel López of Astana was named the overall most combative, and Movistar Team won the team classification.

== Teams ==
The 18 UCI WorldTeams are automatically invited to the race. In addition, four Professional Continental teams obtained a wildcard, bringing the number of teams to 22.

The teams that entered the race were:

UCI WorldTeams

- AG2R La Mondiale
- Astana
- Bahrain–Merida
- Bora–Hansgrohe
- CCC Team
- Deceuninck–Quick-Step
- EF Education First
- Groupama–FDJ
- Lotto–Soudal
- Mitchelton–Scott
- Movistar Team
- Team Dimension Data
- Team Ineos
- Team Jumbo–Visma
- Team Katusha–Alpecin
- Team Sunweb
- Trek–Segafredo
- UAE Team Emirates

UCI Professional Continental teams

- Burgos BH
- Caja Rural–Seguros RGA
- Cofidis
- Euskadi–Murias

== Pre-race favourites ==
The winner of the 2018 Vuelta a España, Simon Yates, had decided to not defend his title after riding in the 2019 Giro d'Italia and Tour de France. Steven Kruijswijk, Primož Roglič (Team Jumbo-Visma), Miguel Ángel López, Jakob Fuglsang (Astana) and Nairo Quintana (Movistar Team) were considered among the pre-race favourites. Fernando Gaviria (UAE Team Emirates) and Sam Bennett (Bora-Hansgrohe) were considered as potential stage winners and points classification contenders. Kruijswijk climbed on the podium of the 2019 Tour de France, while his team partner Roglič got third at the 2019 Giro d'Italia. López was on the podium on both the 2018 Giro d'Italia and the 2018 Vuelta a España.

There were three previous winners among the participating cyclists: Alejandro Valverde (2009), Fabio Aru (2015) and Nairo Quintana (2016). Valverde (Movistar Team) and Thomas De Gendt (Lotto-Soudal) also attempted to defend their points and mountain classification titles.

== Route ==
Stage characteristics and winners
Stage	Date	Course	Distance	Type	Winner
1	24 August	Salinas de Torrevieja to Torrevieja	13.4 km (8.3 mi)	Team time trial	(Kazakhstan) Astana
2	25 August	Benidorm to Calpe	199.6 km (124.0 mi)	Hilly stage	Nairo Quintana (COL)
3	26 August	Ibi to Alicante	188 km (116.8 mi)	Flat stage	Sam Bennett (IRL)
4	27 August	Cullera to El Puig	175.5 km (109.1 mi)	Flat stage	Fabio Jakobsen (NED)
5	28 August	L'Eliana to Observatorio Astrofísico de Javalambre	170.7 km (106.1 mi)	Hilly stage	Ángel Madrazo (ESP)
6	29 August	Mora de Rubielos to Ares del Maestrat	198.9 km (123.6 mi)	Hilly stage	Jesús Herrada (ESP)
7	30 August	Onda to Mas de la Costa	183.2 km (113.8 mi)	Mountain stage	Alejandro Valverde (ESP)
8	31 August	Valls to Igualada	166.9 km (103.7 mi)	Hilly stage	Nikias Arndt (GER)
9	1 September	Andorra la Vella (Andorra) to Cortals d'Encamp (Andorra)	94.4 km (58.7 mi)	Mountain stage	Tadej Pogačar (SLO)
	2 September	Andorra	Rest day		
10	3 September	Jurançon (France) to Pau (France)	36.2 km (22.5 mi)	Individual time trial	Primož Roglič (SLO)
11	4 September	Saint-Palais (France) to Urdax	180 km (111.8 mi)	Hilly stage	Mikel Iturria (ESP)
12	5 September	Circuito de Navarra to Bilbao	171.4 km (106.5 mi)	Hilly stage	Philippe Gilbert (BEL)
13	6 September	Bilbao to Los Machucos	166.4 km (103.4 mi)	Mountain stage	Tadej Pogačar (SLO)
14	7 September	San Vicente de la Barquera to Oviedo	188 km (116.8 mi)	Flat stage	Sam Bennett (IRL)
15	8 September	Tineo to Santuario del Acebo	154.4 km (95.9 mi)	Mountain stage	Sepp Kuss (USA)
16	9 September	Pravia to La Cubilla	144.4 km (89.7 mi)	Mountain stage	Jakob Fuglsang (DEN)
	10 September	León	Rest day		
17	11 September	Aranda de Duero to Guadalajara	219.6 km (136.5 mi)	Flat stage	Philippe Gilbert (BEL)
18	12 September	Colmenar Viejo to Becerril de la Sierra	177.5 km (110.3 mi)	Mountain stage	Sergio Higuita (COL)
19	13 September	Ávila to Toledo	165.2 km (102.7 mi)	Flat stage	Rémi Cavagna (FRA)
20	14 September	Arenas de San Pedro to Plataforma de Gredos	190.4 km (118.3 mi)	Mountain stage	Tadej Pogačar (SLO)
21	15 September	Fuenlabrada to Madrid	106.6 km (66.2 mi)	Flat stage	Fabio Jakobsen (NED)
Total			3,290.7 km (2,044.7 mi)		

== Classification leadership ==
The Vuelta a España has four individual classifications, for which jerseys were awarded daily to the leading rider, as well as a team competition. The primary classification is the general classification, which is calculated by adding each rider's finishing times on each stage. Time bonuses were awarded at the end of every stage apart from the team time trial (stage 1) and individual time trial (stage 10). The rider with the lowest cumulative time is the leader of the general classification, and wears the red jersey. The leader of the general classification at the end of the race is considered the overall winner of the Vuelta a España.

The second classification is the points classification. Riders receive points for finishing among the highest placed in a stage finish, or in intermediate sprints during the stages. The points available for each stage finish are determined by the stage's type. The leader is identified by a green jersey.

Mountains classification points
Category	1st	2nd	3rd	4th	5th	6th
Cima Alberto Fernández	20	15	10	6	4	2
Special-category	15	10	6	4	2	
First-category	10	6	4	2	1	
Second-category	5	3	1			
Third-category	3	2	1			

The next classification is the mountains classification. Points are awarded to the riders that reach the summit of the most difficult climbs first. The climbs are categorized, in order of increasing difficulty, third-, second-, and first- and special-category. The leader wears white jersey with blue polka dots.

The final of the individual classifications is the young rider classification, which is calculated by adding each rider's finishing times on each stage for each rider born on or after 1 January 1994. The rider with the lowest cumulative time is the leader of the young rider classification, and wears the white jersey.

There is also the team classification. After each stage, the times of the three highest finishers of each team are added together. The victory is awarded to the team with the lowest cumulative time at the end of the event.

In addition, there is one individual award: the combativity award. This award is given after each stage (excluding the team time trial and individual time trial) to the rider "who displayed the most generous effort and best sporting spirit." The daily winner wears a green number bib the following stage. At the end of the Vuelta, a jury decides the top three riders for the “Most Combative Rider of La Vuelta”, with a public vote deciding the victor.

Classification leadership by stage
Stage	Winner	General classification	Points classification	Mountains classification	Young rider classification	Team classification	Combativity award
1	Astana	Miguel Ángel López	not awarded	not awarded	Miguel Ángel López	Astana	Miguel Ángel López
2	Nairo Quintana	Nicolas Roche	Nairo Quintana	Ángel Madrazo	Miguel Ángel López	Team Sunweb	Ángel Madrazo
3	Sam Bennett	Nicolas Roche	Nairo Quintana	Ángel Madrazo	Miguel Ángel López	Team Sunweb	Ángel Madrazo
4	Fabio Jakobsen	Nicolas Roche	Sam Bennett	Ángel Madrazo	Miguel Ángel López	Team Sunweb	Jorge Cubero
5	Ángel Madrazo	Miguel Ángel López	Sam Bennett	Ángel Madrazo	Miguel Ángel López	Movistar Team	José Herrada
6	Jesús Herrada	Dylan Teuns	Sam Bennett	Ángel Madrazo	Miguel Ángel López	Movistar Team	Jesús Herrada
7	Alejandro Valverde	Miguel Ángel López	Nairo Quintana	Ángel Madrazo	Miguel Ángel López	Movistar Team	Sergio Henao
8	Nikias Arndt	Nicolas Edet	Nairo Quintana	Ángel Madrazo	Miguel Ángel López	Movistar Team	David de la Cruz
9	Tadej Pogačar	Nairo Quintana	Nairo Quintana	Ángel Madrazo	Miguel Ángel López	Movistar Team	Geoffrey Bouchard
10	Primož Roglič	Primož Roglič	Primož Roglič	Ángel Madrazo	Miguel Ángel López	Movistar Team	Primož Roglič
11	Mikel Iturria	Primož Roglič	Primož Roglič	Ángel Madrazo	Miguel Ángel López	Movistar Team	Alex Aranburu
12	Philippe Gilbert	Primož Roglič	Primož Roglič	Ángel Madrazo	Miguel Ángel López	Movistar Team	Philippe Gilbert
13	Tadej Pogačar	Primož Roglič	Primož Roglič	Ángel Madrazo	Tadej Pogačar	Movistar Team	Héctor Sáez
14	Sam Bennett	Primož Roglič	Primož Roglič	Ángel Madrazo	Tadej Pogačar	Movistar Team	Diego Rubio
15	Sepp Kuss	Primož Roglič	Primož Roglič	Ángel Madrazo	Tadej Pogačar	Movistar Team	Sergio Samitier
16	Jakob Fuglsang	Primož Roglič	Primož Roglič	Geoffrey Bouchard	Tadej Pogačar	Movistar Team	Ángel Madrazo
17	Philippe Gilbert	Primož Roglič	Primož Roglič	Geoffrey Bouchard	Tadej Pogačar	Movistar Team	Nairo Quintana
18	Sergio Higuita	Primož Roglič	Primož Roglič	Geoffrey Bouchard	Miguel Ángel López	Movistar Team	Sergio Higuita
19	Rémi Cavagna	Primož Roglič	Primož Roglič	Geoffrey Bouchard	Miguel Ángel López	Movistar Team	Rémi Cavagna
20	Tadej Pogačar	Primož Roglič	Primož Roglič	Geoffrey Bouchard	Tadej Pogačar	Movistar Team	Tao Geoghegan Hart
21	Fabio Jakobsen	Primož Roglič	Primož Roglič	Geoffrey Bouchard	Tadej Pogačar	Movistar Team	not awarded
Final		Primož Roglič	Primož Roglič	Geoffrey Bouchard	Tadej Pogačar	Movistar Team	Miguel Ángel López

- On stage two, Dario Cataldo and Jakob Fuglsang, who were second in the general classification, wore the green jersey and white with blue polka-dot jersey respectively, although no points were awarded during the opening team time trial stage for either ranking.
- On stage two, James Knox, who was second in the young rider classification, wore the white jersey, because first placed Miguel Ángel López wore the red jersey as leader of the general classification. On stages six and eight, Tadej Pogačar wore the white jersey for the same reason.
- On stage ten, Primož Roglič, who was second in the points classification, wore the green jersey, because first placed Nairo Quintana wore the red jersey as leader of the general classification.
- On stages eleven, twelve, and thirteen, Nairo Quintana, who was second in the points classification, wore the green jersey, because first placed Primož Roglič wore the red jersey as leader of the general classification. On stage nineteen, Tadej Pogačar wore the green jersey for the same reason.
- On stages fourteen and fifteen, Nairo Quintana, who was third in the points classification, wore the green jersey, because first placed Primož Roglič wore the red jersey as leader of the general classification, and second placed Tadej Pogačar wore the white jersey as leader of the young rider classification.
- On stages sixteen and seventeen, Nairo Quintana, who was fourth in the points classification, wore the green jersey, because first placed Primož Roglič wore the red jersey as leader of the general classification, second placed Tadej Pogačar wore the white jersey as leader of the young rider classification, and third placed Alejandro Valverde wore the World Champion jersey.
- On stage eighteen, Nairo Quintana, who was fourth in the points classification, wore the green jersey, because first placed Primož Roglič wore the red jersey as leader of the general classification, second placed Sam Bennett wore the Irish National Road Race Champion jersey, and third placed Tadej Pogačar wore the white jersey as leader of the young rider classification.
- On stage nineteen, Tadej Pogačar, who was second in the points classification, wore the green jersey, because first placed Primož Roglič wore the red jersey as leader of the general classification.
- On stage twenty, Tadej Pogačar, who was fourth in the points classification, wore the green jersey, because first placed Primož Roglič wore the red jersey as leader of the general classification, second placed Sam Bennett wore the Irish National Road Race Champion jersey, and third placed Alejandro Valverde wore the World Champion jersey.
- On stage twenty-one, Nairo Quintana, who was fifth in the points classification, wore the green jersey, because first placed Primož Roglič wore the red jersey as leader of the general classification, second placed Tadej Pogačar wore the white jersey as leader of the young rider classification, third placed Alejandro Valverde wore the World Champion jersey, and fourth placed Sam Bennett wore the Irish National Road Race Champion jersey.

== Final classification standings ==
Legend
	Denotes the winner of the general classification
	Denotes the winner of the points classification
	Denotes the winner of the mountains classification
	Denotes the winner of the young rider classification
A white jersey with a red number bib.	Denotes the winner of the team classification
A white jersey with a yellow number bib.	Denotes the winner of the combativity award

=== General classification ===
Final general classification (1–10)
Rank	Rider	Team	Time
1	Primož Roglič (SLO)	Team Jumbo–Visma	83h 07' 14"
2	Alejandro Valverde (ESP)	Movistar Team	+ 2' 33"
3	Tadej Pogačar (SLO)	UAE Team Emirates	+ 2' 55"
4	Nairo Quintana (COL)	Movistar Team	+ 3' 46"
5	Miguel Ángel López (COL)	Astana	+ 4' 48"
6	Rafał Majka (POL)	Bora–Hansgrohe	+ 7' 33"
7	Wilco Kelderman (NED)	Team Sunweb	+ 10' 04"
8	Carl Fredrik Hagen (NOR)	Lotto–Soudal	+ 12' 54"
9	Marc Soler (ESP)	Movistar Team	+ 22' 27"
10	Mikel Nieve (ESP)	Mitchelton–Scott	+ 22' 34"

Final general classification (11–153)
Rank	Rider	Team	Time
11	James Knox (GBR)	Deceuninck–Quick-Step	+ 22' 55"
12	Dylan Teuns (BEL)	Bahrain–Merida	+ 24' 06"
13	Jakob Fuglsang (DEN)	Astana	+ 26' 49"
14	Sergio Higuita (COL)	EF Education First	+ 32' 17"
15	Hermann Pernsteiner (AUT)	Bahrain–Merida	+ 33' 40"
16	Ion Izagirre (ESP)	Astana	+ 42' 00"
17	Ruben Guerreiro (POR)	Team Katusha–Alpecin	+ 42' 05"
18	Nicolas Edet (FRA)	Cofidis	+ 46' 24"
19	Esteban Chaves (COL)	Mitchelton–Scott	+ 53' 03"
20	Tao Geoghegan Hart (GBR)	Team Ineos	+ 1h 04' 21"
21	Kilian Frankiny (SUI)	Groupama–FDJ	+ 1h 11' 42"
22	Óscar Rodríguez (ESP)	Euskadi–Murias	+ 1h 13' 14"
23	Luis León Sánchez (ESP)	Astana	+ 1h 17' 09"
24	François Bidard (FRA)	AG2R La Mondiale	+ 1h 25' 44"
25	Ben O'Connor (AUS)	Team Dimension Data	+ 1h 25' 53"
26	Martijn Tusveld (NED)	Team Sunweb	+ 1h 27' 32"
27	Robert Gesink (NED)	Team Jumbo–Visma	+ 1h 29' 07"
28	Peter Stetina (USA)	Trek–Segafredo	+ 1h 32' 25"
29	Sepp Kuss (USA)	Team Jumbo–Visma	+ 1h 35' 33"
30	José Joaquín Rojas (ESP)	Movistar Team	+ 1h 44' 02"
31	Neilson Powless (USA)	Team Jumbo–Visma	+ 1h 48' 21"
32	Philippe Gilbert (BEL)	Deceuninck–Quick-Step	+ 1h 50' 02"
33	George Bennett (NZL)	Team Jumbo–Visma	+ 1h 55' 19"
34	Wout Poels (NED)	Team Ineos	+ 1h 58' 10"
35	Pierre Latour (FRA)	AG2R La Mondiale	+ 1h 59' 04"
36	Felix Großschartner (AUT)	Bora–Hansgrohe	+ 2h 03' 33"
37	Niklas Eg (DEN)	Trek–Segafredo	+ 2h 04' 41"
38	Ben King (USA)	Team Dimension Data	+ 2h 10' 03"
39	Sebastián Henao (COL)	Team Ineos	+ 2h 12' 22"
40	Daniel Navarro (ESP)	Team Katusha–Alpecin	+ 2h 12' 29"
41	Daniel Martínez (COL)	EF Education First	+ 2h 13' 20"
42	Gianluca Brambilla (ITA)	Trek–Segafredo	+ 2h 16' 17"
43	Antonio Pedrero (ESP)	Movistar Team	+ 2h 20' 11"
44	Tobias Ludvigsson (SWE)	Groupama–FDJ	+ 2h 20' 23"
45	Sergio Henao (COL)	UAE Team Emirates	+ 2h 20' 29"
46	Nelson Oliveira (POR)	Movistar Team	+ 2h 21' 16"
47	Geoffrey Bouchard (FRA)	AG2R La Mondiale	+ 2h 25' 49"
48	Mikel Bizkarra (ESP)	Euskadi–Murias	+ 2h 28' 43"
49	Damien Howson (AUS)	Mitchelton–Scott	+ 2h 29' 32"
50	Cristián Rodríguez (ESP)	Caja Rural–Seguros RGA	+ 2h 29' 33"
51	Louis Meintjes (SAF)	Team Dimension Data	+ 2h 34' 53"
52	Rémi Cavagna (FRA)	Deceuninck–Quick-Step	+ 2h 35' 04"
53	Gorka Izagirre (ESP)	Astana	+ 2h 37' 30"
54	Matteo Fabbro (ITA)	Team Katusha–Alpecin	+ 2h 37' 58"
55	Zdeněk Štybar (CZE)	Deceuninck–Quick-Step	+ 2h 39' 31"
56	Thomas De Gendt (BEL)	Lotto–Soudal	+ 2h 40' 02"
57	Paweł Poljański (POL)	Bora–Hansgrohe	+ 2h 44' 06"
58	Clément Chevrier (FRA)	AG2R La Mondiale	+ 2h 49' 02"
59	Lawson Craddock (USA)	EF Education First	+ 2h 49' 16"
60	Jonas Koch (GER)	CCC Team	+ 2h 51' 21"
61	Darwin Atapuma (COL)	Cofidis	+ 2h 51' 36"
62	Tsgabu Grmay (ETH)	Mitchelton–Scott	+ 2h 52' 26"
63	Nick Schultz (AUS)	Mitchelton–Scott	+ 2h 52' 42"
64	Imanol Erviti (ESP)	Movistar Team	+ 2h 53' 02"
65	Tosh Van der Sande (BEL)	Lotto–Soudal	+ 2h 53' 26"
66	David de la Cruz (ESP)	Team Ineos	+ 2h 53' 50"
67	Steve Morabito (SUI)	Groupama–FDJ	+ 3h 02' 11"
68	Dario Cataldo (ITA)	Astana	+ 3h 06' 30"
69	Nikias Arndt (GER)	Team Sunweb	+ 3h 06' 44"
70	Valerio Conti (ITA)	UAE Team Emirates	+ 3h 08' 00"
71	Owain Doull (GBR)	Team Ineos	+ 3h 08' 12"
72	Silvan Dillier (SUI)	AG2R La Mondiale	+ 3h 09' 54"
73	Sander Armée (BEL)	Lotto–Soudal	+ 3h 10' 27"
74	Tomasz Marczyński (POL)	Lotto–Soudal	+ 3h 15' 09"
75	José Herrada (ESP)	Cofidis	+ 3h 20' 26"
76	Steff Cras (BEL)	Team Katusha–Alpecin	+ 3h 21' 04"
77	Dorian Godon (FRA)	AG2R La Mondiale	+ 3h 22' 00"
78	Tim Declercq (BEL)	Deceuninck–Quick-Step	+ 3h 27' 05"
79	Omar Fraile (ESP)	Astana	+ 3h 27' 25"
80	Romain Seigle (FRA)	Groupama–FDJ	+ 3h 28' 02"
81	Quentin Jaurégui (FRA)	AG2R La Mondiale	+ 3h 28' 13"
82	Héctor Sáez (ESP)	Euskadi–Murias	+ 3h 28' 53"
83	Dion Smith (NZL)	Mitchelton–Scott	+ 3h 29' 59"
84	Mark Padun (UKR)	Bahrain–Merida	+ 3h 30' 25"
85	Jacopo Mosca (ITA)	Trek–Segafredo	+ 3h 30' 55"
86	Cyril Barthe (FRA)	Euskadi–Murias	+ 3h 31' 36"
87	Mikel Iturria (ESP)	Euskadi–Murias	+ 3h 31' 50"
88	Sergio Pardilla (ESP)	Caja Rural–Seguros RGA	+ 3h 32' 24"
89	Salvatore Puccio (ITA)	Team Ineos	+ 3h 33' 38"
90	Clément Venturini (FRA)	AG2R La Mondiale	+ 3h 37' 27"
91	Bruno Armirail (FRA)	Groupama–FDJ	+ 3h 38' 04"
92	Robert Power (AUS)	Team Sunweb	+ 3h 38' 42"
93	Jorge Arcas (ESP)	Movistar Team	+ 3h 39' 12"
94	Alex Aranburu (ESP)	Caja Rural–Seguros RGA	+ 3h 39' 43"
95	Fernando Barceló (ESP)	Euskadi–Murias	+ 3h 40' 19"
96	Edvald Boasson Hagen (NOR)	Team Dimension Data	+ 3h 40' 52"
97	Francisco Ventoso (ESP)	CCC Team	+ 3h 41' 38"
98	Pavel Kochetkov (RUS)	Team Katusha–Alpecin	+ 3h 42' 27"
99	Michael Storer (AUS)	Team Sunweb	+ 3h 50' 04"
100	Sam Bewley (NZL)	Mitchelton–Scott	+ 3h 51' 31"
101	Jonathan Lastra (ESP)	Caja Rural–Seguros RGA	+ 3h 57' 29"
102	Luis Ángel Maté (ESP)	Cofidis	+ 3h 57' 38"
103	Casper Pedersen (DEN)	Team Sunweb	+ 4h 00' 14"
104	Jetse Bol (NED)	Burgos BH	+ 4h 04' 01"
105	Ricardo Vilela (POR)	Burgos BH	+ 4h 04' 41"
106	Ian Stannard (GBR)	Team Ineos	+ 4h 05' 25"
107	Nic Dlamini (SAF)	Team Dimension Data	+ 4h 05' 44"
108	Damien Touzé (FRA)	Cofidis	+ 4h 08' 25"
109	Luka Pibernik (SLO)	Bahrain–Merida	+ 4h 12' 17"
110	Yukiya Arashiro (JPN)	Bahrain–Merida	+ 4h 13' 18"
111	Sergey Chernetskiy (RUS)	Caja Rural–Seguros RGA	+ 4h 14' 38"
112	Sergio Samitier (ESP)	Euskadi–Murias	+ 4h 16' 49"
113	Enrico Battaglin (ITA)	Team Katusha–Alpecin	+ 4h 18' 37"
114	Nathan Van Hooydonck (BEL)	CCC Team	+ 4h 20' 35"
115	Harm Vanhoucke (BEL)	Lotto–Soudal	+ 4h 20' 46"
116	Óscar Cabedo (ESP)	Burgos BH	+ 4h 21' 49"
117	Aritz Bagües (ESP)	Euskadi–Murias	+ 4h 22' 14"
118	Willie Smit (SAF)	Team Katusha–Alpecin	+ 4h 23' 33"
119	Ángel Madrazo (ESP)	Burgos BH	+ 4h 24' 11"
120	Jesús Ezquerra (ESP)	Burgos BH	+ 4h 26' 12"
121	Eros Capecchi (ITA)	Deceuninck–Quick-Step	+ 4h 26' 16"
122	Mitchell Docker (AUS)	EF Education First	+ 4h 26' 59"
123	Domen Novak (SLO)	Bahrain–Merida	+ 4h 27' 28"
124	John Degenkolb (GER)	Trek–Segafredo	+ 4h 28' 32"
125	Alex Kirsch (LUX)	Trek–Segafredo	+ 4h 29' 56"
126	Logan Owen (USA)	EF Education First	+ 4h 31' 27"
127	Stéphane Rossetto (FRA)	Cofidis	+ 4h 31' 47"
128	Manuele Boaro (ITA)	Astana	+ 4h 32' 50"
129	Jaco Venter (SAF)	Team Dimension Data	+ 4h 33' 59"
130	Rasmus Tiller (NOR)	Team Dimension Data	+ 4h 34' 22"
131	Will Barta (USA)	CCC Team	+ 4h 36' 26"
132	Heinrich Haussler (AUS)	Bahrain–Merida	+ 4h 37' 44"
133	Edward Theuns (BEL)	Trek–Segafredo	+ 4h 39' 26"
134	Sam Bennett (IRL)	Bora–Hansgrohe	+ 4h 41' 44"
135	Gonzalo Serrano (ESP)	Caja Rural–Seguros RGA	+ 4h 42' 56"
136	Jorge Cubero (ESP)	Burgos BH	+ 4h 45' 34"
137	Maximilian Walscheid (GER)	Team Sunweb	+ 4h 46' 52"
138	Vyacheslav Kuznetsov (RUS)	Team Katusha–Alpecin	+ 4h 50' 26"
139	Marc Sarreau (FRA)	Groupama–FDJ	+ 4h 56' 21"
140	Jon Aberasturi (ESP)	Caja Rural–Seguros RGA	+ 4h 59' 08"
141	Kiel Reijnen (USA)	Trek–Segafredo	+ 4h 59' 41"
142	Szymon Sajnok (POL)	CCC Team	+ 5h 01' 03"
143	Juan Sebastián Molano (COL)	UAE Team Emirates	+ 5h 01' 03"
144	Jelle Wallays (BEL)	Lotto–Soudal	+ 5h 03' 52"
145	Fabio Jakobsen (NED)	Deceuninck–Quick-Step	+ 5h 06' 45"
146	Diego Rubio (ESP)	Burgos BH	+ 5h 07' 04"
147	Fernando Gaviria (COL)	UAE Team Emirates	+ 5h 11' 32"
148	Maximiliano Richeze (ARG)	Deceuninck–Quick-Step	+ 5h 20' 32"
149	Paweł Bernas (POL)	CCC Team	+ 5h 22' 19"
150	Oliviero Troia (ITA)	UAE Team Emirates	+ 5h 25' 27"
151	Shane Archbold (NZL)	Bora–Hansgrohe	+ 5h 30' 01"
152	Lennard Hofstede (NED)	Team Jumbo–Visma	+ 5h 40' 23"
153	Nuno Matos (POR)	Burgos BH	+ 5h 56' 19"

=== Points classification ===
Final points classification (1–10)
Rank	Rider	Team	Points
1	Primož Roglič (SLO)	Team Jumbo–Visma	155
2	Tadej Pogačar (SLO)	UAE Team Emirates	136
3	Sam Bennett (IRL)	Bora–Hansgrohe	134
4	Alejandro Valverde (ESP)	Movistar Team	132
5	Nairo Quintana (COL)	Movistar Team	100
6	Miguel Ángel López (COL)	Astana	76
7	Philippe Gilbert (BEL)	Deceuninck–Quick-Step	73
8	Dylan Teuns (BEL)	Bahrain–Merida	69
9	Tosh Van der Sande (BEL)	Lotto–Soudal	63
10	Sergio Higuita (COL)	EF Education First	62

=== Mountains classification ===
Final mountains classification (1–10)
Rank	Rider	Team	Points
1	Geoffrey Bouchard (FRA)	AG2R La Mondiale	76
2	Ángel Madrazo (ESP)	Burgos BH	44
3	Sergio Samitier (ESP)	Euskadi–Murias	42
4	Tadej Pogačar (SLO)	UAE Team Emirates	38
5	Tao Geoghegan Hart (GBR)	Team Ineos	35
6	Wout Poels (NED)	Team Ineos	31
7	Alejandro Valverde (ESP)	Movistar Team	29
8	Sergio Henao (COL)	UAE Team Emirates	27
9	Jakob Fuglsang (DEN)	Astana	24
10	Mikel Bizkarra (ESP)	Euskadi–Murias	22

=== Young rider classification ===
Final young rider classification (1–10)
Rank	Rider	Team	Time
1	Tadej Pogačar (SLO)	UAE Team Emirates	83h 10' 09"
2	Miguel Ángel López (COL)	Astana	+ 1' 53"
3	James Knox (GBR)	Deceuninck–Quick-Step	+ 20' 00"
4	Sergio Higuita (COL)	EF Education First	+ 29' 22"
5	Ruben Guerreiro (POR)	Team Katusha–Alpecin	+ 39' 10"
6	Tao Geoghegan Hart (GBR)	Team Ineos	+ 1h 01' 26"
7	Kilian Frankiny (SUI)	Groupama–FDJ	+ 1h 08' 47"
8	Óscar Rodríguez (ESP)	Euskadi–Murias	+ 1h 10' 19"
9	Ben O'Connor (AUS)	Team Dimension Data	+ 1h 22' 58"
10	Sepp Kuss (USA)	Team Jumbo–Visma	+ 1h 32' 38"

=== Team classification ===
Final team classification (1–10)
Rank	Team	Time
1	(Spain) Movistar Team	248h 26' 24"
2	(Kazakhstan) Astana	+ 51' 38"
3	(Netherlands) Team Jumbo–Visma	+ 2h 03' 42"
4	(Australia) Mitchelton–Scott	+ 2h 26' 47"
5	(France) AG2R La Mondiale	+ 3h 14' 09"
6	(Germany) Team Sunweb	+ 3h 20' 01"
7	(Spain) Euskadi–Murias	+ 3h 38' 55"
8	Bahrain–Merida	+ 3h 45' 14"
9	(South Africa) Team Dimension Data	+ 3h 55' 52"
10	(United Kingdom) Team Ineos	+ 4h 00' 34"

== Sources ==
La Vuelta 2019 Roadbook. Unipublic. 2019.
