= Mikel Iturria =

Spanish cyclist (born 1992)

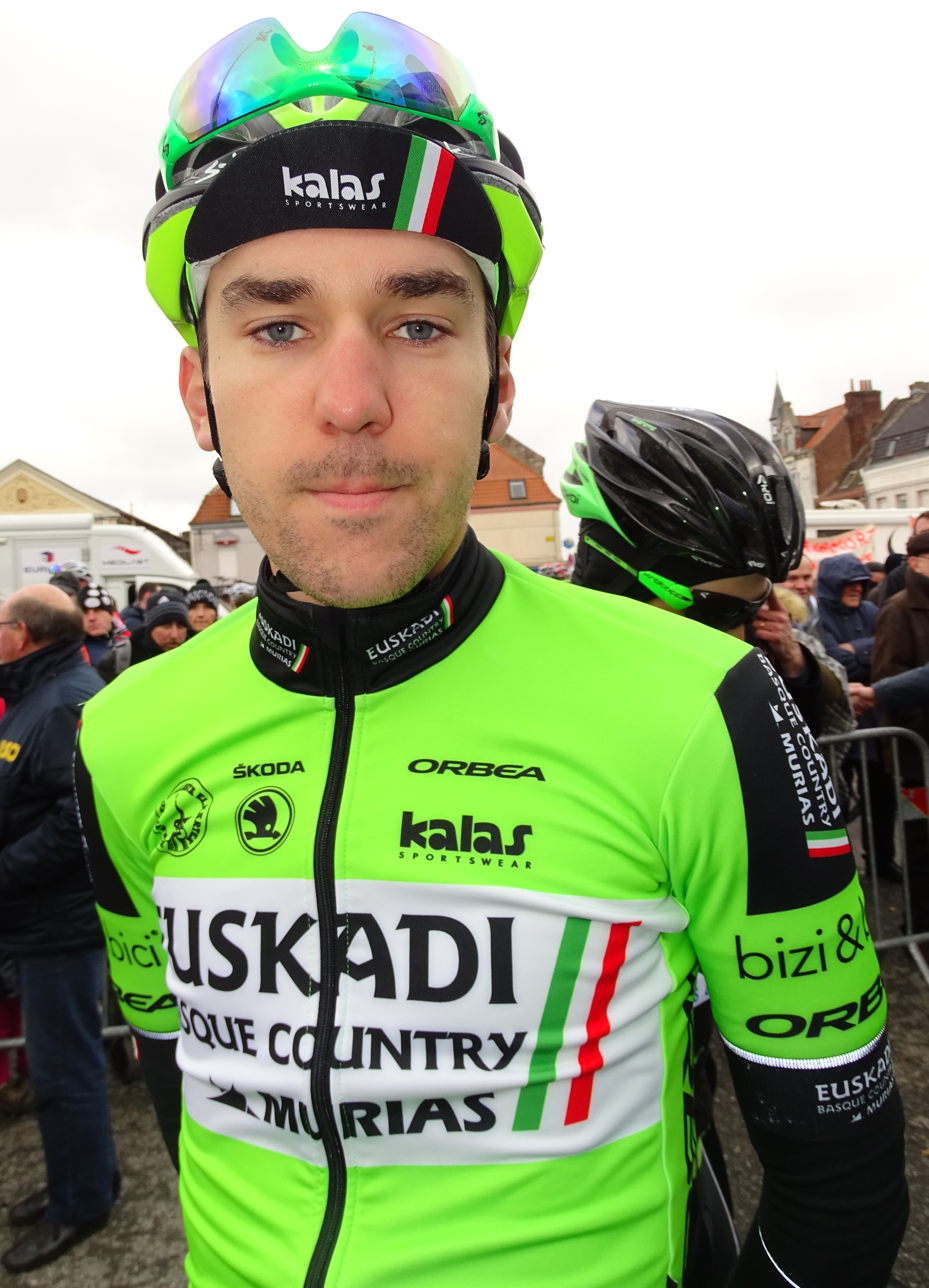
- Iturria in 2016.

Personal information
- Full name: Mikel Iturria Segurola
- Born: 16 March 1992 (age 34) Urnieta, Spain
- Height: 1.85 m (6 ft 1 in)
- Weight: 67 kg (148 lb)

Cycling career
- Sport: Cycling
- Current team: Euskaltel–Euskadi
- Discipline: Road
- Role: Rider
- Rider type: Climber

Amateur teams
- 2011: Belca
- 2012: Naturgas Energía
- 2015: Fundación Euskadi–EDP

Professional teams
- 2013–2014: Euskadi
- 2016–2019: Euskadi Basque Country–Murias
- 2020–: Fundación–Orbea

Major wins
- Grand Tours Vuelta a España 1 individual stage (2019)

Mikel Iturria Segurola (born 16 March 1992 in Urnieta) is a Spanish cyclist, who currently rides for UCI ProTeam Euskaltel–Euskadi. In August 2018, he was named in the startlist for the Vuelta a España.

== Major results ==
2013
7th Overall Ronde de l'Isard
7th Giro della Valle d'Aosta
8th Overall Vuelta a la Comunidad de Madrid U23
2019
1st Stage 11 Vuelta a España
7th Klasika Primavera
2021
3rd Trofeo Andratx – Mirador d'Es Colomer
5th Prueba Villafranca - Ordiziako Klasika

=== Grand Tour general classification results timeline ===
| Grand Tour | 2018 | 2019 | 2020 | 2021 | 2022 |
|---|---|---|---|---|---|
| Giro d'Italia | — | — | — | — | — |
| Tour de France | — | — | — | — | — |
| Vuelta a España | 103 | 87 | — | 60 | 93 |

Legend
| — | Did not compete |
| DNF | Did not finish |
