= Jonas Koch =

German road cyclist

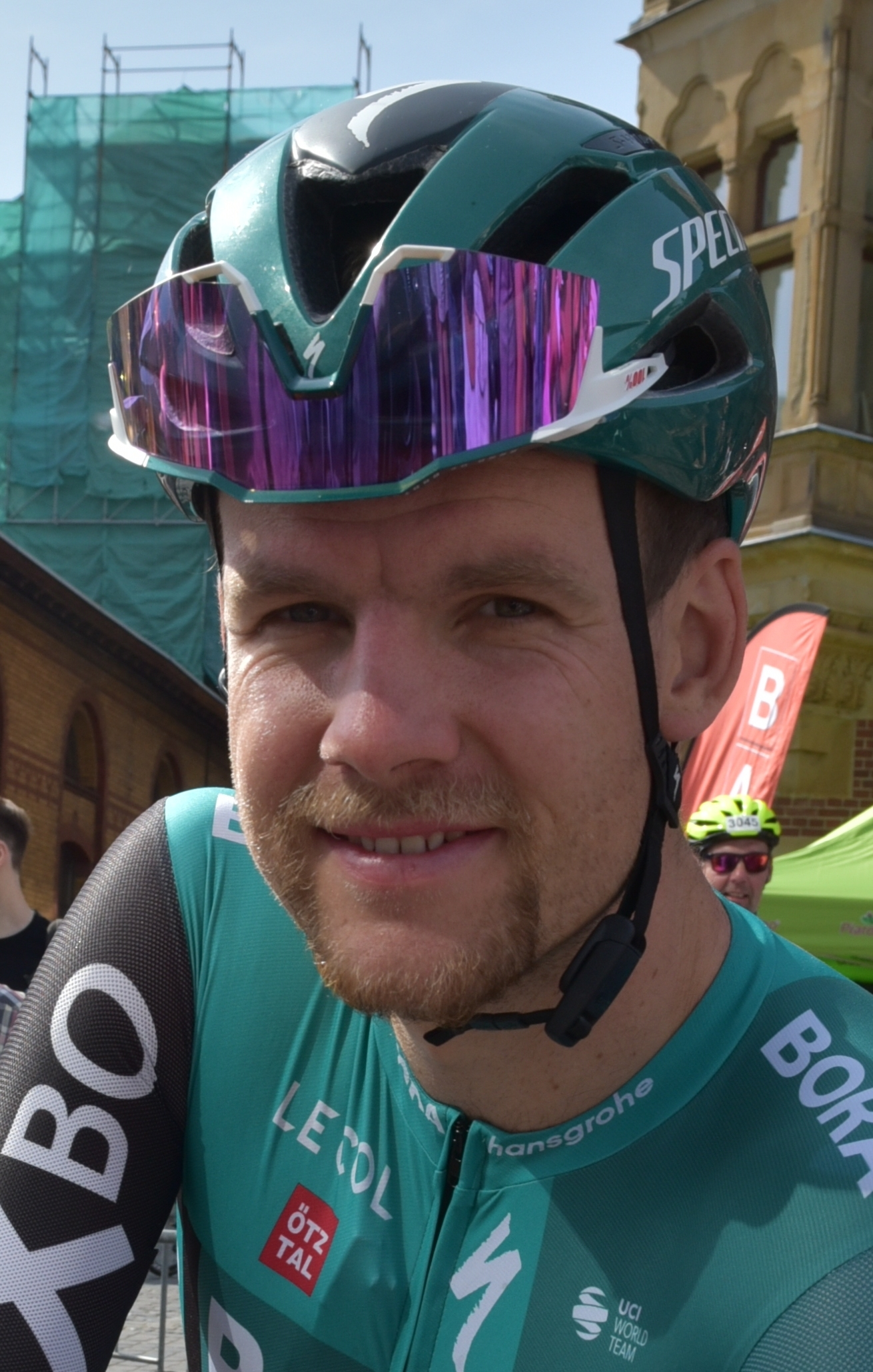
- Koch in 2022

Personal information
- Full name: Jonas Koch
- Born: 25 June 1993 (age 33) Schwäbisch Hall, Germany

Cycling career
- Sport: Cycling
- Discipline: Road
- Role: Rider

Professional teams
- 2012: Specialized Concept Store
- 2013–2014: LKT Team Brandenburg
- 2015: Rad-Net Rose Team
- 2016: Verva ActiveJet
- 2017–2018: CCC–Sprandi–Polkowice
- 2019–2020: CCC Team
- 2021: Intermarché–Wanty–Gobert Matériaux
- 2022–2025: Bora–Hansgrohe

Jonas Koch (born 25 June 1993 in Schwäbisch Hall) is a former German cyclist, who most recently rode for UCI WorldTeam Red Bull–Bora–Hansgrohe. In August 2019, he was named in the startlist for the 2019 Vuelta a España. In August 2020, he was named in the startlist for the 2020 Tour de France.

For the 2021 season, Koch move to Intermarché–Wanty–Gobert Matériaux team who brought the license of his previous team.

== Major results ==
2015
Tour de l'Avenir

1st Points classification
1st Stage 1

5th Coppa dei Laghi-Trofeo Almar
2016
4th Overall Tour des Fjords
2017
9th Trofeo Playa de Palma
2018
8th Overall Tour of Norway
9th London–Surrey Classic
10th Handzame Classic
10th Brussels Cycling Classic
10th Coppa Bernocchi
2019
1st Points classification, Tour of Austria
7th Tour de l'Eurométropole
7th Halle–Ingooigem
2020
1st Mountains classification, Tour de la Provence
2021
2nd Road race, National Road Championships
10th Overall Deutschland Tour
2022
4th Vuelta a Murcia
2023
10th Münsterland Giro

=== Grand Tour general classification results timeline ===
Grand Tour	2019	2020	2021	2022	2023	2024
Giro d'Italia	—	—	—	—	—	100
Tour de France	—	125	DNF	—	—	
Vuelta a España	60	—	—	99	93	

Legend
—	Did not compete
DNF	Did not finish
