= Rémi Cavagna =

French cyclist

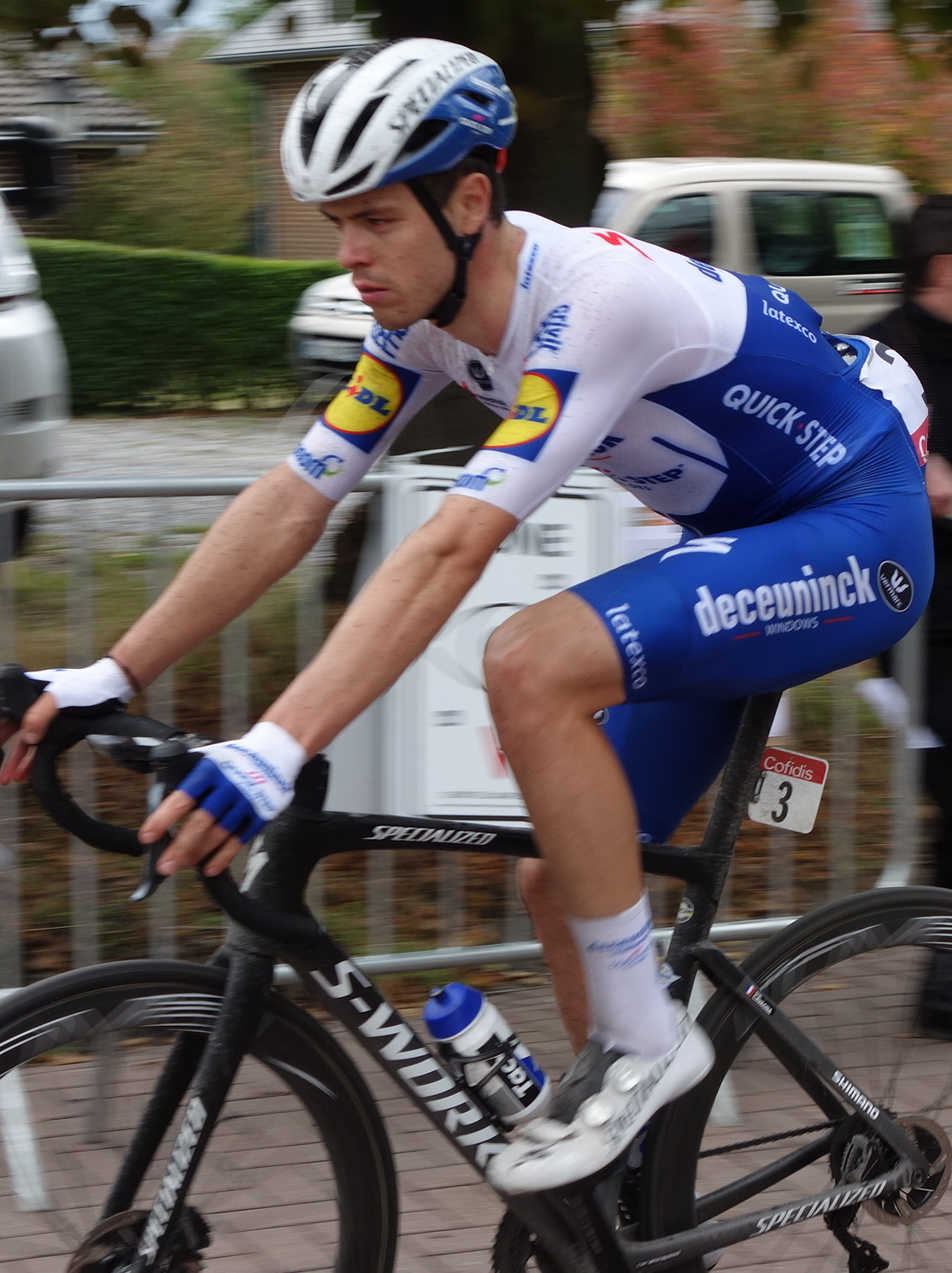
- Cavagna in 2020

Personal information
- Full name: Rémi Cavagna
- Nickname: TGV de Clermont-Ferrand (Clermont-Ferrand TGV)
- Born: 10 August 1995 (age 31) Clermont-Ferrand, France
- Height: 1.86 m (6 ft 1 in)
- Weight: 78 kg (172 lb)

Cycling career
- Sport: Cycling
- Current team: Groupama–FDJ United
- Discipline: Road
- Role: Rider
- Rider type: Time trialist; Rouleur

Amateur teams
- 2012–2013: VC Cournon d'Auvergne Junior
- 2014–2015: Pro Immo Nicolas Roux

Professional teams
- 2016: Klein Constantia
- 2017–2023: Quick-Step Floors
- 2024: Movistar Team
- 2025–: Groupama–FDJ

Major wins
- Grand Tours Vuelta a España 1 individual stage (2019) Combativity award (2020) One-day races and Classics National Road Race Championships (2021) National Time Trial Championships (2020, 2023, 2026) Ardèche Classic (2020)
Medal record
Men's road bicycle racing
Representing France
World Championships
Silver medal – second place	2023 Glasgow	Mixed team relay
European Championships
Gold medal – first place	2023 Drenthe	Mixed team relay
Gold medal – first place	2025 Guilherand-Granges	Mixed team relay
Silver medal – second place	2020 Plouay	Time trial

Rémi Cavagna (born 10 August 1995) is a French cyclist, who currently rides for UCI WorldTeam Groupama–FDJ United.

== Career ==
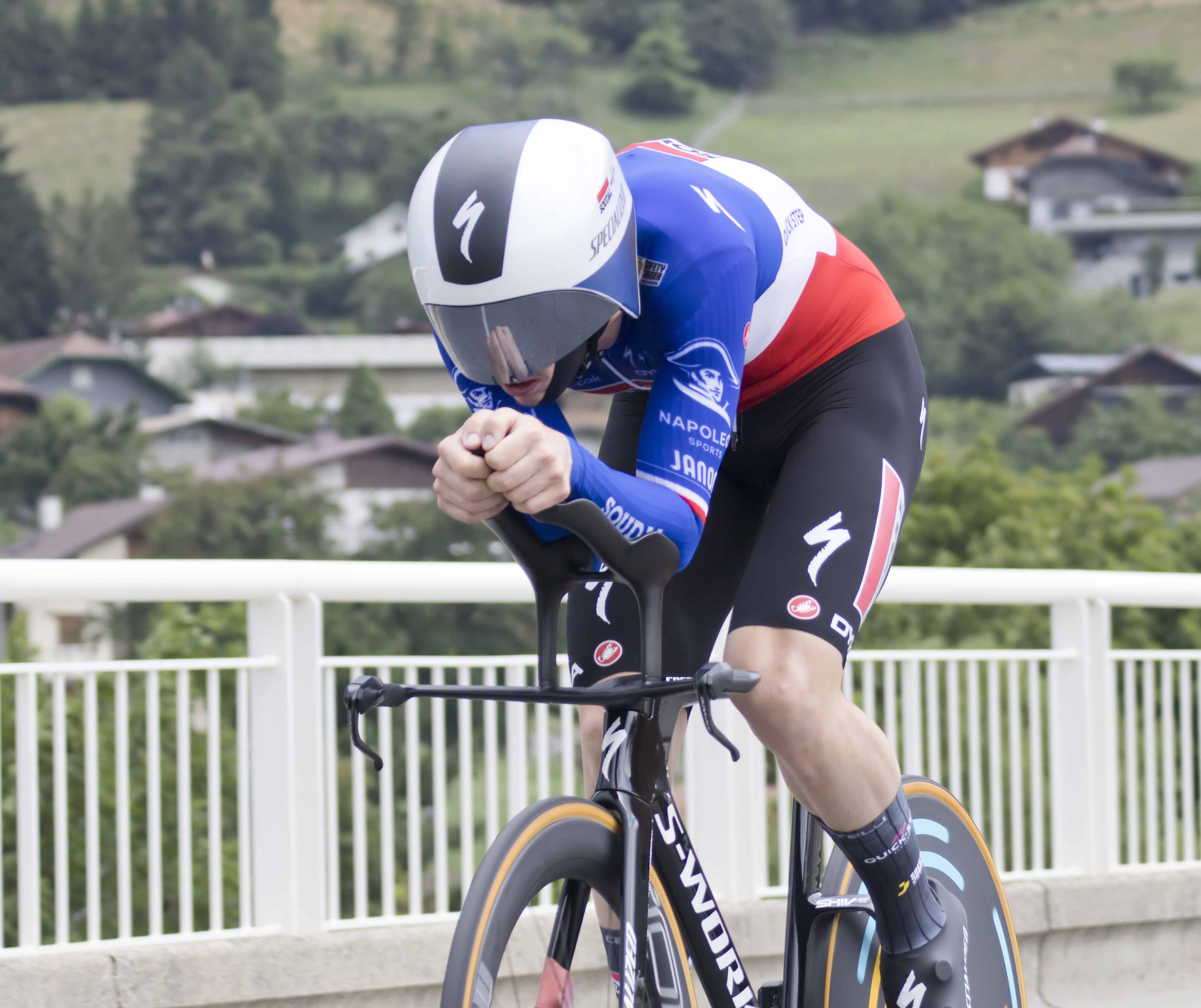
Cavagna at the 2023 Tour de France

On 19 July 2016, UCI World Tour team Quick-Step Floors announced the signing of Cavagna for the 2017 season. In May 2018, he was named in the startlist for the 2018 Giro d'Italia. In August 2019, he was named in the startlist for the 2019 Vuelta a España. In August 2020, he was named in the startlist for the 2020 Tour de France.

At the 2021 tour of Poland, Remi won stage 6 of the race.

At the 2023 Tour of Slovakia, Remi won the opening stage of the race and finished the tour in first place. Later in the year he won the French time trial championships ahead of Bruno Armirail.

In October 2023, Rémi and Davide Formolo were among seven new signings for Spanish team Movistar for 2024, and the former left his team Soudal Quick-Step at the end of the 2023 season.

In June 2024, Cavagna said that "I came to the team to progress and I feel like I’ve taken a step backwards”. It seemed that he was also struggling with a language barrier, with the team radios being in Spanish, and last minute changes to his programme were reasons for struggles during the season.

Cavagna will leave Movistar Team at the end of the 2024 season, due to having a bad relationship with them, despite signing a 3-year contract up until the end of 2026. He is set to join Groupama–FDJ having signed a two-year deal.

== Major results ==
2013
3rd Time trial, UEC European Junior Road Championships
3rd Overall Trophée Centre Morbihan

1st Stage 2

5th Chrono Champenois Juniors
2014
1st Time trial, National University Championships
2nd Time trial, National Under-23 Road Championships
2nd Chrono des Nations Espoirs
2015
1st Time trial, National Under-23 Road Championships
8th Time trial, UEC European Under-23 Road Championships
2016
1st Time trial, National Under-23 Road Championships
1st Overall Tour de Berlin

1st Stage 3a

1st Stage 5 Volta ao Alentejo
1st Stage 1 Circuit des Ardennes
2nd Overall Paris–Arras Tour

1st Young rider classification
1st Stage 3

2nd Stage Course de Solidarność et des Champions Olympiques
7th Duo Normand
8th Overall ZLM Roompot Tour
2017
2nd Overall Tour of Belgium
6th Binche–Chimay–Binche
2018 (1 pro win)
1st Dwars door West–Vlaanderen
4th Overall Tour of Guangxi
9th Overall Vuelta a San Juan
2019 (2)
Vuelta a España

1st Stage 19
Combativity award Stage 19

1st Stage 3 Tour of California
5th Time trial, National Road Championships
2020 (2)
1st Time trial, National Road Championships
1st Ardèche Classic
2nd Time trial, UEC European Road Championships
7th Time trial, UCI Road World Championships
Combativity award Stage 19 Tour de France
Combativity award Vuelta a España Stage 16 & Overall
2021 (3)
1st Road race, National Road Championships
1st Stage 5 (ITT) Tour de Romandie
1st Stage 6 (ITT) Tour de Pologne
9th Time trial, UEC European Road Championships
2022
2nd Time trial, National Road Championships
6th Overall Tour de Pologne
2023 (5)
UEC European Road Championships

1st Team relay
8th Time trial

1st Time trial, National Road Championships
1st Overall Okolo Slovenska

1st Stage 1

Settimana Internazionale di Coppi e Bartali

1st Stages 1 & 5 (ITT)

2nd Team relay, UCI Road World Championships
4th Brabantse Pijl
4th Chrono des Nations
2024
4th Time trial, National Road Championships
2025
4th Time trial, National Road Championships
4th Chrono des Nations
2026 (1)
1st Time trial, National Road Championships
2nd Team relay, UCI Road World Championships

=== Grand Tour general classification results timeline ===
Grand Tour	2018	2019	2020	2021	2022	2023	2024	2025
Giro d'Italia	115	—	—	68	—	—	—	—
Tour de France	—	—	113	—	—	106	—	—
Vuelta a España	—	52	84	—	—	—	—	124

Legend
—	Did not compete
DNF	Did not finish
