= Mikel Nieve =

Spanish road bicycle racer

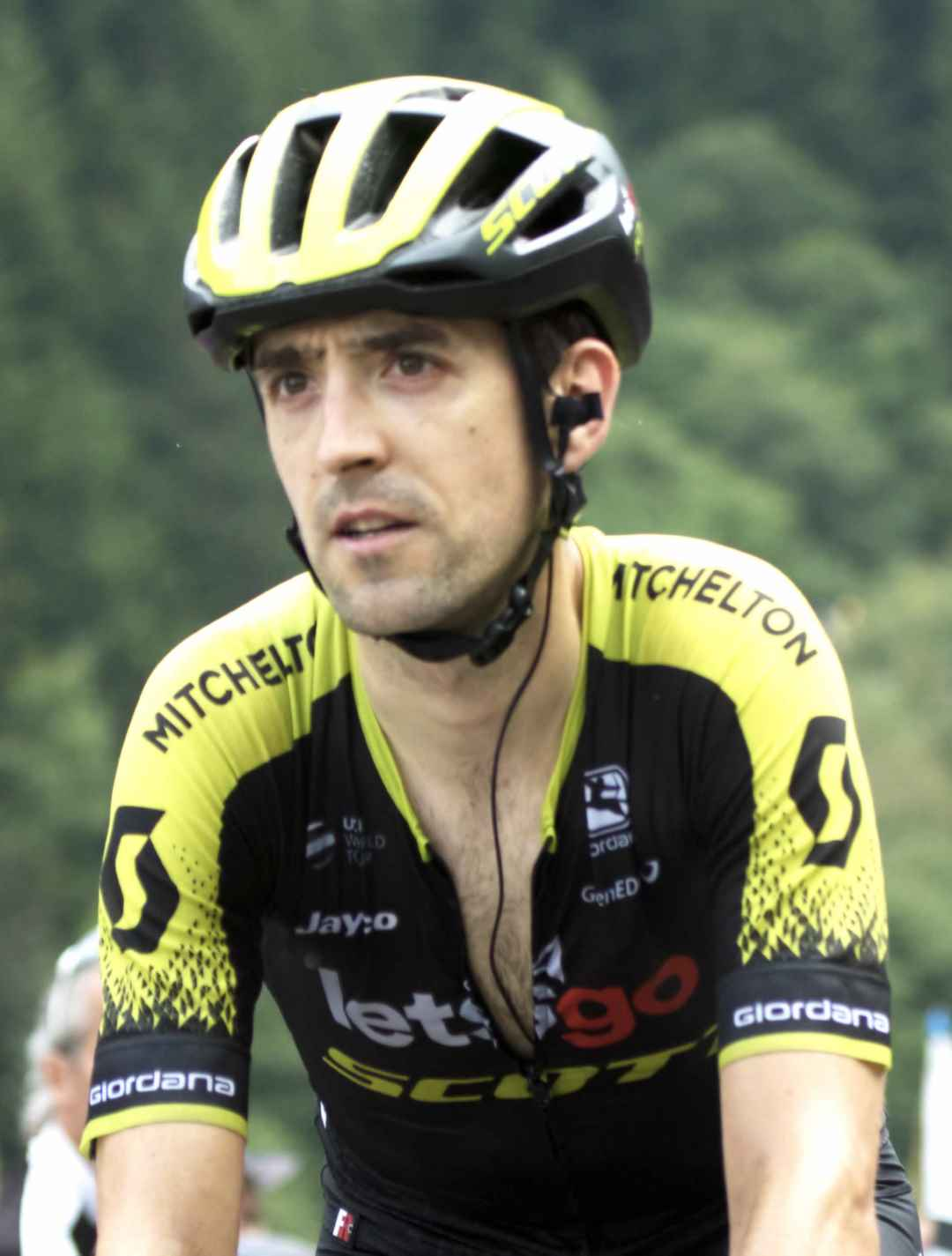
- Nieve at the 2018 Tour de France.

Personal information
- Full name: Mikel Nieve Iturralde
- Nickname: Frosty
- Born: 26 May 1984 (age 42) Leitza, Spain
- Height: 1.73 m (5 ft 8 in)
- Weight: 62 kg (137 lb; 9 st 11 lb)

Cycling career
- Sport: Cycling
- Discipline: Road
- Role: Rider
- Rider type: Climber

Amateur teams
- 2003: Café Baqué–Labarca 2 amateur
- 2004–2007: Caja Rural amateur

Professional teams
- 2008: Orbea–Oreka SDA
- 2009–2013: Euskaltel–Euskadi
- 2014–2017: Team Sky
- 2018–2021: Mitchelton–Scott
- 2022: Caja Rural–Seguros RGA

Major wins
- Grand Tours Giro d'Italia Mountains classification (2016) 3 individual stages (2011, 2016, 2018) Vuelta a España 1 individual stage (2010)

Mikel Nieve Iturralde (born 26 May 1984) is a Spanish Basque former professional road bicycle racer, who competed as a professional from 2008 to 2022.

== Career ==
=== Euskaltel–Euskadi (2009–2013) ===
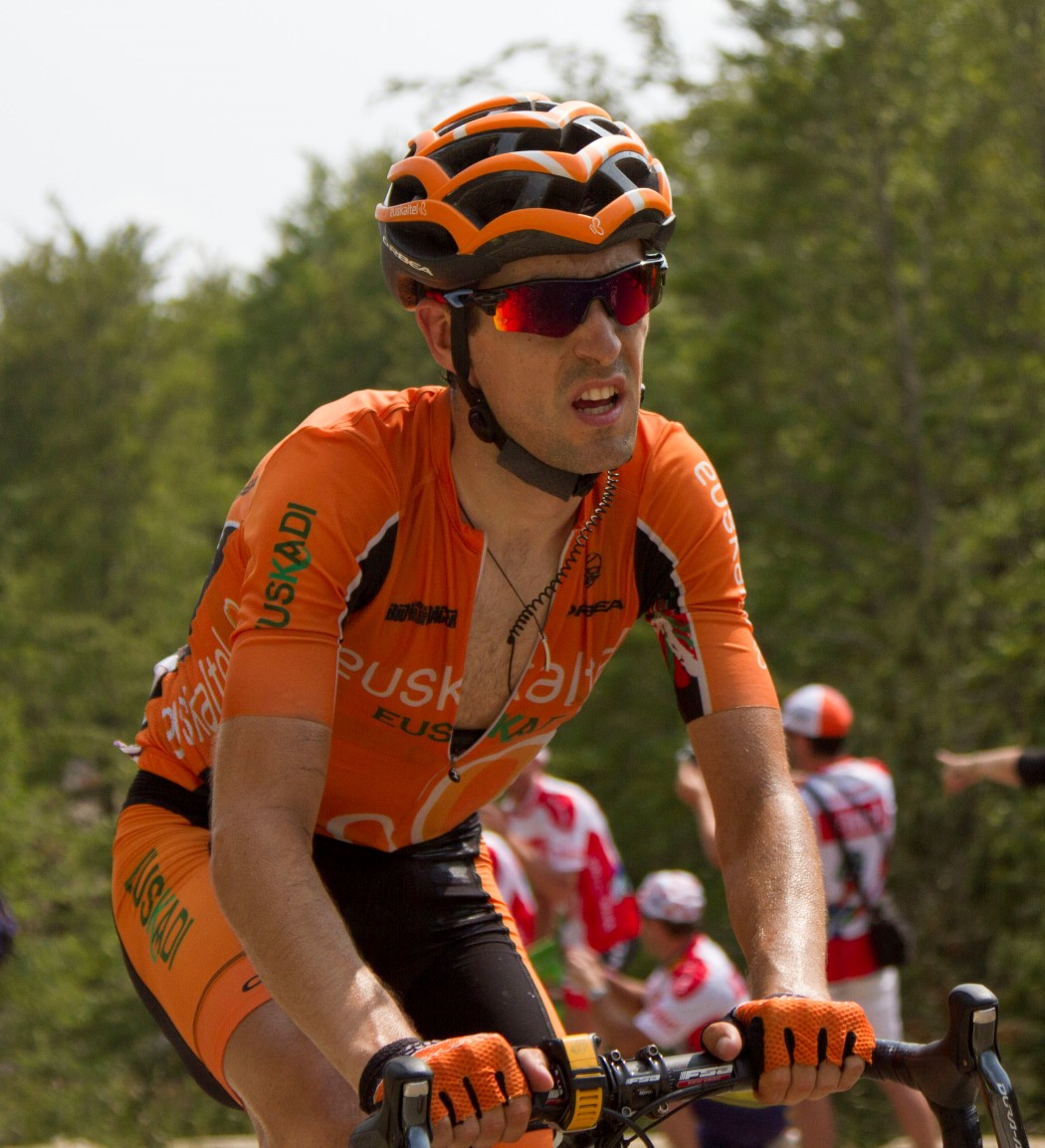
Nieve at the 2013 Tour de France

Born in Leitza, Nieve won the sixteenth stage of the 2010 Vuelta a España, shaking off four riders to win solo in the mountain finish at the Alto de Cotobello. He earned another prestigious victory in the fifteenth stage of the 2011 Giro d'Italia, the queen stage of that year's edition, which Alberto Contador later described as the most difficult stage of his life. Nieve had broken away early, and crested the penultimate climb of the day, the Passo Fedaia, with only Stefano Garzelli in front of him. On the lower slope of the final climb to Gardeccia-Val di Fassa, Nieve passed Garzelli, and held on to win the stage after having spent a little less than 7 hours and a half in the saddle.

He finished 10th twice in the Giro d'Italia in 2011 and 2012. He also finished 10th twice in the Vuelta a España in 2010 and 2011.

In 2013, Nieve rode his first Tour de France, where he finished 3rd on Mont Ventoux and 9th on Alpe d'Huez. He ended up finishing 12th overall. After the disbanding of the Euskaltel–Euskadi team was confirmed at the end of the 2013 season, Nieve agreed to join Team Sky on an initial two-year deal.

=== Team Sky (2014–2017) ===
In 2014, he won stage 8, the final stage of the Critérium du Dauphiné as well as finishing 8th overall.

In 2015, Nieve finished 8th overall in the Vuelta a España, his highest Grand Tour finish to date.

In 2016, Nieve won stage 13 of the Giro d'Italia. He also went on to win the mountains classification. Nieve also rode the Tour de France, where he helped Chris Froome take overall victory as one of his mountain domestiques.

=== Mitchelton–Scott (2018–2021) ===
In August 2017, it was announced that Nieve would join Mitchelton–Scott for the 2018 season. During the 2018 Giro d'Italia, Nieve won the penultimate stage of the race, having been a part of the 27-rider breakaway on his 34th birthday. He finished 10th overall in the 2019 Vuelta a España, finishing in the top 10 of the race for the fourth time in his career, having entered the race as a domestique for teammate Esteban Chaves. At the 2020 Tour de France, he abandoned a Grand Tour for the first time in 19 attempts, having finished each of the previous 18 in the top-25 placings overall. He then rode the 2020 Vuelta a España, and finished 13th overall.

=== Caja Rural–Seguros RGA ===
In December 2021, Nieve announced that he was joining the Caja Rural–Seguros RGA team for the 2022 season, after thirteen years at UCI World Tour level.

== Major results ==
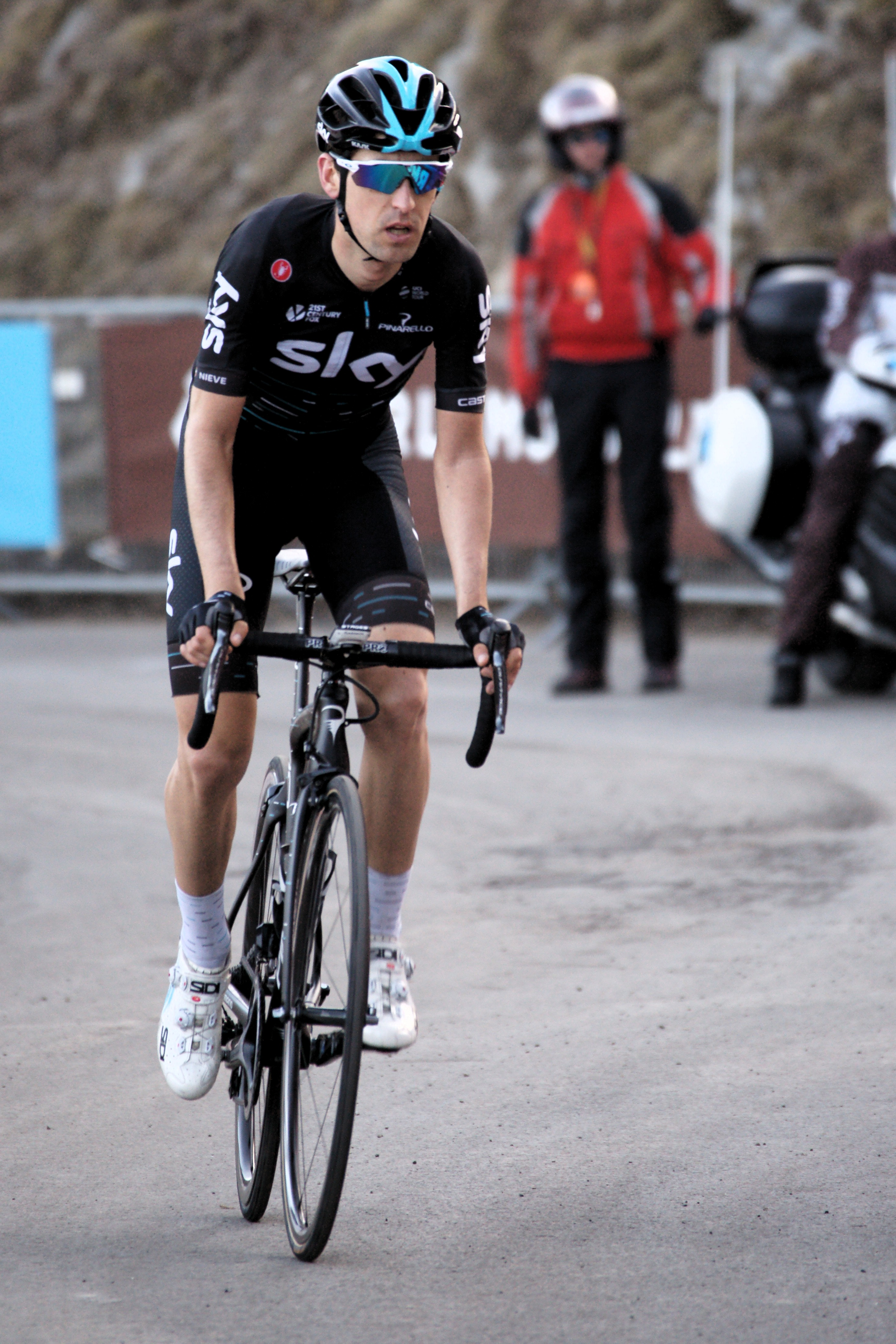
Nieve at the 2017 Paris–Nice

2007
9th Overall Vuelta a Navarra
2008
3rd Overall Cinturó de l'Empordà
2009
7th Overall Vuelta a Mallorca

7th Trofeo Inca

2010
4th Trofeo Inca
7th Giro di Lombardia
10th Overall Vuelta a España

1st Stage 16

2011
8th Gran Premio de Llodio
10th Overall Giro d'Italia

1st Stage 15

10th Overall Vuelta a España
10th Overall Vuelta a Burgos
2012
5th Overall Tour de Suisse
10th Overall Giro d'Italia
2013
4th Clásica de San Sebastián
2014
4th Clásica de San Sebastián
8th Overall Critérium du Dauphiné

1st Stage 8

10th Overall Tirreno–Adriatico
Combativity award Stage 18 Tour de France
2015
2nd Overall Tour of Slovenia
4th Overall Vuelta a Andalucía
6th Giro di Lombardia
8th Overall Vuelta a España
10th Overall Tour de Pologne
2016
Giro d'Italia

1st Mountains classification
1st Stage 13

10th Overall Vuelta a Andalucía
2017
8th Giro di Lombardia
9th Overall Tour de Suisse
2018
1st Stage 20 Giro d'Italia
2019
4th GP Miguel Induráin
8th Overall Tour of the Basque Country
10th Overall Vuelta a España
2020
9th Overall Tour de Pologne
10th Overall Vuelta a Burgos
2022
10th Overall Troféu Joaquim Agostinho

=== General classification results timeline ===
Grand Tour general classification results
Grand Tour	2009	2010	2011	2012	2013	2014	2015	2016	2017	2018	2019	2020	2021	2022
Giro d'Italia	—	—	10	10	—	—	17	25	—	17	17	—	25	—
Tour de France	—	—	—	—	12	18	—	17	14	23	—	DNF	—	—
Vuelta a España	—	10	10	—	23	12	8	—	16	—	10	13	31	—
Major stage race general classification results
Race	2009	2010	2011	2012	2013	2014	2015	2016	2017	2018	2019	2020	2021	2022
Paris–Nice	—	DNF	—	—	85	—	—	28	25	—	56	—	—	—
Tirreno–Adriatico	—	—	—	—	—	10	17	—	—	—	—	—	—	—
Volta a Catalunya	—	—	26	DNF	13	DNF	—	12	53	—	—	NH	—	DNF
Tour of the Basque Country	DNF	—	—	—	—	24	45	—	29	—	8	NH	49	DNF
Tour de Romandie	—	41	—	—	—	52	—	DNF	—	16	—	NH	—	—
Critérium du Dauphiné	42	—	—	—	17	8	—	—	—	—	—	—	—	—
Tour de Suisse	—	—	—	5	—	—	—	—	9	—	—	NH	—	—
