= James Knox (cyclist) =

British cyclist (born 1995)

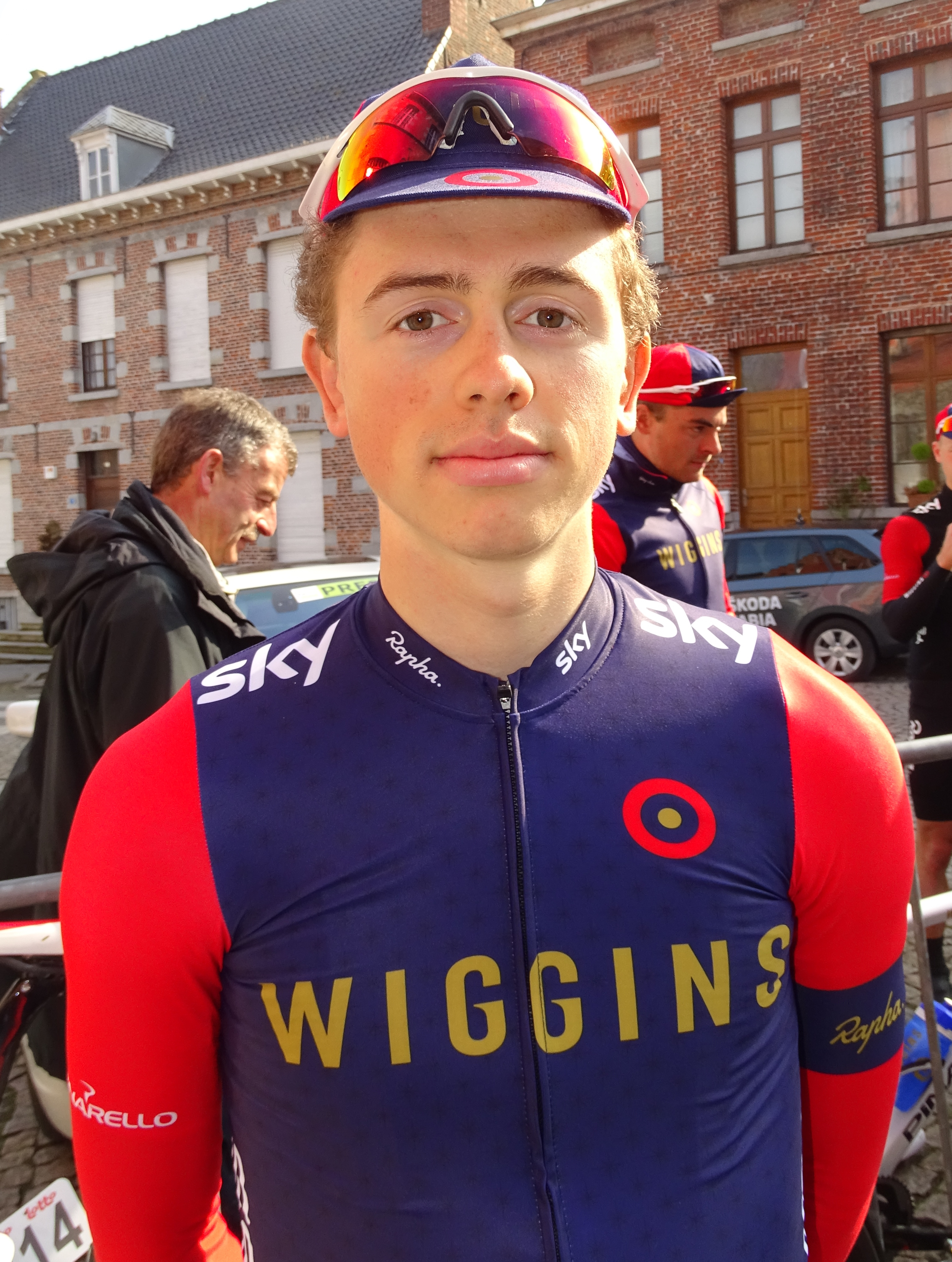
- Knox, as a WIGGINS rider in 2016.

Personal information
- Full name: James Alexander Knox
- Nickname: Knoxy
- Born: 4 November 1995 (age 30) Levens, Cumbria, England
- Height: 173 cm (5 ft 8 in)
- Weight: 58 kg (128 lb)

Cycling career
- Sport: Cycling
- Current team: Team Picnic–PostNL
- Discipline: Road
- Role: Rider
- Rider type: Climber

Amateur team
- 2014–2015: Zappi

Professional teams
- 2016–2017: WIGGINS
- 2018–2025: Quick-Step Floors
- 2026: Team Picnic PostNL

James Alexander Knox (born 4 November 1995) is a British road racing cyclist, who currently rides for UCI WorldTeam Team Picnic Post NL.

== Career ==
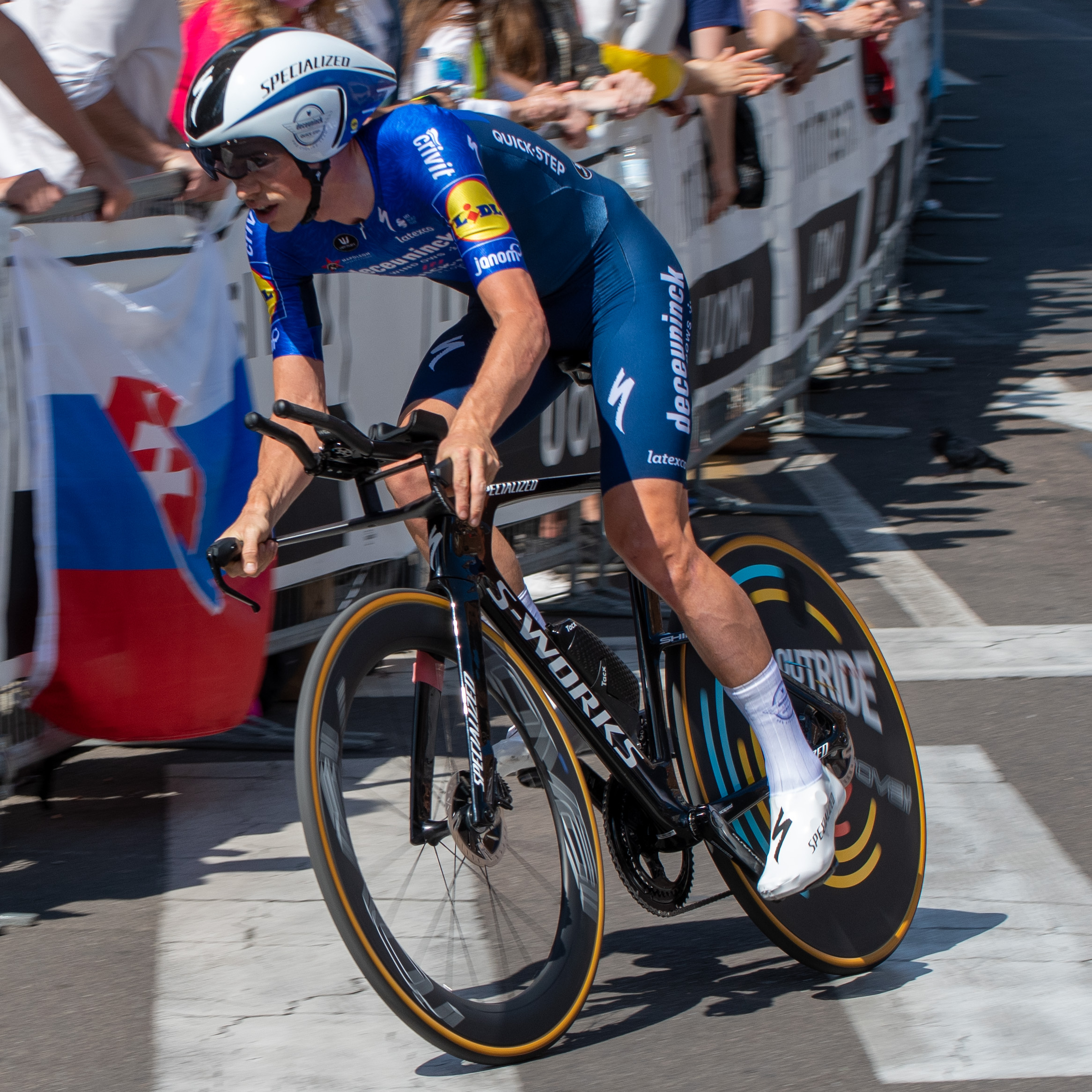
Knox at the 2021 Giro d'Italia

In 2017, Knox came second in the under-23 version of Liège–Bastogne–Liège. In September of that year Quick-Step Floors announced that Knox would turn professional with the team for the 2018 season.

In May 2019, he was named in the startlist for the 2019 Giro d'Italia. In August 2019, he was named in the startlist for the 2019 Vuelta a España. He was in the general classification Top 10 with two stages to go, however he lost 11 minutes on the penultimate stage after crashing the day before, eventually finishing in 11th place.

== Major results ==
2012
8th Overall Junior Tour of Wales

1st Stage 4

2013
3rd Overall Junior Tour of Wales

1st Mountains classification
1st Stages 1 & 4

2014
9th Piccolo Giro dell'Emilia
2015
8th Trofeo PIVA
9th Clássica Loulé
2016
4th Overall Ronde de l'Isard
6th Overall Course de la Paix U23
2017
2nd Liège–Bastogne–Liège U23
5th Overall Ronde de l'Isard
6th Overall Tour Alsace
8th Overall Tour of Croatia
8th Overall Tour de l'Avenir
8th Overall Giro della Valle d'Aosta
2018
1st Stage 1 (TTT) Adriatica Ionica Race
6th Overall Tour de Wallonie
2019
3rd Overall Adriatica Ionica Race
8th Overall UAE Tour
10th Overall Tour de Pologne
2020
1st Stage 1b (TTT) Settimana Internazionale di Coppi e Bartali
7th Overall Tirreno–Adriatico
2021
7th Trofeo Laigueglia
2022
6th Overall Deutschland Tour
2023
2nd Road race, National Road Championships
8th Overall Tour of the Basque Country

=== General classification results timeline ===
Grand Tour general classification results
Grand Tour	2018	2019	2020	2021	2022	2023	2024	2025
Giro d'Italia	—	DNF	14	53	81	—	—	19
Tour de France	—	—	—	—	—	—	—	—
Vuelta a España	—	11	—	100	—	65	67	—
Major stage race general classification results
Race	2018	2019	2020	2021	2022	2023	2024	2025
Paris–Nice	—	—	—	—	—	—	—	—
Tirreno–Adriatico	—	—	7	—	—	—	—	—
Volta a Catalunya	78	25	NH	34	—	—	59	50
Tour of the Basque Country	DNF	—	NH	14	DNF	8	DNF	69
Tour de Romandie	DNF	14	NH	—	71	DNF	—	—
Critérium du Dauphiné	79	—	76	—	—	—	77	—
Tour de Suisse	—	—	NH	—	73	70	—	DNF
