= Nicolas Edet =

French road cyclist

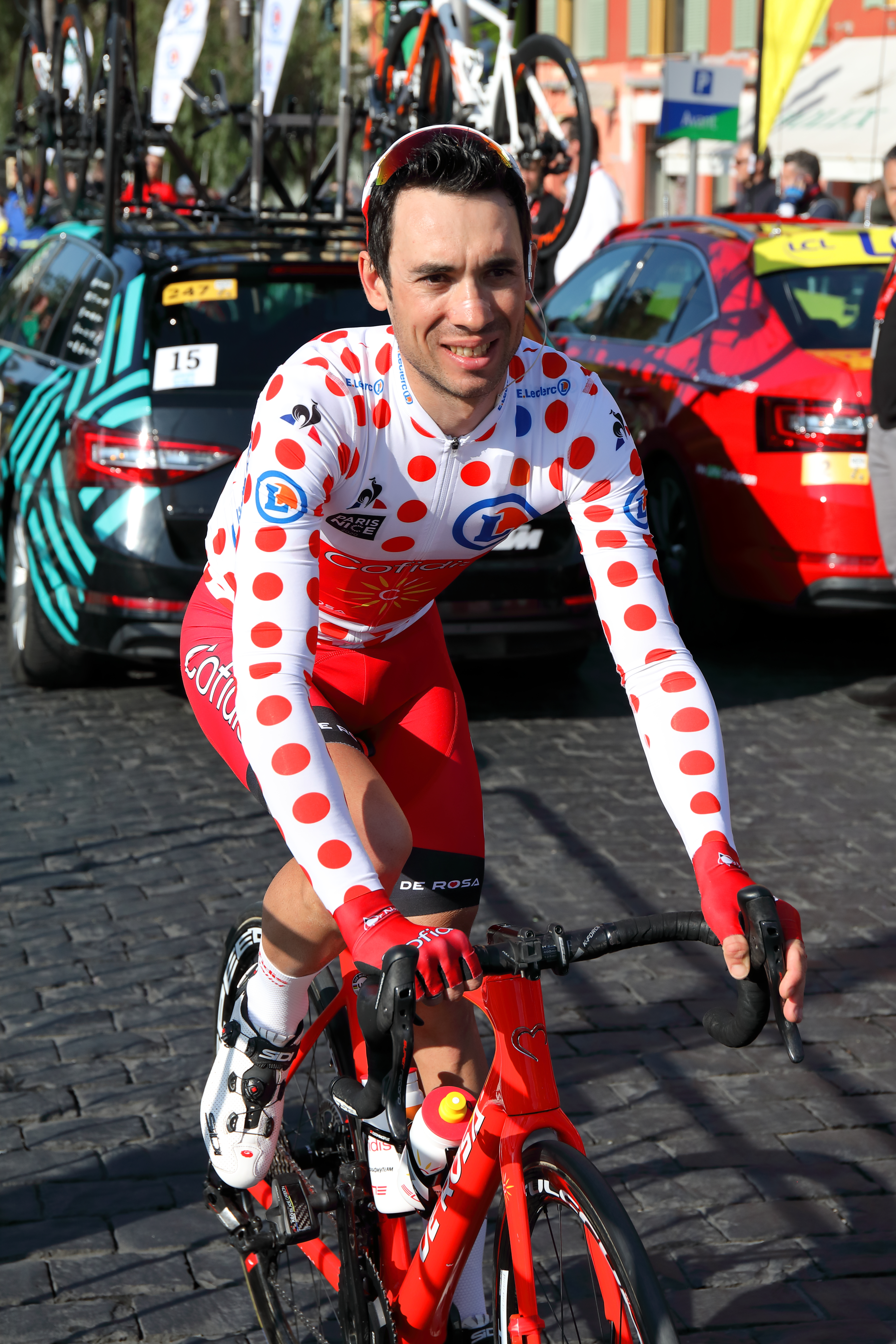
- Edet in 2020

Personal information
- Full name: Nicolas Edet
- Born: 2 December 1987 (age 38) La Ferté-Bernard, France
- Height: 1.76 m (5 ft 9 1/2 in)
- Weight: 60 kg (132 lb; 9 st 6 lb)

Cycling career
- Sport: Cycling
- Discipline: Road
- Role: Rider
- Rider type: Climber

Amateur teams
- 2007: Centre
- 2008: Pays de la Loire
- 2008–2010: Team Agem 72
- 2010: Cofidis (stagiaire)

Professional teams
- 2011–2021: Cofidis
- 2022–2023: Arkéa–Samsic

Major wins
- Grand Tours Vuelta a España Mountains classification (2013)

Nicolas Edet (French: [nikɔla edɛ]; born 2 December 1987) is a French professional road cyclist, who last rode for UCI WorldTeam Arkéa–Samsic. He has entered the Tour de France on eight occasions and completed the race seven times. He won the mountains classification in the 2013 Vuelta a España, and wore the red jersey of overall race leader, for one day, during the 2019 Vuelta a España.

== Major results ==
2007
8th Overall Tour du Faso

1st Stage 4

2008
4th Paris–Tours Espoirs
2009
4th Overall Rhône-Alpes Isère Tour
10th Overall Giro della Valle d'Aosta
2010
1st Stage 5 Giro della Valle d'Aosta
3rd Overall Tour des Pays de Savoie

1st Stage 4

3rd Overall Tour Alsace
2011
1st Mountains classification, Tour of Austria
10th Overall Tour of Turkey
2012
9th Overall Tour du Gévaudan Languedoc-Roussillon
Combativity award Stage 1 Tour de France
2013
Vuelta a España

1st Mountains classification
Combativity award Stage 4

1st Mountains classification, Rhône-Alpes Isère Tour
4th Overall Tour of Turkey
8th Prueba Villafranca de Ordizia
9th Overall Tour of Austria
2014
5th Overall Rhône-Alpes Isère Tour

1st Stage 3

7th Grand Prix de la Ville de Lillers
2015
1st Mountains classification, Tour de Yorkshire
6th Overall Tour du Limousin
7th Overall Vuelta a Andalucía
7th Overall Critérium International
7th Cholet-Pays de Loire
2016
1st Sprints classification, Tour of the Basque Country
3rd Overall Route du Sud
4th Overall Tour du Limousin
5th Tour du Doubs
5th Grand Prix de Wallonie
10th Overall Tour de Luxembourg
2017
3rd Overall Tour du Gévaudan Languedoc-Roussillon

1st Mountains classification

4th Tour du Doubs
5th Overall Tour La Provence
9th Overall Tour de Luxembourg
2018
1st Overall Tour du Limousin

1st Stage 3

2nd Overall Tour de l'Ain
4th Tour du Finistère
2019
5th Overall Tour du Haut Var
10th Overall Tour de l'Ain
10th Classic Sud-Ardèche
Vuelta a España

Held after Stage 8

2020
1st Mountains classification, Paris–Nice
5th Overall Tour des Alpes-Maritimes et du Var
5th Ardèche Classic
2022
3rd Overall Vuelta a Asturias
4th Overall Tour of Turkey
9th Overall Route d'Occitanie

=== Grand Tour general classification results timeline ===
| Grand Tour | 2011 | 2012 | 2013 | 2014 | 2015 | 2016 | 2017 | 2018 | 2019 | 2020 | 2021 |
|---|---|---|---|---|---|---|---|---|---|---|---|
| Giro d'Italia | — | — | — | — | — | — | — | — | — | DNF | DNF |
| Tour de France | — | 128 | — | 77 | 111 | 106 | 76 | 43 | DNF | 49 | — |
| Vuelta a España | DNF | — | 104 | — | — | — | — | — | 18 | — | — |

Legend
| — | Did not compete |
| DNF | Did not finish |
