= Carl Fredrik Hagen =

Norwegian cyclist

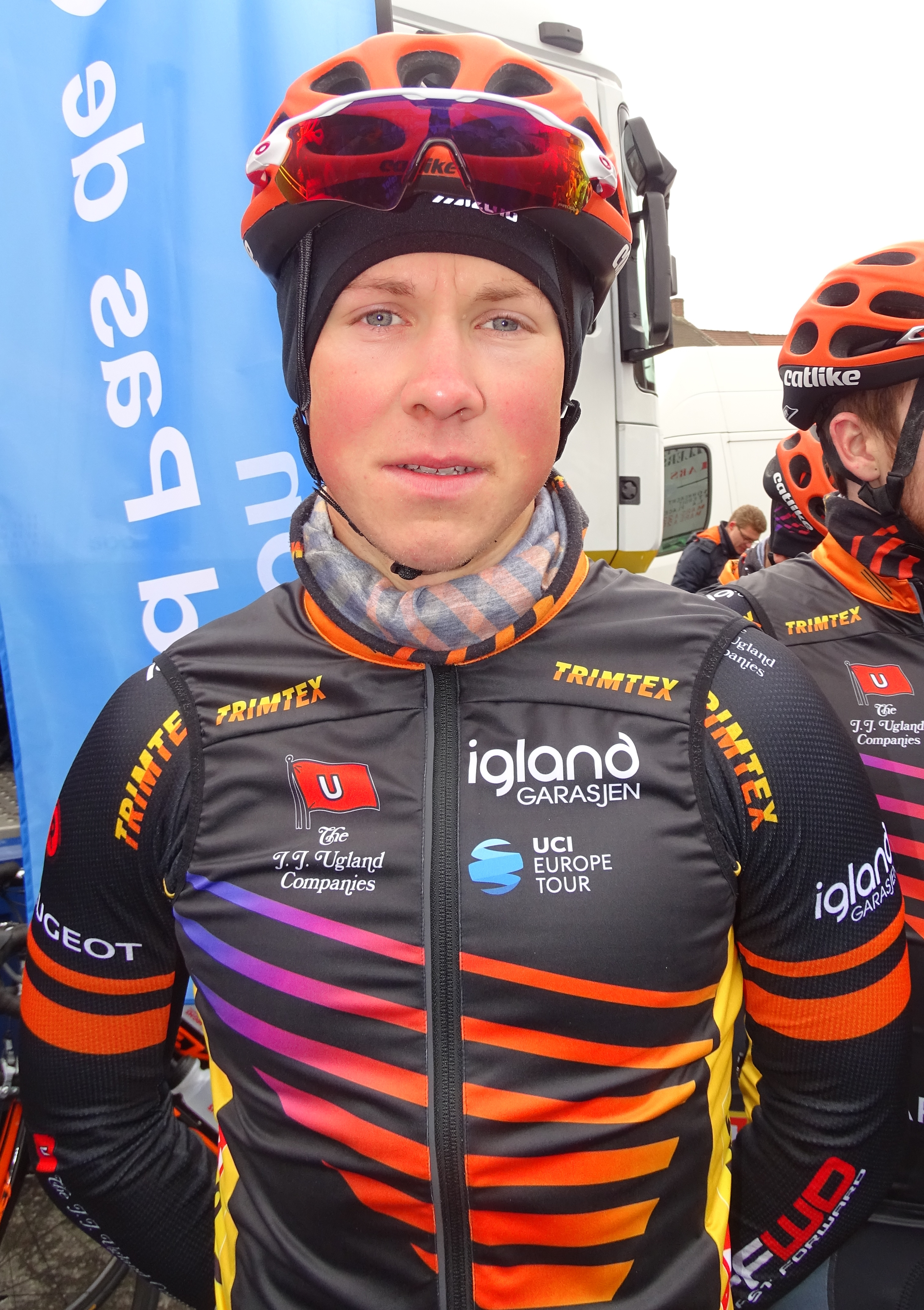
- Hagen in 2016.

Personal information
- Full name: Carl Fredrik Hagen
- Born: 26 September 1991 (age 35) Oppegård, Norway
- Height: 1.8 m (5 ft 11 in)
- Weight: 65 kg (143 lb)

Cycling career
- Sport: Cycling
- Current team: Retired
- Discipline: Road
- Role: Rider

Amateur team
- 2007–2014: Oslo Sportslager

Professional teams
- 2015–2016: Team Sparebanken Sør
- 2017–2018: Joker Icopal
- 2019–2020: Lotto–Soudal
- 2021–2022: Israel Start-Up Nation
- 2023–2024: Q36.5 Pro Cycling Team

Carl Fredrik Hagen (born 26 September 1991) is a Norwegian former cyclist, who competed as a professional from 2015 to 2024.

== Career ==
Hagen was born in Oppegård. In August 2019, he was named in the startlist for the Vuelta a España. At the age of 27 this was his first entrance into a Grand Tour, and he rode exceedingly well. While he was not able to answer every attack made by the elite general classification riders, he did answer the majority of them and as a result he surpassed all expectations earning a top 10 finish coming in almost three minutes behind Wilco Kelderman who finished seventh, and nearly ten minutes ahead of Marc Soler who finished 9th.

In August 2020, it was announced that Hagen was to join Israel Start-Up Nation from the 2021 season, on a two-year contract. In October 2020, he was named in the startlist for the 2020 Giro d'Italia.

== Major results ==
2015
4th Overall East Bohemia Tour
2016
1st Mountains classification, Tour des Fjords
1st Mountains classification, Tour de Bretagne
1st Mountains classification, East Bohemia Tour
2nd Sundvolden GP
2017
1st Mountains classification, Ronde de l'Oise
2nd Sundvolden GP
2nd Ringerike GP
2nd Overall Tour Alsace

1st Stage 4

8th Overall Arctic Race of Norway
2018
1st Overall Tour du Jura
2nd Sundvolden GP
4th Overall Tour of Norway
6th Ringerike GP
8th Overall Arctic Race of Norway
9th Tour du Finistère
2019
3rd Road race, National Road Championships
7th Overall Tour of Guangxi
8th Overall Vuelta a España
10th Overall Tour of Norway
2020
3rd Road race, National Road Championships
2021
10th Overall CRO Race
2022
5th Overall Tour de Hongrie
5th Road race, National Road Championships
9th Overall Arctic Race of Norway
10th Overall Tour of Norway
2024
9th Overall Tour of Turkey
10th Overall Tour of Norway

=== Grand Tour general classification results timeline ===
Grand Tour	2019	2020	2021	2022
Giro d'Italia	—	42	—	—
Tour de France	—	—	—	—
Vuelta a España	8	—	—	34

Legend
—	Did not compete
DNF	Did not finish
