= 2020 Trek–Segafredo (men's team) season =

Trek–Segafredo
- 2020 season
- UCI code: TFS
- Status: UCI WorldTeam
- Manager: Luca Guercilena
- Main sponsor(s): Trek
- Based: United States
- Bicycles: Trek
- Groupset: Sram

Season victories
- One-day races: 4
- Stage race overall: 1
- Stage race stages: 4
- Most wins: Mads Pedersen (4)
- Jersey

The 2020 cycling season for Trek–Segafredo began in January at the Tour Down Under in Australia.

Among Trek–Segafredo's ranks this season are multiple Grand Tour winner Vincenzo Nibali of Italy and two defending world champions in world road race champion Mads Pedersen of Denmark and junior road race champion Quinn Simmons of the United States.

== Roster ==
As of 5 June 2020.

Rider	Date of birth
Julien Bernard (FRA)	17 March 1992 (aged 27)
Gianluca Brambilla (ITA)	22 August 1987 (aged 32)
Giulio Ciccone (ITA)	20 December 1994 (aged 25)
Will Clarke (AUS)	11 April 1985 (aged 34)
Nicola Conci (ITA)	5 January 1997 (aged 22)
Koen de Kort (NED)	8 September 1982 (aged 37)
Niklas Eg (DEN)	6 January 1995 (aged 24)
Kenny Elissonde (FRA)	21 July 1991 (aged 28)
Alexander Kamp (DEN)	14 December 1993 (aged 26)
Alex Kirsch (LUX)	12 June 1992 (aged 27)
Emīls Liepiņš (LAT)	29 October 1992 (aged 27)
Juan Pedro López (ESP)	31 July 1997 (aged 22)
Bauke Mollema (NED)	26 November 1986 (aged 33)
Jacopo Mosca (ITA)	29 August 1993 (aged 26)

Rider	Date of birth
Matteo Moschetti (ITA)	14 August 1996 (aged 23)
Ryan Mullen (IRE)	7 August 1994 (aged 25)
Antonio Nibali (ITA)	23 September 1992 (aged 27)
Vincenzo Nibali (ITA)	14 November 1984 (aged 35)
Mads Pedersen (DEN)	18 December 1995 (aged 24)
Richie Porte (AUS)	30 January 1985 (aged 34)
Charlie Quarterman (GBR)	6 September 1998 (aged 21)
Kiel Reijnen (USA)	1 June 1986 (aged 33)
Michel Ries (LUX)	11 March 1998 (aged 21)
Quinn Simmons (USA)	8 May 2001 (aged 18)
Toms Skujiņš (LAT)	15 June 1991 (aged 28)
Jasper Stuyven (BEL)	17 April 1992 (aged 27)
Edward Theuns (BEL)	30 April 1991 (aged 28)
Pieter Weening (Note: Weening joined the team on 5 June.) (NED)	5 April 1981 (aged 38)

Riders who joined the team for the 2020 season

Rider	2019 team
Kenny Elissonde	Team INEOS
Alexander Kamp	Riwal Readynez
Emīls Liepiņš	Wallonie Bruxelles
Juan Pedro López	neo-pro (Kometa Cycling Team)
Antonio Nibali	Bahrain–Merida
Vincenzo Nibali	Bahrain–Merida
Charlie Quarterman	neo-pro (Holdsworth–Zappi)
Michel Ries	neo-pro (Kometa Cycling Team)
Quinn Simmons	neo-pro (Lux–Strading p/b Specialized)
Pieter Weening	Roompot–Charles

Riders who left the team during or after the 2019 season

Rider	2020 team
Fumiyuki Beppu	Nippo–Delko–One Provence
John Degenkolb	Lotto–Soudal
Fabio Felline	Astana
Alex Frame	
Michael Gogl	NTT Pro Cycling
Markel Irizar	Retired
Jarlinson Pantano	Retired
Peter Stetina	Retired (gravel and endurance mountain biking)

== Season victories ==
Date	Race	Competition	Rider	Country	Location
22 January	Tour Down Under, Stage 3	UCI World Tour	Richie Porte (AUS)	Australia	Paracombe
25 January	Tour Down Under, Overall	UCI World Tour	Richie Porte (AUS)	Australia	
30 January	Trofeo Felanitx, Ses Salines, Campos, Porreres	UCI Europe Tour	Matteo Moschetti (ITA)	Spain	Felanitx
2 February	Trofeo Playa de Palma-Palma	UCI Europe Tour	Matteo Moschetti (ITA)	Spain	Palma
23 February	Tour du Haut Var, Stage 3	UCI Europe Tour	Julien Bernard (FRA)	France	Mont Faron
23 February	Tour du Haut Var, Mountains classification	UCI Europe Tour	Julien Bernard (FRA)	France	
23 February	Tour du Haut Var, Teams classification	UCI Europe Tour	(Note: The riders in the squad were Julien Bernard, Kenny Elissonde, Alex Kirsch, Juan Pedro López, Richie Porte, Michel Ries and Toms Skujiņš.)	France	
29 February	Omloop Het Nieuwsblad	UCI World Tour	Jasper Stuyven (BEL)	Belgium	Ninove
4 August	Route d'Occitanie, Teams classification	UCI Europe Tour	(Note: The riders in the squad were Julien Bernard, Will Clarke, Niklas Eg, Kenny Elissonde, Bauke Mollema, Richie Porte, and Michel Ries.)	France	
6 August	Tour de Pologne, Stage 2	UCI World Tour	Mads Pedersen (DEN)	Poland	Zabrze
9 August	Tour de l'Ain, Mountains classification	UCI Europe Tour	Julien Bernard (FRA)	France	
1 October	BinckBank Tour, Stage 3	UCI World Tour	Mads Pedersen (DEN)	Belgium	Aalter
3 October	BinckBank Tour, Points classification	UCI World Tour	Mads Pedersen (DEN)	Belgium	
11 October	Gent–Wevelgem	UCI World Tour	Mads Pedersen (DEN)	Belgium	Wevelgem

== National, Continental and World Champions ==
Date	Discipline	Jersey	Rider	Country	Location
