= 2017 Tirreno–Adriatico =

Cycling race

2017 UCI World Tour, race 7 of 37

Race details
- Dates: 8–14 March 2017
- Stages: 7
- Distance: 1,030.7 km (640.4 mi)
- Winning time: 25h 56' 27"

Results
Jersey awarded to the overall winner	Winner	Nairo Quintana (COL)	(Movistar Team)
	Second	Rohan Dennis (AUS)	(BMC Racing Team)
	Third	Thibaut Pinot (FRA)	(FDJ)
Jersey awarded to the points classification winner	Points	Peter Sagan (SVK)	(Bora–Hansgrohe)
Jersey awarded to the mountains classification winner	Mountains	Davide Ballerini (ITA)	(Androni–Sidermec–Bottecchia)
Jersey awarded to the youth classification winner	Youth	Bob Jungels (LUX)	(Quick-Step Floors)
	Team	Movistar Team	

The 2017 Tirreno–Adriatico was a road cycling stage race that took place between 8 and 14 March. It was the 52nd edition of the Tirreno–Adriatico and was the seventh event of the 2017 UCI World Tour.

The race was won for the second time in three years by Colombian rider Nairo Quintana, riding for the Movistar Team. Quintana took the race lead after winning the queen stage of the race to Monte Terminillo, and maintained it to the end of the race, ultimately winning by 25 seconds over BMC Racing Team rider Rohan Dennis, who won the final individual time trial stage as well as being part of the opening stage-winning team time trial. The podium was completed by FDJ's Thibaut Pinot, a further 11 seconds in arrears of Dennis.

In the race's other classifications, Bora–Hansgrohe's Peter Sagan won the points classification after two stage victories, a second-place stage finish and a third place; Androni–Sidermec–Bottecchia rider Davide Ballerini won the mountains classification, while Bob Jungels (Quick-Step Floors) overtook Egan Bernal for the victory in the young rider classification, overhauling him in the final time trial. Quintana's Movistar Team won the teams classification with Jonathan Castroviejo also placing in the top ten overall.

== Teams ==
As Tirreno–Adriatico is a UCI World Tour event, all eighteen UCI WorldTeams were invited automatically and obliged to enter a team in the race. Four UCI Professional Continental teams competed, completing the 22-team peloton.

UCI WorldTeams

- AG2R La Mondiale
- Astana
- Bahrain–Merida
- BMC Racing Team
- Bora–Hansgrohe
- Cannondale–Drapac
- Team Dimension Data
- FDJ
- Team Katusha–Alpecin
- LottoNL–Jumbo
- Lotto–Soudal
- Movistar Team
- Orica–Scott
- Quick-Step Floors
- Team Sky
- Team Sunweb
- Trek–Segafredo
- UAE Team Emirates

UCI Professional Continental teams

- Bardiani–CSF
- Nippo–Vini Fantini
- Team Novo Nordisk
- Androni–Sidermec–Bottecchia

== Route ==
The route of the 2017 Tirreno–Adriatico was announced on 15 December 2016. The sixth stage, initially due to be held over 159 kilometres (99 miles) was extended to 168 kilometres (104 miles), as a result of sub-standard road conditions.

Stage schedule
Stage	Date	Route	Distance	Type	Winner
1	8 March	Lido di Camaiore to Lido di Camaiore	22.7 km (14 mi)	Team time trial	BMC Racing Team
2	9 March	Camaiore to Pomarance	229 km (142 mi)	Medium-mountain stage	Geraint Thomas (GBR)
3	10 March	Monterotondo Marittimo to Montalto di Castro	204 km (127 mi)	Hilly stage	Peter Sagan (SVK)
4	11 March	Montalto di Castro to Monte Terminillo	187 km (116 mi)	Mountain stage	Nairo Quintana (COL)
5	12 March	Rieti to Fermo	210 km (130 mi)	Medium-mountain stage	Peter Sagan (SVK)
6	13 March	Ascoli Piceno to Civitanova Marche	168 km (104 mi)	Hilly stage	Fernando Gaviria (COL)
7	14 March	San Benedetto del Tronto to San Benedetto del Tronto	10 km (6 mi)	Individual time trial	Rohan Dennis (AUS)

== Stages ==
=== Stage 1 ===
8 March 2017 — Lido di Camaiore to Lido di Camaiore, 22.7 km (14 mi), team time trial (TTT)

For the second year in succession, BMC Racing Team sealed victory on the opening day, as the American team recorded a time some 16 seconds faster than their closest rivals, Quick-Step Floors. Leading the team over the line was Italian rider Damiano Caruso, which enabled him to receive the first blue jersey for the general classification leader. The team's overall contenders Tejay van Garderen and Rohan Dennis were amongst the sextet at the finish, taking an early advantage over their rivals.

The team time trial was marred by a crash suffered by Team Sky rider Gianni Moscon, when his front wheel disintegrated at high speed. Moscon fell to the tarmac, suffering abrasions, but was able to remount. After the stage, Geraint Thomas stated to the media that two other team members suffered broken wheels during the stage; Team Sky ultimately finished 1 minute, 41 seconds down on the time of the BMC Racing Team.

Result of Stage 1
Rank	Team	Time
1	BMC Racing Team	23' 21"
2	Quick-Step Floors	+ 16"
3	FDJ	+ 21"
4	Movistar Team	+ 21"
5	Orica–Scott	+ 24"
6	LottoNL–Jumbo	+ 39"
7	Lotto–Soudal	+ 51"
8	Bahrain–Merida	+ 52"
9	Team Dimension Data	+ 52"
10	Astana	+ 54"

General classification after Stage 1
Rank	Rider	Team	Time
1	Damiano Caruso (ITA)	BMC Racing Team	23' 21"
2	Rohan Dennis (AUS)	BMC Racing Team	+ 0"
3	Greg Van Avermaet (BEL)	BMC Racing Team	+ 0"
4	Stefan Küng (SUI)	BMC Racing Team	+ 0"
5	Daniel Oss (ITA)	BMC Racing Team	+ 0"
6	Tejay van Garderen (USA)	BMC Racing Team	+ 0"
7	Tom Boonen (BEL)	Quick-Step Floors	+ 16"
8	Matteo Trentin (ITA)	Quick-Step Floors	+ 16"
9	Bob Jungels (LUX)	Quick-Step Floors	+ 16"
10	Julien Vermote (BEL)	Quick-Step Floors	+ 16"

=== Stage 2 ===
9 March 2017 — Camaiore to Pomarance, 229 km (142 mi)

The day's breakaway consisted of Davide Ballerini and Raffaello Bonusi from Androni–Sidermec–Bottecchia, Hugo Houle (AG2R La Mondiale), Nippo–Vini Fantini's Alan Marangoni, Mirco Maestri for Bardiani–CSF, and Charles Planet (Team Novo Nordisk). This sextet managed to gain around four minutes on the peloton, but after the climb to Volterra their advantage had been cut in half; with 41 km (25 mi) to go, a crash in the peloton took down several riders including Caleb Ewan (Orica–Scott) and Jurgen Van den Broeck (LottoNL–Jumbo). Ewan was later forced to abandon, and joined teammate Roger Kluge on the sidelines after he had abandoned earlier in the day.

With 27 km (17 mi) to go the leaders were in sight of the peloton with BMC Racing Team, Trek–Segafredo, Bora–Hansgrohe and Orica–Scott carrying out the tempo at the front of the group; this started a wave of counter-attacks from the main field, with attacks from Iuri Filosi (Nippo–Vini Fantini), and Team Sky pairing Gianni Moscon and Michał Kwiatkowski. Inside of 5.5 km (3 mi) remaining, Quick-Step Floors's Bob Jungels and Geraint Thomas (Team Sky) attacked on the 16% steep climb towards Pomarance, pulling Tim Wellens (Lotto–Soudal), and BMC Racing Team duo Tejay van Garderen and Damiano Caruso – in the leader's blue jersey – away with them. With Thomas pulling clear of Jungels, Nairo Quintana (Movistar Team) countered to the group of pursuers; Thomas was able to stay clear until the end, winning the stage by nine seconds from Tom Dumoulin of Team Sunweb.

Result of Stage 2
Rank	Rider	Team	Time
1	Geraint Thomas (GBR)	Team Sky	5h 51' 44"
2	Tom Dumoulin (NED)	Team Sunweb	+ 9"
3	Peter Sagan (SVK)	Bora–Hansgrohe	+ 9"
4	Greg Van Avermaet (BEL)	BMC Racing Team	+ 9"
5	Francesco Gavazzi (ITA)	Androni–Sidermec–Bottecchia	+ 9"
6	Michał Kwiatkowski (POL)	Team Sky	+ 9"
7	Adam Yates (GBR)	Orica–Scott	+ 9"
8	Rohan Dennis (AUS)	BMC Racing Team	+ 9"
9	Nairo Quintana (COL)	Movistar Team	+ 9"
10	Simon Clarke (AUS)	Cannondale–Drapac	+ 9"

General classification after Stage 2
Rank	Rider	Team	Time
1	Greg Van Avermaet (BEL)	BMC Racing Team	6h 15' 14"
2	Rohan Dennis (AUS)	BMC Racing Team	+ 0"
3	Tejay van Garderen (USA)	BMC Racing Team	+ 0"
4	Damiano Caruso (ITA)	BMC Racing Team	+ 0"
5	Niki Terpstra (NED)	Quick-Step Floors	+ 16"
6	Bob Jungels (LUX)	Quick-Step Floors	+ 16"
7	Nairo Quintana (COL)	Movistar Team	+ 21"
8	Daniel Moreno (ESP)	Movistar Team	+ 21"
9	Sébastien Reichenbach (SUI)	FDJ	+ 21"
10	Jonathan Castroviejo (ESP)	Movistar Team	+ 21"

=== Stage 3 ===
10 March 2017 — Monterotondo Marittimo to Montalto di Castro, 204 km (127 mi)

A group of riders that included Andriy Hrivko (Astana), Alexis Gougeard (AG2R La Mondiale), Mattia Frapporti (Androni–Sidermec–Bottecchia), Mirco Maestri and Luca Wackermann (Bardiani–CSF), Iuri Filosi and Kohei Uchima (Nippo–Vini Fantini) broke clear of the peloton in the early kilometres, with a gap of over three minutes ahead of the day's only categorised climb, at Scansano. Just as he had done the previous day, Maestri took maximum points at the pair of intermediate sprint points on the route, but the peloton was still pulling the breakaway back, and the field was as one again, with around 20 km (12 mi) remaining.

There was a crash in the final kilometres of the stage that took down Quick-Step Floors's main sprinter, Fernando Gaviria, and delaying numerous other riders as well – with the crash coming within the final 3 km (2 mi), all riders in the group were given the same time as the stage winner. At the finish, the world champion Peter Sagan (Bora–Hansgrohe) took his first victory of the season, edging out Elia Viviani (Team Sky) and Jürgen Roelandts (Lotto–Soudal) in a sprint to the line. With race leader Greg Van Avermaet (BMC Racing Team) among those that were delayed by the Gaviria crash, he ceded the race lead – for the third leader in as many days – to teammate Rohan Dennis.

Result of Stage 3
Rank	Rider	Team	Time
1	Peter Sagan (SVK)	Bora–Hansgrohe	4h 51' 59"
2	Elia Viviani (ITA)	Team Sky	+ 0"
3	Jürgen Roelandts (BEL)	Lotto–Soudal	+ 0"
4	Sacha Modolo (ITA)	UAE Team Emirates	+ 0"
5	Luka Mezgec (SLO)	Orica–Scott	+ 0"
6	Rick Zabel (GER)	Team Katusha–Alpecin	+ 0"
7	Andrea Palini (ITA)	Androni–Sidermec–Bottecchia	+ 0"
8	Roberto Ferrari (ITA)	UAE Team Emirates	+ 0"
9	Georg Preidler (AUT)	Team Sunweb	+ 0"
10	Ramon Sinkeldam (NED)	Team Sunweb	+ 0"

General classification after Stage 3
Rank	Rider	Team	Time
1	Rohan Dennis (AUS)	BMC Racing Team	11h 07' 13"
2	Greg Van Avermaet (BEL)	BMC Racing Team	+ 0"
3	Damiano Caruso (ITA)	BMC Racing Team	+ 0"
4	Tejay van Garderen (USA)	BMC Racing Team	+ 0"
5	Niki Terpstra (NED)	Quick-Step Floors	+ 16"
6	Bob Jungels (LUX)	Quick-Step Floors	+ 16"
7	Nairo Quintana (COL)	Movistar Team	+ 21"
8	Andrey Amador (CRC)	Movistar Team	+ 21"
9	Jonathan Castroviejo (ESP)	Movistar Team	+ 21"
10	Daniel Moreno (ESP)	Movistar Team	+ 21"

=== Stage 4 ===
11 March 2017 — Montalto di Castro to Monte Terminillo, 187 km (116 mi)

Result of Stage 4
Rank	Rider	Team	Time
1	Nairo Quintana (COL)	Movistar Team	5h 27' 22"
2	Geraint Thomas (GBR)	Team Sky	+ 18"
3	Adam Yates (GBR)	Orica–Scott	+ 24"
4	Rigoberto Urán (COL)	Cannondale–Drapac	+ 24"
5	Simon Špilak (SLO)	Team Katusha–Alpecin	+ 29"
6	Tom Dumoulin (NED)	Team Sunweb	+ 41"
7	Domenico Pozzovivo (ITA)	AG2R La Mondiale	+ 41"
8	Mikel Landa (ESP)	Team Sky	+ 41"
9	Thibaut Pinot (FRA)	FDJ	+ 46"
10	Primož Roglič (SLO)	LottoNL–Jumbo	+ 51"

General classification after Stage 4
Rank	Rider	Team	Time
1	Nairo Quintana (COL)	Movistar Team	16h 34' 46"
2	Adam Yates (GBR)	Orica–Scott	+ 33"
3	Thibaut Pinot (FRA)	FDJ	+ 56"
4	Jonathan Castroviejo (ESP)	Movistar Team	+ 1' 01"
5	Rohan Dennis (AUS)	BMC Racing Team	+ 1' 06"
6	Tom Dumoulin (NED)	Team Sunweb	+ 1' 19"
7	Primož Roglič (SLO)	LottoNL–Jumbo	+ 1' 19"
8	Geraint Thomas (GBR)	Team Sky	+ 1' 23"
9	Daniel Moreno (ESP)	Movistar Team	+ 1' 27"
10	Domenico Pozzovivo (ITA)	AG2R La Mondiale	+ 1' 29"

=== Stage 5 ===
12 March 2017 — Rieti to Fermo, 210 km (130 mi)

Result of Stage 5
Rank	Rider	Team	Time
1	Peter Sagan (SVK)	Bora–Hansgrohe	5h 00' 05"
2	Thibaut Pinot (FRA)	FDJ	+ 0"
3	Primož Roglič (SLO)	LottoNL–Jumbo	+ 0"
4	Geraint Thomas (GBR)	Team Sky	+ 0"
5	Bauke Mollema (NED)	Trek–Segafredo	+ 0"
6	Rigoberto Urán (COL)	Cannondale–Drapac	+ 0"
7	Tom Dumoulin (NED)	Team Sunweb	+ 0"
8	Nairo Quintana (COL)	Movistar Team	+ 0"
9	Rohan Dennis (AUS)	BMC Racing Team	+ 0"
10	Simon Špilak (SLO)	Team Katusha–Alpecin	+ 6"

General classification after Stage 5
Rank	Rider	Team	Time
1	Nairo Quintana (COL)	Movistar Team	21h 34' 51"
2	Thibaut Pinot (FRA)	FDJ	+ 50"
3	Rohan Dennis (AUS)	BMC Racing Team	+ 1' 06"
4	Primož Roglič (SLO)	LottoNL–Jumbo	+ 1' 15"
5	Tom Dumoulin (NED)	Team Sunweb	+ 1' 19"
6	Geraint Thomas (GBR)	Team Sky	+ 1' 23"
7	Rigoberto Urán (COL)	Cannondale–Drapac	+ 1' 30"
8	Jonathan Castroviejo (ESP)	Movistar Team	+ 1' 32"
9	Bauke Mollema (NED)	Trek–Segafredo	+ 1' 37"
10	Simon Špilak (SLO)	Team Katusha–Alpecin	+ 1' 59"

=== Stage 6 ===
13 March 2017 — Ascoli Piceno to Civitanova Marche, 168 km (104 mi)

Result of Stage 6
Rank	Rider	Team	Time
1	Fernando Gaviria (COL)	Quick-Step Floors	4h 09' 31"
2	Peter Sagan (SVK)	Bora–Hansgrohe	+ 0"
3	Jasper Stuyven (BEL)	Trek–Segafredo	+ 0"
4	Matteo Trentin (ITA)	Quick-Step Floors	+ 0"
5	Jens Debusschere (BEL)	Lotto–Soudal	+ 0"
6	Elia Viviani (ITA)	Team Sky	+ 0"
7	Scott Thwaites (GBR)	Team Dimension Data	+ 0"
8	Eduard-Michael Grosu (ROU)	Nippo–Vini Fantini	+ 0"
9	Anthony Roux (FRA)	FDJ	+ 0"
10	Jürgen Roelandts (BEL)	Lotto–Soudal	+ 0"

General classification after Stage 6
Rank	Rider	Team	Time
1	Nairo Quintana (COL)	Movistar Team	25h 44' 28"
2	Thibaut Pinot (FRA)	FDJ	+ 50"
3	Rohan Dennis (AUS)	BMC Racing Team	+ 1' 06"
4	Primož Roglič (SLO)	LottoNL–Jumbo	+ 1' 15"
5	Tom Dumoulin (NED)	Team Sunweb	+ 1' 19"
6	Geraint Thomas (GBR)	Team Sky	+ 1' 23"
7	Rigoberto Urán (COL)	Cannondale–Drapac	+ 1' 30"
8	Jonathan Castroviejo (ESP)	Movistar Team	+ 1' 32"
9	Bauke Mollema (NED)	Trek–Segafredo	+ 1' 37"
10	Simon Špilak (SLO)	Team Katusha–Alpecin	+ 1' 59"

=== Stage 7 ===
14 March 2017 — San Benedetto del Tronto to San Benedetto del Tronto, 10 km (6 mi), individual time trial (ITT)

Result of Stage 7
Rank	Rider	Team	Time
1	Rohan Dennis (AUS)	BMC Racing Team	11' 18"
2	Jos van Emden (NED)	LottoNL–Jumbo	+ 3"
3	Michael Hepburn (AUS)	Orica–Scott	+ 3"
4	Steve Cummings (GBR)	Team Dimension Data	+ 8"
5	Primož Roglič (SLO)	LottoNL–Jumbo	+ 11"
6	Maciej Bodnar (POL)	Bora–Hansgrohe	+ 15"
7	Edvald Boasson Hagen (NOR)	Team Dimension Data	+ 15"
8	Geraint Thomas (GBR)	Team Sky	+ 16"
9	Ryan Mullen (IRL)	Cannondale–Drapac	+ 17"
10	Alex Dowsett (GBR)	Movistar Team	+ 17"

Final general classification
Rank	Rider	Team	Time
1	Nairo Quintana (COL)	Movistar Team	25h 56' 27"
2	Rohan Dennis (AUS)	BMC Racing Team	+ 25"
3	Thibaut Pinot (FRA)	FDJ	+ 36"
4	Primož Roglič (SLO)	LottoNL–Jumbo	+ 45"
5	Geraint Thomas (GBR)	Team Sky	+ 58"
6	Tom Dumoulin (NED)	Team Sunweb	+ 1' 01"
7	Jonathan Castroviejo (ESP)	Movistar Team	+ 1' 18"
8	Rigoberto Urán (COL)	Cannondale–Drapac	+ 1' 36"
9	Bauke Mollema (NED)	Trek–Segafredo	+ 1' 38"
10	Domenico Pozzovivo (ITA)	AG2R La Mondiale	+ 1' 59"

== Classification leadership table ==
In the 2017 Tirreno–Adriatico, four jerseys were awarded. The general classification was calculated by adding each cyclist's finishing times on each stage. Time bonuses were awarded to the first three finishers on all stages except for the individual time trial: the stage winner won a ten-second bonus, with six and four seconds for the second and third riders respectively. Bonus seconds were also awarded to the first three riders at intermediate sprints; three seconds for the winner of the sprint, two seconds for the rider in second and one second for the rider in third. The leader of the general classification received a blue jersey. This classification was considered the most important of the 2017 Tirreno–Adriatico, and the winner of the classification was considered the winner of the race.

Points for stage victory
Position	1	2	3	4	5	6	7	8	9	10
Points awarded	12	10	8	7	6	5	4	3	2	1

The second classification was the points classification. Riders were awarded points for finishing in the top ten in a stage. Unlike in the points classification in the Tour de France, the winners of all stages – with the exception of the team time trial, which awarded no points towards the classification – were awarded the same number of points. Points were also won in intermediate sprints; five points for crossing the sprint line first, three points for second place, two for third and one for fourth. The leader of the points classification was awarded a red jersey.

Points for the mountains classification
Position	1	2	3	4	5	6	7
Points for Superior	15	10	7	5	3	2	1
Points for single category	5	3	2	1	0		

There was also a mountains classification, for which points were awarded for reaching the top of a climb before other riders. Each climb was categorised as either Superior-, or single-category, with more points available for the more difficult, Superior-category climb, Monte Terminillo. For Monte Terminillo, the top seven riders earned points; on the other climbs, only the top four riders earned points. The leadership of the mountains classification was marked by a green jersey.

The fourth jersey represented the young rider classification, marked by a white jersey. Only riders born after 1 January 1992 were eligible; the young rider best placed in the general classification was the leader of the young rider classification. There was also a classification for teams, in which the times of the best three cyclists in a team on each stage were added together; the leading team at the end of the race was the team with the lowest cumulative time.

Stage	Winner	General classification	Points classification	Mountains classification	Young rider classification	Teams classification
1	BMC Racing Team	Damiano Caruso	Not awarded	Not awarded	Stefan Küng	BMC Racing Team
2	Geraint Thomas	Greg Van Avermaet	Geraint Thomas	Davide Ballerini	Bob Jungels	BMC Racing Team
3	Peter Sagan	Rohan Dennis	Peter Sagan	Davide Ballerini	Bob Jungels	BMC Racing Team
4	Nairo Quintana	Nairo Quintana	Mirco Maestri	Nairo Quintana	Adam Yates	Movistar Team
5	Peter Sagan	Nairo Quintana	Peter Sagan	Nairo Quintana	Egan Bernal	Movistar Team
6	Fernando Gaviria	Nairo Quintana	Peter Sagan	Davide Ballerini	Egan Bernal	Movistar Team
7	Rohan Dennis	Nairo Quintana	Peter Sagan	Davide Ballerini	Bob Jungels	Movistar Team
Final		Nairo Quintana	Peter Sagan	Davide Ballerini	Bob Jungels	Movistar Team

== Final classification standings ==
=== General classification ===
Final general classification
Rank	Rider	Team	Time
1	Nairo Quintana (COL)	Movistar Team	25h 56' 27"
2	Rohan Dennis (AUS)	BMC Racing Team	+ 25"
3	Thibaut Pinot (FRA)	FDJ	+ 36"
4	Primož Roglič (SLO)	LottoNL–Jumbo	+ 45"
5	Geraint Thomas (GBR)	Team Sky	+ 58"
6	Tom Dumoulin (NED)	Team Sunweb	+ 1' 01"
7	Jonathan Castroviejo (ESP)	Movistar Team	+ 1' 18"
8	Rigoberto Urán (COL)	Cannondale–Drapac	+ 1' 36"
9	Bauke Mollema (NED)	Trek–Segafredo	+ 1' 38"
10	Domenico Pozzovivo (ITA)	AG2R La Mondiale	+ 1' 59"

=== Points classification ===
Final points classification
Rank	Rider	Team	Points
1	Peter Sagan (SVK)	Bora–Hansgrohe	42
2	Mirco Maestri (ITA)	Bardiani–CSF	40
3	Geraint Thomas (GBR)	Team Sky	32
4	Tom Dumoulin (NED)	Team Sunweb	19
5	Nairo Quintana (COL)	Movistar Team	17
6	Rohan Dennis (AUS)	BMC Racing Team	17
7	Primož Roglič (SLO)	LottoNL–Jumbo	15
8	Elia Viviani (ITA)	Team Sky	15
9	Fernando Gaviria (COL)	Quick-Step Floors	12
10	Thibaut Pinot (FRA)	FDJ	12

=== Mountains classification ===
Final mountains classification
Rank	Rider	Team	Points
1	Davide Ballerini (ITA)	Androni–Sidermec–Bottecchia	18
2	Alan Marangoni (ITA)	Nippo–Vini Fantini	16
3	Nairo Quintana (COL)	Movistar Team	15
4	Geraint Thomas (GBR)	Team Sky	11
5	Andrey Amador (CRC)	Movistar Team	5
6	Michał Kwiatkowski (POL)	Team Sky	5
7	Peter Sagan (SVK)	Bora–Hansgrohe	5
8	Maurits Lammertink (NED)	Team Katusha–Alpecin	5
9	Iuri Filosi (ITA)	Nippo–Vini Fantini	5
10	Rigoberto Urán (COL)	Cannondale–Drapac	5

=== Young rider classification ===
Final young rider classification
Rank	Rider	Team	Time
1	Bob Jungels (LUX)	Quick-Step Floors	25h 59' 20"
2	Egan Bernal (COL)	Androni–Sidermec–Bottecchia	+ 27"
3	Søren Kragh Andersen (DEN)	Team Sunweb	+ 13' 33"
4	Alberto Bettiol (ITA)	Cannondale–Drapac	+ 26' 24"
5	Jasper Stuyven (BEL)	Trek–Segafredo	+ 27' 47"
6	Gianni Moscon (ITA)	Team Sky	+ 30' 03"
7	Mike Teunissen (NED)	Team Sunweb	+ 30' 09"
8	Tiesj Benoot (BEL)	Lotto–Soudal	+ 31' 37"
9	Matej Mohorič (SLO)	UAE Team Emirates	+ 33' 23"
10	Rick Zabel (GER)	Team Katusha–Alpecin	+ 41' 34"

=== Teams classification ===
Final teams classification
Rank	Team	Time
1	Movistar Team	77h 05' 00"
2	BMC Racing Team	+ 3' 15"
3	Team Sky	+ 7' 41"
4	Astana	+ 15' 19"
5	FDJ	+ 15' 32"
6	Orica–Scott	+ 15' 54"
7	Team Katusha–Alpecin	+ 17' 31"
8	Androni–Sidermec–Bottecchia	+ 18' 33"
9	AG2R La Mondiale	+ 20' 29"
10	Bahrain–Merida	+ 21' 29"
