= 2013 Vuelta a Burgos =

2013 UCI Europe Tour

Race details
- Dates: 7–11 August
- Stages: 5

Results
Jersey awarded to the overall winner	Winner	Nairo Quintana (COL)	(Movistar Team)
	Second	David Arroyo (ESP)	(Caja Rural–Seguros RGA)
	Third	Vincenzo Nibali (ITA)	(Astana)
Jersey awarded to the points classification winner	Points	Anthony Roux (FRA)	(FDJ.fr)
Jersey awarded to the mountains classification winner	Mountains	Amets Txurruka (ESP)	(Caja Rural–Seguros RGA)
Jersey awarded to the sprints classification winner	Sprints	Fabricio Ferrari (URU)	(Caja Rural–Seguros RGA)
	Team	Caja Rural–Seguros RGA	

The 2013 Vuelta a Burgos (English: 2013 Tour of Burgos) is the 35th edition of the Vuelta a Burgos, an annual bicycle race which tours the province of Burgos. The stage race is part of the 2013 UCI Europe Tour, and is classified as a 2.HC event. It was won by Nairo Quintana of the Movistar Team.

== Teams ==
16 teams were invited to participate in the tour: 9 UCI ProTeams, 5 UCI Professional Continental Teams and 2 UCI Continental Teams.

UCI ProTeams
- Ag2r–La Mondiale
- Astana
- Cannondale
- Euskaltel–Euskadi
- FDJ.fr
- Team Katusha
- Movistar Team
- Orica–GreenEDGE
- Team Sky
UCI Professional Continental Teams
- Caja Rural–Seguros RGA
- Cofidis
- Colombia
- NetApp–Endura
- Vini Fantini–Selle Italia
UCI Continental Teams
- Burgos Burpellet BH
- Euskadi

== Route ==
Stage characteristics and winners
Stage	Date	Course	Distance	Winner
1	7 August	Burgos to Burgos	139 km (86 mi)	Simone Ponzi (ITA)
2	8 August	Ribera del Duero to Clunia	157 km (98 mi)	Jens Keukeleire (BEL)
3	9 August	Villadiego to Ojo Guareña	175 km (109 mi)	Alberto Contador (ESP)
4	10 August	Doña Santos to Santo Domingo de Silos	162 km (101 mi)	Anthony Roux (FRA)
5	11 August	Comunero de Revenga to Lagunas de Neila	170 km (110 mi)	Alberto Contador (ESP)

== Classification leadership ==
Stage	Winner	General classification	Points classification	Mountains classification	Sprints classification	Team classification
1	Simone Ponzi	Chris Froome	Alberto Contador	Nairo Quintana	Alberto Contador	Netcompany–Ineos
2	Jens Keukeleire	Anthony Roux	Alberto Contador	Nairo Quintana	Alberto Contador	Netcompany–Ineos
	Alberto Contador	Anthony Roux	Jens Keukeleire	Amets Txurruka	Alberto Contador	Netcompany–Ineos
4	Anthony Roux	Anthony Roux	Jens Voigt	Amets Txurruka	Alberto Contador	Netcompany–Ineos
5	Alberto Contador	Nairo Quintana	Jens Voigt	Amets Txurruka	Alberto Contador	Caja Rural–Seguros RGA
Final		Nairo Quintana	Jens Voigt	Amets Txurruka	Alberto Contador	Netcompany–Ineos
