= Julien Bernard =

French cyclist

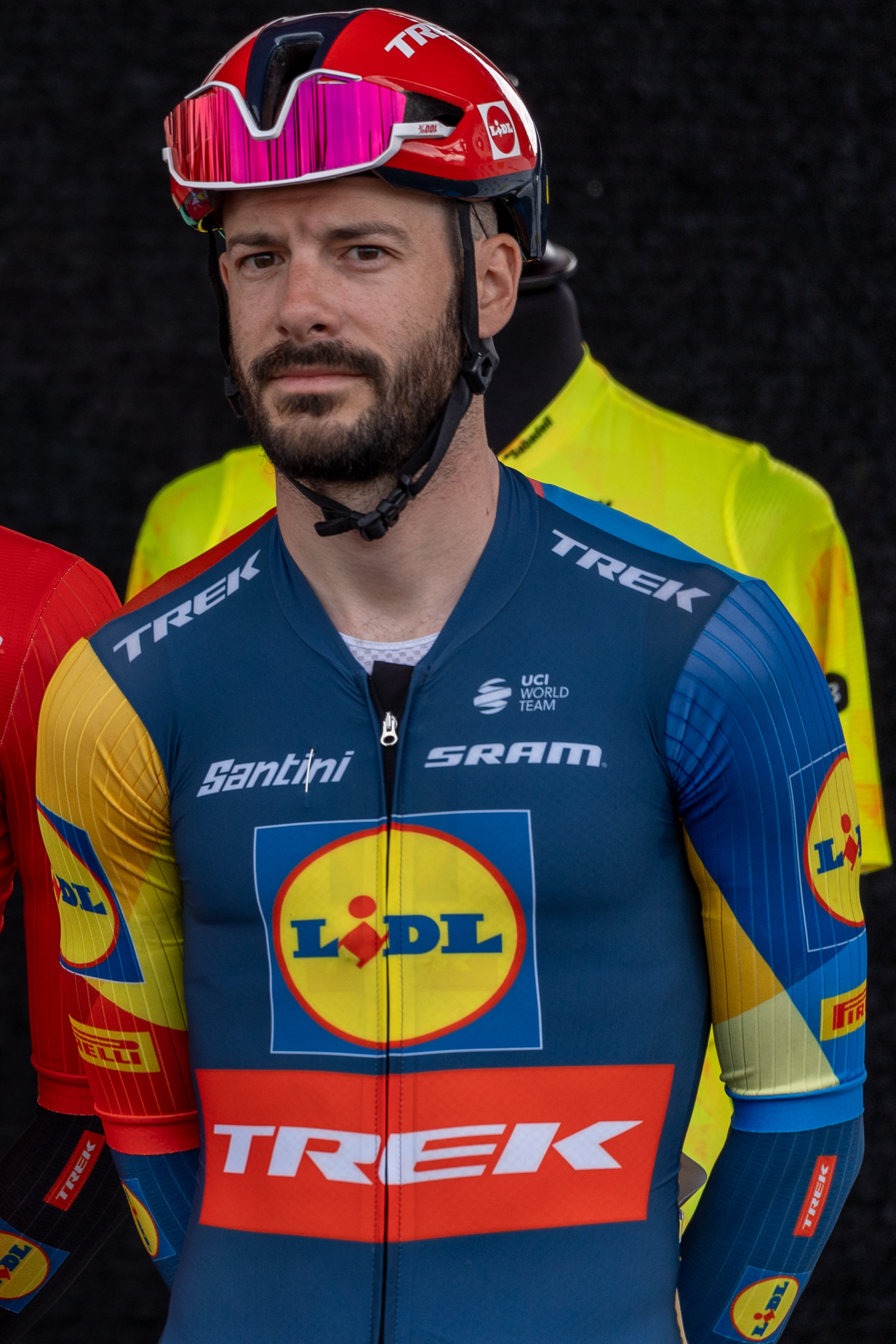
- Bernard in 2024

Personal information
- Full name: Julien Bernard
- Born: 17 March 1992 (age 34) Nevers, France
- Height: 1.76 m (5 ft 9 1/2 in)
- Weight: 60 kg (132 lb; 9 st 6 lb)

Cycling career
- Sport: Cycling
- Current team: Lidl–Trek
- Discipline: Road
- Role: Rider

Amateur team
- 2011–2015: SCO Dijon

Professional teams
- 2015: Trek Factory Racing (stagiaire)
- 2016–: Trek–Segafredo

Julien Bernard (born 17 March 1992) is a French cyclist, who currently rides for UCI WorldTeam Lidl–Trek.

== Career ==
The son of former professional cyclist Jean-François Bernard, Julien Bernard was initially discouraged from taking up cycle racing by his father; he originally played tennis and football as a goalkeeper before switching to cycling at the age of 16. He joined Trek Factory Racing as a stagiaire in 2015, where he ended up becoming the team's lead rider in the USA Pro Cycling Challenge, where he finished tenth overall. Bernard joined the team full-time in 2016, and he was named in the startlist for that year's Vuelta a España and the start list for the 2017 Giro d'Italia. In July 2018, he was named in the start list for the Tour de France.

== Major results ==
2015
6th Overall Tour of Hainan
10th Overall USA Pro Cycling Challenge
2016
6th Overall Abu Dhabi Tour

1st Young rider classification

2018
10th Overall Tour Poitou-Charentes en Nouvelle-Aquitaine
2020
Tour des Alpes-Maritimes et du Var

1st Mountains classification
1st Stage 3

1st Mountains classification, Tour de l'Ain
2021
9th Overall Danmark Rundt
2023
1st Mountains classification, Tour de Romandie
3rd Road race, National Road Championships
10th Overall Tour de l'Ain
10th Japan Cup
2024
2nd Road race, National Road Championships
6th Japan Cup
2025
9th Japan Cup
2026
6th Japan Cup
8th Andorra MoraBanc Clàssica
10th Overall Tour de la Provence

=== Grand Tour general classification results timeline ===
Grand Tour	2016	2017	2018	2019	2020	2021	2022	2023	2024	2025
Giro d'Italia	—	42	—	—	49	—	—	—	—	—
Tour de France	—	—	35	30	—	37	—	—	22	—
Vuelta a España	57	85	—	—	—	—	88	68	—	33

Legend
—	Did not compete
DNF	Did not finish
