= 2020 Tour de l'Ain =

2020 UCI Europe Tour
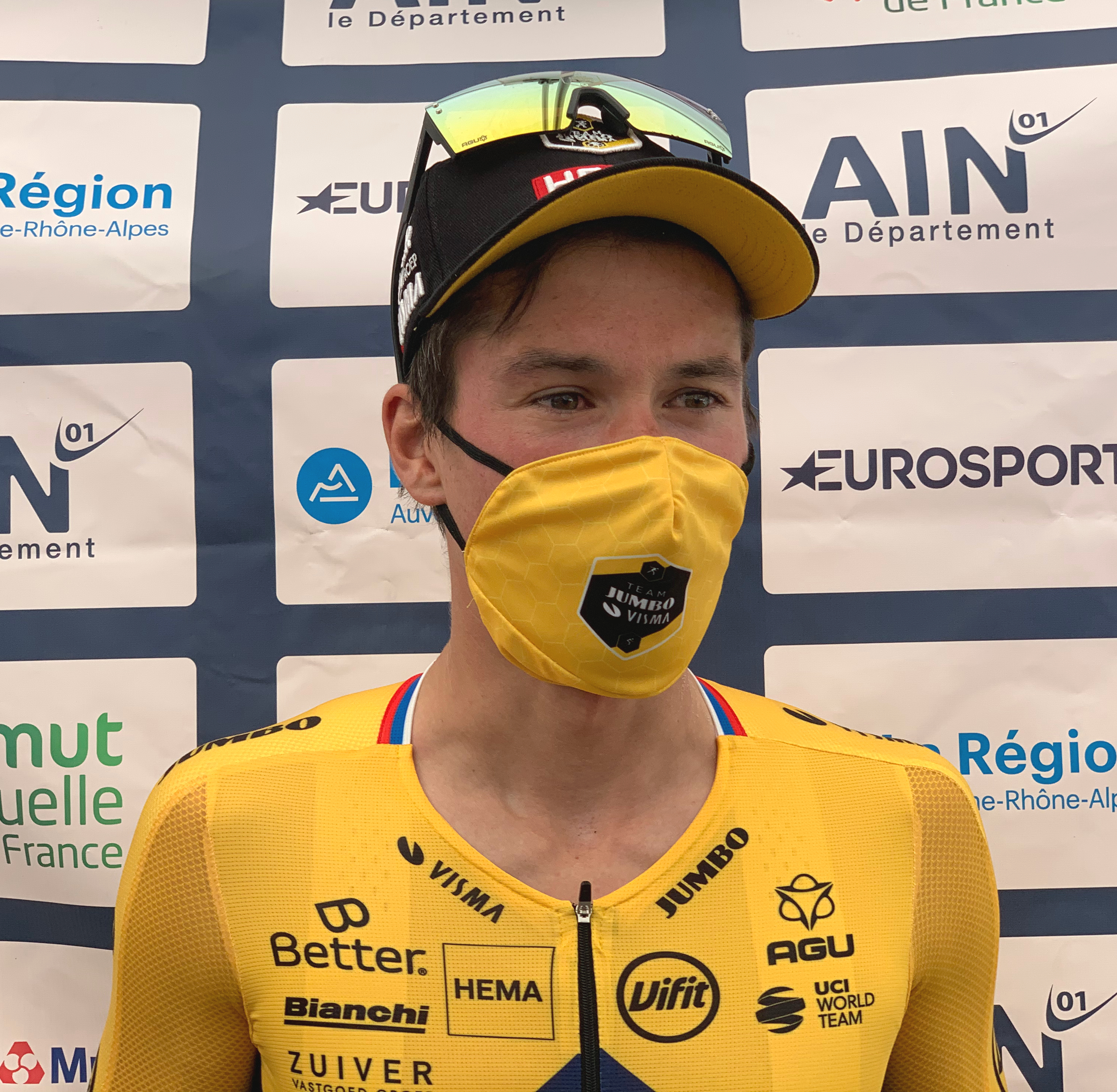

Race details
- Dates: 7–9 August 2020
- Stages: 3
- Distance: 426 km (264.7 mi)

Results
Jersey awarded to the overall winner	Winner	Primož Roglič (SLO)	(Team Jumbo–Visma)
	Second	Egan Bernal (COL)	(Team Ineos)
	Third	Nairo Quintana (COL)	(Arkéa–Samsic)
Jersey awarded to the points classification winner	Points	Primož Roglič (SLO)	(Team Jumbo–Visma)
Jersey awarded to the mountains classification winner	Mountains	Julien Bernard (FRA)	(Trek–Segafredo)
Jersey awarded to the youth classification winner	Youth	João Almeida (POR)	(Deceuninck–Quick-Step)
Jersey awarded to the combativity classification winner	Combativity	Andrea Bagioli (ITA)	(Deceuninck–Quick-Step)
	Team	Team Jumbo–Visma	

The 2020 Tour de l'Ain was a men's road bicycle race that took place from 7 to 9 August 2020 in the Ain department in France. The winner was Primož Roglič. It was the 32nd edition of the Tour de l'Ain. The race is rated as a 2.1 event and forms part of the 2020 UCI Europe Tour.

== Teams ==
Twenty teams participate in the race. The teams that participate are:

UCI WorldTeams

- AG2R La Mondiale
- CCC Team
- Cofidis
- Deceuninck–Quick-Step
- Groupama–FDJ
- Israel Start-Up Nation
- Lotto–Soudal
- Team Ineos
- Team Jumbo–Visma
- Team Sunweb
- Trek–Segafredo
- UAE Team Emirates

UCI Professional Continental Teams

- Arkéa–Samsic
- B&B Hotels–Vital Concept
- Circus–Wanty Gobert
- Nippo–Delko–One Provence
- Sport Vlaanderen–Baloise
- Total Direct Énergie

UCI Continental Teams

- Hagens Berman Axeon
- Kometa Xstra Cycling Team
- Natura4Ever–Roubaix–Lille Métropole
- St. Michel–Auber93

National Teams

- Germany U-23
- Switzerland

== Route ==
Stage characteristics and winners
Stage	Date	Course	Distance	Type	Stage winner
1	7 August	Montréal-la-Cluse to Ceyzériat	140 km (87 mi)	Flat stage	Andrea Bagioli (ITA)
2	8 August	Lagnieu to Lélex Monts-Jura	141 km (88 mi)	Mountain stage	Primož Roglič (SLO)
3	9 August	Saint-Vulbas to Grand Colombier	145 km (90 mi)	Mountain stage	Primož Roglič (SLO)
Total		426 km (265 mi)			

== Stages ==
=== Stage 1 ===
7 August 2020 – Montréal-la-Cluse to Ceyzériat, 140 km (87 mi)

Stage 1 Result
Rank	Rider	Team	Time
1	Andrea Bagioli (ITA)	Deceuninck–Quick-Step	3h 17' 00"
2	Primož Roglič (SLO)	Team Jumbo–Visma	+ 0"
3	Stefan Bissegger (SUI)	Switzerland	+ 0"
4	Tom Dumoulin (NED)	Team Jumbo–Visma	+ 0"
5	Erik Fetter (HUN)	Kometa Xstra Cycling Team	+ 0"
6	Giacomo Garavaglia (ITA)	Kometa Xstra Cycling Team	+ 0"
7	Guillaume Martin (FRA)	Cofidis	+ 0"
8	João Almeida (POR)	Deceuninck–Quick-Step	+ 0"
9	Bauke Mollema (NED)	Trek–Segafredo	+ 0"
10	Valerio Conti (ITA)	UAE Team Emirates	+ 0"

General classification after Stage 1
Rank	Rider	Team	Time
1	Andrea Bagioli (ITA)	Deceuninck–Quick-Step	3h 16' 50"
2	Primož Roglič (SLO)	Team Jumbo–Visma	+ 4"
3	Stefan Bissegger (SUI)	Switzerland	+ 6"
4	Tom Dumoulin (NED)	Team Jumbo–Visma	+ 10"
5	Erik Fetter (HUN)	Kometa Xstra Cycling Team	+ 10"
6	Giacomo Garavaglia (ITA)	Kometa Xstra Cycling Team	+ 10"
7	Guillaume Martin (FRA)	Cofidis	+ 10"
8	João Almeida (POR)	Deceuninck–Quick-Step	+ 10"
9	Bauke Mollema (NED)	Trek–Segafredo	+ 10"
10	Valerio Conti (ITA)	UAE Team Emirates	+ 10"

=== Stage 2 ===
8 August 2020 – Lagnieu to Lélex Monts-Jura, 141 km (88 mi)

Stage 2 Result
Rank	Rider	Team	Time
1	Primož Roglič (SLO)	Team Jumbo–Visma	3h 58' 14"
2	Egan Bernal (COL)	Team Ineos	+ 0"
3	Valerio Conti (ITA)	UAE Team Emirates	+ 0"
4	Nairo Quintana (COL)	Arkéa–Samsic	+ 0"
5	Steven Kruijswijk (NED)	Team Jumbo–Visma	+ 7"
6	Jesús Herrada (ESP)	Cofidis	+ 15"
7	Fabio Aru (ITA)	UAE Team Emirates	+ 16"
8	João Almeida (POR)	Deceuninck–Quick-Step	+ 16"
9	Jonathan Castroviejo (ESP)	Team Ineos	+ 20"
10	Jan Hirt (CZE)	CCC Team	+ 20"

General classification after Stage 2
Rank	Rider	Team	Time
1	Primož Roglič (SLO)	Team Jumbo–Visma	7h 14' 58"
2	Egan Bernal (COL)	Team Ineos	+ 10"
3	Valerio Conti (ITA)	UAE Team Emirates	+ 12"
4	Bauke Mollema (NED)	Trek–Segafredo	+ 16"
5	Nairo Quintana (COL)	Arkéa–Samsic	+ 16"
6	Steven Kruijswijk (NED)	Team Jumbo–Visma	+ 23"
7	Jesús Herrada (ESP)	Cofidis	+ 31"
8	João Almeida (POR)	Deceuninck–Quick-Step	+ 32"
9	Fabio Aru (ITA)	UAE Team Emirates	+ 32"
10	Jan Hirt (CZE)	CCC Team	+ 36"

=== Stage 3 ===
9 August 2020 – Saint-Vulbas to Grand Colombier, 145 km (90 mi)

Stage 3 Result
Rank	Rider	Team	Time
1	Primož Roglič (SLO)	Team Jumbo–Visma	4h 06' 24"
2	Egan Bernal (COL)	Team Ineos	+ 4"
3	Nairo Quintana (COL)	Arkéa–Samsic	+ 6"
4	Guillaume Martin (FRA)	Cofidis	+ 8"
5	Richie Porte (AUS)	Trek–Segafredo	+ 16"
6	Steven Kruijswijk (NED)	Team Jumbo–Visma	+ 23"
7	George Bennett (NZL)	Team Jumbo–Visma	+ 31"
8	Tom Dumoulin (NED)	Team Jumbo–Visma	+ 44"
9	Dan Martin (IRL)	Israel Start-Up Nation	+ 1' 16"
10	João Almeida (POR)	Deceuninck–Quick-Step	+ 1' 58"

Final general classification
Rank	Rider	Team	Time
1	Primož Roglič (SLO)	Team Jumbo–Visma	11h 21' 12"
2	Egan Bernal (COL)	Team Ineos	+ 18"
3	Nairo Quintana (COL)	Arkéa–Samsic	+ 28"
4	Steven Kruijswijk (NED)	Team Jumbo–Visma	+ 56"
5	George Bennett (NZL)	Team Jumbo–Visma	+ 1' 27"
6	Bauke Mollema (NED)	Trek–Segafredo	+ 2' 24"
7	João Almeida (POR)	Deceuninck–Quick-Step	+ 2' 40"
8	Guillaume Martin (FRA)	Cofidis	+ 2' 45"
9	Jesús Herrada (ESP)	Cofidis	+ 3' 39"
10	Fabio Aru (ITA)	UAE Team Emirates	+ 4' 26"

== Classification leadership ==
Classification leadership by stage
Stage	Winner	General classification	Points classification	Mountains classification	Young rider classification	Team classification	Combativity award
1	Andrea Bagioli	Andrea Bagioli	Andrea Bagioli	Ivan Centrone	Andrea Bagioli	Team Jumbo–Visma	Michał Paluta
2	Primož Roglič	Primož Roglič	Primož Roglič	Julien Bernard	João Almeida	Team Jumbo–Visma	Jaakko Hänninen
3	Primož Roglič	Primož Roglič	Primož Roglič	Julien Bernard	João Almeida	Team Jumbo–Visma	Romain Sicard
Final		Primož Roglič	Primož Roglič	Julien Bernard	João Almeida	Team Jumbo–Visma	Andrea Bagioli

== Classification standings ==
Legend
Denotes the winner of the general classification
Denotes the winner of the points classification
Denotes the winner of the mountains classification
Denotes the winner of the young rider classification
Denotes the winner of the combativity award

=== General classification ===
Final general classification
Rank	Rider	Team	Time
1	Primož Roglič (SLO)	Team Jumbo–Visma	11h 21' 12"
2	Egan Bernal (COL)	Team Ineos	+ 18"
3	Nairo Quintana (COL)	Arkéa–Samsic	+ 28"
4	Steven Kruijswijk (NED)	Team Jumbo–Visma	+ 56"
5	George Bennett (NZL)	Team Jumbo–Visma	+ 1' 27"
6	Bauke Mollema (NED)	Trek–Segafredo	+ 2' 24"
7	João Almeida (POR)	Deceuninck–Quick-Step	+ 2' 40"
8	Guillaume Martin (FRA)	Cofidis	+ 2' 45"
9	Jesús Herrada (ESP)	Cofidis	+ 3' 39"
10	Fabio Aru (ITA)	UAE Team Emirates	+ 4' 26"

=== Points classification ===
Final points classification (1–10)
Rank	Rider	Team	Points
1	Primož Roglič (SLO)	Team Jumbo–Visma	70
2	Egan Bernal (COL)	Team Ineos	42
3	Nairo Quintana (COL)	Arkéa–Samsic	30
4	Andrea Bagioli (ITA)	Deceuninck–Quick-Step	25
5	Guillaume Martin (FRA)	Cofidis	24
6	Steven Kruijswijk (NED)	Team Jumbo–Visma	22
7	João Almeida (POR)	Deceuninck–Quick-Step	22
8	Tom Dumoulin (NED)	Team Jumbo–Visma	22
9	Valerio Conti (ITA)	UAE Team Emirates	22
10	Bauke Mollema (NED)	Trek–Segafredo	17

=== Mountains classification ===
Final mountains classification (1–10)
Rank	Rider	Team	Points
1	Julien Bernard (FRA)	Trek–Segafredo	59
2	Primož Roglič (SLO)	Team Jumbo–Visma	35
3	Andrea Bagioli (ITA)	Deceuninck–Quick-Step	25
4	Egan Bernal (COL)	Team Ineos	22
5	George Bennett (NZL)	Team Jumbo–Visma	16
6	Jaakko Hänninen (FIN)	AG2R La Mondiale	16
7	Joey Rosskopf (USA)	CCC Team	15
8	Romain Sicard (FRA)	Total Direct Énergie	14
9	Simon Guglielmi (ITA)	Groupama–FDJ	13
10	Nairo Quintana (COL)	Arkéa–Samsic	11

=== Young rider classification ===
Final young rider classification (1–10)
Rank	Rider	Team	Time
1	João Almeida (POR)	Deceuninck–Quick-Step	11h 23' 52"
2	Michel Ries (LUX)	Trek–Segafredo	+ 11' 46"
3	Thymen Arensman (NED)	Team Sunweb	+ 15' 24"
4	Andrea Bagioli (ITA)	Deceuninck–Quick-Step	+ 16' 35"
5	Ilan Van Wilder (BEL)	Team Sunweb	+ 19' 15"
6	Jakob Geßner (GER)	Germany U-23	+ 21' 20"
7	Kevin Vermaerke (USA)	Hagens Berman Axeon	+ 21' 20"
8	Miguel Heidemann (GER)	Germany U-23	+ 24' 13"
9	Mauri Vansevenant (BEL)	Deceuninck–Quick-Step	+ 26' 03"
10	Johannes Adamietz (GER)	Germany U-23	+ 28' 01"

=== Teams classification ===
Final teams classification (1–10)
Rank	Team	Time
1	Team Jumbo–Visma	34h 06' 25"
2	Team Ineos	+ 14' 35"
3	Cofidis	+ 22' 52"
4	Trek–Segafredo	+ 27' 00"
5	Arkéa–Samsic	+ 36' 02"
6	Deceuninck–Quick-Step	+ 47' 59"
7	UAE Team Emirates	+ 49' 11"
8	AG2R La Mondiale	+ 49' 29"
9	Groupama–FDJ	+ 1h 08' 25"
10	CCC Team	+ 1h 08' 38"
