= 2020 Tour des Alpes-Maritimes et du Var =

2020 UCI Europe Tour

Race details
- Dates: 21–23 February 2020
- Stages: 3
- Distance: 480.5 km (298.6 mi)
- Winning time: 13h 09' 32"

Results
Jersey awarded to the overall winner	Winner	Nairo Quintana (COL)	(Arkéa–Samsic)
	Second	Romain Bardet (FRA)	(AG2R La Mondiale)
	Third	Richie Porte (AUS)	(Trek–Segafredo)
Jersey awarded to the points classification winner	Points	Nairo Quintana (COL)	(Arkéa–Samsic)
Jersey awarded to the mountains classification winner	Mountains	Julien Bernard (FRA)	(Trek–Segafredo)
Jersey awarded to the youth classification winner	Youth	Attila Valter (HUN)	(CCC Team)
	Team	Trek–Segafredo	

The 2020 Tour des Alpes-Maritimes et du Var was a road cycling stage race that took place from 21 to 23 February 2020. The race was rated as a 2.1 event as part of the 2020 UCI Europe Tour, and was the 52nd edition of the Tour des Alpes-Maritimes et du Var, which was known as the Tour du Haut Var prior to 2020.

== Teams ==
Eight UCI WorldTeams, seven UCI ProTeams, and three UCI Continental teams made up the eighteen teams that participated in the race. Only three teams did not enter the maximum allowed of seven riders each; B&B Hotels–Vital Concept, EF Pro Cycling, and St. Michel–Auber93 fielded six apiece. 105 of the 123 riders that started the race finished.

UCI WorldTeams

- AG2R La Mondiale
- CCC Team
- Cofidis
- EF Pro Cycling
- Groupama–FDJ
- NTT Pro Cycling
- Team Jumbo–Visma
- Team Sunweb
- Trek–Segafredo

UCI ProTeams

- Arkéa–Samsic
- B&B Hotels–Vital Concept
- Bingoal–Wallonie Bruxelles
- Nippo–Delko–One Provence
- Rally Cycling
- Riwal Readynez
- Total Direct Énergie
- Uno-X Norwegian Development Team

UCI Continental Teams

- Natura4Ever–Roubaix–Lille Métropole
- St. Michel–Auber93
- Swiss Racing Academy

== Route ==
Stage schedule
Stage	Date	Route	Distance	Type	Winner
1	21 February	Le Cannet to Grasse	186.8 km (116.1 mi)	Hilly stage	Anthony Perez (FRA)
2	22 February	Pégomas to Col d'Èze	175.7 km (109.2 mi)	Hilly stage	Nairo Quintana (COL)
3	23 February	La Londe-les-Maures to Toulon	136 km (85 mi)	Hilly stage	Julien Bernard (FRA)
Total			480.5 km (298.6 mi)		

== Stages ==
=== Stage 1 ===
21 February 2020 — Le Cannet to Grasse, 186.8 km (116.1 mi)

Stage 1 Result
Rank	Rider	Team	Time
1	Anthony Perez (FRA)	Cofidis	4h 54' 03"
2	Anthony Turgis (FRA)	Total Direct Énergie	+ 2"
3	Michael Storer (AUS)	Team Sunweb	+ 4"
4	Thibaut Pinot (FRA)	Groupama–FDJ	+ 6"
5	Attila Valter (HUN)	CCC Team	+ 6"
6	Simon Clarke (AUS)	EF Pro Cycling	+ 6"
7	Benoît Cosnefroy (FRA)	AG2R La Mondiale	+ 6"
8	Julien El Fares (FRA)	Nippo–Delko–One Provence	+ 6"
9	Lilian Calmejane (FRA)	Total Direct Énergie	+ 6"
10	Romain Bardet (FRA)	AG2R La Mondiale	+ 6"

General classification after Stage 1
Rank	Rider	Team	Time
1	Anthony Perez (FRA)	Cofidis	4h 54' 03"
2	Anthony Turgis (FRA)	Total Direct Énergie	+ 2"
3	Michael Storer (AUS)	Team Sunweb	+ 4"
4	Thibaut Pinot (FRA)	Groupama–FDJ	+ 6"
5	Attila Valter (HUN)	CCC Team	+ 6"
6	Simon Clarke (AUS)	EF Pro Cycling	+ 6"
7	Benoît Cosnefroy (FRA)	AG2R La Mondiale	+ 6"
8	Julien El Fares (FRA)	Nippo–Delko–One Provence	+ 6"
9	Lilian Calmejane (FRA)	Total Direct Énergie	+ 6"
10	Romain Bardet (FRA)	AG2R La Mondiale	+ 6"

=== Stage 2 ===
22 February 2020 — Pégomas to Col d'Èze, 175.7 km (109.2 mi)

Stage 2 Result
Rank	Rider	Team	Time
1	Nairo Quintana (COL)	Arkéa–Samsic	4h 44' 17"
2	Simon Clarke (AUS)	EF Pro Cycling	+ 40"
3	Lilian Calmejane (FRA)	Total Direct Énergie	+ 40"
4	Thibaut Pinot (FRA)	Groupama–FDJ	+ 40"
5	Fausto Masnada (ITA)	CCC Team	+ 40"
6	Nicolas Roche (IRL)	Team Sunweb	+ 40"
7	Nicolas Edet (FRA)	Cofidis	+ 40"
8	Sam Oomen (NED)	Team Sunweb	+ 40"
9	Romain Bardet (FRA)	AG2R La Mondiale	+ 40"
10	Laurens Huys (BEL)	Bingoal–Wallonie Bruxelles	+ 40"

General classification after Stage 2
Rank	Rider	Team	Time
1	Nairo Quintana (COL)	Arkéa–Samsic	9h 38' 26"
2	Michael Storer (AUS)	Team Sunweb	+ 38"
3	Simon Clarke (AUS)	EF Pro Cycling	+ 40"
4	Thibaut Pinot (FRA)	Groupama–FDJ	+ 40"
5	Lilian Calmejane (FRA)	Total Direct Énergie	+ 40"
6	Fausto Masnada (ITA)	CCC Team	+ 40"
7	Romain Bardet (FRA)	AG2R La Mondiale	+ 40"
8	Attila Valter (HUN)	CCC Team	+ 40"
9	Sam Oomen (NED)	Team Sunweb	+ 40"
10	Nicolas Edet (FRA)	Cofidis	+ 40"

=== Stage 3 ===
23 February 2020 — La Londe-les-Maures to Toulon, 136 km (85 mi)

Stage 3 Result
Rank	Rider	Team	Time
1	Julien Bernard (FRA)	Trek–Segafredo	3h 28' 51"
2	Nans Peters (FRA)	AG2R La Mondiale	+ 3"
3	Lars van den Berg (NED)	Groupama–FDJ	+ 42"
4	Kenny Molly (BEL)	Bingoal–Wallonie Bruxelles	+ 1' 18"
5	Eddy Finé (FRA)	Cofidis	+ 1' 34"
6	Reinardt Janse van Rensburg (RSA)	NTT Pro Cycling	+ 2' 10"
7	Nairo Quintana (COL)	Arkéa–Samsic	+ 2' 15"
8	Romain Bardet (FRA)	AG2R La Mondiale	+ 2' 15"
9	Richie Porte (AUS)	Trek–Segafredo	+ 2' 15"
10	Tanel Kangert (EST)	EF Pro Cycling	+ 2' 32"

General classification after Stage 3
Rank	Rider	Team	Time
1	Nairo Quintana (COL)	Arkéa–Samsic	13h 09' 32"
2	Romain Bardet (FRA)	AG2R La Mondiale	+ 40"
3	Richie Porte (AUS)	Trek–Segafredo	+ 40"
4	Tanel Kangert (EST)	EF Pro Cycling	+ 57"
5	Nicolas Edet (FRA)	Cofidis	+ 59"
6	Thibaut Pinot (FRA)	Groupama–FDJ	+ 1' 04"
7	Nicolas Roche (IRL)	Team Sunweb	+ 1' 06"
8	Julien El Fares (FRA)	Nippo–Delko–One Provence	+ 1' 06"
9	Fausto Masnada (ITA)	CCC Team	+ 1' 10"
10	Attila Valter (HUN)	CCC Team	+ 1' 14"

== Classification leadership table ==
In the 2020 Tour du Haut Var, four different jerseys were awarded. For the general classification, calculated by adding each cyclist's finishing times on each stage, the leader received a yellow jersey. This classification was considered the most important of the race, and the winner of the classification was considered the winner of the race.

Additionally, there was a points classification, which awarded a green jersey. In the points classification, cyclists received points for finishing in the top 15 in a mass-start stage. For winning a stage, a rider earned 25 points, with 20 for second, 16 for third, 14 for fourth, 12 for fifth, 10 for sixth, then 1 point fewer per place down to 1 for 15th place. Points towards the classification could also be accrued at intermediate sprint points during each stage. There was also a mountains classification, the leadership of which was marked by a red jersey. In the mountains classification, points were won by reaching the top of a climb before other cyclists, with more points available for the higher-categorised climbs.

The fourth jersey represented the young rider classification, marked by a white jersey. This was decided in the same way as the general classification, but only riders born after 1 January 1995 were eligible to be ranked in the classification. There was also a classification for teams, in which the times of the best three cyclists per team on each stage were added together; the leading team at the end of the race was the team with the lowest total time.

Classification leadership by stage
Stage	Winner	General classification	Points classification	Mountains classification	Young rider classification	Team classification
1	Anthony Perez	Anthony Perez	Anthony Perez	Anthony Turgis	Michael Storer	Team Sunweb
2	Nairo Quintana	Nairo Quintana	Anthony Perez	Damian Lüscher	Michael Storer	Team Sunweb
3	Julien Bernard	Nairo Quintana	Nairo Quintana	Julien Bernard	Attila Valter	Trek–Segafredo
Final		Nairo Quintana	Nairo Quintana	Julien Bernard	Attila Valter	Trek–Segafredo

== Final classification standings ==
Legend
Denotes the winner of the general classification	Denotes the winner of the mountains classification
Denotes the winner of the points classification	Denotes the winner of the young rider classification

=== General classification ===
Final general classification (1–10)
Rank	Rider	Team	Time
1	Nairo Quintana (COL)	Arkéa–Samsic	13h 09' 32"
2	Romain Bardet (FRA)	AG2R La Mondiale	+ 40"
3	Richie Porte (AUS)	Trek–Segafredo	+ 40"
4	Tanel Kangert (EST)	EF Pro Cycling	+ 57"
5	Nicolas Edet (FRA)	Cofidis	+ 59"
6	Thibaut Pinot (FRA)	Groupama–FDJ	+ 1' 04"
7	Nicolas Roche (IRL)	Team Sunweb	+ 1' 06"
8	Julien El Fares (FRA)	Nippo–Delko–One Provence	+ 1' 06"
9	Fausto Masnada (ITA)	CCC Team	+ 1' 10"
10	Attila Valter (HUN)	CCC Team	+ 1' 14"

=== Points classification ===
Final points classification (1–10)
Rank	Rider	Team	Points
1	Nairo Quintana (COL)	Arkéa–Samsic	39
2	Anthony Perez (FRA)	Cofidis	37
3	Thibaut Pinot (FRA)	Groupama–FDJ	32
4	Simon Clarke (AUS)	EF Pro Cycling	30
5	Anthony Turgis (FRA)	Total Direct Énergie	30
6	Julien Bernard (FRA)	Trek–Segafredo	25
7	Eddy Finé (FRA)	Cofidis	24
8	Lilian Calmejane (FRA)	Total Direct Énergie	23
9	Romain Bardet (FRA)	AG2R La Mondiale	21
10	Michael Storer (AUS)	Team Sunweb	21

=== Mountains classification ===
Final mountains classification (1–10)
Rank	Rider	Team	Points
1	Julien Bernard (FRA)	Trek–Segafredo	16
2	Damian Lüscher (SUI)	Swiss Racing Academy	14
3	Mathijs Paasschens (NED)	Bingoal–Wallonie Bruxelles	14
4	Anthony Turgis (FRA)	Total Direct Énergie	12
5	Nans Peters (FRA)	Cofidis	12
6	Nigel Ellsay (CAN)	Rally Cycling	8
7	Léo Vincent (FRA)	Groupama–FDJ	6
8	Michael Gogl (AUT)	NTT Pro Cycling	6
9	Alessandro Fedeli (ITA)	Nippo–Delko–One Provence	6
10	Kenny Molly (BEL)	Bingoal–Wallonie Bruxelles	4

=== Young rider classification ===
Final young rider classification (1–10)
Rank	Rider	Team	Time
1	Attila Valter (HUN)	CCC Team	13h 10' 46"
2	Michael Storer (AUS)	Team Sunweb	+ 11"
3	Laurens Huys (BEL)	Bingoal–Wallonie Bruxelles	+ 5' 38"
4	Dorian Godon (FRA)	AG2R La Mondiale	+ 9' 03"
5	Georg Zimmermann (GER)	CCC Team	+ 11' 29"
6	Mark Donovan (GBR)	Team Sunweb	+ 11' 32"
7	Kenny Molly (BEL)	Bingoal–Wallonie Bruxelles	+ 12' 20"
8	Eddy Finé (FRA)	Cofidis	+ 12' 36"
9	Luis Villalobos (MEX)	EF Pro Cycling	+ 14' 20"
10	Will Barta (USA)	CCC Team	+ 14' 20"

=== Team classification ===
Final team classification (1–10)
Rank	Team	Time
1	Trek–Segafredo	39h 29' 59"
2	Groupama–FDJ	+ 1' 32"
3	Team Sunweb	+ 3' 13"
4	CCC Team	+ 4' 06"
5	AG2R La Mondiale	+ 4' 28"
6	Arkéa–Samsic	+ 7' 15"
7	EF Pro Cycling	+ 10' 47"
8	NTT Pro Cycling	+ 11' 00"
9	Nippo–Delko–One Provence	+ 16' 56"
10	Bingoal–Wallonie Bruxelles	+ 21' 00"
