= List of wins by Caja Rural and its successors =

This is a comprehensive list of victories of the Caja Rural–Seguros RGA cycling team. The races are categorized according to the UCI Continental Circuits rules.

== 2010 – Caja Rural ==
Stage 1 Vuelta Ciclista a León, Arturo Mora
Stage 1 Volta a Portugal, Oleg Chuzhda
Stage 5 Volta a Portugal, José Herrada
Overall Cinturó de l'Empordà, José Herrada

Stage 2, José Herrada

== 2011 – Caja Rural ==
Vuelta a Asturias, Javier Moreno

Stage 3, Javier Moreno

== 2012 – Caja Rural ==
Stage 1 Vuelta a Castilla y León, Manuel Cardoso
Stage 3 Vuelta a Castilla y León, Yelko Gómez
Rogaland GP, Antonio Piedra
Stage 2 Circuit de Lorraine, Francesco Lasca
Stage 2 Volta a Portugal, Francesco Lasca
Stage 15 Vuelta a España, Antonio Piedra

== 2013 – Caja Rural–Seguros RGA ==
Vuelta a La Rioja, Francesco Lasca
Vuelta a Asturias, Amets Txurruka

Stage 1, Amets Txurruka

Stage 5 Volta a Portugal, Manuel Cardoso

== 2014 – Caja Rural–Seguros RGA ==
Stage 1 La Tropicale Amissa Bongo, Luis León Sánchez
Klasika Primavera, Pello Bilbao
Stage 3 Vuelta a Castilla y León, Luis León Sánchez
Stage 2 Volta a Portugal, Davide Viganò
Mountains classification Vuelta a España, Luis León Sánchez
Overall Tour du Gévaudan Languedoc-Roussillon, Amets Txurruka

== 2015 – Caja Rural–Seguros RGA ==
Stage 1 Vuelta a Castilla y León, Pello Bilbao
Giro dell'Appennino, Omar Fraile
Stage 6 Tour of Turkey, Pello Bilbao
Stage 8 Tour of Turkey, Lluís Mas
Stage 4 Four Days of Dunkirk, Omar Fraile
Stage 2 Vuelta a la Comunidad de Madrid, Carlos Barbero
Stage 4 Tour of Norway, Amets Txurruka
Philadelphia International Cycling Classic, Carlos Barbero
Overall Tour de Beauce, Pello Bilbao

Stages 1 & 4, Carlos Barbero
Stage 2, Amets Txurruka

Prueba Villafranca de Ordizia, Ángel Madrazo
Stage 5 Volta a Portugal, José Gonçalves
Stage 1 Vuelta a Burgos, Carlos Barbero
Stage 8 Volta a Portugal, Eduard Prades
Mountains classification Vuelta a España, Omar Fraile
Coppa Sabatini, Eduard Prades

== 2016 – Caja Rural–Seguros RGA ==
Stage 4 Étoile de Bessèges, Ángel Madrazo
Overall Presidential Cycling Tour of Turkey, José Gonçalves

Stage 2, Pello Bilbao
Stage 6, Jaime Rosón

Overall Vuelta a Asturias, Hugh Carthy

Stage 1, Hugh Carthy

Stage 1 Volta Internacional Cova da Beira, Eduard Prades
Stage 2 Volta Internacional Cova da Beira, José Gonçalves
Philadelphia International Cycling Classic, Eduard Prades
Stage 7 Volta a Portugal, José Gonçalves
Stage 5 Vuelta a Burgos, Sergio Pardilla

== 2017 – Caja Rural–Seguros RGA ==
Stage 4 Rhône-Alpes Isère Tour, Justin Oien

== 2018 – Caja Rural–Seguros RGA ==
Stage 2 Vuelta a la Comunidad de Madrid, Nelson Soto
Stage 4 Rhône-Alpes Isère Tour, Yannis Yssaad
Prologue Troféu Joaquim Agostinho, Rafael Reis
Circuito de Getxo, Alex Aranburu
Prologue Volta a Portugal, Rafael Reis

== 2019 – Caja Rural–Seguros RGA ==
Clássica da Arrábida, Jonathan Lastra
Stage 2 Vuelta a la Comunidad de Madrid, Alex Aranburu
Stage 1 Boucles de la Mayenne, Mauricio Moreira
Stage 2 Boucles de la Mayenne, Jon Aberasturi
Circuito de Getxo, Jon Aberasturi
Stage 2 Vuelta a Burgos, Jon Aberasturi
Stage 4 Vuelta a Burgos, Alex Aranburu

== 2020 – Caja Rural–Seguros RGA ==
Stage 2 Vuelta a Andalucía, Gonzalo Serrano
Stage 1 Tour de Hongrie, Jon Aberasturi
Stage 1 Belgrade–Banja Luka, Xavier Cañellas
Stage 3 Volta a Portugal, Oier Lazkano

== 2021 – Caja Rural–Seguros RGA ==
Stage 3 Tour of Slovenia, Jon Aberasturi

== 2022 – Caja Rural–Seguros RGA ==
Clássica da Arrábida, Orluis Aular
Overall Volta ao Alentejo, Orluis Aular

Stages 1 & 4 (ITT), Orluis Aular

Stage 2 Ronde de l'Oise, Iúri Leitão
Venezuela National Time Trial Championships, Orluis Aular
Venezuela National Road Race Championships, Orluis Aular
Stage 1 Troféu Joaquim Agostinho, Jonathan Lastra

== 2023 – Caja Rural–Seguros RGA ==
Clássica da Arrábida, Orluis Aular
Overall Volta ao Alentejo, Orluis Aular
Overall International Tour of Hellas, Iúri Leitão

Stage 3, Iúri Leitão

Stages 2 & 3 GP Beiras e Serra da Estrela, Iúri Leitão
Stage 4 GP Beiras e Serra da Estrela, Abel Balderstone
Stage 1 Troféu Joaquim Agostinho, David González
Venezuela National Time Trial Championships, Orluis Aular
Venezuela National Road Race Championships, Orluis Aular
Stage 4 Volta a Portugal, Daniel Babor
Stage 4 Tour de Langkawi, Daniel Babor
Overall CRO Race, Orluis Aular

Stage 2, Iúri Leitão
Stage 5, Orluis Aular

== 2024 – Caja Rural–Seguros RGA ==
Clássica da Arrábida, Joseba López
Overall Volta ao Alentejo, Eduard Prades

Stage 1, Guillermo Thomas Silva
Stage 3, Daniel Babor
Stage 4, Eduard Prades
Stage 5, Iúri Leitão

Stage 2 GP Beiras e Serra da Estrela, Iúri Leitão
Stage 1a (ITT) International Tour of Hellas, Iúri Leitão
Venezuela National Time Trial Championships, Orluis Aular
Ethiopia National Time Trial Championships, Mulu Hailemichael
Overall Troféu Joaquim Agostinho, Orluis Aular

Stage 1, David González
Stage 2, Orluis Aular

Overall Tour of Qinghai Lake, Jefferson Alveiro Cepeda
Clásica Terres de l'Ebre, Abel Balderstone
Stage 1 Tour du Limousin, Orluis Aular
Stage 3 Tour du Limousin, Jefferson Alveiro Cepeda
Trofeo Matteotti, Orluis Aular

== 2025 – Caja Rural–Seguros RGA ==
Trofeo Palma, Iúri Leitão
Uruguay National Road Race Championships, Guillermo Thomas Silva

== 2026 – Caja Rural–Seguros RGA ==
1st Classic Loire Atlantique, Iúri Leitão
1st Presidential Cycling Tour of Turkiye, Sebastian Berwick

== Supplementary statistics ==
'Grand Tours by highest finishing position
Race	2011	2012	2013	2014	2015	2016	2017	2018	2019	2020	2021	2022	2023	2024
Giro d'Italia	–	–	–	–	–	–	–	–	–	–	–	–	–	–
Tour de France	–	–	–	–	–	–	–	–	–	–	–	–	–	–
Vuelta a España	–	21	13	20	12	18	15	25	50	50	32	–	48	–
'Major week-long stage races by highest finishing position
Race	2011	2012	2013	2014	2015	2016	2017	2018	2019	2020	2021	2022	2023	2024
Tour Down Under	–	–	–	–	–	–	–	–	–	–	NH		–	–
Paris–Nice	–	–	–	–	–	–	–	–	–	–	–	–	–	–
Tirreno–Adriatico	–	–	–	–	–	37	–	–	–	–	–	–	–	–
Volta a Catalunya	20	24	36	20	12	9	89	33	–	NH	–	38	73	49
Tour of the Basque Country	20	37	26	37	56	17	41	25	31	NH	26	17	66	
Tour de Romandie	–	–	–	–	–	–	–	–	–	NH	–	–	–	–
Critérium du Dauphiné	–	–	–	–	–	–	–	–	–	–	–	–	–	–
Tour de Suisse	–	–	–	–	–	–	–	–	–	NH	–	–	–	–
Tour de Pologne	–	–	–	–	–	–	–	–	–	–	–	35	–	
Eneco Tour	–	–	–	–	–	–	–	–	–	–	–	NH	–	
'Monument races by highest finishing position
Race	2011	2012	2013	2014	2015	2016	2017	2018	2019	2020	2021	2022	2023	2024
Milan–San Remo	–	–	–	–	–	–	–	–	–	–	–	–	–	–
Tour of Flanders	–	–	–	–	–	–	–	–	–	–	–	–	–	–
Paris–Roubaix	–	–	–	–	–	–	–	–	–	NH	–	–	–	–
Liège–Bastogne–Liège	–	–	–	–	–	–	–	–	–	–	–	–	–	–
Giro di Lombardia	–	–	–	30	–	–	–	–	–	–	–	85	–	–
'Classics by highest finishing position
Classic	2011	2012	2013	2014	2015	2016	2017	2018	2019	2020	2021	2022	2023	2024
Omloop Het Nieuwsblad	–	–	–	–	–	–	–	–	–	–	–	–	–	–
Kuurne–Brussels–Kuurne	–	–	NH	–	–	–	–	–	–	–	–	–	–	–
Strade Bianche	–	–	–	–	–	–	–	–	–	–	–	–	–	–
E3 Harelbeke	–	–	–	–	–	–	–	–	–	NH	–	–	–	–
Gent–Wevelgem	–	–	–	–	–	–	–	–	–	–	–	–	–	–
Amstel Gold Race	–	–	–	–	–	–	–	–	–	NH	–	–	–	–
La Flèche Wallonne	–	–	–	–	–	–	–	–	–	–	–	–	–	–
Clásica de San Sebastián	40	34	26	38	28	32	46	22	28	NH	40	16	37	
Paris–Tours	–	–	–	–	–	–	–	–	–	36	–	–	–	

Legend
—	Did not compete
DNF	Did not finish
NH	Not held
