= 2015 Volta ao Algarve =

Race details
- Dates: 18–22 February 2015
- Stages: 5
- Distance: 782.9 km (486.5 mi)
- Winning time: 19h 46' 13"

Results
Jersey awarded to the overall winner	Winner	Geraint Thomas (GBR)	(Team Sky)
	Second	Michał Kwiatkowski (POL)	(Etixx–Quick-Step)
	Third	Tiago Machado (POR)	(Team Katusha)
Jersey awarded to the points classification winner	Points	Geraint Thomas (GBR)	(Team Sky)
Jersey awarded to the mountains classification winner	Mountains	Richie Porte (AUS)	(Team Sky)
Jersey awarded to the young rider classification winner	Young rider	Davide Formolo (ITA)	(Cannondale–Garmin)
	Team	Team Katusha	

The 2015 Volta ao Algarve was the 41st running of the Volta ao Algarve road cycling stage race. It was rated as a 2.1 event on the UCI Europe Tour and took place from 18 to 22 February 2015 in the Algarve region of Portugal.

The race consisted of five stages, including one summit finish (at Alto do Malhão) and one Individual time trial. The defending champion was Michał Kwiatkowski of Etixx–Quick-Step, who won two stages of the 2014 Volta ao Algarve.

The 2015 race was won by Geraint Thomas of Team Sky. He took the lead with victory in a solo breakaway on stage 2, then defended his lead with third place in the time trial and fourth place on the summit finish. He ended the race 27 seconds ahead of Kwiatkowski, with Tiago Machado (Team Katusha) in third place. Thomas also won the points classification; his teammate Richie Porte won the summit finish and also the mountains classification.

In the other classifications, the young riders competition was won by Davide Formolo (Cannondale–Garmin), Machado won the Portuguese classification and Team Katusha won the team classification.

== Race overview ==
Stage	Date	Route	Distance	Type	Winner
1	18 February	Lagos to Albufeira	166.7 km (104 mi)	Hilly stage	Gianni Meersman (BEL)
2	19 February	Lagoa to Monchique	197.2 km (123 mi)	Hilly stage	Geraint Thomas (GBR)
3	20 February	Vila do Bispo to Cabo de São Vicente	19 km (12 mi)	Individual time trial	Tony Martin (GER)
4	21 February	Tavira to Loulé–Alto do Malhão	215.7 km (134 mi)	Hilly stage	Richie Porte (AUS)
5	22 February	Almodôvar to Vilamoura	184.3 km (115 mi)	Hilly stage	André Greipel (GER)

== Stages ==
=== Stage 1 ===
18 February 2015 — Lagos to Albufeira, 166.7 km (104 mi)

The first stage was a 166.7-kilometre (104-mile) route from Lagos to Albufeira, across generally hilly terrain, though it was expected that the race would end in a bunch sprint.

The early break consisted of Mario González (ActiveJet), Joni Brandão (Efapel), João Benta (Louletano–Ray Just Energy) and Samuel Magalhães (Rádio Popular–Boavista), who earned a lead of almost eight minutes before they were brought back by Lotto–Soudal and Etixx–Quick-Step, seeking to set up their sprinters for the stage win. Brandão was able to gain bonus seconds at both intermediate sprints.

Gianni Meersman (Etixx–Quick-Step) won the sprint ahead of Ben Swift (Team Sky) and Paul Martens (LottoNL–Jumbo) and moved into the race lead. Joni Brandão, having finished on the same time as Meersman, was third in the general classification thanks to the bonus seconds he won.

Stage 1 result
Rank	Rider	Team	Time
1	Gianni Meersman (BEL)	Etixx–Quick-Step	4h 13' 53"
2	Ben Swift (GBR)	Team Sky	+ 0"
3	Paul Martens (GER)	LottoNL–Jumbo	+ 0"
4	Roy Jans (BEL)	Wanty–Groupe Gobert	+ 0"
5	Zdeněk Štybar (CZE)	Etixx–Quick-Step	+ 0"
6	Raymond Kreder (NED)	Team Roompot	+ 0"
7	Jesús Herrada (ESP)	Movistar Team	+ 0"
8	Ramūnas Navardauskas (LTU)	Cannondale–Garmin	+ 0"
9	Michał Kwiatkowski (POL)	Etixx–Quick-Step	+ 0"
10	Guillaume Boivin (CAN)	Optum–Kelly Benefit Strategies	+ 0"

General classification after stage 1
Rank	Rider	Team	Time
1	Gianni Meersman (BEL)	Etixx–Quick-Step	4h 13' 43"
2	Ben Swift (GBR)	Team Sky	+ 4"
3	Joni Brandão (POR)	Efapel	+ 5"
4	Paul Martens (GER)	LottoNL–Jumbo	+ 6"
5	Roy Jans (BEL)	Wanty–Groupe Gobert	+ 10"
6	Zdeněk Štybar (CZE)	Etixx–Quick-Step	+ 10"
7	Raymond Kreder (NED)	Team Roompot	+ 10"
8	Jesús Herrada (ESP)	Movistar Team	+ 10"
9	Ramūnas Navardauskas (LTU)	Cannondale–Garmin	+ 10"
10	Michał Kwiatkowski (POL)	Etixx–Quick-Step	+ 10"

=== Stage 2 ===
19 February 2015 — Lagoa to Monchique, 197.2 km (123 mi)

Stage 2 was a mixed stage: the first part saw the riders riding across gentle hills, but the final part of the 197.2-kilometre (123-mile) course was much more demanding, with several difficult climbs in the last 70 kilometres (43 miles).

The first major breakaway was formed by Marcel Sieberg (Lotto–Soudal), Andreas Schillinger (Bora–Argon 18), Fabricio Ferrari (Caja Rural–Seguros RGA), Wesley Kreder (Team Roompot) and Ivan Balykin (RusVelo). They built a lead of more than five minutes, but were caught in the mountainous portion of the race with more than 25 kilometres (16 miles) remaining on the stage. A second breakaway then attacked, formed of Bakhtiyar Kozhatayev (Astana), Jonathan Castroviejo (Movistar Team), Ian Boswell (Team Sky), Phil Gaimon (Optum–Kelly Benefit Strategies) and Alberto Gallego (Rádio Popular–Boavista). This group was caught before the final climb of the race.

The final climb finished 5.4 kilometres (3 miles) from the end of the stage. Rein Taaramäe (Astana) attacked on this climb, before Geraint Thomas (Team Sky) launched his own attack. Thomas was able to catch and pass Taaramäe, taking a solo victory by 19 seconds ahead of Taaramäe and 23 seconds ahead of the rest of the lead group. With bonus seconds taken into consideration, Thomas now led the general classification by 30 seconds, as well as leading the points and mountains classifications. His teammate Sebastián Henao led the young riders classification. This was Thomas' first win of the season.

Stage 2 result
Rank	Rider	Team	Time
1	Geraint Thomas (GBR)	Team Sky	4h 59' 13"
2	Rein Taaramäe (EST)	Astana	+ 19"
3	Valerio Agnoli (ITA)	Astana	+ 23"
4	Luis León Sánchez (ESP)	Astana	+ 23"
5	Rubén Fernández (ESP)	Movistar Team	+ 23"
6	Michał Kwiatkowski (POL)	Etixx–Quick-Step	+ 23"
7	Zdeněk Štybar (CZE)	Etixx–Quick-Step	+ 23"
8	Alberto Losada (ESP)	Team Katusha	+ 23"
9	Sergey Chernetskiy (RUS)	Team Katusha	+ 23"
10	Lars Petter Nordhaug (NOR)	Team Sky	+ 23"

General classification after stage 2
Rank	Rider	Team	Time
1	Geraint Thomas (GBR)	Team Sky	9h 12' 56"
2	Rein Taaramäe (EST)	Astana	+ 30"
3	Zdeněk Štybar (CZE)	Etixx–Quick-Step	+ 33"
4	Michał Kwiatkowski (POL)	Etixx–Quick-Step	+ 33"
5	Luis León Sánchez (ESP)	Astana	+ 33"
6	Rubén Fernández (ESP)	Movistar Team	+ 33"
7	Richie Porte (AUS)	Team Sky	+ 33"
8	Sergey Chernetskiy (RUS)	Team Katusha	+ 33"
9	Tony Martin (GER)	Etixx–Quick-Step	+ 33"
10	Tiago Machado (POR)	Team Katusha	+ 33"

=== Stage 3 ===
20 February 2015 — Vila do Bispo to Cabo de São Vicente, 19 km (12 mi), individual time trial (ITT)

Stage 3 was a 19-kilometre (12-mile) individual time trial from Vila do Bispo to Cabo de São Vicente. Though there were no significant climbs, the route was hilly throughout. There was additional difficulty caused by a headwind. The pre-stage favourite was former world time trial champion Tony Martin (Etixx–Quick-Step), who was wearing the German time trial champion's jersey for the first time in four years.

Adriano Malori (Movistar Team), who had won the time trial in the 2015 Tour de San Luis, set an early time of 21' 51". Martin was 10 seconds ahead at the checkpoint halfway along the course, but could not hold this advantage to the finish; he ended up winning the stage by 0.4 seconds from Malori. Geraint Thomas (Team Sky), riding in the yellow skinsuit of the race leader, was ten seconds ahead of Martin at the checkpoint, but faded over the final kilometres to finish three seconds behind Martin and Malori. Defending champion Michał Kwiatkowski was fourth. Thomas therefore increased his race lead, with Martin and Kwiatkowski in second and third.

Stage 3 result
Rank	Rider	Team	Time
1	Tony Martin (GER)	Etixx–Quick-Step	21' 51"
2	Adriano Malori (ITA)	Movistar Team	+ 0"
3	Geraint Thomas (GBR)	Team Sky	+ 3"
4	Michał Kwiatkowski (POL)	Etixx–Quick-Step	+ 9"
5	Anton Vorobyev (RUS)	Team Katusha	+ 19"
6	Jonathan Castroviejo (ESP)	Movistar Team	+ 26"
7	Rein Taaramäe (EST)	Astana	+ 26"
8	Luis León Sánchez (ESP)	Astana	+ 32"
9	Sergey Chernetskiy (RUS)	Team Katusha	+ 34"
10	Tiago Machado (POR)	Team Katusha	+ 37"

General classification after stage 3
Rank	Rider	Team	Time
1	Geraint Thomas (GBR)	Team Sky	9h 34' 50"
2	Tony Martin (GER)	Etixx–Quick-Step	+ 30"
3	Michał Kwiatkowski (POL)	Etixx–Quick-Step	+ 39"
4	Rein Taaramäe (EST)	Astana	+ 53"
5	Luis León Sánchez (ESP)	Astana	+ 1' 02"
6	Sergey Chernetskiy (RUS)	Team Katusha	+ 1' 04"
7	Tiago Machado (POR)	Team Katusha	+ 1' 07"
8	Zdeněk Štybar (CZE)	Etixx–Quick-Step	+ 1' 31"
9	Richie Porte (AUS)	Team Sky	+ 1' 33"
10	Rubén Fernández (ESP)	Movistar Team	+ 1' 38"

=== Stage 4 ===
21 February 2015 — Tavira to Loulé–Alto do Malhão, 215.7 km (134 mi)

The fourth stage was the queen stage of the race, a 215.7-kilometre (134-mile) route from Tavira to the Alto do Malhão in Loulé. The first part of the stage was relatively flat, before a difficult final section. This included three difficult climbs in the final 45 kilometres (28 miles), before the summit finish.

The race was controlled throughout by Team Sky in defence of Geraint Thomas' yellow jersey. The day's main break was formed by Davide Malacarne (Astana), Tony Gallopin (Lotto–Soudal), Adriano Malori (Movistar Team), Maurits Lammertink (Team Roompot), Kamil Gradek (ActiveJet), Filipe Cardoso (Efapel) and Beñat Txoperena (Murias Taldea). They gained a lead of over four minutes, while another group attacked from behind. This group included Tony Martin Etixx–Quick-Step, in second place in the general classification. Both groups were caught before the penultimate climb, when Martin's teammate Zdeněk Štybar, eighth overall, attacked to lead over the climb. Heading into the final climb, however, Thomas was supported by his teammate Richie Porte, whose pace reduced the leading group to nine riders. Porte was then able to attack and take the stage victory. He was three seconds ahead of defending champion Michał Kwiatkowski Etixx–Quick-Step and a further three seconds ahead of Ion Izagirre (Movistar Team). Thomas finished fourth on the stage to defend his overall race lead.

Stage 4 result
Rank	Rider	Team	Time
1	Richie Porte (AUS)	Team Sky	5h 55' 34"
2	Michał Kwiatkowski (POL)	Etixx–Quick-Step	+ 3"
3	Ion Izagirre (ESP)	Movistar Team	+ 6"
4	Geraint Thomas (GBR)	Team Sky	+ 9"
5	Michael Woods (CAN)	Optum–Kelly Benefit Strategies	+ 13"
6	Tiago Machado (POR)	Team Katusha	+ 13"
7	Davide Formolo (ITA)	Cannondale–Garmin	+ 16"
8	Alberto Losada (ESP)	Team Katusha	+ 21"
9	Luis León Sánchez (ESP)	Astana	+ 25"
10	José Mendes (POR)	Bora–Argon 18	+ 31"

General classification after stage 4
Rank	Rider	Team	Time
1	Geraint Thomas (GBR)	Team Sky	15h 30' 33"
2	Michał Kwiatkowski (POL)	Etixx–Quick-Step	+ 27"
3	Tiago Machado (POR)	Team Katusha	+ 1' 11"
4	Richie Porte (AUS)	Team Sky	+ 1' 14"
5	Luis León Sánchez (ESP)	Astana	+ 1' 18"
6	Rein Taaramäe (EST)	Astana	+ 1' 19"
7	Sergey Chernetskiy (RUS)	Team Katusha	+ 1' 32"
8	Alberto Losada (ESP)	Team Katusha	+ 1' 55"
9	Rubén Fernández (ESP)	Movistar Team	+ 2' 04"
10	Ion Izagirre (ESP)	Movistar Team	+ 2' 21"

=== Stage 5 ===
22 February 2015 — Almodôvar to Vilamoura, 184.3 km (115 mi)

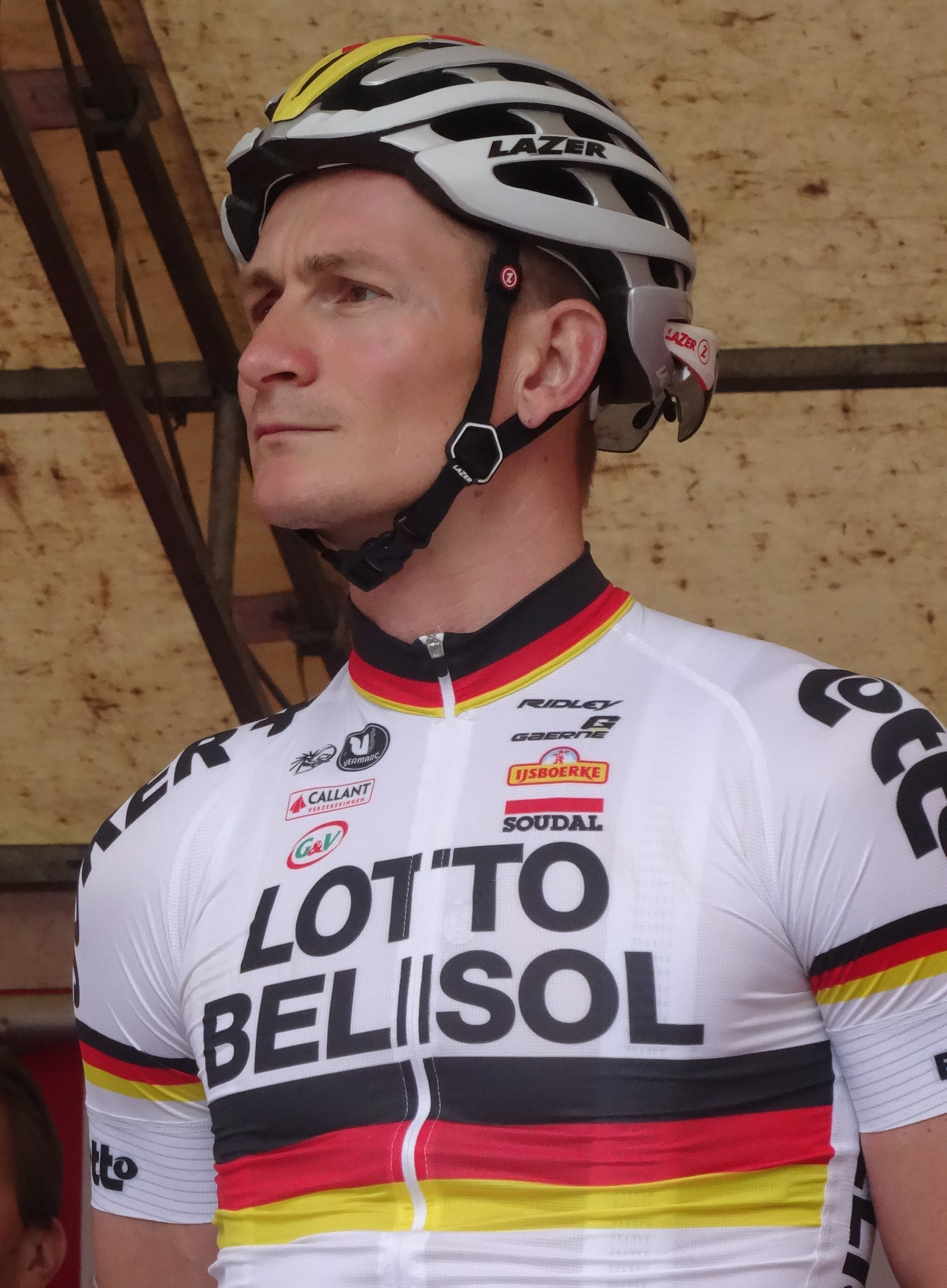
André Greipel, winner of stage 5

The fifth and final stage of the race was a 184.3-kilometre (115-mile) route from Almodôvar to Vilamoura. The first half of the stage was fairly hilly, but the final 80 kilometres (50 miles) were fairly flat.

There was an early break of three riders: Paweł Bernas (ActiveJet), Diego Rubio (Efapel) and Imanol Estévez (Murias Taldea). They were then joined by Heiner Parra (Caja Rural–Seguros RGA). The group was initially allowed plenty of time by Team Sky and were able to climb the day's only categorised climb in the lead, but were caught on the descent. A new break then escaped, made up of Lluís Mas (Caja Rural–Seguros RGA) and Beñat Txoperena (Murias Taldea). They were joined first by Micael Isidoro (Louletano–Ray Just Energy), and David de la Fuente (Efapel) and then also by Adriano Malori and Jonathan Castroviejo (Movistar Team). They were never allowed a significant lead, with Lotto–Soudal leading the chase on behalf of André Greipel. Greipel was able to win the stage in the bunch sprint, ahead of Tom Van Asbroeck (LottoNL–Jumbo) and Raymond Kreder (Team Roompot). Kreder, however, was relegated for improper sprinting and third place on the stage went to Rüdiger Selig (Team Katusha). None of the classifications changed hands in the final stage, so Geraint Thomas won the overall victory in the race.

Stage 5 result
Rank	Rider	Team	Time
1	André Greipel (GER)	Lotto–Soudal	4h 15' 40"
2	Tom Van Asbroeck (BEL)	LottoNL–Jumbo	+ 0"
3	Rüdiger Selig (GER)	Team Katusha	+ 0"
4	Gianni Meersman (BEL)	Etixx–Quick-Step	+ 0"
5	Phil Bauhaus (GER)	Bora–Argon 18	+ 0"
6	Roy Jans (BEL)	Wanty–Groupe Gobert	+ 0"
7	Jürgen Roelandts (BEL)	Lotto–Soudal	+ 0"
8	Alexander Porsev (RUS)	Team Katusha	+ 0"
9	Ben Swift (GBR)	Team Sky	+ 0"
10	Filipe Cardoso (POR)	Efapel	+ 0"

Final general classification
Rank	Rider	Team	Time
1	Geraint Thomas (GBR)	Team Sky	19h 46' 13"
2	Michał Kwiatkowski (POL)	Etixx–Quick-Step	+ 27"
3	Tiago Machado (POR)	Team Katusha	+ 1' 11"
4	Richie Porte (AUS)	Team Sky	+ 1' 14"
5	Luis León Sánchez (ESP)	Astana	+ 1' 18"
6	Rein Taaramäe (EST)	Astana	+ 1' 19"
7	Sergey Chernetskiy (RUS)	Team Katusha	+ 1' 32"
8	Alberto Losada (ESP)	Team Katusha	+ 1' 55"
9	Rubén Fernández (ESP)	Movistar Team	+ 2' 04"
10	Ion Izagirre (ESP)	Movistar Team	+ 2' 21"

== Classification leadership table ==
In the 2015 Volta ao Algarve, five different jerseys were awarded. For the general classification, calculated by adding each cyclist's finishing times on each stage, and allowing time bonuses for the first three finishers at intermediate sprints and at the finish of mass-start stages, the leader received a yellow jersey. This classification was considered the most important of the 2015 Volta ao Algarve, and the winner of the classification was considered the winner of the race.

Additionally, there was a points classification, which awarded a green jersey. In the points classification, cyclists received points for finishing in the top 10 in a mass-start stage. For winning a stage, a rider earned 25 points, with 20 for second, 16 for third, 13 for fourth, 10 for fifth, 8 for sixth, 6 for seventh, 4 for eighth, 2 for ninth and 1 for tenth place. Points towards the classification could also be accrued at intermediate sprint points during each stage; these intermediate sprints also offered bonus seconds towards the general classification. There was also a mountains classification, the leadership of which was marked by a blue jersey. In the mountains classification, points were won by reaching the top of a climb before other cyclists, with more points available for the higher-categorised climbs.

The fourth jersey represented the young rider classification, marked by a white jersey. This was decided in the same way as the general classification, but only riders born after 1 January 1992 were eligible to be ranked in the classification. The fifth jersey represented the Portuguese rider classification, marked by an orange jersey. This was calculated in the same manner as the general classification, calculated by adding each Portuguese cyclist's finishing times on each stage. There was also a classification for teams, in which the times of the best three cyclists per team on each stage were added together; the leading team at the end of the race was the team with the lowest total time.

Stage	Winner	General classification	Mountains classification	Young rider classification	Points classification	Portuguese classification	Teams classification
1	Gianni Meersman	Gianni Meersman	Mario González	Davide Formolo	Gianni Meersman	Joni Brandão	Etixx–Quick-Step
2	Geraint Thomas	Geraint Thomas	Geraint Thomas	Sebastián Henao	Geraint Thomas	Tiago Machado	Team Sky
3	Tony Martin	Geraint Thomas	Geraint Thomas	Sebastián Henao	Geraint Thomas	Tiago Machado	Etixx–Quick-Step
4	Richie Porte	Geraint Thomas	Richie Porte	Davide Formolo	Geraint Thomas	Tiago Machado	Team Katusha
5	André Greipel	Geraint Thomas	Richie Porte	Davide Formolo	Geraint Thomas	Tiago Machado	Team Katusha
Final		Geraint Thomas	Richie Porte	Davide Formolo	Geraint Thomas	Tiago Machado	Team Katusha
