= 2015 Vuelta =

2015 Vuelta can refer to:

- 2015 Vuelta a España
- 2015 Vuelta a Andalucía
- 2015 Vuelta a Asturias
- 2015 Vuelta a Burgos
- 2015 Vuelta a Castilla y León
- 2015 Vuelta a Colombia
- 2015 Vuelta a la Comunidad de Madrid
