= Alexey Rybalkin =

Russian cyclist

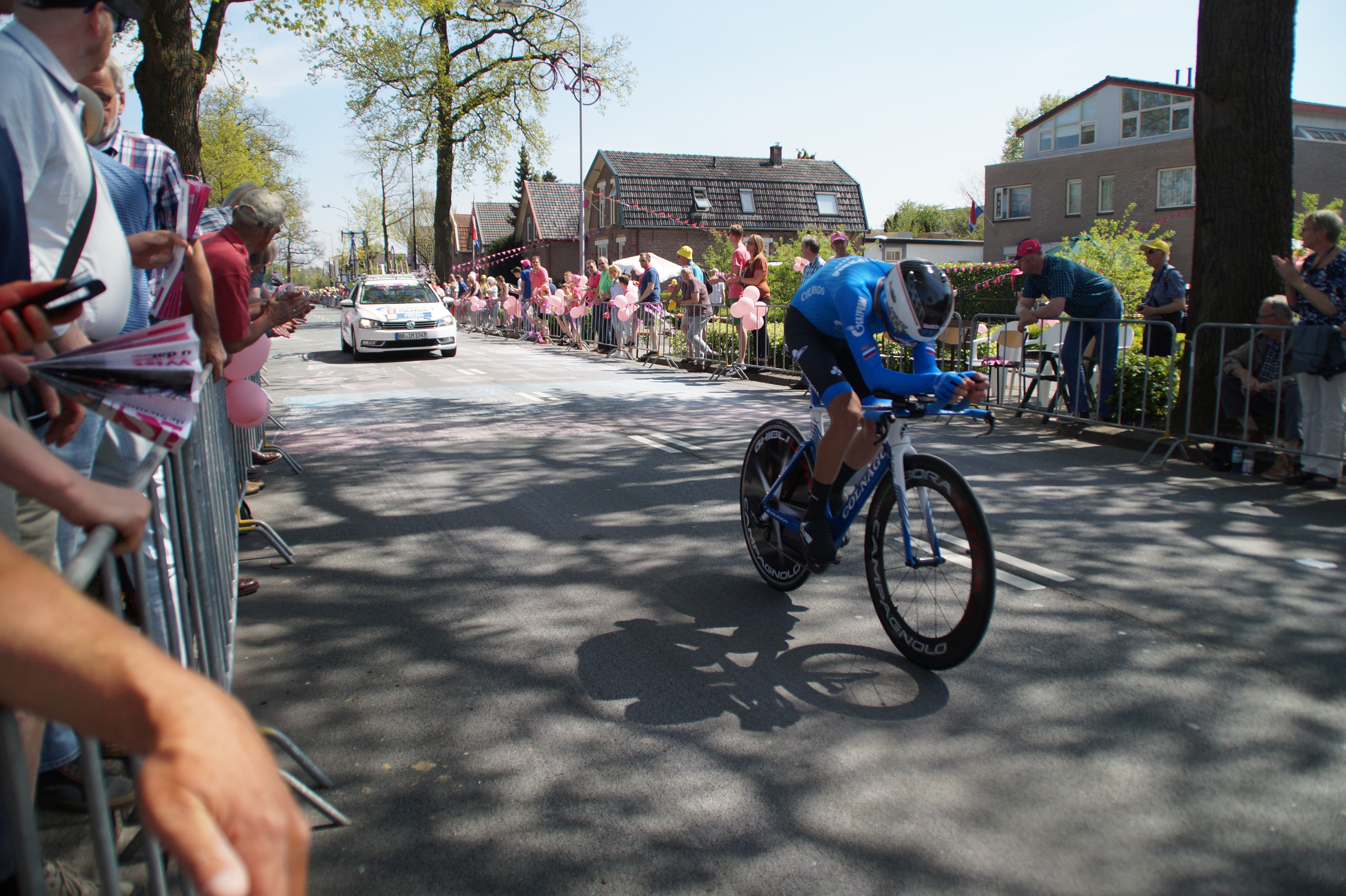
- Rybalkin at the 2016 Giro d'Italia

Personal information
- Full name: Alexey Vladimirovich Rybalkin; Алексей Владимирович Рыбалкин
- Born: 16 November 1993 (age 32) Russia

Cycling career
- Sport: Cycling
- Discipline: Road
- Role: Rider
- Rider type: Climber

Professional teams
- 2012–2015: Lokosphinx
- 2016–2020: Gazprom–RusVelo

Alexey Vladimirovich Rybalkin (Russian: Алексей Владимирович Рыбалкин; born 16 November 1993) is a Russian cyclist, who most recently rode for UCI ProTeam Gazprom–RusVelo. He was named in the start list for the 2016 Giro d'Italia.

== Major results ==
2011
5th Road race, UEC European Junior Road Championships
2013
10th Vuelta a la Comunidad de Madrid
2014
3rd Overall Tour de l'Avenir
4th Overall Vuelta a Castilla y León
4th Overall Volta a Portugal do Futuro

1st Mountains classification

2015
1st Young rider classification Vuelta a la Comunidad de Madrid
1st Young rider classification Volta a Portugal
2017
8th Overall Tour of Austria
2018
2nd Overall Sibiu Cycling Tour
2019
5th Overall Tour de l'Ain

=== Grand Tour general classification results timeline ===
Grand Tour	2016
Giro d'Italia	106
Tour de France	—
Vuelta a España	—

Legend
—	Did not compete
DNF	Did not finish
