= 2015 Vuelta a la Comunidad de Madrid =

2015 UCI Europe Tour

Race details
- Dates: 9–10 May
- Stages: 2
- Distance: 295.95 km (183.89 mi)
- Winning time: 7h 09' 23"

Results
Jersey awarded to the overall winner	Winner	Evgeny Shalunov (RUS)	(Lokosphinx)
	Second	Diego Rubio (ESP)	(Efapel)
	Third	Alberto Gallego (ESP)	(Rádio Popular–Boavista)
Jersey awarded to the points classification winner	Points	Evgeny Shalunov (RUS)	(Lokosphinx)
Jersey awarded to the mountains classification winner	Mountains	Eduard Prades (ESP)	(Caja Rural–Seguros RGA)
	Youth	Alexey Rybalkin (RUS)	(Lokosphinx)
Jersey awarded to the sprints classification winner	Sprints	Hugo Sabido (POR)	(Louletano–Ray Just Energy)
	Team	Lokosphinx	

The 2015 Vuelta a la Comunidad de Madrid was the 28th edition of the Vuelta a la Comunidad de Madrid cycling stage race. It started on 9 May in Colmenar Viejo and ended on 10 May in El Pardo.

== Schedule ==
Two stages were held.

Stage	Date	Course	Distance	Type	Winner	Ref
1	9 May	Colmenar Viejo to Colmenar Viejo	200 km (124.3 mi)	Mountain stage	Evgeny Shalunov (RUS)	
2	10 May	Distrito de Fuencarral to El Pardo (Barrio del Pilar)	95.95 km (59.6 mi)	Intermediate stage	Carlos Barbero (ESP)	
Total		295.95 km (183.9 mi)				

== Teams ==
The start list included 11 teams: 1 UCI WorldTeam, 1 UCI Professional Continental team, and 9 UCI Continental teams.

World Teams

- Movistar Team

Professional Continental teams

- Caja Rural–Seguros RGA

Continental teams

- Burgos BH
- Murias Taldea
- Efapel
- W52–Quinta da Lixa
- LA Alumínios–Antarte
- Louletano–Ray Just Energy
- Rádio Popular–Boavista
- Lokosphinx
- Inteja–MMR Dominican Cycling Team

== Stages ==
=== Stage 1 ===
9 May 2015 — Colmenar Viejo to Colmenar Viejo, 200 km (124.3 mi)

Stage 1 result and General classification after stage 1
Rank	Rider	Team	Time
1	Evgeny Shalunov (RUS)	Lokosphinx	4h 58' 19"
2	Diego Rubio (ESP)	Efapel	+ 22"
3	Alberto Gallego (ESP)	Rádio Popular–Boavista	+ 35"
4	Amets Txurruka (ESP)	Caja Rural–Seguros RGA	+ 1' 02"
5	Marcos García (ESP)	Louletano–Ray Just Energy	+ 1' 02"
6	Javier Moreno (ESP)	Movistar Team	+ 1' 02"
7	Pablo Torres (ESP)	Burgos BH	+ 1' 02"
8	Delio Fernández (ESP)	W52–Quinta da Lixa	+ 1' 02"
9	David Arroyo (ESP)	Caja Rural–Seguros RGA	+ 1' 02"
10	Joni Brandão (POR)	Efapel	+ 1' 02"

=== Stage 2 ===
10 May 2015 — Distrito de Fuencarral to El Pardo (Barrio del Pilar), 95.95 km (59.6 mi)

Stage 2 result
Rank	Rider	Team	Time
1	Carlos Barbero (ESP)	Caja Rural–Seguros RGA	2h 11' 04"
2	Enrique Sanz (ESP)	Movistar Team	+ 0"
3	Adrián González (ESP)	Murias Taldea	+ 0"
4	Samuel Caldeira (POR)	W52–Quinta da Lixa	+ 0"
5	Imanol Estévez (ESP)	Murias Taldea	+ 0"
6	Eduard Prades (ESP)	Caja Rural–Seguros RGA	+ 0"
7	Amets Txurruka (ESP)	Caja Rural–Seguros RGA	+ 0"
8	Nacho Pérez (ESP)	W52–Quinta da Lixa	+ 0"
9	Pablo Torres (ESP)	Burgos BH	+ 0"
10	Filipe Cardoso (POR)	Efapel	+ 0"

Final general classification
Rank	Rider	Team	Time
1	Evgeny Shalunov (RUS)	Lokosphinx	7h 09' 23"
2	Diego Rubio (ESP)	Efapel	+ 22"
3	Alberto Gallego (ESP)	Rádio Popular–Boavista	+ 35"
4	Amets Txurruka (ESP)	Caja Rural–Seguros RGA	+ 1' 02"
5	Pablo Torres (ESP)	Burgos BH	+ 1' 02"
6	Javier Moreno (ESP)	Movistar Team	+ 1' 02"
7	Marcos García (ESP)	Louletano–Ray Just Energy	+ 1' 02"
8	Joni Brandão (POR)	Efapel	+ 1' 02"
9	David Arroyo (ESP)	Caja Rural–Seguros RGA	+ 1' 02"
10	Dmitri Sokolov (RUS)	Lokosphinx	+ 1' 05"

== Classification leadership table ==
Stage	Winner	General classification	Points classification	Mountains classification	Sprints classification	Young rider classification	Teams classification
1	Evgeny Shalunov	Evgeny Shalunov	Evgeny Shalunov	Eduard Prades	Hugo Sabido	Alexey Rybalkin	Lokosphinx
2	Carlos Barbero	Evgeny Shalunov	Evgeny Shalunov	Eduard Prades	Hugo Sabido	Alexey Rybalkin	Lokosphinx
Final		Evgeny Shalunov	Evgeny Shalunov	Eduard Prades	Hugo Sabido	Alexey Rybalkin	Lokosphinx

== Final standings ==
=== General classification ===
Final general classification
Rank	Rider	Team	Time
1	Evgeny Shalunov (RUS)	Lokosphinx	7h 09' 23"
2	Diego Rubio (ESP)	Efapel	+ 22"
3	Alberto Gallego (ESP)	Rádio Popular–Boavista	+ 35"
4	Amets Txurruka (ESP)	Caja Rural–Seguros RGA	+ 1' 02"
5	Pablo Torres (ESP)	Burgos BH	+ 1' 02"
6	Javier Moreno (ESP)	Movistar Team	+ 1' 02"
7	Marcos García (ESP)	Louletano–Ray Just Energy	+ 1' 02"
8	Joni Brandão (POR)	Efapel	+ 1' 02"
9	David Arroyo (ESP)	Caja Rural–Seguros RGA	+ 1' 02"
10	Dmitri Sokolov (RUS)	Lokosphinx	+ 1' 05"

=== Points classification ===
Final points classification
Rank	Rider	Team	Points
1	Evgeny Shalunov (RUS)	Lokosphinx	25
2	Carlos Barbero (ESP)	Caja Rural–Seguros RGA	25
3	Amets Txurruka (ESP)	Caja Rural–Seguros RGA	23
4	Diego Rubio (ESP)	Efapel	21
5	Enrique Sanz (ESP)	Movistar Team	20
6	Alberto Gallego (ESP)	Rádio Popular–Boavista	16
7	Pablo Torres (ESP)	Burgos BH	16
8	Adrián González (ESP)	Murias Taldea	16
9	Samuel Caldeira (POR)	W52–Quinta da Lixa	14
10	Javier Moreno (ESP)	Movistar Team	13

=== Mountains classification ===
Final mountains classification
Rank	Rider	Team	Points
1	Eduard Prades (ESP)	Caja Rural–Seguros RGA	19
2	Evgeny Shalunov (RUS)	Lokosphinx	15
3	Diego Rubio (ESP)	Efapel	10
4	Joaquim Silva (POR)	W52–Quinta da Lixa	6
5	Sandro Pinto (POR)	Louletano–Ray Just Energy	5
6	Nuno Bico (POR)	Rádio Popular–Boavista	5
7	Pablo Torres (ESP)	Burgos BH	3
8	Garikoitz Bravo (ESP)	Murias Taldea	3
9	Mikel Bizkarra (ESP)	Murias Taldea	3
10	Hernâni Brôco (POR)	LA Alumínios–Antarte	3

=== Sprints classification ===
Final sprints classification
Rank	Rider	Team	Points
1	Hugo Sabido (POR)	Louletano–Ray Just Energy	8
2	Winner Anacona (COL)	Movistar Team	3
3	Marc Soler (ESP)	Movistar Team	3
4	Ricardo Ferreira (POR)	Rádio Popular–Boavista	3
5	Diego Rubio (ESP)	Efapel	2
6	Adrián González (ESP)	Murias Taldea	2
7	Joaquim Silva (POR)	W52–Quinta da Lixa	1
8	Nacho Pérez (ESP)	W52–Quinta da Lixa	1
9	Antonio Molina (ESP)	Caja Rural–Seguros RGA	1

=== Young rider classification ===
Final young rider classification
Rank	Rider	Team	Time
1	Alexey Rybalkin (RUS)	Lokosphinx	7h 11' 16"
2	Nuno Bico (POR)	Rádio Popular–Boavista	+ 4"
3	Sergey Vdovin (RUS)	Lokosphinx	+ 8' 34"
4	Imanol Estévez (ESP)	Murias Taldea	+ 10' 08"
5	Marc Soler (ESP)	Movistar Team	+ 12' 20"
6	Alexander Vdovin (RUS)	Lokosphinx	+ 24' 18"

=== Teams classification ===
Final teams classification
Rank	Team	Time
1	Lokosphinx	21h 30' 53"
2	Efapel	+ 4"
3	Caja Rural–Seguros RGA	+ 1' 17"
4	Rádio Popular–Boavista	+ 1' 45"
5	Movistar Team	+ 2' 29"
6	W52–Quinta da Lixa	+ 10' 42"
7	Louletano–Ray Just Energy	+ 11' 01"
8	Burgos BH	+ 13' 02"
9	LA Alumínios–Antarte	+ 23' 01"
10	Murias Taldea	+ 23' 05"
