= Alberto Gallego =

Alberto Gallego may refer to:

- Alberto Gallego (footballer) (born 1974), Spanish football manager and former footballer
- Alberto Gallego (cyclist) (born 1990), Spanish cyclist
