= Marcos García =

Spanish road racing cyclist

Personal information
- Full name: Marcos García Fernández
- Born: 4 December 1986 (age 39) San Martín de Valdeiglesias, Spain
- Height: 1.72 m (5 ft 8 in)
- Weight: 63 kg (139 lb; 9.9 st)

Cycling career
- Sport: Cycling
- Current team: Retired
- Discipline: Road
- Role: Rider
- Rider type: Climber

Amateur teams
- 2006–2007: Super Froiz
- 2008: Karpin–Galicia (stagiaire)

Professional teams
- 2009–2010: Xacobeo–Galicia
- 2011: KTM–Murcia
- 2012–2014: Caja Rural
- 2015: Louletano–Ray Just Energy
- 2016–2022: Kinan Cycling Team

Marcos García Fernández (born 4 December 1986) is a Spanish former road bicycle racer, who competed as a professional from 2009 to 2022.

== Career ==
Born in San Martín de Valdeiglesias, García has competed as a professional since the start of the 2009 season, riding as a member of the Xacobeo–Galicia and KTM–Murcia squads before joining Caja Rural for the 2012 season. On the fourth stage of the 2012 Vuelta a España, he put on a great performance by finishing fourth of the mountain stage, taking first place of his group. He exulted on the finish line, throwing kisses to the crowd; he thought he had won, but he had not, as three escapees had crossed the line before him.

He has competed in four Grand Tours: three Vuelta a Españas and a Giro d'Italia.

== Major results ==
2006
1st Stage 6 Vuelta a Palencia
2007
1st Overall Vuelta a Ávila

1st Stage 2

1st Stage 4 Vuelta a Palencia
3rd Overall Bizkaiko Bira
2008
1st Overall Bizkaiko Bira
3rd Circuito Deputación de Pontevedra
2010
2nd Gran Premio de Llodio
3rd Vuelta a La Rioja
7th Overall Tour of Slovenia
7th Subida al Naranco
2011
3rd Gran Premio de Llodio
9th Road race, National Road Championships
2013
6th Vuelta a la Comunidad de Madrid
8th La Roue Tourangelle
9th Prueba Villafranca de Ordizia
10th Overall Vuelta a Asturias
2014
2nd Overall Vuelta a Castilla y León
9th Giro dell'Emilia
2015
4th Overall Vuelta a Asturias
7th Overall Vuelta a la Comunidad de Madrid
10th Clássica Loulé
2016
2nd Overall Tour of Japan
3rd Oita Cycle Road Race
7th Overall Tour de Singkarak
10th Overall Tour de Kumano
2017
1st Overall Tour de Hokkaido

1st Stage 3

1st Stage 7 Tour of Japan
3rd Overall Tour de Kumano
2018
1st Overall Tour of Japan

1st Stage 6

8th Overall Tour de Kumano
2019
1st Overall Tour of Peninsular

1st Mountains classification
1st Stage 4

1st Mountains classification Tour de Kumano
2nd Overall Tour of Thailand
10th Overall Tour de Ijen
2021
10th Road Race, National Road Championships
2022
3rd Overall Tour de Taiwan
7th Overall Tour de Hokkaido
