= Pablo Torres (cyclist, born 1987) =

Spanish cyclist

Personal information
- Full name: Pablo Torres Muiño
- Born: 27 November 1989 (age 36) Cambre, Spain
- Height: 1.74 m (5 ft 9 in)
- Weight: 63 kg (139 lb)

Cycling career
- Sport: Cycling
- Current team: Retired
- Discipline: Road
- Role: Rider

Amateur team
- 2006–2011: Caja Rural amateur

Professional teams
- 2010: Xacobeo–Galicia (stagiaire)
- 2012–2018: Burgos BH–Castilla y Leon
- 2019: Interpro Cycling Academy
- 2020: Hincapie–Leomo p/b BMC

Pablo Torres Muiño (born 27 November 1987 in Cambre) is a Spanish former cyclist, who competed as a professional from 2012 to 2020. He competed in the 2018 Vuelta a España.

== Major results ==
2005
2nd Road race, National Junior Road Championships
2013
6th Overall Tour of China II
2015
1st Sprints classification Vuelta a Asturias
5th Overall Vuelta a la Comunidad de Madrid
8th Overall Tour de Gironde
2016
6th Circuito de Getxo
7th Overall Tour de Gironde
10th Overall Vuelta a la Comunidad de Madrid
2017
1st Overall Tour de Gironde

1st Points classification
1st Stage 2

8th Overall Troféu Joaquim Agostinho
10th Overall Ronde de l'Oise
10th Prueba Villafranca de Ordizia
2018
7th Overall Vuelta a la Comunidad de Madrid
2019
1st Stage 7 Tour of Japan

=== Grand Tour general classification results timeline ===
Grand Tour	2018
Giro d'Italia	—
Tour de France	—
Vuelta a España	129

Legend
—	Did not compete
DNF	Did not finish
