= Shalunov =

Shalunov (Russian: Шалунов) is a Russian masculine surname, its feminine counterpart is Shalunova. Notable people with the surname include:

- Evgeny Shalunov (born 1992), Russian bicycle racer
- Maxim Shalunov (born 1993), Russian ice hockey player
