= 2013 Clásica de Almería =

Race details
- Dates: 24 February 2013
- Stages: 1
- Distance: 182.3 km (113.3 mi)
- Winning time: 4h 30' 14"

Results
	Winner	Mark Renshaw (AUS)
	Second	Reinardt Janse van Rensburg (RSA)
	Third	Francesco Lasca (ITA)

The 2013 Clásica de Almería was the 28th edition of the Clásica de Almería cycle race and was held on 24 February 2013. The race started in Roquetas de Mar and finished in Almería. The race was won by Mark Renshaw.

== General classification ==
Final general classification

Rank	Rider	Time
1	Mark Renshaw (AUS)	4h 30' 14"
2	Reinardt Janse van Rensburg (RSA)	+ 0"
3	Francesco Lasca (ITA)	+ 0"
4	Juan José Lobato (ESP)	+ 0"
5	Stéphane Poulhies (FRA)	+ 0"
6	Francisco Ventoso (ESP)	+ 0"
7	Bartłomiej Matysiak (POL)	+ 0"
8	Dennis Vanendert (BEL)	+ 0"
9	Fabien Schmidt (FRA)	+ 0"
10	Pim Ligthart (NED)	+ 0"
