= 2013 Tour of the Basque Country =

2013 UCI World Tour, race 9 of 28
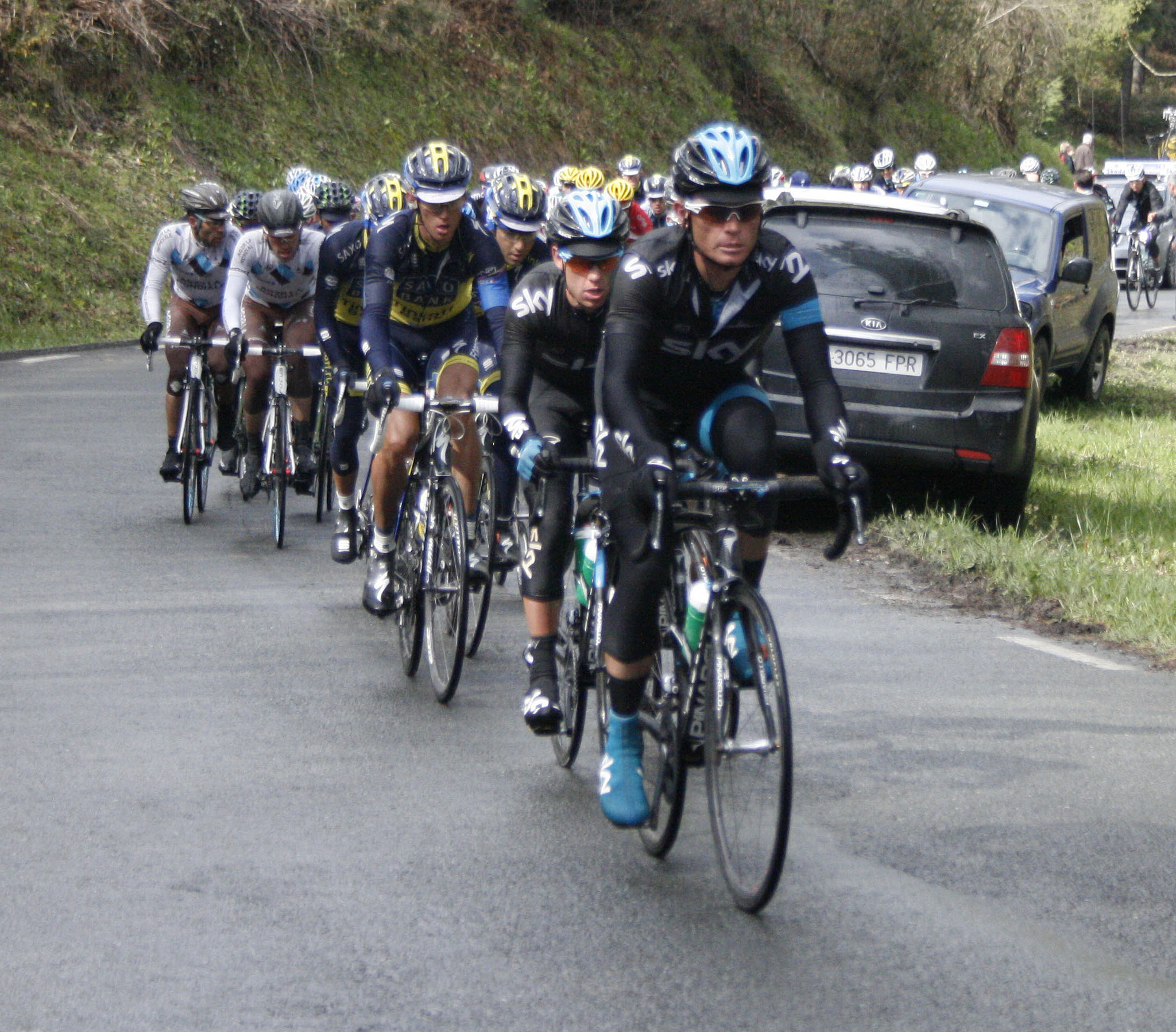
- Tour of the Basque Country 2013, Stage 5

Race details
- Dates: 1–6 April 2013
- Stages: 6
- Distance: 833.1 km (517.7 mi)
- Winning time: 21h 39' 35"

Results
| Jersey awarded to the overall winner | Winner | Nairo Quintana (Colombia) | (Movistar Team) |
| | Second | Richie Porte (Australia) | (Team Sky) |
| | Third | Sergio Henao (Colombia) | (Team Sky) |
| Jersey awarded to the points classification winner | Points | Nairo Quintana (Colombia) | (Movistar Team) |
| Jersey awarded to the mountains classification winner | Mountains | Amets Txurruka (Spain) | (Caja Rural–Seguros RGA) |
| Jersey awarded to the sprints classification winner | Sprints | Amets Txurruka (Spain) | (Caja Rural–Seguros RGA) |
| | Team | Movistar Team | |

The 2013 Tour of the Basque Country was the 53rd running of the Tour of the Basque Country cycling stage race. It started on 1 April in Elgoibar and ended on 6 April in Beasain, and consisted of six stages, including a race-concluding individual time trial. It was the ninth race of the 2013 UCI World Tour season.

The race was won by Colombia's Nairo Quintana of the Movistar Team, after gaining enough time on the final time trial stage to move ahead of the previous race leader Sergio Henao of Team Sky. Quintana – the winner of the race's queen stage, the fourth stage, to Eibar–Arrate – had trailed by six seconds going into the stage, but overturned this disadvantage to eventually win the race by 23 seconds over Henao's teammate Richie Porte. Quintana also won the points classification on the final stage, surpassing Henao in that competition also. Porte, winner of the fifth stage, had started the stage in third place but also overhauled Henao, who eventually finished the race third. Third stage winner Henao finished the race 11 seconds down on Porte, and 34 down on his countryman Quintana.

The race's other jerseys both went to Caja Rural–Seguros RGA rider Amets Txurruka; having featured in the opening stage breakaway, Txurruka led the mountains and sprints classifications from start to finish, taking home the red and white polka dot and orange jerseys respectively. The teams classification was won by the Movistar Team, after placing Beñat Intxausti inside the top ten overall as well as Quintana.

== Teams ==
As the Tour of the Basque Country was a UCI World Tour event, all UCI ProTeams were invited automatically and obligated to send a squad. Originally, eighteen ProTeams were scheduled to be invited to the race, with two other squads – Caja Rural–Seguros RGA and Cofidis – given wildcard places, and as such, would have formed the event's 20-team peloton. Team Katusha subsequently regained their ProTour status after an appeal to the Court of Arbitration for Sport. With Team Katusha not originally invited to the race, race organisers announced their inclusion to the race, bringing the total number of teams competing to twenty-one.

The 21 teams that competed in the race were:

- Ag2r–La Mondiale
- Argos–Shimano
- Astana
- Blanco Pro Cycling
- BMC Racing Team
- Caja Rural–Seguros RGA
- Cannondale
- Cofidis
- Euskaltel–Euskadi
- FDJ
- Garmin–Sharp
- Team Katusha
- Lampre–Merida
- Lotto–Belisol
- Movistar Team
- Omega Pharma–Quick-Step
- Orica–GreenEDGE
- RadioShack–Leopard
- Saxo–Tinkoff
- Team Sky
- Vacansoleil–DCM

Among the 164-rider start list – each team entered eight riders with the exception of Argos–Shimano and Blanco Pro Cycling, who entered seven, and Team Sky, who entered six – were four previous winners of the race. 2000 and 2011 winner Andreas Klöden was part of the RadioShack–Leopard squad, and 2007 victor Juan José Cobo was part of the Movistar Team for the race. Another double winner from previous years, Alberto Contador – who won in 2008 and 2009 – was the team leader for Saxo–Tinkoff, while Samuel Sánchez looked to defend his title at the race with Euskaltel–Euskadi, having won the race in the final time trial in 2012.

== Stages ==
=== Stage 1 ===
1 April 2013 — Elgoibar to Elgoibar, 156.5 km (97.2 mi)

The opening stage of the 2013 Tour of the Basque Country was expected to be one of two chances for sprinters to be prevail over the course of the race as the stage itself was lumpy on a circuit in and around Elgoibar. During the 156.5 km (97.2 mi) parcours, there were a total of six categorised climbs, including the first-category Alto de Azurki at an average gradient of 7.8%, although the steepest of the six climbs preceded the Alto de Azurki, as the Alto de Endoia averaged 9.6% over its duration. The final climb of the Alto de San Miguel summited out with 7.5 km (4.7 mi) remaining before the finish in Elgoibar. There were also three intermediate sprint points in the second half of the stage in Elgoibar itself, Berriatua and in Markina.

After an initial seven-rider move got away early in the stage, the day's primary breakaway was a pair of riders, with Basque rider Amets Txurruka of the Caja Rural–Seguros RGA team being joined by RadioShack–Leopard's Laurent Didier on the day's first categorised climb, the second-category Alto de Asensio. The duo went across the summit with an advantage of around two-and-a-half minutes, before reaching a maximum of around 5' 15" at one point during the stage. Thereafter, it was left to Saxo–Tinkoff to initiate the chase, doing the majority of the pacing before Blanco Pro Cycling, Astana and Euskaltel–Euskadi took over as the stage neared its conclusion. Txurruka left Didier behind on the penultimate climb, the Alto de Kalbario, pulling over a minute clear as the peloton bore down and ultimately caught Didier.

Saxo–Tinkoff had picked up the front of the peloton once again, as they continued to reduce the advantage that Txurruka held, and was caught with around 18 km (11.2 mi) remaining, prior to the day's final climb. The Movistar Team took up the pace on the climb itself, looking to protect their leader Nairo Quintana, attempting to shell riders out of the back of the peloton. Towards the summit of the climb, several riders crashed – including Lotto–Belisol's Jurgen Van den Broeck, and Omega Pharma–Quick-Step duo Tony Martin and Dries Devenyns; the latter abandoned with a fractured radial bone in his left arm – and as a result, the peloton split into several groups. At the front was a group of seventeen riders including favourites Alberto Contador of Saxo–Tinkoff, Quintana, Team Sky's Richie Porte and Tejay van Garderen of the BMC Racing Team. After a lead-out from teammate Pieter Weening, Simon Gerrans sprinted to his third stage victory of the year ahead of a fast-finishing Peter Velits of Omega Pharma–Quick-Step.

Stage 1 Result

| | Rider | Team | Time |
|---|---|---|---|
| 1 | Simon Gerrans (AUS) | Orica–GreenEDGE | 4h 06' 33" |
| 2 | Peter Velits (SVK) | Omega Pharma–Quick-Step | s.t. |
| 3 | Ángel Vicioso (ESP) | Team Katusha | s.t. |
| 4 | Francesco Gavazzi (ITA) | Astana | s.t. |
| 5 | Jakob Fuglsang (DEN) | Astana | s.t. |
| 6 | Sergio Henao (COL) | Team Sky | s.t. |
| 7 | Alberto Contador (ESP) | Saxo–Tinkoff | s.t. |
| 8 | Richie Porte (AUS) | Team Sky | s.t. |
| 9 | Nairo Quintana (COL) | Movistar Team | s.t. |
| 10 | Pieter Weening (NED) | Orica–GreenEDGE | s.t. |

General Classification after Stage 1

| | Rider | Team | Time |
|---|---|---|---|
| 1 | Simon Gerrans (AUS) | Orica–GreenEDGE | 4h 06' 33" |
| 2 | Peter Velits (SVK) | Omega Pharma–Quick-Step | + 0" |
| 3 | Ángel Vicioso (ESP) | Team Katusha | + 0" |
| 4 | Francesco Gavazzi (ITA) | Astana | + 0" |
| 5 | Jakob Fuglsang (DEN) | Astana | + 0" |
| 6 | Sergio Henao (COL) | Team Sky | + 0" |
| 7 | Alberto Contador (ESP) | Saxo–Tinkoff | + 0" |
| 8 | Richie Porte (AUS) | Team Sky | + 0" |
| 9 | Nairo Quintana (COL) | Movistar Team | + 0" |
| 10 | Pieter Weening (NED) | Orica–GreenEDGE | + 0" |

=== Stage 2 ===
2 April 2013 — Elgoibar to Vitoria-Gasteiz, 170.2 km (105.8 mi)

The second stage of the race was seen as the most likely to end in a sprint finish out of the five mass-start stages in the 2013 edition. Although there were five categorised climbs during its 170.2 km (105.8 mi) itinerary, including two second-category climbs inside the opening 50 km (31.1 mi) of the stage – the second of these, the Alto de Gatzaga, averaging a gradient of 10.8% – the gradients of the three third-category climbs late in the stage were not expected to cause major damage in the peloton. Vitoria-Gasteiz was hosting a stage finish of the Tour of the Basque Country for the second year in succession; in 2012, Daryl Impey won the second stage after attacking inside the final kilometre for the GreenEDGE team, and managed to hold off a fast-finishing main field, led home by teammate Allan Davis.

Caja Rural–Seguros RGA's home rider Amets Txurruka played a part in the breakaway for the second day in a row, although on this occasion, he had no other riders to collaborate with the pacing off the front. Txurruka, in the red and white polka-dot jersey as mountains classification leader, attacked prior to the day's first categorised climb, the Alto de Elgeta, commencing over 130 km (80.8 mi) at the front of the race, solo. Txurruka's maximum lead over the rest of the field came on the descent from the Alto de Gatzaga, reaching around five-and-a-half minutes. Txurruka extended his lead in both the mountains and sprints classifications as Orica–GreenEDGE moved to the front of the peloton, and started the chase of Txurruka in earnest. On the Alto de San Martin, Jens Voigt (RadioShack–Leopard) and Lampre–Merida's Adriano Malori attacked from the peloton, and after around 5 km (3.1 mi) of chasing, caught up to Txurruka. The three riders were eventually caught one-by-one on the run-in to Vitoria-Gasteiz, setting up the final sprint, and with a lead-out from race leader Simon Gerrans and teammate Michael Matthews, Impey repeated his 2012 victory ahead of Astana's Francesco Gavazzi; Gavazzi's second top-four finish allowed him to take the race lead from Gerrans.

Stage 2 Result

| | Rider | Team | Time |
|---|---|---|---|
| 1 | Daryl Impey (RSA) | Orica–GreenEDGE | 4h 23' 31" |
| 2 | Francesco Gavazzi (ITA) | Astana | s.t. |
| 3 | Ángel Vicioso (ESP) | Team Katusha | s.t. |
| 4 | Daniele Ratto (ITA) | Cannondale | s.t. |
| 5 | Dennis Vanendert (BEL) | Lotto–Belisol | s.t. |
| 6 | Michel Kreder (NED) | Garmin–Sharp | s.t. |
| 7 | Daniele Pietropolli (ITA) | Lampre–Merida | s.t. |
| 8 | Egoitz García (ESP) | Cofidis | s.t. |
| 9 | Maciej Paterski (POL) | Cannondale | s.t. |
| 10 | Peter Velits (SVK) | Omega Pharma–Quick-Step | s.t. |

General Classification after Stage 2

| | Rider | Team | Time |
|---|---|---|---|
| 1 | Francesco Gavazzi (ITA) | Astana | 8h 30' 04" |
| 2 | Ángel Vicioso (ESP) | Team Katusha | + 0" |
| 3 | Peter Velits (SVK) | Omega Pharma–Quick-Step | + 0" |
| 4 | Jakob Fuglsang (DEN) | Astana | + 0" |
| 5 | Nairo Quintana (COL) | Movistar Team | + 0" |
| 6 | Sergio Henao (COL) | Team Sky | + 0" |
| 7 | Simon Gerrans (AUS) | Orica–GreenEDGE | + 0" |
| 8 | Richie Porte (AUS) | Team Sky | + 0" |
| 9 | Rui Costa (POR) | Movistar Team | + 0" |
| 10 | Tejay van Garderen (USA) | BMC Racing Team | + 0" |

=== Stage 3 ===
3 April 2013 — Vitoria-Gasteiz to Trapagaran, 164.7 km (102.3 mi)

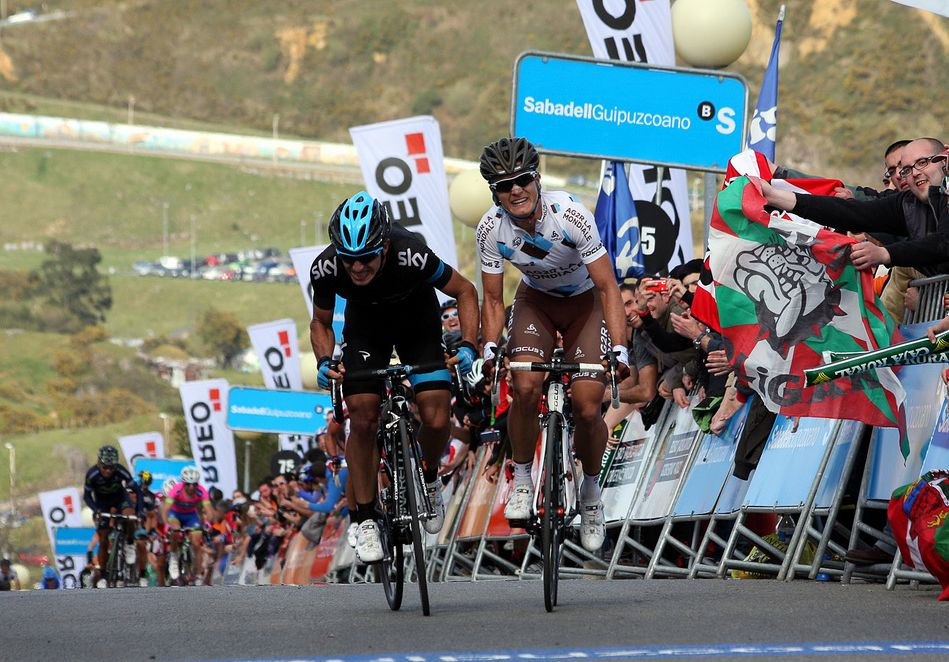
Colombian riders Sergio Henao (Team Sky) and Carlos Betancur (Ag2r–La Mondiale) sprinting for victory on the final climb of the stage

Moving away from the sprinter-friendly finishes of the opening two days, the third stage again included five categorised climbs over the 164.7 km (102.3 mi) parcours, with two second-category climbs – the Alto de la Reineta and the finishing climb of La Lejana – being the most testing of the day's race. La Lejana also incorporated a steep kick to the finish line in Trapagaran; the final 475 metres (1,558 ft) of the stage was to be completed on roads averaging a gradient of around 21%, although the climb as a whole, averaged only 5.7%. As a result of this, it was expected that the first major time gaps would come into play for the remainder of the race, and that the overall race contenders would be looking to gain some time ahead the following two mountain stages, and the final day time trial. The race remained together for most of the opening hour, with several moves being shut down before the riders could establish any legitimate gap from the main field.

Continuing his perfect record of being in the stage breakaway every day, Amets Txurruka (Caja Rural–Seguros RGA) had company out front – unlike his second stage solo attack – as he was joined by teammate Omar Fraile, Daniel Navarro of Cofidis, Euskaltel–Euskadi's Mikel Landa and Romain Bardet of the Ag2r–La Mondiale team. The quintet's lead reached a maximum of around five-and-a-half minutes during the stage, before the advantage was steadily reduced after that point. Txurruka continued to extend his advantages in both the sprints and mountains classifications; he led across all three intermediate sprint points – in Amurrio, Trapagaran itself, and Muskiz – and four of the five categorised climbs. The leaders were eventually brought back to the peloton with around 10 km (6.2 mi) remaining.

At the foot of the climb, Saxo–Tinkoff made their way to the front of the peloton with Nicolas Roche and Chris Anker Sørensen leading their train, protecting their leader Alberto Contador. After Vacansoleil–DCM's Wout Poels had an attack quickly negated by the Movistar Team, José Herrada picked up the lead of the group and set about shelling riders from the back of the group due to exhaustion. Colombian riders were prominent in the group; after Sergio Henao (Team Sky) had attacked, been joined by Herrada's teammate Nairo Quintana and had been brought back, Ag2r–La Mondiale's Carlos Betancur went on the attack with 3 km (1.9 mi) remaining and was joined by Team Katusha rider Giampaolo Caruso. Betancur and Caruso remained clear into the closing stages when they were joined by Henao, who had attacked from a thirty-rider group. Caruso faded on the closing straight as Henao and Betancur went shoulder-to-shoulder in the closing sprint; Henao crossed the line first for his second win of the season, ahead of Betancur, who had raised his arm in protest at the finish, feeling that Henao had pushed him against the barrier. Henao's victory also allowed him to take the lead of both the points classification, and more importantly, the race lead overall.

Stage 3 Result

| | Rider | Team | Time |
|---|---|---|---|
| 1 | Sergio Henao (COL) | Team Sky | 3h 54' 22" |
| 2 | Carlos Betancur (COL) | Ag2r–La Mondiale | s.t. |
| 3 | Giampaolo Caruso (ITA) | Team Katusha | + 5" |
| 4 | Nairo Quintana (COL) | Movistar Team | + 8" |
| 5 | Diego Ulissi (ITA) | Lampre–Merida | + 10" |
| 6 | Richie Porte (AUS) | Team Sky | + 10" |
| 7 | Alberto Contador (ESP) | Saxo–Tinkoff | + 10" |
| 8 | Simon Špilak (SLO) | Team Katusha | + 10" |
| 9 | Igor Antón (ESP) | Euskaltel–Euskadi | + 16" |
| 10 | Samuel Sánchez (ESP) | Euskaltel–Euskadi | + 21" |

General Classification after Stage 3

| | Rider | Team | Time |
|---|---|---|---|
| 1 | Sergio Henao (COL) | Team Sky | 12h 24' 26" |
| 2 | Nairo Quintana (COL) | Movistar Team | + 8" |
| 3 | Richie Porte (AUS) | Team Sky | + 10" |
| 4 | Alberto Contador (ESP) | Saxo–Tinkoff | + 10" |
| 5 | Giampaolo Caruso (ITA) | Team Katusha | + 10" |
| 6 | Simon Špilak (SLO) | Team Katusha | + 10" |
| 7 | Jakob Fuglsang (DEN) | Astana | + 21" |
| 8 | Pieter Weening (NED) | Orica–GreenEDGE | + 21" |
| 9 | José Herrada (ESP) | Movistar Team | + 21" |
| 10 | Carlos Betancur (COL) | Ag2r–La Mondiale | + 21" |

=== Stage 4 ===
4 April 2013 — Trapagaran to Eibar–Arrate, 151.6 km (94.2 mi)

For the fifth successive year, the Tour of the Basque Country included a stage finish in Eibar-Arrate, including the punchy climb of the first-category Alto de Usartza, an ascent with an average gradient of 6.7%, but with gradient in places at over 11%. The climb itself levelled out with 1.4 km (0.9 mi) remaining of the stage, before a slight downhill run to the finish. The Alto de Usartza was the fifth and final climb of the day's 151.6 km (94.2 mi) itinerary, starting in the previous day's finishing town of Trapagaran; the only other climb that was not rated as second-category, was the first-category Alto de Ixua, which was the day's steepest climb, averaging over 10%, and summiting with around 35 km (21.7 mi) remaining. Although not in top form, Euskaltel–Euskadi's Samuel Sánchez was seen as the stage favourite, having won the previous three finishes at Eibar-Arrate in the Tour of the Basque Country. It was also seen as the queen stage of the race.

Much like the previous day, the race remained together for most of the opening hour, after several mini-breaks were negated before they could establish a reputable gap over the main field. The breakaway was formed after around 45 km (28.0 mi), with five riders making headway; the highest-placed of the riders was Peter Velits of Omega Pharma–Quick-Step – who had finished second to Orica–GreenEDGE's Simon Gerrans on the opening stage of the race – as he trailed the overnight leader Sergio Henao (Team Sky) by less than two minutes. Despite this, the lead quintet's maximum advantage reached over five minutes before it was steadily dwindled after that. With Team Sky on the front of the peloton, the lead group of three – after Team Katusha's Eduard Vorganov and Rein Taaramäe of Cofidis had been dropped – reached the final climb with a lead of around two minutes.

As the leaders made their way up the climb, Cannondale's Daniele Ratto fell into difficulty remaining with Velits and the other member of the breakaway, Ag2r–La Mondiale's Matteo Montaguti. The Movistar Team's José Herrada was first to move from the peloton, with Pieter Weening (Orica–GreenEDGE) and Vorganov's teammate Simon Špilak joining him, and the trio caught the two leaders with around 4 km (2.5 mi) remaining. Špilak soon left them behind and gained a small gap over the rest, before they closed him down towards the top of the climb. This group remained together into the final kilometre as a chase group, led by Sánchez, was failing to make contact. Nairo Quintana (Movistar Team) attacked in the closing stages, and held on to win by two seconds from Henao and Saxo–Tinkoff's Alberto Contador; Quintana reduced Henao's overall lead to six seconds, with three riders four seconds further back.

Stage 4 Result

| | Rider | Team | Time |
|---|---|---|---|
| 1 | Nairo Quintana (COL) | Movistar Team | 3h 58' 52" |
| 2 | Sergio Henao (COL) | Team Sky | + 2" |
| 3 | Alberto Contador (ESP) | Saxo–Tinkoff | + 2" |
| 4 | Carlos Betancur (COL) | Ag2r–La Mondiale | + 2" |
| 5 | Simon Špilak (SLO) | Team Katusha | + 2" |
| 6 | Richie Porte (AUS) | Team Sky | + 2" |
| 7 | Jean-Christophe Péraud (FRA) | Ag2r–La Mondiale | + 2" |
| 8 | Pieter Weening (NED) | Orica–GreenEDGE | + 16" |
| 9 | Samuel Sánchez (ESP) | Euskaltel–Euskadi | + 23" |
| 10 | Alberto Losada (ESP) | Team Katusha | + 24" |

General Classification after Stage 4

| | Rider | Team | Time |
|---|---|---|---|
| 1 | Sergio Henao (COL) | Team Sky | 16h 23' 20" |
| 2 | Nairo Quintana (COL) | Movistar Team | + 6" |
| 3 | Richie Porte (AUS) | Team Sky | + 10" |
| 4 | Alberto Contador (ESP) | Saxo–Tinkoff | + 10" |
| 5 | Simon Špilak (SLO) | Team Katusha | + 10" |
| 6 | Carlos Betancur (COL) | Ag2r–La Mondiale | + 21" |
| 7 | Jean-Christophe Péraud (FRA) | Ag2r–La Mondiale | + 26" |
| 8 | Pieter Weening (NED) | Orica–GreenEDGE | + 35" |
| 9 | Giampaolo Caruso (ITA) | Team Katusha | + 35" |
| 10 | Samuel Sánchez (ESP) | Euskaltel–Euskadi | + 47" |

=== Stage 5 ===
5 April 2013 — Eibar to Beasain, 166.1 km (103.2 mi)

The penultimate stage was seen as the race's most difficult day of climbing, although was not considered as prestigious as the previous day's queen stage to Eibar–Arrate. Over the course of the 166.1 km (103.2 mi) parcours, there were a total of ten categorised climbs, the last of which – the second-category Alto de Olaberria, a steep climb with an average gradient of 12.3%, with a gradient in places reaching 16% – came just 5.8 km (3.6 mi) away from the finish of the stage in Beasain. The Alto de Olaberria was climbed three times in total during the stage, while another climb – the third-category Alto de Gabiria – was summited on two occasions. Weather conditions also made riding for the peloton more difficult, with rain and sleet falling throughout.

A three-rider move got away in the early stages, consisting of Blanco Pro Cycling's Lars Petter Nordhaug, Jérôme Pineau of Omega Pharma–Quick-Step and Argos–Shimano rider Thierry Hupond, but they were brought back before the first climb, the Alto de Azkarate. Extending his lead in the mountains classification was Amets Txurruka (Caja Rural–Seguros RGA), as he crossed the summit first. The field remained together until the second climb where Egor Silin of Astana, and the Movistar Team's José Herrada got clear on the first-category Alto de Urraki. The group soon expanded to an eventual ten-rider maximum, and formed the stage's primary breakaway, however with several prime candidates for the race overall in the group, the gap never broke two minutes to the peloton. Txurruka's teammate Omar Fraile also joined them later in the stage, and soon attacked on his own with around 40 km (24.9 mi) remaining.

Team Sky were manning the front of the peloton, protecting team leader Richie Porte and the race leader Sergio Henao from any potential dangers on the roads. They had reduced Fraile's advantage to around a minute with 20 km (12.4 mi) remaining, at the top of the Alto de Barbaris. Fraile was eventually caught towards the top of the Alto de Olaberria; defending race winner Samuel Sánchez (Euskaltel–Euskadi) twice counter-attacked on the descent from the climb, but both moves were covered off by Team Sky. Porte and Sánchez soon broke clear on the descent for a period, but were brought back to the main group. Porte attacked again with around 1.2 km (0.7 mi) remaining, and soloed away to victory by four seconds ahead of Sánchez and Henao. Porte's victory moved him to six seconds behind Henao, ahead of the final time trial in Beasain.

Stage 5 Result

| | Rider | Team | Time |
|---|---|---|---|
| 1 | Richie Porte (AUS) | Team Sky | 4h 40' 43" |
| 2 | Samuel Sánchez (ESP) | Euskaltel–Euskadi | + 4" |
| 3 | Sergio Henao (COL) | Team Sky | + 4" |
| 4 | Nairo Quintana (COL) | Movistar Team | + 4" |
| 5 | Pieter Weening (NED) | Orica–GreenEDGE | + 4" |
| 6 | John Gadret (FRA) | Ag2r–La Mondiale | + 4" |
| 7 | Alberto Contador (ESP) | Saxo–Tinkoff | + 4" |
| 8 | Simon Špilak (SLO) | Team Katusha | + 4" |
| 9 | Diego Ulissi (ITA) | Lampre–Merida | + 20" |
| 10 | Giampaolo Caruso (ITA) | Team Katusha | + 20" |

General Classification after Stage 5

| | Rider | Team | Time |
|---|---|---|---|
| 1 | Sergio Henao (COL) | Team Sky | 21h 04' 07" |
| 2 | Nairo Quintana (COL) | Movistar Team | + 6" |
| 3 | Richie Porte (AUS) | Team Sky | + 6" |
| 4 | Alberto Contador (ESP) | Saxo–Tinkoff | + 10" |
| 5 | Simon Špilak (SLO) | Team Katusha | + 10" |
| 6 | Pieter Weening (NED) | Orica–GreenEDGE | + 35" |
| 7 | Carlos Betancur (COL) | Ag2r–La Mondiale | + 37" |
| 8 | Samuel Sánchez (ESP) | Euskaltel–Euskadi | + 47" |
| 9 | Giampaolo Caruso (ITA) | Team Katusha | + 51" |
| 10 | Diego Ulissi (ITA) | Lampre–Merida | + 1' 03" |

=== Stage 6 ===
6 April 2013 — Beasain, 24 km (14.9 mi), individual time trial (ITT)

The final stage of the Tour of the Basque Country ended like it had done so for the past decade with a technical time trial in and around the town of Beasain. Over the 24 km (14.9 mi) parcours, there were three steep climbs averaging 6.9%, 7.3% and 12.1%, with the last of the trio coming with around 5 km (3.1 mi) remaining of the stage. As was customary of time trial stages, cyclists set off in reverse order from where they were ranked in the general classification at the end of the previous stage. The previous day's stage resulted in around half of the peloton pulling out of the race, due to the conditions. Thus, Michael Albasini of Orica–GreenEDGE, who, in 73rd place, trailed overall leader Sergio Henao of Team Sky by fifty-five minutes and twenty-nine seconds, was the first rider to set off on the final stage.

Albasini was not the first rider to reach the line however, as he was passed by Laurent Didier (RadioShack–Leopard) on the stage, with Didier setting the first benchmark of 38' 51". He was closely followed by Ag2r–La Mondiale's Christophe Riblon – who also passed Albasini on the stage – who recorded a time some 50 seconds quicker than Albasini. Egor Silin (Astana) was the first rider beneath 38 minutes on the course with a 37' 24", but that was obliterated by the world time trial champion Tony Martin of the Omega Pharma–Quick-Step squad, who managed to complete the course in a time of 35' 05", 2' 19" quicker than Silin's time. It would eventually be good enough to win the stage, with no other rider getting within fifteen seconds of his time; it was his third individual time trial win of 2013 – all coming on the final stage of races – after previous wins at the Volta ao Algarve and Tirreno–Adriatico. He also passed four riders during his stage-winning run to the finish, a performance which left him "satisfied".

The focus then shifted to the overall race battle, with five riders – Henao, Nairo Quintana (Movistar Team), Henao's teammate Richie Porte, Saxo–Tinkoff's Alberto Contador and Simon Špilak of Team Katusha – heading into the stage separated by only ten seconds. Špilak set the target time for the four riders behind him to chase, recording the third-fastest time at that point with a 35' 53" for the course. Contador was much slower than his rival, taking the course in a steady manner, and crossed the finish line nineteen seconds in arrears of Špilak. The rain was not making for easy riding; at the intermediate time-check, Quintana was coping best with the conditions, pulling ten seconds on Porte and seventeen on Henao. Porte eventually displaced Špilak from third place, going eight seconds quicker than him, but his chances for the overall slipped away, as Quintana took twenty-three seconds out of him, recording a time of 35' 22". Henao tried his best to hold on to the win, but crossed the line forty seconds down on Quintana, giving Quintana his first World Tour win. Porte moved ahead of his teammate for second place, while Henao placed third by one solitary second ahead of Špilak.

Stage 6 Result

| | Rider | Team | Time |
|---|---|---|---|
| 1 | Tony Martin (GER) | Omega Pharma–Quick-Step | 35' 05" |
| 2 | Nairo Quintana (COL) | Movistar Team | + 17" |
| 3 | Beñat Intxausti (ESP) | Movistar Team | + 32" |
| 4 | Richie Porte (AUS) | Team Sky | + 40" |
| 5 | Simon Špilak (SLO) | Team Katusha | + 48" |
| 6 | Jean-Christophe Péraud (FRA) | Ag2r–La Mondiale | + 51" |
| 7 | Sergio Henao (COL) | Team Sky | + 57" |
| 8 | Carlos Betancur (COL) | Ag2r–La Mondiale | + 1' 05" |
| 9 | Pieter Weening (NED) | Orica–GreenEDGE | + 1' 06" |
| 10 | Alberto Contador (ESP) | Saxo–Tinkoff | + 1' 07" |

Final General Classification

| | Rider | Team | Time |
|---|---|---|---|
| 1 | Nairo Quintana (COL) | Movistar Team | 21h 39' 35" |
| 2 | Richie Porte (AUS) | Team Sky | + 23" |
| 3 | Sergio Henao (COL) | Team Sky | + 34" |
| 4 | Simon Špilak (SLO) | Team Katusha | + 35" |
| 5 | Alberto Contador (ESP) | Saxo–Tinkoff | + 54" |
| 6 | Pieter Weening (NED) | Orica–GreenEDGE | + 1' 18" |
| 7 | Carlos Betancur (COL) | Ag2r–La Mondiale | + 1' 19" |
| 8 | Beñat Intxausti (ESP) | Movistar Team | + 1' 57" |
| 9 | Wout Poels (NED) | Vacansoleil–DCM | + 2' 47" |
| 10 | John Gadret (FRA) | Ag2r–La Mondiale | + 2' 56" |

== Classification leadership table ==
In the 2013 Tour of the Basque Country, four different jerseys were awarded. For the general classification, calculated by adding each cyclist's finishing times on each stage, the leader received a yellow jersey. This classification was considered the most important of the 2013 Tour of the Basque Country, and the winner of the classification was considered the winner of the race.

Additionally, there was a points classification, which awarded a white jersey. In the points classification, cyclists received points for finishing in the top 15 in a stage. For winning a stage, a rider earned 25 points, second place earned 20 points, third 16, fourth 14, fifth 12, sixth 10, and one point fewer per place down to a single point for 15th. There was also a mountains classification, the leadership of which was marked by a red jersey with white dots. In the mountains classification, points were won by reaching the top of a climb before other cyclists, with more points available for the higher-categorised climbs.

The fourth jersey represented the sprints classification, marked by an orange jersey. In the sprints classification, cyclists received points for finishing in the top 3 at intermediate sprint points during each stage, with the exception of the final individual time trial stage. There was also a classification for teams, in which the times of the best three cyclists per team on each stage were added together; the leading team at the end of the race was the team with the lowest total time.

| Stage | Winner | General Classification | Points Classification | Mountains Classification | Sprints Classification | Team Classification |
|---|---|---|---|---|---|---|
| 1 | Simon Gerrans | Simon Gerrans | Simon Gerrans | Amets Txurruka | Amets Txurruka | Astana |
| 2 | Daryl Impey | Francesco Gavazzi | Francesco Gavazzi | Amets Txurruka | Amets Txurruka | Astana |
| 3 | Sergio Henao | Sergio Henao | Sergio Henao | Amets Txurruka | Amets Txurruka | Movistar Team |
| 4 | Nairo Quintana | Sergio Henao | Sergio Henao | Amets Txurruka | Amets Txurruka | Team Katusha |
| 5 | Richie Porte | Sergio Henao | Sergio Henao | Amets Txurruka | Amets Txurruka | Movistar Team |
| 6 | Tony Martin | Nairo Quintana | Nairo Quintana | Amets Txurruka | Amets Txurruka | Movistar Team |
| Final | | Nairo Quintana | Nairo Quintana | Amets Txurruka | Amets Txurruka | Movistar Team |
