= 2015 Vuelta a Asturias =

2015 UCI Europe Tour

Race details
- Dates: 2–3 May 2015
- Stages: 2
- Distance: 319.5 km (198.5 mi)
- Winning time: 8h 51' 56"

Results
Jersey awarded to the overall winner	Winner	Igor Antón (ESP)	(Movistar Team)
	Second	Amets Txurruka (ESP)	(Caja Rural–Seguros RGA)
	Third	Jesús Herrada (ESP)	(Movistar Team)
Jersey awarded to the points classification winner	Points	Jesús Herrada (ESP)	(Movistar Team)
Jersey awarded to the mountains classification winner	Mountains	Rodolfo Torres (COL)	(Colombia)
Jersey awarded to the sprints classification winner	Sprints	Pablo Torres (ESP)	(Burgos BH)
	Team	Movistar Team	

The 2015 Vuelta a Asturias was the 58th edition of the Vuelta a Asturias cycling stage race. It was the first edition since 2013, as the race did not take place in 2014 due to financial issues. The race was rated as a 2.1 event as part of the 2015 UCI Europe Tour. The race included two stages: it started on 2 May with a stage from Oviedo to Pola de Lena and finished on 3 May with a stage that started in Soto de Ribera and then finished back in Oviedo. The defending champion was Amets Txurruka (Caja Rural–Seguros RGA).

The race was won by Igor Antón (Movistar Team), who took a solo victory on the first stage then finished in the lead group on the second stage to secure victory by 12 seconds.

== Schedule ==
The race included two road stages on consecutive days.

Stage	Date	Course	Distance	Type	Winner
1	2 May	Oviedo to Pola de Lena	143.5 km (89.2 mi)	Medium-mountain stage	Igor Antón (ESP)
2	3 May	Ribera de Arriba to Oviedo	176 km (109 mi)	Medium-mountain stage	Jesús Herrada (ESP)
Total		319.5 km (198.5 mi)			

== Stages ==
=== Stage 1 ===
2 May 2015 – Oviedo to Pola de Lena, 143.5 km (89.2 mi)

Stage 1 result
Rank	Rider	Team	Time
1	Igor Antón (ESP)	Movistar Team	4h 18' 15"
2	Amets Txurruka (ESP)	Caja Rural–Seguros RGA	+ 14"
3	Jesús Herrada (ESP)	Movistar Team	+ 29"
4	Marcos García (ESP)	Louletano–Ray Just Energy	+ 36"
5	Javier Moreno (ESP)	Movistar Team	+ 36"
6	Garikoitz Bravo (ESP)	Murias Taldea	+ 36"
7	David Belda (ESP)	Burgos BH	+ 36"
8	Evgeny Shalunov (RUS)	Lokosphinx	+ 1' 04"
9	Alberto Gallego (ESP)	Rádio Popular–Boavista	+ 1' 04"
10	Rodolfo Torres (COL)	Colombia	+ 1' 04"

General classification after stage 1
Rank	Rider	Team	Time
1	Igor Antón (ESP)	Movistar Team	4h 18' 05"
2	Amets Txurruka (ESP)	Caja Rural–Seguros RGA	+ 18"
3	Jesús Herrada (ESP)	Movistar Team	+ 33"
4	Marcos García (ESP)	Louletano–Ray Just Energy	+ 46"
5	Javier Moreno (ESP)	Movistar Team	+ 46"
6	Garikoitz Bravo (ESP)	Murias Taldea	+ 46"
7	David Belda (ESP)	Burgos BH	+ 46"
8	Evgeny Shalunov (RUS)	Lokosphinx	+ 1' 14"
9	Alberto Gallego (ESP)	Rádio Popular–Boavista	+ 1' 14"
10	Rodolfo Torres (COL)	Colombia	+ 1' 14"

=== Stage 2 ===
3 May 2015 – Ribera de Arriba to Oviedo, 176 km (109 mi)

Stage 2 result
Rank	Rider	Team	Time
1	Jesús Herrada (ESP)	Movistar Team	4h 33' 51"
2	Amets Txurruka (ESP)	Caja Rural–Seguros RGA	+ 0"
3	Ion Izagirre (ESP)	Movistar Team	+ 0"
4	Rubén Fernández (ESP)	Movistar Team	+ 0"
5	Igor Antón (ESP)	Movistar Team	+ 0"
6	Omar Fraile (ESP)	Caja Rural–Seguros RGA	+ 8"
7	Marcos García (ESP)	Louletano–Ray Just Energy	+ 25"
8	Evgeny Shalunov (RUS)	Lokosphinx	+ 25"
9	Ángel Madrazo (ESP)	Caja Rural–Seguros RGA	+ 25"
10	Francisco Mancebo (ESP)	Skydive Dubai–Al Ahli	+ 25"

Final general classification
Rank	Rider	Team	Time
1	Igor Antón (ESP)	Movistar Team	8h 51' 56"
2	Amets Txurruka (ESP)	Caja Rural–Seguros RGA	+ 12"
3	Jesús Herrada (ESP)	Movistar Team	+ 25"
4	Marcos García (ESP)	Louletano–Ray Just Energy	+ 1' 11"
5	Garikoitz Bravo (ESP)	Murias Taldea	+ 1' 15"
6	Evgeny Shalunov (RUS)	Lokosphinx	+ 1' 39"
7	Rodolfo Torres (COL)	Colombia	+ 1' 43"
8	Alberto Gallego (ESP)	Rádio Popular–Boavista	+ 1' 43"
9	Javier Moreno (ESP)	Movistar Team	+ 2' 48"
10	Omar Fraile (ESP)	Caja Rural–Seguros RGA	+ 4' 01"

== Classification leadership table ==
The race included four principal classifications, the leaders of which wore jerseys. The leader in the general classification wore a blue jersey; the leader in the points classification wore an orange jersey; the leader in the mountains classification wore a white jersey and the leader of the intermediate sprints classification wore a black and white jersey.

Stage	Winner	General classification	Points classification	Mountains classification	Sprints classification	Teams classification
1	Igor Antón	Igor Antón	Igor Antón	Rodolfo Torres	Jesús del Pino	Movistar Team
2	Jesús Herrada	Igor Antón	Jesús Herrada	Rodolfo Torres	Pablo Torres	Movistar Team
Final		Igor Antón	Jesús Herrada	Rodolfo Torres	Pablo Torres	Movistar Team
