= 2008 Vuelta a Andalucía =

Race details
- Dates: 17–21 February 2008
- Stages: 5
- Distance: 802.8 km (498.8 mi)
- Winning time: 20h 33' 15"

Results
| | Winner | Pablo Lastras (ESP) |
| | Second | Clément Lhotellerie (FRA) |
| | Third | Cadel Evans (AUS) |

The 2008 Vuelta a Andalucía was the 54th edition of the Vuelta a Andalucía cycle race and was held on 17 February to 21 February 2008. The race started in Benahavís and finished in Córdoba. The race was won by Pablo Lastras.

== General classification ==
Final general classification

| Rank | Rider | Time |
|---|---|---|
| 1 | Pablo Lastras (ESP) | 20h 33' 15" |
| 2 | Clément Lhotellerie (FRA) | + 48" |
| 3 | Cadel Evans (AUS) | + 1' 32" |
| 4 | Mikel Astarloza (ESP) | + 1' 36" |
| 5 | Juan Manuel Gárate (ESP) | + 1' 41" |
| 6 | Alberto Losada (ESP) | + 1' 45" |
| 7 | Mario Aerts (BEL) | + 1' 55" |
| 8 | Iban Mayoz (ESP) | + 2' 01" |
| 9 | Juan Antonio Flecha (ESP) | + 2' 08" |
| 10 | Bram Tankink (NED) | + 2' 11" |
