= Jesús Herrada =

Spanish cyclist

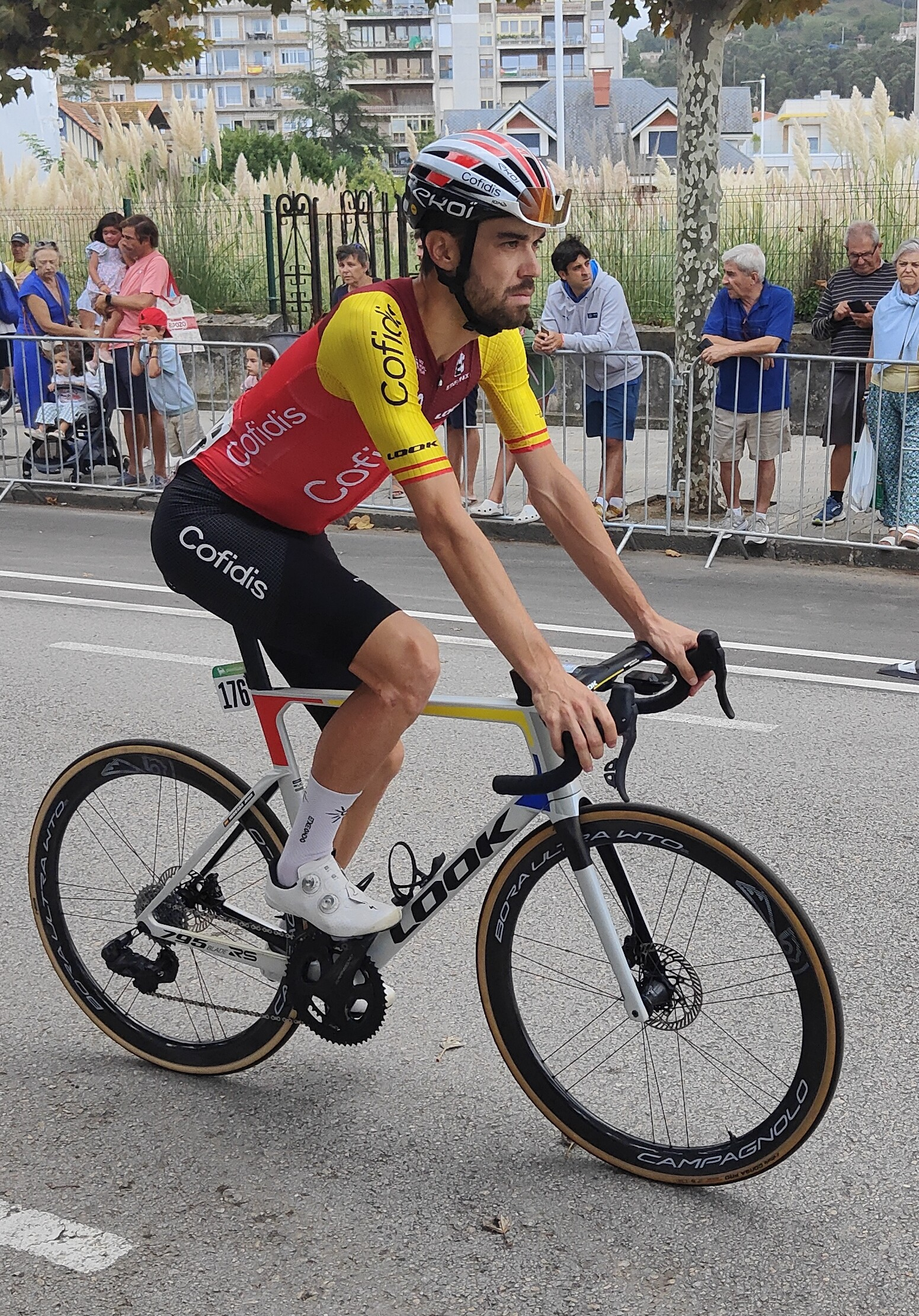
- Herrada at the 2025 Vuelta a España

Personal information
- Full name: Jesús Herrada López
- Born: 26 July 1990 (age 36) Mota del Cuervo, Spain
- Height: 1.83 m (6 ft 0 in)
- Weight: 72 kg (159 lb; 11 st 5 lb)

Cycling career
- Sport: Cycling
- Current team: Burgos Burpellet BH
- Discipline: Road
- Role: Rider
- Rider type: Climber

Amateur teams
- 2009: ECP Continental
- 2010: Caja Rural amateur

Professional teams
- 2011–2017: Movistar Team
- 2018–2025: Cofidis
- 2026–: Burgos Burpellet BH

Major wins
- Grand Tours Vuelta a España 3 individual stages (2019, 2022, 2023) Stage races Tour de Luxembourg (2019) One-day races and Classics National Road Race Championships (2013, 2017)

Jesús Herrada López (born 26 July 1990) is a Spanish professional cyclist, who currently rides for UCI ProTeam Burgos Burpellet BH. His brother José Herrada is also a professional cyclist, who retired after the 2023 season.

== Career ==
He was considered one of the most promising young talents in Spanish cycling, having won the National Junior Time Trial Championships in 2007 and 2008, the Under-23 National Time Trial Championships in 2010, and the Spanish National Road Race Championships in 2013. He has the key statistics of 15 wins with 9 Grand tours and 18 classics.

On 3 May 2015, Herrada won the second and last stage of the Vuelta a Asturias. He did so while helping his leader Igor Antón to a general classification victory. He finished fourth in the men's road race at the 2015 European Games in Baku, after giving a lead-out to the winner Luis León Sánchez. In June 2015, he won a bronze medal at the Spanish National Time Trial Championships and a bronze medal in the Spanish National Road Race Championships.

== Major results ==
2007
1st Time trial, National Junior Road Championships
2008
1st Time trial, National Junior Road Championships
1st Stage 1 Tour d'Istrie
1st Stage 4 Vuelta al Besaya
2010
1st Time trial, National Under-23 Road Championships
6th Time trial, UEC European Under-23 Road Championships
8th Time trial, UCI Under-23 Road World Championships
2011
National Road Championships

3rd Road race
4th Time trial

5th Overall Vuelta a la Comunidad de Madrid
2012 (1 pro win)
1st Stage 2a Vuelta a Asturias
2013 (2)
1st Road race, National Road Championships
2nd Overall Tour du Poitou-Charentes

1st Young rider classification
1st Sprints classification
1st Stage 5

5th Prueba Villafranca de Ordizia
2014 (2)
1st Stage 1 Route du Sud
4th Road race, National Road Championships
9th Overall Circuit de la Sarthe
9th Overall Tour de Romandie

1st Young rider classification

9th Overall Tour du Poitou-Charentes

1st Young rider classification
1st Stage 5

2015 (2)
2nd Overall Tour du Limousin

1st Stage 2

National Road Championships

3rd Road race
3rd Time trial

3rd Overall Vuelta a Asturias

1st Points classification
1st Stage 2

European Games

4th Road race
9th Time trial

5th Vuelta a La Rioja
8th Overall Vuelta a Burgos
2016 (1)
1st Stage 2 Critérium du Dauphiné
2nd Overall Tour du Haut Var
2nd Overall Vuelta a la Comunidad de Madrid
National Road Championships

4th Time trial
5th Road race

8th Overall Volta a la Comunitat Valenciana
2017 (1)
National Road Championships

1st Road race
3rd Time trial

2nd Grand Prix Cycliste de Montréal
9th Overall Tour de Romandie
10th Klasika Primavera
2018
4th Road race, UEC European Road Championships
4th Overall Tour of Oman
4th Grand Prix La Marseillaise
5th Overall Volta a la Comunitat Valenciana
6th Grand Prix de Plumelec-Morbihan
8th Boucles de l'Aulne
Vuelta a España

Held after Stages 12–13
Combativity award Stage 20

2019 (6)
1st Overall Tour de Luxembourg

1st Points classification
1st Stages 3 & 4

1st Mont Ventoux Dénivelé Challenge
1st Trofeo Campos, Porreres, Felanitx, Ses Salines
Vuelta a España

1st Stage 6
Combativity award Stage 6

2nd Grand Prix de Plumelec-Morbihan
3rd Road race, National Road Championships
3rd Overall Tour of Oman
5th Trofeo Andratx–Lloseta
6th Overall Volta a la Comunitat Valenciana
2020
4th Grand Prix La Marseillaise
9th Overall Tour de la Provence
9th Overall Tour de l'Ain
9th Mont Ventoux Dénivelé Challenge
2021 (1)
1st Trofeo Serra de Tramuntana
2nd Road race, National Road Championships
2nd Overall Route d'Occitanie
4th Trofeo Andratx–Mirador d'Es Colomer
8th Overall Tour de Luxembourg
8th GP Miguel Induráin
9th Overall Tour de la Provence
2022 (2)
1st Classic Grand Besançon Doubs
Vuelta a España

1st Stage 7
Combativity award Stage 7

2nd Road race, National Road Championships
2nd Tour du Jura
2nd Boucles de l'Aulne
3rd Overall Route d'Occitanie
4th Tour du Finistère
4th Mercan'Tour Classic
7th Circuito de Getxo
9th Overall O Gran Camiño
9th Tre Valli Varesine
2023 (3)
1st Tour du Doubs
Vuelta a España

1st Stage 11
Held after Stages 11–12

2nd Overall O Gran Camiño
4th Road race, National Road Championships
4th Overall Tour du Limousin
5th Tour du Finistère
6th Overall Route d'Occitanie
7th Overall Tour of Oman

1st Stage 2

7th Classic Grand Besançon Doubs
9th Overall Tour de l'Ain
9th Grosser Preis des Kantons Aargau
2024
3rd Road race, National Road Championships
7th Tour du Doubs
2025
2nd Vuelta a Castilla y León
4th Mercan'Tour Classic
5th Overall Route d'Occitanie
2026
3rd Clásica de Pascua
6th Clásica Castilla y León
6th Clásica Terres de l'Ebre
9th Overall O Gran Camiño

=== Grand Tour general classification results timeline ===
Grand Tour	2014	2015	2016	2017	2018	2019	2020	2021	2022	2023	2024	2025	2026
Giro d'Italia	—	74	—	—	—	—	—	—	—	—	—	—	—
Tour de France	61	—	DNF	97	47	20	44	87	—	—	DNF	—	—
Vuelta a España	—	—	—	—	21	DNF	—	38	56	83	85	77	

Legend
—	Did not compete
DNF	Did not finish
IP	In progress
