= 2013 Vuelta a Castilla y León =

Race details
- Dates: 12–14 April 2013
- Stages: 3
- Distance: 542 km (337 mi)
- Winning time: 12h 35' 03"

Results
Jersey awarded to the overall winner	Winner	Rubén Plaza (ESP)	(Movistar Team)
	Second	Francisco Mancebo (ESP)	(5-hour Energy)
	Third	Francesco Lasca (ITA)	(Caja Rural–Seguros RGA)

The 2013 Vuelta a Castilla y León was the 28th edition of the Vuelta a Castilla y León cycle race and was held on April 12 through April 14, 2013. The race started in Arévalo and finished in Cervera de Pisuerga. The race was won by Rubén Plaza.

== General classification ==
Final general classification

Rank	Rider	Time
1	Rubén Plaza (ESP)	12h 35' 03"
2	Francisco Mancebo (ESP)	+ 6"
3	Francesco Lasca (ITA)	+ 9"
4	Pablo Urtasun (ESP)	+ 11"
5	Carlos Barbero (ESP)	+ 13"
6	José Joaquín Rojas (ESP)	+ 21"
7	Evgeny Shalunov (RUS)	+ 21"
8	Fabrice Jeandesboz (FRA)	+ 21"
9	Amets Txurruka (ESP)	+ 21"
10	Sergey Firsanov (RUS)	+ 21"
