= 2013 Vuelta a Asturias =

Race details
- Dates: 11–12 May 2013
- Stages: 2
- Distance: 325.2 km (202.1 mi)
- Winning time: 8h 25' 48"

Results
Jersey awarded to the overall winner	Winner	Amets Txurruka (ESP)	(Caja Rural–Seguros RGA)
	Second	Mikel Landa (ESP)	(Euskaltel–Euskadi)
	Third	Javier Moreno (ESP)	(Movistar Team)
Jersey awarded to the points classification winner	Points	Mikel Landa (ESP)	(Euskaltel–Euskadi)
Jersey awarded to the mountains classification winner	Mountains	David Belda (ESP)	(Burgos BH–Castilla y Leon)
Jersey awarded to the sprints classification winner	Sprints	Jonathan Castroviejo (ESP)	(Louletano–Dunas Douradas)

The 2013 Vuelta a Asturias was the 57th edition of the Vuelta a Asturias road cycling stage race, which was held on 11 and 12 May 2013. The race started in Oviedo and finished at Alto del Naranco. The race was won by Amets Txurruka of the Caja Rural–Seguros RGA team.

== General classification ==
Final general classification

Rank	Rider	Team	Time
1	Amets Txurruka (ESP)	Caja Rural–Seguros RGA	8h 25' 48"
2	Mikel Landa (ESP)	Euskaltel–Euskadi	+ 3"
3	Javier Moreno (ESP)	Movistar Team	+ 4"
4	André Cardoso (POR)	Caja Rural–Seguros RGA	+ 10"
5	Delio Fernández (ESP)	OFM–Quinta da Lixa	+ 14"
6	Arkaitz Durán (ESP)	Efapel–Glassdrive	s.t.
7	Pello Bilbao (ESP)	Euskaltel–Euskadi	s.t.
8	Ever Rivera (COL)	4-72 Colombia	+ 26"
9	Rubén Plaza (ESP)	Movistar Team	+ 27"
10	Marcos García (ESP)	Caja Rural–Seguros RGA	+ 58"
