= Amets Txurruka =

Spanish cyclist

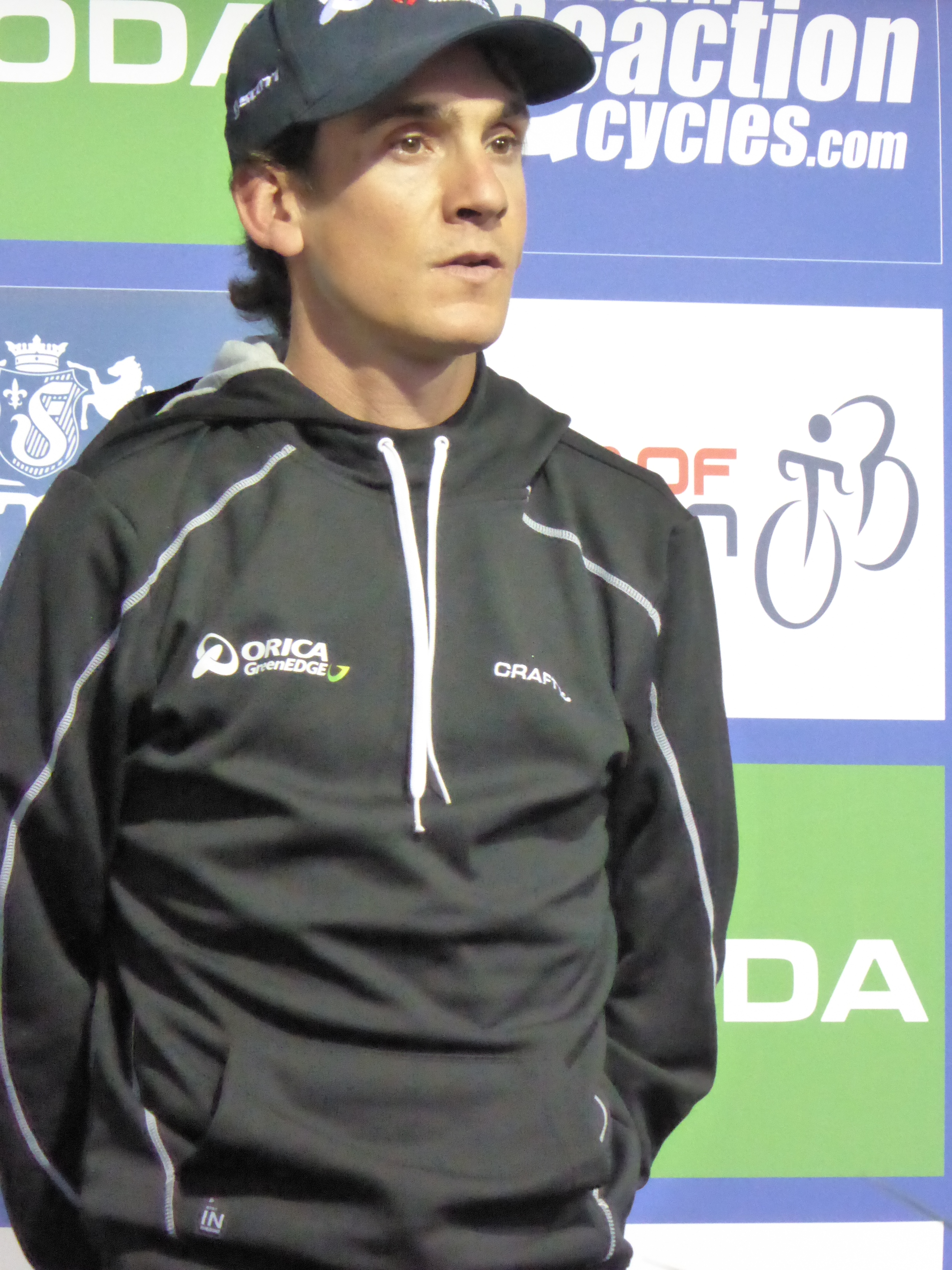
- Txurruka at the 2016 Tour of Britain.

Personal information
- Full name: Amets Txurruka Ansola
- Born: 10 November 1982 (age 43) Etxebarria, Spain
- Height: 1.71 m (5 ft 7 in)
- Weight: 56 kg (123 lb)

Cycling career
- Sport: Cycling
- Current team: Retired
- Discipline: Road
- Role: Rider
- Rider type: Climber; Puncheur

Professional teams
- 2006: Barloworld
- 2007–2012: Euskaltel–Euskadi
- 2013–2015: Caja Rural
- 2016: Orica–GreenEDGE

Major wins
- Grand Tours Tour de France Overall Combativity award (2007) Stage races Vuelta a Asturias (2013) Tour du Gévaudan (2014)

Amets Txurruka Ansola (born 10 November 1982) is a Spanish former professional road bicycle racer, who rode professionally between 2006 and 2016 for the Barloworld, Euskaltel–Euskadi, Caja Rural–Seguros RGA and Orica–BikeExchange teams.

== Career ==
Born in Etxebarria in the Basque Country, Txurruka made his Tour de France debut in 2007, memorably participating (alongside Pierrick Fédrigo) in a breakaway during Stage 12 that was caught just 1 km (0.6 mi) from the finish line. This effort earned him the red back numbers for most combative rider the next day. He was also indirectly benefited when Michael Rasmussen was withdrawn from the Tour; Txurruka was third in the young rider classification, behind Alberto Contador and Mauricio Soler. With Contador wearing the yellow jersey as leader of the general classification because of Rasmussen's withdrawal, and Soler wearing the polka dot jersey as leader of the mountains classification, Txurruka wore the white jersey that is given to the leader of the young rider classification.

He was also chosen as the most combative rider of whole Tour, being the third Spanish rider in a row (after Óscar Pereiro and David de la Fuente) to earn that award.

Txurruka was released by Euskaltel–Euskadi at the end of the 2012 season, and joined Caja Rural for the 2013 season. In the Tour of the Basque Country, Txurruka won both the mountains and sprint classification jerseys after being part of long breakaways for the first three stages. In August 2015 Orica–GreenEDGE announced that they had signed Txurruka on a one-year deal for 2016.

== Major results ==
2005
9th Clásica Memorial Txuma
2006
5th GP Industria & Artigianato di Larciano
8th Overall Vuelta a Asturias
8th Giro d'Oro
9th Overall Euskal Bizikleta
9th Overall Clásica Internacional de Alcobendas
2007
6th Overall Vuelta a La Rioja
Tour de France

Combativity award Stage 12 & Overall

2009
6th Vuelta a La Rioja
8th Overall Vuelta a Asturias
10th Overall Tour de Luxembourg
2011
7th Klasika Primavera
8th Overall Vuelta a la Comunidad de Madrid
Combativity award Stage 13 Vuelta a España
2012
6th Overall Vuelta a Asturias
2013
1st Overall Vuelta a Asturias

1st Stage 1

Tour of the Basque Country

1st Mountains classification
1st Sprints classification

1st Mountains classification, Vuelta a Burgos
5th Vuelta a la Comunidad de Madrid
9th Overall Vuelta a Castilla y León
2014
1st Overall Tour du Gévaudan Languedoc-Roussillon
1st Mountains classification, Tour des Fjords
9th Klasika Primavera
9th Coppa Sabatini
Combativity award Stage 4 Vuelta a España
2015
1st Stage 4 Tour of Norway
2nd Overall Vuelta a Asturias
3rd Prueba Villafranca de Ordizia
4th Overall Tour de Beauce

1st Stage 2

4th Overall Vuelta a la Comunidad de Madrid
4th Philadelphia International Cycling Classic
5th Overall Tour des Fjords

1st Mountains classification

5th Giro dell'Appennino
7th GP Miguel Induráin
10th Grand Prix La Marseillaise
10th Klasika Primavera
10th Circuito de Getxo
Combativity award Stage 7 Vuelta a España

=== Grand Tour general classification results timeline ===
Grand Tour	2007	2008	2009	2010	2011	2012	2013	2014	2015	2016
Giro d'Italia	—	—	—	—	—	42	—	—	—	55
Tour de France	23	52	DNF	DNF	DNF	DNF	—	—	—	—
Vuelta a España	—	45	29	31	30	30	25	48	DNF	—

Legend
—	Did not compete
DNF	Did not finish
