= Ever Rivera =

Colombian cyclist

Personal information
- Full name: Ever Alexander Rivera Guerrero
- Born: December 27, 1991 (age 34) Sapuyes

Cycling career
- Sport: Cycling
- Current team: 4-72 Colombia
- Discipline: Road
- Role: Rider

Professional team
- 2013-: 4-72 Colombia

Ever Alexander Rivera Guerrero (born 27 December 1991 in Sapuyes) is a Colombian cyclist riding for 4-72 Colombia.

== Palmares ==
2010
3rd Colombian National Road Race Championships juniors
2013
3rd Vuelta Ciclista a León
10th Coupe des nations Ville Saguenay

Mountains classification
