= Sapuyes =

Coordinates: 1°2′13″N 77°37′17″W

- Municipality and town
- Location of the municipality and town of Sapuyes in the Nariño Department of Colombia.
- Country: Colombia
- Department: Nariño Department
- Time zone: UTC-5 (Colombia Standard Time)

Sapuyes is a town and municipality in the Nariño Department, Colombia.

== Climate ==
Sapuyes has a cold highland Mediterranean climate (Csb). It has moderate rainfall year-round.

Climate data for Sapuyes (Villa Rosa), elevation 3,000 m (9,800 ft), (1981–2010)
Month	Jan	Feb	Mar	Apr	May	Jun	Jul	Aug	Sep	Oct	Nov	Dec	Year
Mean daily maximum °C (°F)	16.3 (61.3)	16.4 (61.5)	16.4 (61.5)	16.8 (62.2)	16.5 (61.7)	16.3 (61.3)	15.8 (60.4)	15.6 (60.1)	16.3 (61.3)	16.7 (62.1)	16.7 (62.1)	16.6 (61.9)	16.4 (61.5)
Daily mean °C (°F)	11.4 (52.5)	11.6 (52.9)	11.7 (53.1)	11.8 (53.2)	11.8 (53.2)	11.6 (52.9)	10.9 (51.6)	10.6 (51.1)	11.1 (52.0)	11.5 (52.7)	11.5 (52.7)	11.6 (52.9)	11.4 (52.5)
Mean daily minimum °C (°F)	5.8 (42.4)	6.1 (43.0)	6.9 (44.4)	6.9 (44.4)	7.1 (44.8)	6.7 (44.1)	5.9 (42.6)	5.7 (42.3)	5.3 (41.5)	5.9 (42.6)	6.3 (43.3)	6.4 (43.5)	6.2 (43.2)
Average precipitation mm (inches)	82.9 (3.26)	88.7 (3.49)	145.4 (5.72)	135.0 (5.31)	123.8 (4.87)	64.3 (2.53)	41.3 (1.63)	23.6 (0.93)	61.2 (2.41)	113.9 (4.48)	139.8 (5.50)	109.9 (4.33)	1,118 (44.02)
Average precipitation days	18	17	20	20	19	14	14	12	13	18	19	18	200
Average relative humidity (%)	81	81	81	82	82	82	81	81	80	81	83	83	81
Source: Instituto de Hidrologia Meteorologia y Estudios Ambientales
