= Adrián González (cyclist) =

Spanish cyclist

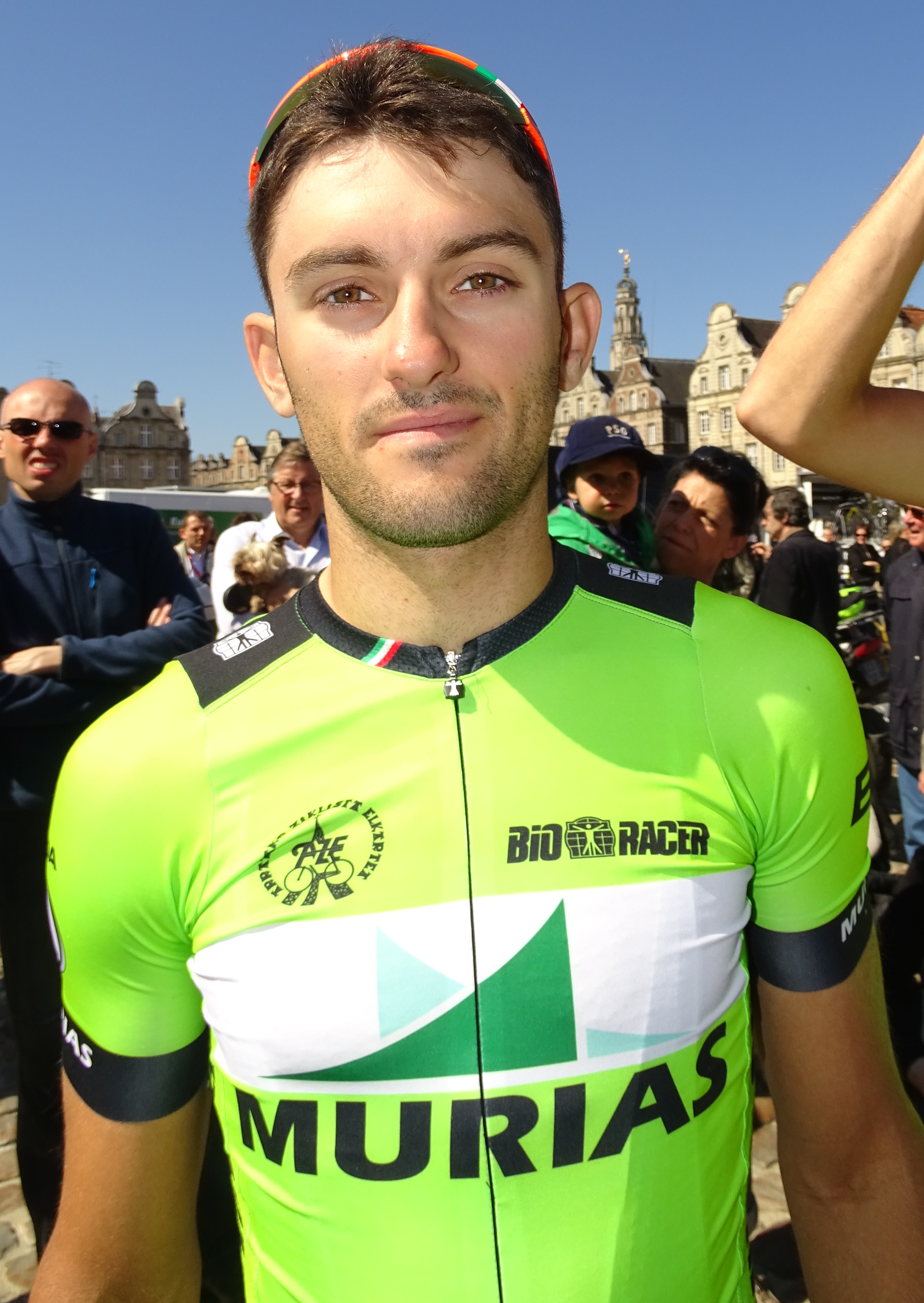
- González in 2015

Personal information
- Full name: Adrián González Velasco
- Born: 13 September 1992 (age 34) Burgos, Spain
- Height: 1.71 m (5 ft 7 in)
- Weight: 63 kg (139 lb)

Cycling career
- Sport: Cycling
- Current team: Retired
- Discipline: Road
- Role: Rider

Amateur team
- 2012–2014: Ibaigane–Opel

Professional teams
- 2015–2017: Murias Taldea
- 2018: Burgos BH

Adrián González Velasco (born 13 September 1992 in Burgos) is a Spanish former professional cyclist, who rode professionally between 2015 and 2018 for the Euskadi Basque Country–Murias and Burgos BH teams.

== Major results ==
2016
10th Boucles de l'Aulne
