= Oleg Chuzhda =

Ukrainian cyclist

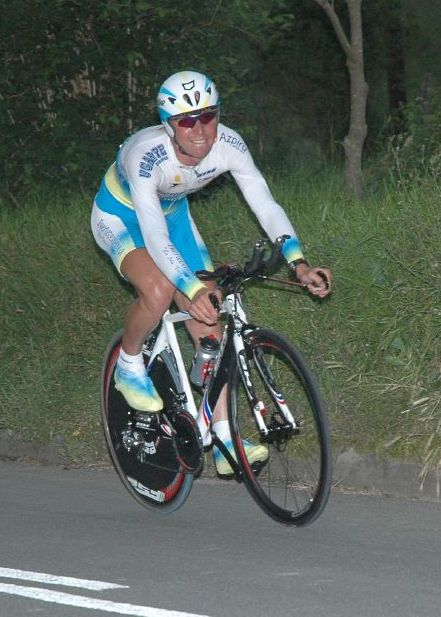

Personal information
- Born: May 8, 1985 (age 41) Canet d'en Berenguer, Spain

Cycling career
- Sport: Cycling
- Current team: Retired
- Discipline: Road
- Role: Rider

Amateur teams
- 2004–2005: Comunidad Valenciana–Kelme Amateur
- 2012 (from 11/06): AA Drink–Leontien.NL
- 2013: Mutua de Levante–Delikia–Cafemax

Professional teams
- 2006: Comunidad Valenciana
- 2007: Fuerteventura–Canarias
- 2008–2009: Contentpolis–Murcia
- 2010–2011: Caja Rural
- 2012 (until 10/06): Accent.jobs–Willems Veranda's

Oleg Chuzhda (Ukrainian: Олег Чужда; born May 8, 1985, in Canet d'en Berenguer) is a Ukrainian former professional road racing cyclist. He is the son of fellow cyclist Oleg Petrovich Chuzhda.

== Major results ==
2005
2nd Overall Vuelta a Segovia

1st stage 3

2008
1st Overall Vuelta a la Comunidad de Madrid
2009
1st Stage 8 Volta a Portugal
2010
1st Stage 1 Volta a Portugal
7th Overall Boucles de la Mayenne
8th Overall Volta ao Alentejo
2011
2nd National Time Trial Championships
6th National Road Race Championships
2012
5th National Time Trial Championships
6th Overall Vuelta Ciclista a León
