= Nacho Pérez =

Spanish footballer

Personal information
- Full name: Nacho Pérez Gómez
- Date of birth: 29 August 2008 (age 18)
- Place of birth: Turís, Spain
- Height: 1.76 m (5 ft 9 in)
- Position: Right-back

Team information
- Current team: Levante
- Number: 29

Youth career
- Turís
- 2014–2016: Valencia
- 2016–2022: Levante
- 2022–2023: Patacona
- 2023–2025: Levante

Senior career*
Years	Team	Apps	(Gls)
2024–2026	Levante B	33	(4)
2025–	Levante	6	(0)

International career
2025–	Spain U17	3	(0)
- * Club domestic league appearances and goals as of 29 August 2026

Nacho Pérez Gómez (born 29 August 2008) is a Spanish professional footballer who plays as a right-back for Levante UD.

== Club career ==
Born in Turís, Valencian Community, Pérez joined Valencia CF's youth sides in 2014, aged six, from hometown side CD Turís. He left the side after two years, and joined the structure of Levante UD.

Pérez made his senior debut with the reserves on 21 December 2024, starting in a 0–0 Tercera Federación away draw against CD Soneja. He scored his first goal the following 5 April, netting the B's second in a 2–0 home win over Crevillente Deportivo, and renewed his contract with the club until 2028 on 5 September 2025.

Pérez made his first team debut on 3 December 2025, coming on as a late substitute for Roger Brugué in a 1–0 away win over CD Cieza, for the season's Copa del Rey. He made his professional debut fourteen days later, starting in a 1–0 away loss to Cultural y Deportiva Leonesa, also for the national cup.

Pérez made his La Liga debut on 15 February 2026, starting in a 2–0 home loss to rivals Valencia CF.

== International career ==
On 15 February 2025, Pérez debuted for the Spain national under-17 team during the Algarve Tournament in Portugal.
