= Alberto Losada =

Spanish road bicycle racer

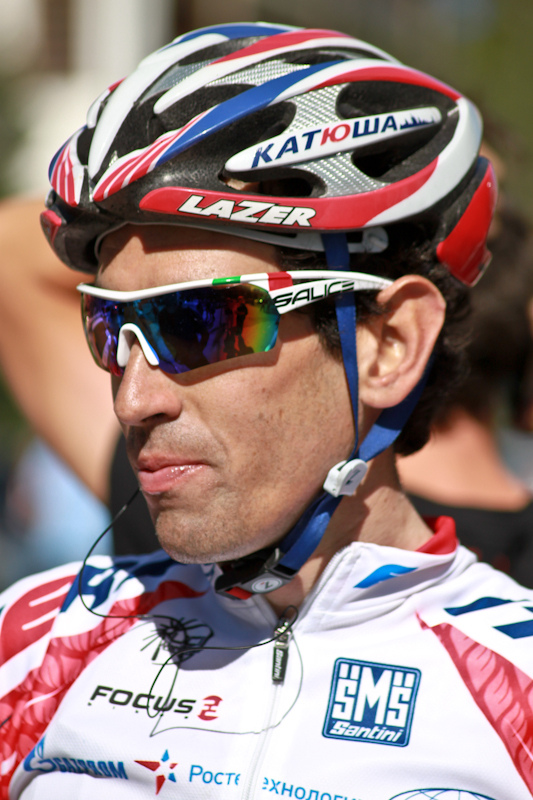
- Losada at the 2011 Giro d'Italia

Personal information
- Full name: Alberto Losada Alguacil
- Nickname: Losly
- Born: 28 February 1982 (age 44) Barcelona, Spain
- Height: 1.80 m (5 ft 11 in)
- Weight: 69 kg (152 lb)

Cycling career
- Sport: Cycling
- Discipline: Road
- Role: Rider
- Rider type: Climber

Professional teams
- 2006: Kaiku
- 2007–2010: Caisse d'Epargne
- 2011–2017: Team Katusha

Alberto Losada Alguacil (born 28 February 1982) is a Spanish former road bicycle racer, who competed professionally between 2006 and 2017 for the Kaiku, Caisse d'Epargne and Team Katusha–Alpecin squads.

== Major results ==
2004
3rd Overall Vuelta a Cantabria
2005
4th Overall Vuelta a Navarra
9th Overall Volta a Lleida
2006
2nd Overall Escalada a Montjuïc
7th Overall Vuelta a La Rioja

1st Young rider classification

10th Overall Rheinland-Pfalz Rundfahrt
10th Gran Premio de Llodio
2007
8th Overall Volta ao Alentejo
9th Overall Vuelta a La Rioja
2008
6th Overall Vuelta a Andalucía
10th Overall Tour de l'Ain
2009
10th Overall Vuelta a Chihuahua
2010
7th Vuelta a La Rioja
2013
8th GP Miguel Induráin
2015
8th Overall Volta ao Algarve

=== Grand Tour general classification results timeline ===
Grand Tour	2007	2008	2009	2010	2011	2012	2013	2014	2015	2016	2017
Giro d'Italia	60	—	—	53	55	54	—	36	—	—	147
Tour de France	—	—	—	—	—	—	109	—	58	67	—
Vuelta a España	—	24	—	—	46	37	DNF	42	31	59	72

Legend
—	Did not compete
DNF	Did not finish
