= Francesco Lasca =

Italian cyclist (born 1988)

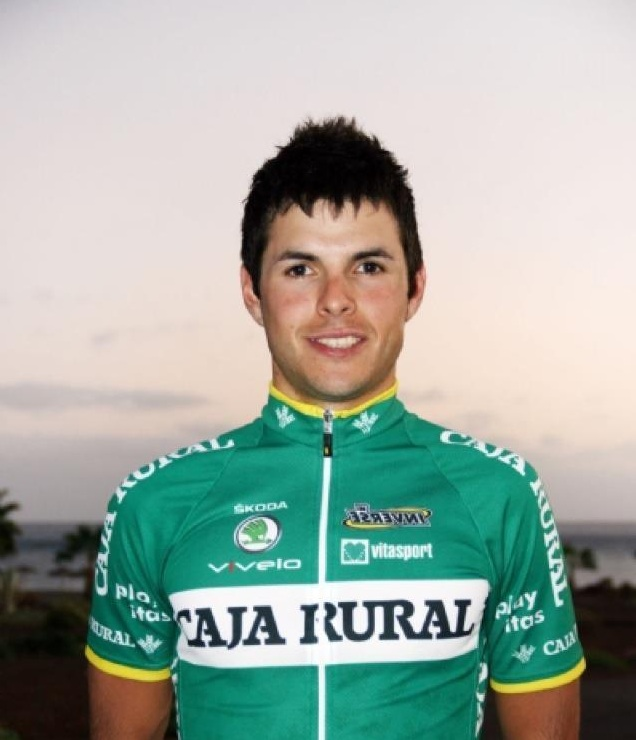

Personal information
- Full name: Francesco Lasca
- Nickname: Paco
- Born: 29 March 1988 (age 38) Osimo, Italy
- Height: 1.80 m (5 ft 11 in)
- Weight: 65 kg (143 lb)

Cycling career
- Sport: Cycling
- Discipline: Road
- Role: Rider
- Rider type: Sprinter

Amateur team
- 2009–2011: Bedogni–Grassi

Professional team
- 2012–2015: Caja Rural

Francesco Lasca (born 29 March 1988) is an Italian former professional road bicycle racer, who rode professionally for UCI Professional Continental Team Caja Rural–Seguros RGA between 2012 and 2015.

== Career ==
Born in Osimo, Lasca competed as a professional from 2012, when he joined the Caja Rural team after five seasons competing domestically for the Bedogni Natalini squad. Lasca achieved his first victory as a professional, by winning the second stage of the Circuit de Lorraine; he won the mass sprint finish in L'Hôpital, beating Steven Tronet of Auber 93 and FDJ–BigMat's Nacer Bouhanni to the line. He also won the second stage of the Volta a Portugal later in the year, beating MTN–Qhubeka rider Reinardt Janse van Rensburg and Saur–Sojasun's Stéphane Poulhies in Trofa. Lasca remained with the team into 2013, taking a third place at the Clásica de Almería, before he became the first Italian winner of the Vuelta a La Rioja race in late March. He achieved his first stage race podium at the Vuelta a Castilla y León, where he finished third overall and was the winner of the points classification.

== Major results ==
2006
1st Stage 3 Giro di Basilicata
2007
1st Trofeo Edilizia Mogetta
2nd Memorial Gigi Pezzoni
2nd GP Fratelli Bagnoli Trigonon
2nd Gran Premio d'Apertura – Città di Pescara
3rd GP Città di Vinci
2008
1st Trofeo di Autunno
2nd Trofeo Cibes
2nd Firenze–Modena
2nd Memorial Benfenati
3rd Coppa Ciuffenna
4th Medaglia d'Oro GS Budriese
4th Coppa Penna
2009
1st Coppa Penna
1st Gran Premio d'Apertura
3rd Trofeo Fosco Frasconi
3rd Memorial Benfenati
3rd Gran Premio della Liberazione
3rd Gran Premio Artigiani e Commercianti
3rd Trofeo delle Colline Capannoresi
4th Trofeo Comune di Lamporecchio
5th Memorial Gigi Pezzoni
6th Trofeo Alvaro Bacci
6th Pistoia–Fiorano
6th Memorial Fratelli Gandolfi
8th Trofeo Città di Montevarchi
2010
2nd Trofeo Città di Montevarchi
2nd GP Città di Vinci
2nd Memorial Gigi Pezzoni
2nd Trofeo Edilizia Mogetta
3rd Coppa Loro Ciuffenna
3rd GP Cuoio e Pelli
3rd Gran Premio Sportivi Poggio alla Cavalla
4th Trofeo Mario Zanchi
6th Gran Premio San Giuseppe
6th Firenze–Empoli
9th Trofeo Colline Capannoresi
2011
1st Gran Premio Vivaisti Cenaiesi
1st Trofeo TV1
1st Coppa Lanciotto Ballerini
2nd Trofeo Gruppo Meccaniche Luciani
3rd Coppa Collecchio
3rd Gran Premio Sportivi Poggio alla Cavalla
4th Coppa del Mobilio
4th Trofeo Fosco Frasconi
4th Trofeo Edilizia Mogetta
5th Trofeo Alessio Pistolesi
5th Gran Premio Pretola
9th Trofeo Comune di Lamporecchio
2012
1st Stage 2 Circuit de Lorraine
1st Stage 2 Volta a Portugal
4th Dwars door Drenthe
7th Grand Prix de Fourmies
8th Cholet-Pays de Loire
10th Memorial Rik Van Steenbergen
2013
1st Vuelta a La Rioja
3rd Overall Vuelta a Castilla y León

1st Points classification

3rd Clásica de Almeria
2014
2nd Vuelta a La Rioja
