= Evgeny Shalunov =

Russian road racing cyclist

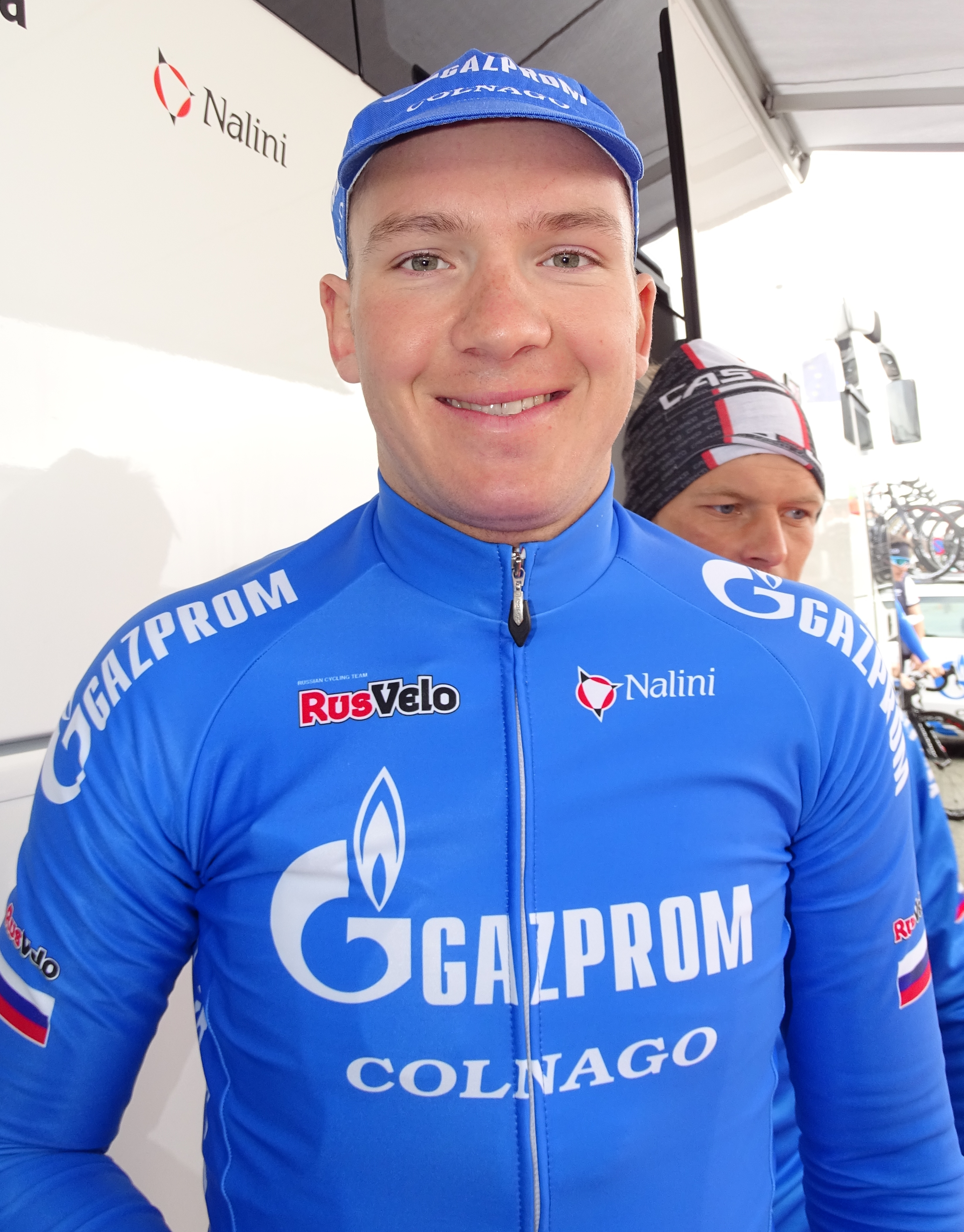
- Shalunov in 2016

Personal information
- Full name: Evgeny Vladimirovich Shalunov; Евгений Владимирович Шалунов
- Born: 8 January 1992 (age 34) Saint Petersburg, Russia
- Height: 1.8 m (5 ft 11 in)
- Weight: 70 kg (154 lb)

Cycling career
- Sport: Cycling
- Current team: Retired
- Disciplines: Road; Track
- Role: Rider

Amateur teams
- 2011: Lokomotiv–Urbycolan
- 2011: Team RadioShack (stagiaire)

Professional teams
- 2012–2015: Lokosphinx
- 2016–2021: Gazprom–RusVelo

Evgeny Vladimirovich Shalunov (Russian: Евгений Владимирович Шалунов; born 8 January 1992) is a Russian former professional road and track bicycle racer.

== Career ==
Shalunov has competed as a professional since the middle of the 2011 season, having signed a stagiaire deal with Team RadioShack in July 2011.

A winner of eight national events in 2011 with Lokomotiv–Urbycolan, Shalunov signed with the Lokosphinx team for the 2012 season. After finishing fourth in the La Roue Tourangelle held in France in March, Shalunov won his first UCI Europe Tour race in April 2012, by winning the Vuelta a La Rioja in Spain. Attacking around 30 km (18.6 mi) from the finish in La Rioja, Shalunov soloed to the finish line to win by 28 seconds ahead of Euskaltel–Euskadi's Pablo Urtasun and teammate Mikhail Antonov.

He was named in the start list for the 2017 Giro d'Italia.

== Major results ==
2010
1st Overall Závod Míru

1st Stages 2 & 4

2nd Individual pursuit, UEC European Junior Track Championships
2nd Overall Vuelta al Besaya

1st Stage 4

2011
1st Overall Bidasoa Itzulia

1st Stages 1 & 3

1st GP Macario
1st Memorial Valenciaga
Volta a Coruña

1st Stages 1 & 3

1st Stage 3 Ronde de l'Isard
2012
1st Vuelta a La Rioja
4th La Roue Tourangelle
2013
7th Overall Vuelta a Castilla y León
7th Gran Premio San Giuseppe
10th Klasika Primavera
2014
1st Gran Premio della Liberazione
4th Ster ZLM Toer
7th Vuelta a La Rioja
2015
1st Overall Vuelta a la Comunidad de Madrid

1st Points classification
1st Stage 1

1st Trofeo Matteotti
2nd Klasika Primavera
6th Overall Vuelta a Asturias
2016
5th Overall Tour de Wallonie
7th Trofeo Matteotti
2017
5th Rund um Köln
2019
2nd Overall Vuelta a Aragón
7th Overall Settimana Internazionale di Coppi e Bartali
7th GP Industria & Artigianato di Larciano
2020
6th Trofeo Laigueglia

=== Grand Tour general classification results timeline ===
Grand Tour	2017
Giro d'Italia	123
Tour de France	—
Vuelta a España	—

Legend
—	Did not compete
DNF	Did not finish
