= Alberto Gallego (cyclist) =

Spanish cyclist

Personal information
- Full name: Alberto Gallego Ruiz
- Born: 25 November 1990 (age 35) Don Benito, Spain
- Height: 1.77 m (5 ft 10 in)
- Weight: 62 kg (137 lb)

Cycling career
- Sport: Cycling
- Discipline: Road
- Role: Rider

Amateur teams
- 2009–2011: Extremadura–Spiuk
- 2012: Andalucía amateur
- 2013–2014: Bicicletas Rodríguez–Extremadura

Professional teams
- 2014–2015: Rádio Popular
- 2016: Caja Rural–Seguros RGA
- 2020–2022: Rádio Popular–Boavista

Alberto Gallego Ruiz (born 25 November 1990) is a Spanish former cyclist, who competed as a professional from 2014 to 2016 and again from 2020 to 2022.

Between January 2016 and October 2019, Gallego served a suspension after a positive drugs test for stanozolol, an androgen and anabolic steroid.

== Major results ==
2014
1st Mountains classification Troféu Joaquim Agostinho
2015
3rd Overall Vuelta a la Comunidad de Madrid
3rd Overall Troféu Joaquim Agostinho
7th Overall Volta ao Alentejo
7th Overall Route du Sud
8th Overall Vuelta a Asturias
