= Imanol Estévez =

Spanish cyclist

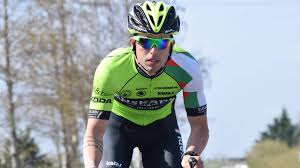
- Imanol Estevez picture

Personal information
- Full name: Imanol Estévez Salas
- Born: 11 January 1993 (age 33) Spain

Cycling career
- Sport: Cycling
- Current team: Retired
- Discipline: Road
- Role: Rider

Amateur teams
- 2012–2013: Naturgas Energía
- 2014: Zirauna–Infisport–Alavanet

Professional team
- 2015–2017: Murias Taldea

Imanol Estévez Salas (born 11 January 1993) is a Spanish former cyclist, who competed professionally between 2015 and 2017 for the Euskadi Basque Country–Murias team.

== Major results ==
2016
1st Stage 1 Volta ao Alentejo
1st Young rider classification GP Liberty Seguros
