= Vuelta a la Comunidad de Madrid =

Spanish multi-day road cycling race

Race details
- Date: Mid July (until 2010); May (since 2011)
- Region: Comunidad de Madrid, Spain
- Local name(s): Vuelta a la Comunidad de Madrid (in Spanish)
- Discipline: Road
- Competition: UCI Europe Tour
- Type: Stage race (until 2012, 2015 onwards); One day race (2013)
- Web site: www.vueltamadrid.com

History
- First edition: 1983
- Editions: 32 (as of 2019)
- First winner: Angel Mayordomo (ESP)
- Most wins: David Plaza (ESP); Javier Díaz (ESP); Antonio López (ESP) (2 wins)
- Most recent: Clément Russo (FRA)

Vuelta a la Comunidad de Madrid is a stage road bicycle race held annually in and around Madrid, Spain. Between 2005 and 2012, the race was organised as a 2.1 event on the UCI Europe Tour. In 2013 the event was organised as a single-day race, for economical reasons.

== Winners ==
Year	Country	Rider	Team
1983	Spain	Angel Mayordomo	
1984	Spain	Anselmo Fuerte	
1985	Spain	Juan Carlos Chouzas	
1986	Spain	Antonio Sampedro	
1987	Spain	Santos Hernández	
1988	No race		
1989	Spain	Torres Herrerias	
1990	Spain	Bernardo González	
1991	Spain	David Plaza	
1992	Spain	Javier Díaz	
1993	Spain	Javier Díaz	
1994	Spain	David Plaza	
1995	Spain	José Luis Rebollo	
1996	Spain	David Navas	
1997	Russia	Vladislav Borisov	
1998	No race		
1999	Spain	Alberto Hierro	
2000	Spain	Sergio Villamil	
2001	No race		
2002	Spain	Carlos Castaño	
2003	Spain	Antonio López	
2004	Spain	Antonio López	
2005	No race		
2006	Spain	Sergi Escobar	Grupo Nicolas Mateos
2007	Spain	Manuel Lloret	Fuerteventura–Canarias
2008	Ukraine	Oleg Chuzhda	Contentpolis–Murcia
2009	Spain	Héctor Guerra	Liberty Seguros
2010	Spain	Sergio Pardilla	Carmiooro NGC
2011	Portugal	Rui Costa	Movistar Team
2012	Russia	Sergey Firsanov	RusVelo
2013	Spain	Javier Moreno	Movistar Team
2014	No race		
2015	Russia	Evgeny Shalunov	Lokosphinx
2016	Spain	Juan José Lobato	Movistar Team
2017	Spain	Óscar Sevilla	Medellín–Inder
2018	Portugal	Edgar Pinto	Vito–Feirense–BlackJack
2019	France	Clément Russo	Arkéa–Samsic
2020– 2021	No race due to the COVID-19 pandemic in Spain		

== Under-23 race ==
A version of the race reserved for riders under 23 years old has been held intermittently since 2008. In 2011 and 2013, the race was part of the UCI Europe Tour as a 2.2U category event.

Year	Winner	Second	Third
2008	(France) Tony Hurel	(Portugal) João Pereira	(Spain) Gorka Izagirre
2009	(Spain) Rubén Martínez	(Russia) Alexander Ryabkin	(Spain) Jesús del Pino
2010	(Argentina) Daniel Díaz	(Spain) Pablo Marcosano	(Colombia) Sebastián Tamayo
2011	(France) Bob Rodriguez	(Belgium) Jimmy Janssens	(Spain) Haritz Orbe
2012	Not held		
2013	(Czech Republic) Petr Vakoč	(Spain) Haritz Orbe	(Spain) Marcos Jurado
2014-2020	Not held		
2021	(Belgium) Elias Maris	(Spain) Xabier Isasa	(Belgium) Robbe Claeys
