= 2011 Vuelta a Burgos =

2010–11 UCI Europe Tour

Race details
- Dates: 3–7 August
- Stages: 5
- Distance: 646.60 km (401.78 mi)
- Winning time: 15h 12' 34"

Results
Jersey awarded to the overall winner	Winner	Joaquim Rodríguez (Spain)	(Team Katusha)
	Second	Daniel Moreno (Spain)	(Team Katusha)
	Third	Juan José Cobo (Spain)	(Geox–TMC)
Jersey awarded to the points classification winner	Points	Joaquim Rodríguez (Spain)	(Team Katusha)
Jersey awarded to the mountains classification winner	Mountains	Mikel Landa (Spain)	(Euskaltel–Euskadi)
Jersey awarded to the sprints classification winner	Sprints	Kenny De Ketele (Belgium)	(Topsport Vlaanderen–Mercator)
	Team	Euskaltel–Euskadi	

The 2011 Vuelta a Burgos (2011 Tour of Burgos) was the 33rd edition of the Vuelta a Burgos, an annual bicycle race which tours the province of Burgos. Beginning in Villarcayo on 3 August, it concluded at the Lagunas de Neila on 7 August. The 646.6 km long stage race was part of the 2010–11 UCI Europe Tour, and was classified as a 2.HC event. Joaquim Rodríguez won the general classification, while his teammate Daniel Moreno secured a 1–2 victory for Team Katusha. Reigning champion Samuel Sánchez participated but finished fourth. Rodríguez also claimed the points classification title.

== Teams ==
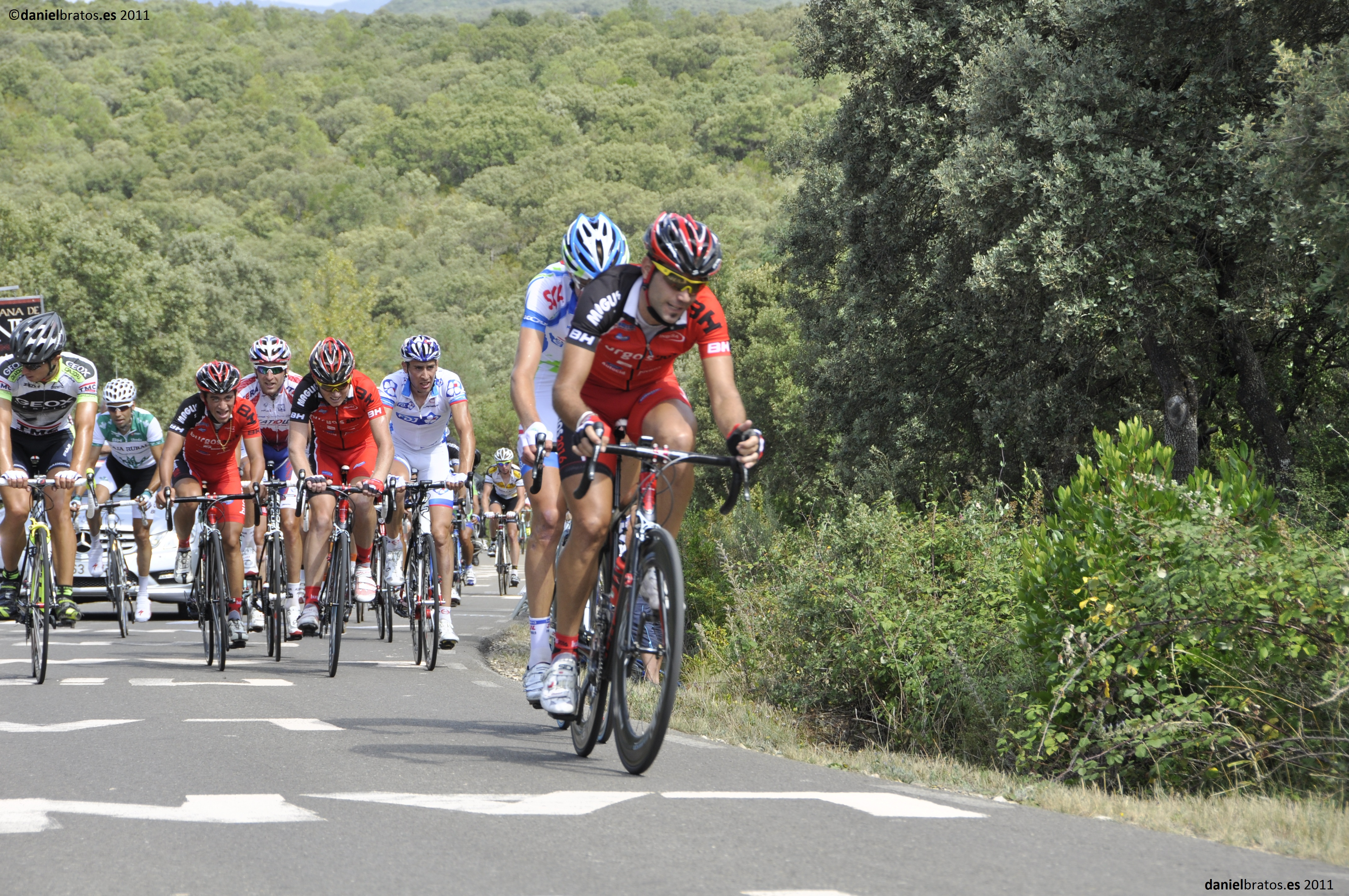
The peloton at the peak of the San Juan del Monte, during the first stage

15 teams were invited to participate in the tour: 3 UCI ProTeams, 10 UCI Professional Continental Teams and 2 UCI Continental Teams.

UCI ProTeams
- Movistar Team
- Euskaltel–Euskadi
- Team Katusha
UCI Professional Continental Teams
- Caja Rural
- Geox–TMC
- Andalucía–Caja Granada
- Colombia es Pasión–Café de Colombia
- FDJ
- Acqua & Sapone
- Saur–Sojasun
- Androni Giocattoli
- Topsport Vlaanderen–Mercator
- Skil–Shimano
UCI Continental Teams
- Burgos 2016–Castilla y León
- Orbea Continental

== Stages ==
=== Stage 1 ===
3 August 2011 – Villarcayo to Miranda de Ebro, 168.0 km (104.4 mi)

Stage 1 Result
	Rider	Team	Time
1	Samuel Sánchez (ESP)	Euskaltel–Euskadi	3h 51' 07"
2	Joaquim Rodríguez (ESP)	Team Katusha	s.t.
3	Sergio Pardilla (ESP)	Movistar Team	+ 4"
4	Denis Menchov (RUS)	Geox–TMC	s.t.
5	David López (ESP)	Movistar Team	s.t.
6	Pablo Lastras (ESP)	Movistar Team	+ 8"
7	Juan José Cobo (ESP)	Geox–TMC	s.t.
8	David Blanco (ESP)	Geox–TMC	s.t.
9	Fabrice Jeandesboz (FRA)	Saur–Sojasun	+ 10"
10	Ricardo García (ESP)	Orbea Continental	+ 12"

General Classification after Stage 1
	Rider	Team	Time
1	Samuel Sánchez (ESP)	Euskaltel–Euskadi	3h 51' 07"
2	Joaquim Rodríguez (ESP)	Team Katusha	s.t.
3	Sergio Pardilla (ESP)	Movistar Team	+ 4"
4	Denis Menchov (RUS)	Geox–TMC	s.t.
5	David López (ESP)	Movistar Team	s.t.
6	Pablo Lastras (ESP)	Movistar Team	+ 8"
7	Juan José Cobo (ESP)	Geox–TMC	s.t.
8	David Blanco (ESP)	Geox–TMC	s.t.
9	Fabrice Jeandesboz (FRA)	Saur–Sojasun	+ 10"
10	Ricardo García (ESP)	Orbea Continental	+ 12"

=== Stage 2 ===
4 August 2011 – Burgos to Burgos, 144.0 km (89.5 mi)

Stage 2 Result
	Rider	Team	Time
1	Joaquim Rodríguez (ESP)	Team Katusha	3h 26' 22"
2	Daniel Moreno (ESP)	Team Katusha	+ 3"
3	Samuel Sánchez (ESP)	Euskaltel–Euskadi	+ 7"
4	Julien Simon (FRA)	Saur–Sojasun	+ 9"
5	Juan José Cobo (ESP)	Geox–TMC	+ 10"
6	Ricardo García (ESP)	Orbea Continental	s.t.
7	Pablo Lastras (ESP)	Movistar Team	s.t.
8	Fabio Felline (ITA)	Geox–TMC	+ 13"
9	Arnaud Gérard (FRA)	FDJ	s.t.
10	Pieter Serry (BEL)	Topsport Vlaanderen–Mercator	s.t.

General Classification after Stage 2
	Rider	Team	Time
1	Joaquim Rodríguez (ESP)	Team Katusha	7h 17' 29"
2	Samuel Sánchez (ESP)	Euskaltel–Euskadi	+ 7"
3	David López (ESP)	Movistar Team	+ 17"
4	Sergio Pardilla (ESP)	Movistar Team	s.t.
5	Juan José Cobo (ESP)	Geox–TMC	+ 18"
6	Pablo Lastras (ESP)	Movistar Team	s.t.
7	David Blanco (ESP)	Geox–TMC	+ 21"
8	Ricardo García (ESP)	Orbea Continental	+ 22"
9	Fabrice Jeandesboz (FRA)	Saur–Sojasun	+ 23"
10	Igor Antón (ESP)	Euskaltel–Euskadi	+ 25"

=== Stage 3 ===
5 August 2011 – Pradoluengo to Belorado, 11.3 km (7.0 mi) team time trial (TTT)

Stage 3 Result
	Team	Time
1	Movistar Team	09' 54"
2	Team Katusha	+ 10"
3	Acqua & Sapone	+ 13"
4	Saur–Sojasun	+ 17"
5	Caja Rural	+ 19"
6	FDJ	s.t.
7	Androni Giocattoli	+ 20"
8	Geox–TMC	s.t.
9	Skil–Shimano	+ 23"
10	Euskaltel–Euskadi	+ 24"

General Classification after Stage 3
	Rider	Team	Time
1	Joaquim Rodríguez (ESP)	Team Katusha	7h 27' 33"
2	Sergio Pardilla (ESP)	Movistar Team	+ 7"
3	David López (ESP)	Movistar Team	s.t.
4	Pablo Lastras (ESP)	Movistar Team	+ 8"
5	Samuel Sánchez (ESP)	Euskaltel–Euskadi	+ 21"
6	Francisco Ventoso (ESP)	Movistar Team	+ 23"
7	Fabrice Jeandesboz (FRA)	Saur–Sojasun	+ 30"
8	David Blanco (ESP)	Geox–TMC	+ 31"
9	Daniel Moreno (ESP)	Team Katusha	+ 32"
10	Denis Menchov (RUS)	Geox–TMC	+ 36"

=== Stage 4 ===
6 August 2011 – Roa de Duero to Ciudad Romana de Clunia, 168.0 km (104.4 mi)

Stage 4 Result
	Rider	Team	Time
1	Daniel Moreno (ESP)	Team Katusha	3h 44' 28"
2	Samuel Sánchez (ESP)	Euskaltel–Euskadi	+ 1"
3	Pablo Lastras (ESP)	Movistar Team	s.t.
4	Ricardo García (ESP)	Orbea Continental	s.t.
5	Juan José Cobo (ESP)	Geox–TMC	s.t.
6	Joaquim Rodríguez (ESP)	Team Katusha	s.t.
7	Stefano Garzelli (ITA)	Acqua & Sapone	s.t.
8	David Blanco (ESP)	Geox–TMC	s.t.
9	Yukihiro Doi (JPN)	Skil–Shimano	s.t.
10	Denis Menchov (RUS)	Geox–TMC	s.t.

General Classification after Stage 4
	Rider	Team	Time
1	Joaquim Rodríguez (ESP)	Team Katusha	11h 12' 02"
2	David López (ESP)	Movistar Team	+7"
3	Pablo Lastras (ESP)	Movistar Team	+ 8"
4	Samuel Sánchez (ESP)	Euskaltel–Euskadi	+ 21"
5	Daniel Moreno (ESP)	Team Katusha	+ 31"
6	David Blanco (ESP)	Geox–TMC	s.t.
7	Denis Menchov (RUS)	Geox–TMC	+ 36"
8	Igor Antón (ESP)	Euskaltel–Euskadi	+ 39"
9	Yannick Talabardon (FRA)	Saur–Sojasun	+ 40"
10	Ricardo García (ESP)	Orbea Continental	+ 41"

=== Stage 5 ===
7 August 2011 – Areniscas de los Pinares to Lagunas de Neila, 155.0 km (96.3 mi)

Stage 5 Result
	Rider	Team	Time
1	Mikel Landa (ESP)	Euskaltel–Euskadi	4h 00' 20"
2	Juan José Cobo (ESP)	Geox–TMC	+ 3"
3	Joaquim Rodríguez (ESP)	Team Katusha	+ 12"
4	Daniel Moreno (ESP)	Team Katusha	+ 17"
5	Fabrice Jeandesboz (FRA)	Saur–Sojasun	+ 33"
6	Darwin Atapuma (COL)	Colombia es Pasión–Café de Colombia	+ 1' 10"
7	Samuel Sánchez (ESP)	Euskaltel–Euskadi	+ 1' 14"
8	Mikel Nieve (ESP)	Euskaltel–Euskadi	+ 1' 28"
9	Sergio Pardilla (ESP)	Movistar Team	+ 1' 29"
10	Igor Antón (ESP)	Euskaltel–Euskadi	+ 1' 58"

Final General Classification
	Rider	Team	Time
1	Joaquim Rodríguez (ESP)	Team Katusha	15h 12' 34"
2	Daniel Moreno (ESP)	Team Katusha	+ 36"
3	Juan José Cobo (ESP)	Geox–TMC	+ 45"
4	Samuel Sánchez (ESP)	Euskaltel–Euskadi	+ 1' 23"
5	Fabrice Jeandesboz (FRA)	Saur–Sojasun	+ 1' 52"
6	David López (ESP)	Movistar Team	+ 1' 58"
7	Pablo Lastras (ESP)	Movistar Team	+ 2' 06"
8	Igor Antón (ESP)	Euskaltel–Euskadi	+ 2' 25"
9	Sergio Pardilla (ESP)	Movistar Team	+ 2' 34"
10	Mikel Nieve (ESP)	Euskaltel–Euskadi	+ 2' 55"

== Classification leadership ==
Stage	Winner	General classification	Points classification	Mountains classification	Sprints classification	Team classification
1	Samuel Sánchez	Samuel Sánchez	Samuel Sánchez	José Luis Roldan	Kenny De Ketele	Movistar Team
2	Joaquim Rodríguez	Joaquim Rodríguez	Joaquim Rodríguez	Joaquim Rodríguez	Kenny De Ketele	Movistar Team
3	Movistar Team	Joaquim Rodríguez	Joaquim Rodríguez	Joaquim Rodríguez	Kenny De Ketele	Movistar Team
4	Daniel Moreno	Joaquim Rodríguez	Joaquim Rodríguez	Joaquim Rodríguez	Kenny De Ketele	Movistar Team
5	Mikel Landa	Joaquim Rodríguez	Joaquim Rodríguez	Mikel Landa	Kenny De Ketele	Euskaltel–Euskadi
Final		Joaquim Rodríguez	Joaquim Rodríguez	Mikel Landa	Kenny De Ketele	Euskaltel–Euskadi

== Final standings ==
=== General classification ===
	Rider	Team	Time
1	Joaquim Rodríguez (ESP)	Team Katusha	15h 12' 34"
2	Daniel Moreno (ESP)	Team Katusha	+ 36"
3	Juan José Cobo (ESP)	Geox–TMC	+ 45"
4	Samuel Sánchez (ESP)	Euskaltel–Euskadi	+ 1' 23"
5	Fabrice Jeandesboz (FRA)	Saur–Sojasun	+ 1' 52"
6	David López (ESP)	Movistar Team	+ 1' 58"
7	Pablo Lastras (ESP)	Movistar Team	+ 2' 06"
8	Igor Antón (ESP)	Euskaltel–Euskadi	+ 2' 25"
9	Sergio Pardilla (ESP)	Movistar Team	+ 2' 34"
10	Mikel Nieve (ESP)	Euskaltel–Euskadi	+ 2' 55"

=== Points classification ===
	Rider	Team	Points
1	Joaquim Rodríguez (ESP)	Team Katusha	78
2	Samuel Sánchez (ESP)	Euskaltel–Euskadi	70
3	Daniel Moreno (ESP)	Team Katusha	62
4	Juan José Cobo (ESP)	Geox–TMC	53
5	Pablo Lastras (ESP)	Movistar Team	48
6	Sergio Pardilla (ESP)	Movistar Team	42
7	David López (ESP)	Movistar Team	35
8	Ricardo García (ESP)	Orbea Continental	30
9	Mikel Landa (ESP)	Euskaltel–Euskadi	25
10	Francisco Ventoso (ESP)	Movistar Team	25

=== Mountains classification ===
	Rider	Team	Points
1	Mikel Landa (ESP)	Euskaltel–Euskadi	45
2	Samuel Sánchez (ESP)	Euskaltel–Euskadi	42
3	Joaquim Rodríguez (ESP)	Team Katusha	39
4	Juan José Cobo (ESP)	Geox–TMC	35
5	Daniel Moreno (ESP)	Team Katusha	30
6	José Luis Roldan (ESP)	Andalucía–Caja Granada	19
7	Fabrice Jeandesboz (FRA)	Saur–Sojasun	16
8	Cyril Bessy (FRA)	Saur–Sojasun	12
9	Mikel Nieve (ESP)	Euskaltel–Euskadi	11
10	Darwin Atapuma (COL)	Colombia es Pasión–Café de Colombia	10

=== Sprints classification ===
	Rider	Team	Time
1	Kenny De Ketele (BEL)	Topsport Vlaanderen–Mercator	15
2	Etienne Tortelier (FRA)	Saur–Sojasun	6
3	Cyril Bessy (FRA)	Saur–Sojasun	5
4	José Luis Roldan (ESP)	Andalucía–Caja Granada	4
5	Yoann Offredo (FRA)	FDJ	4
6	Jordi Simón3 (ESP)	Caja Rural	3
7	Victor Cabedo (ESP)	Orbea Continental	3
8	Antonio Cabello (ESP)	Andalucía–Caja Granada	3
9	Juan José Oroz (ESP)	Euskaltel–Euskadi	2
10	Jesús Rosendo (ESP)	Andalucía–Caja Granada	2

=== Team classification ===
Pos.	Team	Time
1	Euskaltel–Euskadi	45h 21' 07"
2	Movistar Team	+ 2' 37"
3	Team Katusha	+ 4' 00"
4	Geox–TMC	+ 8' 57"
5	Colombia es Pasión–Café de Colombia	+ 9' 56"
6	Saur–Sojasun	+ 16' 41"
7	Andalucía–Caja Granada	+ 18' 12"
8	FDJ	+ 25' 21"
9	Caja Rural	+ 26' 26"
10	Acqua & Sapone	+ 30' 13"
