= Mamykin =

Mamykin (Russian: Мамыкин) is a Russian masculine surname, its feminine counterpart is Mamykina. Notable people with the surname include:

- Aleksei Mamykin (1936–2011), Russian football player and coach
- Matvey Mamykin (born 1994), Russian cyclist
