= Sergio Pardilla =

Spanish road cyclist (born 1984)

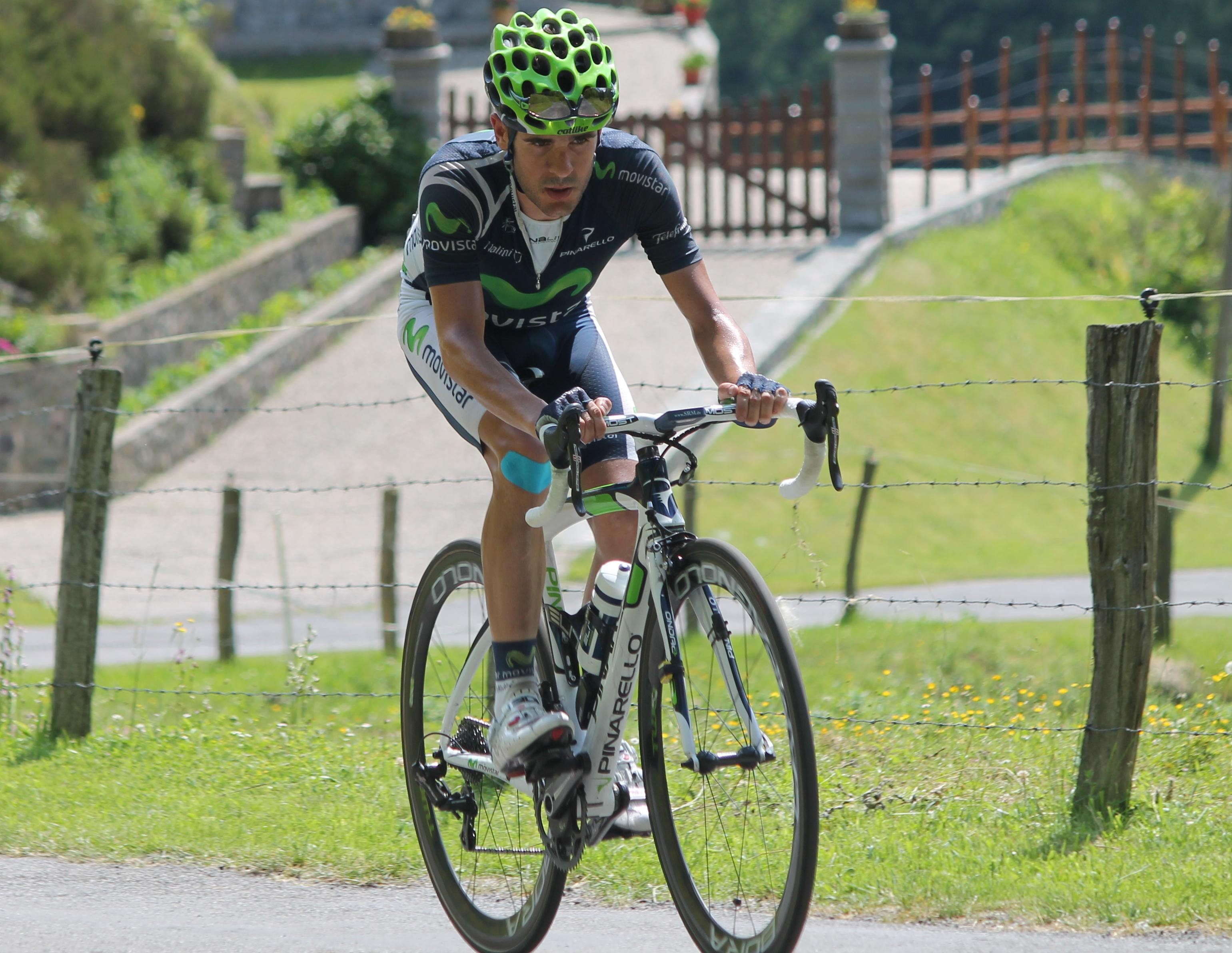
- Pardilla at the 2012 Route du Sud

Personal information
- Full name: Sergio Pardilla Bellón
- Born: 16 January 1984 (age 42) Membrilla, Spain
- Height: 1.70 m (5 ft 7 in)
- Weight: 57 kg (126 lb)

Cycling career
- Sport: Cycling
- Current team: Retired
- Discipline: Road
- Role: Rider
- Rider type: Climber

Amateur team
- 2005: Caprabo

Professional teams
- 2006–2008: Viña Magna–Cropu
- 2009–2010: Carmiooro A Style
- 2011–2012: Movistar Team
- 2013–2014: MTN–Qhubeka
- 2015–2019: Caja Rural–Seguros RGA

Sergio Pardilla Bellón (born 16 January 1984) is a Spanish former professional road cyclist, who competed professionally between 2006 and 2019 for the Burgos Monumental, Carmiooro NGC, Movistar Team, MTN–Qhubeka and Caja Rural–Seguros RGA teams.

== Major results ==
2005
3rd Overall Circuito Montañés

1st Stage 4

2006
Tour de l'Avenir

1st Mountains classification
1st Stage 10

8th Overall Circuito Montañés
9th Overall Vuelta a Navarra
2007
1st Overall Tour des Pyrénées

1st Stage 3

4th Overall Cinturón a Mallorca
7th Overall Vuelta a Cuba
9th Subida a Urkiola
2008
2nd Overall Vuelta a La Rioja

1st Stage 3

3rd Prueba Villafranca de Ordizia
3rd Subida a Urkiola
4th Overall Cinturón a Mallorca
4th Clásica a los Puertos de Guadarrama
5th Overall Cinturó de l'Empordà
7th Overall Circuito Montañés
8th Overall Vuelta a Castilla y León
2009
1st Overall Tour of Japan

1st Stage 5

3rd Overall Circuito Montañés

1st Stage 6

7th Overall Brixia Tour
2010
1st Overall Vuelta a la Comunidad de Madrid

1st Stage 3

2nd Overall Tour of Austria
3rd Overall Volta a Portugal
3rd Overall Vuelta a Andalucía

1st Stage 1

6th Overall Giro del Trentino
8th Overall Settimana Internazionale di Coppi e Bartali
10th Giro dell'Appennino
10th Grand Prix of Aargau Canton
10th Prueba Villafranca de Ordizia
2011
7th Overall Brixia Tour
9th Overall Vuelta a Burgos

1st Stage 3 (TTT)

2012
1st Mountains classification Vuelta a Burgos
2nd Overall Tour de l'Ain
4th Overall Vuelta a Murcia
7th Overall Route du Sud
10th Overall Volta a Catalunya
10th Overall Tour of Austria
2013
1st Stage 4 Volta a Portugal
3rd Overall Tour de Langkawi
6th Overall Tour of Britain
9th Overall Settimana Internazionale di Coppi e Bartali
2014
5th Overall Vuelta a Burgos
Vuelta a España

Held after Stage 5

2016
2nd Overall GP Beiras e Serra da Estrela
2nd Overall Vuelta a Asturias
3rd Overall Vuelta a Burgos

1st Stage 5

3rd Klasika Primavera de Amorebieta
5th Overall Route du Sud
7th Overall Vuelta a la Comunidad de Madrid
9th GP Industria & Artigianato di Larciano
2017
5th Overall Vuelta a Asturias
9th Overall Vuelta a la Comunidad de Madrid
9th Overall GP Beiras e Serra da Estrela
2018
6th Overall Vuelta a Burgos
7th Overall Vuelta a Asturias
10th Overall Vuelta a Aragón

=== Grand Tour general classification results timeline ===
| Grand Tour | 2011 | 2012 | 2013 | 2014 | 2015 | 2016 | 2017 | 2018 | 2019 |
|---|---|---|---|---|---|---|---|---|---|
| Giro d'Italia | 48 | 18 | — | — | — | — | — | — | — |
| Tour de France | Did not contest during career | | | | | | | | |
| Vuelta a España | DNF | — | — | 17 | — | 18 | 15 | 49 | 88 |

Legend
| — | Did not compete |
| DNF | Did not finish |
