= 2010 Vuelta a Andalucía =

The 2010 Vuelta a Andalucía is the 56th edition of the Vuelta a Andalucía stage race. The previous edition was won by Rabobank's Joost Posthuma. The race started at 21 February and finished at 25 February.

== Stages ==
=== Stage 1 ===
21 February 2010, Jaén to Puerto de La Guardia, 159.2 km (98.9 mi)

Stage 1 results

	Cyclist	Team	Time
1	Sergio Pardilla (ESP)	Carmiooro NGC	4h 11' 55"
2	Jurgen Van den Broeck (BEL)	Omega Pharma–Lotto	+ 9"
3	Damiano Cunego (ITA)	Lampre–Farnese Vini	+ 13"
4	Manuel Vázquez Hueso (ESP)	Andalucía–Cajasur	+ 13"
5	Bauke Mollema (NED)	Rabobank	+ 21"
6	Michael Rogers (AUS)	Team HTC–Columbia	+ 21"
7	Javier Moreno (ESP)	Andalucía–Cajasur	+ 28"
8	Daniel Moreno (ESP)	Omega Pharma–Lotto	+ 29"
9	Jelle Vanendert (BEL)	Omega Pharma–Lotto	+ 29"
10	Thomas Löfkvist (SWE)	Team Sky	+ 31"

=== Stage 2 ===
22 February 2010, Otura to Cordoba, 182.2 km (113.2 mi)

Stage 2 results

	Cyclist	Team	Time
1	Óscar Freire (ESP)	Rabobank	4h 53' 06"
2	Robert Wagner (GER)	Skil–Shimano	+ 0"
3	Alex Rasmussen (DEN)	Team Saxo Bank	+ 0"
4	Mark Cavendish (GBR)	Team HTC–Columbia	+ 0"
5	Francisco Ventoso (ESP)	Carmiooro NGC	+ 0"
6	Marco Marcato (ITA)	Vacansoleil	+ 0"
7	Greg Henderson (NZL)	Team Sky	+ 0"
8	Paul Martens (GER)	Rabobank	+ 0"
9	Jens Voigt (GER)	Team Saxo Bank	+ 0"
10	Fabian Wegmann (GER)	Team Milram	+ 0"

=== Stage 3 ===
23 February 2010, Marbella to Benahavis, 162.5 km (101.0 mi)

Stage 3 results

	Cyclist	Team	Time
1	Óscar Freire (ESP)	Rabobank	4h 33' 35"
2	Grega Bole (SLO)	Lampre–Farnese Vini	+ 0"
3	Simon Gerrans (AUS)	Team Sky	+ 0"
4	Fabian Wegmann (GER)	Team Milram	+ 0"
5	Ángel Vicioso (ESP)	Andalucía–Cajasur	+ 0"
6	Jens Voigt (GER)	Team Saxo Bank	+ 0"
7	Marco Marcato (ITA)	Vacansoleil	+ 0"
8	Paul Martens (GER)	Rabobank	+ 0"
9	Maxime Monfort (BEL)	Team HTC–Columbia	+ 0"
10	Markus Fothen (GER)	Team Milram	+ 0"

=== Stage 4 ===
24 February 2010, Malaga (ITT) 10.9 km (6.8 mi)

Stage 4 results

	Cyclist	Team	Time
1	Alex Rasmussen (DEN)	Team Saxo Bank	12' 59"
2	Bradley Wiggins (GBR)	Team Sky	+ 5"
3	Tony Martin (GER)	Team HTC–Columbia	+ 7"
4	Michael Rogers (AUS)	Team HTC–Columbia	+ 12"
5	Jens Voigt (GER)	Team Saxo Bank	+ 23"
6	Hayden Roulston (NZL)	Team HTC–Columbia	+ 25"
7	Gustav Larsson (SWE)	Team Saxo Bank	+ 28"
8	Paul Martens (GER)	Rabobank	+ 28"
9	Greg Henderson (NZL)	Team Sky	+ 30"
10	Maxime Monfort (BEL)	Team HTC–Columbia	+ 34"

=== Stage 5 ===
25 February 2010, Torrox Costa to Antequera 161.4 km (100.3 mi)

Stage 5 results

	Cyclist	Team	Time
1	Francisco Ventoso (ESP)	Carmiooro NGC	4h 20' 05"
2	Simon Gerrans (AUS)	Team Sky	+ 0"
3	Michael Rogers (AUS)	Team HTC–Columbia	+ 2"
4	Bauke Mollema (NED)	Rabobank	+ 2"
5	Jens Voigt (GER)	Team Saxo Bank	+ 2"
6	Simon Geschke (GER)	Skil–Shimano	+ 2"
7	Sergio Pardilla (ESP)	Carmiooro NGC	+ 2"
8	Manuel Vázquez Hueso (ESP)	Andalucía–Cajasur	+ 2"
9	Jurgen Van den Broeck (BEL)	Omega Pharma–Lotto	+ 2"
10	Johnny Hoogerland (NED)	Vacansoleil	+ 2"

== Final standings ==
=== General Classification ===
	Cyclist	Team	Time
1	Michael Rogers (AUS)	Team HTC–Columbia	18h 12' 16"
2	Jurgen van den Broeck (BEL)	Omega Pharma–Lotto	+ 19"
3	Sergio Pardilla (ESP)	Carmiooro NGC	+ 30"
4	Jens Voigt (GER)	Team Saxo Bank	+ 31"
5	Bauke Mollema (NED)	Rabobank	+ 35"
6	Maxime Monfort (BEL)	Team HTC–Columbia	+ 38"
7	Gustav Larsson (SWE)	Team Saxo Bank	+ 44"
8	Manuel Vázquez Hueso (ESP)	Andalucía–Cajasur	+ 46"
9	Linus Gerdemann (GER)	Team Milram	+ 46"
10	Thomas Löfkvist (SWE)	Team Sky	+ 50"

=== Points Classification ===
	Rider	Team	Points
1	Óscar Freire (ESP)	Rabobank	50
2	Michael Rogers (AUS)	Team HTC–Columbia	44
3	Jens Voigt (GER)	Team CSC	42
4	Francisco Ventoso (ESP)	Carmiooro NGC	37
5	Simon Gerrans (AUS)	Team Sky	36
6	Sergio Pardilla (ESP)	Carmiooro NGC	34
7	Jurgen van den Broeck (BEL)	Omega Pharma–Lotto	33
8	Bauke Mollema (NED)	Rabobank	27
9	Paul Martens (GER)	Rabobank	24
10	Manuel Vázquez Hueso (ESP)	Andalucía–Cajasur	22

=== King of the Mountains classification ===
	Rider	Team	Points
1	Brice Feillu (FRA)	Vacansoleil	46
2	José Ángel Gómez Marchante (ESP)	Andalucía–Cajasur	20
3	Laurent Beuret (SWI)	Carmiooro NGC	12
4	Bradley Wiggins (GBR)	Team Sky	11
5	Sergio Pardilla (ESP)	Carmiooro NGC	10
