= 2016 Vuelta a Burgos =

2016 UCI Europe Tour

Race details
- Dates: 2 August – 6 August
- Stages: 5

Results
Jersey awarded to the overall winner	Winner	Alberto Contador (ESP)	(Tinkoff)
	Second	Ben Hermans (BEL)	(BMC Racing Team)
	Third	Sergio Pardilla (ESP)	(Caja Rural–Seguros RGA)
Jersey awarded to the points classification winner	Points	Danny van Poppel (NED)	(Team Sky)
Jersey awarded to the mountains classification winner	Mountains	Omar Fraile (ESP)	(Team Dimension Data)
Jersey awarded to the young rider classification winner	Young rider	Matvey Mamykin (RUS)	(Team Katusha)
	Team	(Spain) Movistar Team	

The 2016 Vuelta a Burgos was a men's road bicycle race which was held from 2 August to 6 August 2016. It was the 38th edition of the Vuelta a Burgos stage race, which was established in 1946. The race was rated as a 2.HC event and forms part of the 2016 UCI Europe Tour. The race was made up of five stages including a team time trial. Alberto Contador of Tinkoff won the race.

== Teams ==
A total of 21 teams with 8 riders each will race in the 2016 Vuelta a Burgos: 13 UCI ProTeams, 6 UCI Professional Continental Teams and 2 UCI Continental Teams.

World Tour teams

- AG2R La Mondiale
- Astana
- BMC Racing Team
- Team Dimension Data
- Etixx–Quick-Step
- FDJ
- Movistar Team
- Team Giant–Alpecin
- Team Katusha
- Team Sky
- Tinkoff
- Cannondale–Drapac
- Orica–BikeExchange

Professional Continental teams

- Caja Rural–Seguros RGA
- Gazprom–RusVelo
- Nippo–Vini Fantini
- ONE Pro Cycling
- Roompot–Oranje Peloton
- Topsport Vlaanderen–Baloise

Continental teams

- Burgos BH
- Euskadi Basque Country–Murias

== Route ==
Stage characteristics and winners
Stage	Date	Course	Distance	Type	Stage winner
1	2 August	Sasamón to Melgar de Fernamental	158 km (98 mi)	Flat stage	Danny van Poppel (NED)
2	3 August	Burgos	10.72 km (6.66 mi)	Team Time Trial	Astana Pro Team
3	4 August	Valle de Sedano to Villarcayo	198 km (123 mi)	Flat stage	Danny van Poppel (NED)
4	5 August	Aranda de Duero to Lerma	145 km (90 mi)	Flat stage	Nathan Haas (AUS)
5	6 August	Caleruega to Lagunas de Neila	163 km (101 mi)	Mountain stage	Sergio Pardilla (ESP)

== Stages ==
=== Stage 1 ===
Stage 1 result and general classification after Stage 1

Rank	Rider	Team	Time
1	Danny van Poppel (NED)	Team Sky	3h 32' 04"
2	Jempy Drucker (LUX)	BMC Racing Team	s.t.
3	Gianni Meersman (BEL)	Etixx–Quick-Step	s.t.
4	Wouter Wippert (NED)	Cannondale–Drapac	s.t.
5	Steele Von Hoff (AUS)	ONE Pro Cycling	s.t.
6	José Joaquín Rojas (ESP)	Movistar Team	s.t.
7	Nathan Haas (AUS)	Team Dimension Data	s.t.
8	Pieter Vanspeybrouck (BEL)	Topsport Vlaanderen–Baloise	s.t.
9	Luka Mezgec (SLO)	Orica–BikeExchange	s.t.
10	Zico Waeytens (BEL)	Team Giant–Alpecin	s.t.

=== Stage 2 ===
Stage 2 result

Rank	Team	Time
1	Astana	13' 10"
2	Etixx–Quick-Step	+ 3"
3	Movistar Team	s.t.
4	Team Sky	+ 7"
5	BMC Racing Team	+ 9"
6	Orica–BikeExchange	+ 10"
7	Team Katusha	+ 11"
8	Tinkoff	+ 13"
9	Caja Rural–Seguros RGA	+ 14"
10	FDJ	+ 16"

General classification after Stage 2

Rank	Rider	Team	Time
1	Dmitriy Gruzdev (KAZ)	Astana	3h 45' 14"
2	Dario Cataldo (ITA)	Astana	s.t.
3	Eros Capecchi (ITA)	Astana	s.t.
4	Michele Scarponi (ITA)	Astana	s.t.
5	Gianni Meersman (BEL)	Etixx–Quick-Step	+ 3"
6	José Joaquín Rojas (ESP)	Movistar Team	s.t.
7	Gianluca Brambilla (ITA)	Etixx–Quick-Step	s.t.
8	David De La Cruz (ESP)	Etixx–Quick-Step	s.t.
9	Gorka Izagirre (ESP)	Movistar Team	s.t.
10	Yves Lampaert (BEL)	Etixx–Quick-Step	s.t.

=== Stage 3 ===
Stage 3 result

Rank	Rider	Team	Time
1	Danny van Poppel (NED)	Team Sky	4h 35' 47"
2	Jempy Drucker (LUX)	BMC Racing Team	s.t.
3	Gianni Meersman (BEL)	Etixx–Quick-Step	s.t.
4	Pieter Vanspeybrouck (BEL)	Topsport Vlaanderen–Baloise	s.t.
5	Kristian Sbaragli (ITA)	Team Dimension Data	s.t.
6	Yves Lampaert (BEL)	Etixx–Quick-Step	s.t.
7	José Joaquín Rojas (ESP)	Movistar Team	s.t.
8	Luka Mezgec (SLO)	Orica–BikeExchange	s.t.
9	Zico Waeytens (BEL)	Team Giant–Alpecin	s.t.
10	Ángel Madrazo (ESP)	Caja Rural–Seguros RGA	s.t.

General classification after Stage 3

Rank	Rider	Team	Time
1	Dmitriy Gruzdev (KAZ)	Astana	8h 21' 01"
2	Dario Cataldo (ITA)	Astana	s.t.
3	Michele Scarponi (ITA)	Astana	s.t.
4	Gianni Meersman (BEL)	Etixx–Quick-Step	+ 3"
5	José Joaquín Rojas (ESP)	Movistar Team	s.t.
6	David De La Cruz (ESP)	Etixx–Quick-Step	s.t.
7	Gianluca Brambilla (ITA)	Etixx–Quick-Step	s.t.
8	Rubén Fernández (ESP)	Movistar Team	s.t.
9	Gorka Izagirre (ESP)	Movistar Team	s.t.
10	Yves Lampaert (BEL)	Etixx–Quick-Step	s.t.

=== Stage 4 ===
Stage 4 result

Rank	Rider	Team	Time
1	Nathan Haas (AUS)	Team Dimension Data	3h 15' 42"
2	Jempy Drucker (LUX)	BMC Racing Team	s.t.
3	Patrick Bevin (AUS)	Cannondale–Drapac	s.t.
4	Danny van Poppel (NED)	Team Sky	s.t.
5	Alexey Tsatevich (RUS)	Team Katusha	s.t.
6	Gianni Meersman (BEL)	Etixx–Quick-Step	s.t.
7	Loïc Vliegen (BEL)	BMC Racing Team	s.t.
8	Eduard-Michael Grosu (ROM)	Nippo–Vini Fantini	+ 3"
9	Zico Waeytens (BEL)	Team Giant–Alpecin	s.t.
10	Karol Domagalski (POL)	ONE Pro Cycling	s.t.

General classification after Stage 4

Rank	Rider	Team	Time
1	Gianni Meersman (BEL)	Etixx–Quick-Step	11h 36' 46"
2	Dmitriy Gruzdev (KAZ)	Astana	s.t.
3	Dario Cataldo (ITA)	Astana	s.t.
4	Michele Scarponi (ITA)	Astana	s.t.
5	José Joaquín Rojas (ESP)	Movistar Team	+ 3"
6	Rubén Fernández (ESP)	Movistar Team	s.t.
7	Gorka Izagirre (ESP)	Movistar Team	s.t.
8	Gianluca Brambilla (ITA)	Etixx–Quick-Step	s.t.
9	David De La Cruz (ESP)	Etixx–Quick-Step	s.t.
10	Pieter Serry (BEL)	Etixx–Quick-Step	s.t.

=== Stage 5 ===
Stage 5 result

Rank	Rider	Team	Time
1	Sergio Pardilla (ESP)	Caja Rural–Seguros RGA	4h 13' 34"
2	Alberto Contador (ESP)	Tinkoff	+ 17"
3	Ben Hermans (BEL)	BMC Racing Team	+ 22"
4	Simon Yates (GBR)	Orica–BikeExchange	+ 24"
5	Igor Antón (ESP)	Team Dimension Data	+ 31"
6	Peter Kennaugh (GBR)	Team Sky	+ 34"
7	Rubén Fernández (ESP)	Movistar Team	+ 43"
8	Domenico Pozzovivo (ITA)	AG2R La Mondiale	+ 1' 00"
9	Gianluca Brambilla (ITA)	Etixx–Quick-Step	+ 1' 03"
10	Matvey Mamykin (RUS)	Team Katusha	+ 1' 16"

General classification after Stage 5

Rank	Rider	Team	Time
1	Alberto Contador (ESP)	Tinkoff	15h 50' 50"
2	Ben Hermans (BEL)	BMC Racing Team	+ 1"
3	Sergio Pardilla (ESP)	Caja Rural–Seguros RGA	s.t.
4	Simon Yates (GBR)	Orica–BikeExchange	+ 4"
5	Peter Kennaugh (GBR)	Team Sky	+ 11"
6	Rubén Fernández (ESP)	Movistar Team	+ 16"
7	Gianluca Brambilla (ITA)	Etixx–Quick-Step	+ 36"
8	Matvey Mamykin (RUS)	Team Katusha	+ 57"
9	Igor Antón (ESP)	Team Dimension Data	+ 1' 04"
10	Domenico Pozzovivo (ITA)	AG2R La Mondiale	s.t.

== Classification leadership ==
Stage	Winner	General classification	Points classification	Mountains classification	Young rider classification	Team classification
1	Danny van Poppel	Danny van Poppel	Danny van Poppel	Martijn Tusveld	Jhonatan Restrepo	CCC Pro Team
2	Astana	Dmitriy Gruzdev	Danny van Poppel	Martijn Tusveld	Jhonatan Restrepo	XDS Astana Team
3	Danny van Poppel	Dmitriy Gruzdev	Danny van Poppel	Jochem Hoekstra	Matvey Mamykin	XDS Astana Team
4	Nathan Haas	Gianni Meersman	Danny van Poppel	Jacques Janse van Rensburg	Matvey Mamykin	XDS Astana Team
5	Sergio Pardilla	Alberto Contador	Danny van Poppel	Omar Fraile	Matvey Mamykin	Movistar Team
Final		Alberto Contador	Danny van Poppel	Omar Fraile	Matvey Mamykin	Movistar Team
