= 2016 Vuelta a Asturias =

2016 UCI Europe Tour

Race details
- Dates: April 30, 2016–May 2, 2016
- Stages: 3
- Distance: 460.7 km (286.3 mi)
- Winning time: 11h 50' 53"

Results
Jersey awarded to the overall winner	Winner	Hugh Carthy (GBR)	(Caja Rural–Seguros RGA)
	Second	Sergio Pardilla (ESP)	(Caja Rural–Seguros RGA)
	Third	Daniel Moreno (ESP)	(Movistar Team)
Jersey awarded to the points classification winner	Points	Daniel Moreno (ESP)	(Movistar Team)
Jersey awarded to the mountains classification winner	Mountains	Raúl Alarcón (ESP)	(W52 / FC Porto / Porto Canal)
	Young rider	Hugh Carthy (GBR)	(Caja Rural–Seguros RGA)
Jersey awarded to the sprints classification winner	Sprints	Diego Milán (DOM)	(Inteja–MMR Dominican Cycling Team)
	Team	Caja Rural–Seguros RGA	

The 2016 Vuelta a Asturias was the 59th edition of the Vuelta a Asturias cycling stage race. The race included three stages: it started on 30 April with a stage from Oviedo to Alto del Acebo (Cangas del Narcea) and finished on 2 May with a stage that started in Bueño and then finished back in Oviedo. The defending champion was Igor Antón (Movistar Team).

The race was won by Hugh Carthy (Caja Rural–Seguros RGA), who won a solo victory on the first stage and then finished in the third position on the last stage to secure victory by 22 seconds.

== Teams ==
A total of 14 teams and one national combined team raced in the 2016 Vuelta a Asturias: one UCI World Team, another UCI Professional Continental team and 12 UCI Continental teams.

World Tour teams

- Movistar Team

Professional Continental teams

- Caja Rural–Seguros RGA

Continental teams

- Boyacá Raza de Campeones
- Burgos BH
- Dare Gobik
- D'Amico–Bottecchia
- Euskadi Basque Country–Murias
- Inteja–MMR Dominican Cycling Team
- Lokosphinx
- Louletano–Hospital de Loulé
- Team Manzana Postobón
- Massi–Kuwait Cycling Project
- Rádio Popular–Boavista
- W52 / FC Porto / Porto Canal

== Schedule ==
The race included three road stages on consecutive days.

Stage	Date	Course	Distance	Type	Winner
1	30 April	Oviedo to Alto del Acebo	152.5 km (94.8 mi)	Mountain stage	Hugh Carthy (GBR)
2	1 May	Cangas del Narcea to Pola de Lena	186.7 km (116.0 mi)	Medium-mountain stage	Carlos Betancur (COL)
3	2 May	Bueño to Oviedo	121.5 km (75.5 mi)	Medium-mountain stage	Daniel Moreno (ESP)
Total		460.7 km (286.3 mi)			

== Stages ==
=== Stage 1 ===
30 April – Oviedo to Alto del Acebo, 152.5 km (94.8 mi)

Result of stage 1
Rank	Rider	Team	Time
1	Hugh Carthy (GBR)	Caja Rural–Seguros RGA	4hr 10' 40"
2	Sergio Pardilla (ESP)	Caja Rural–Seguros RGA	+22"
3	Garikoitz Bravo (ESP)	Euskadi Basque Country–Murias	+28"
4	Mikel Bizkarra (ESP)	Euskadi Basque Country–Murias	+34"
5	Heiner Parra (COL)	Boyacá Raza de Campeones	+44"
6	Daniel Moreno (ESP)	Movistar Team	+51"
7	Javier Moreno (ESP)	Movistar Team	+1' 06"
8	Ángel Madrazo (ESP)	Caja Rural–Seguros RGA	+1' 11"
9	Fabricio Ferrari (URU)	Caja Rural–Seguros RGA	+1' 46"
10	António Carvalho (POR)	W52 / FC Porto / Porto Canal	+1' 46"
Source: La Nueva España

General classification after stage 1
Rank	Rider	Team	Time
1	Hugh Carthy (GBR)	Caja Rural–Seguros RGA	4hr 10' 30"
2	Sergio Pardilla (ESP)	Caja Rural–Seguros RGA	+26"
3	Garikoitz Bravo (ESP)	Euskadi Basque Country–Murias	+34"
4	Mikel Bizkarra (ESP)	Euskadi Basque Country–Murias	+44"
5	Heiner Parra (COL)	Boyacá Raza de Campeones	+54"
6	Daniel Moreno (ESP)	Movistar Team	+1' 01""
7	Javier Moreno (ESP)	Movistar Team	+1' 16"
8	Ángel Madrazo (ESP)	Caja Rural–Seguros RGA	+1' 21"
9	Fabricio Ferrari (URU)	Caja Rural–Seguros RGA	+1' 56"
10	António Carvalho (POR)	W52 / FC Porto / Porto Canal	+1' 56"
Source: La Nueva España

=== Stage 2 ===
1 May – Cangas del Narcea to Pola de Lena, 186.7 km (116.0 mi)

Result of stage 2
Rank	Rider	Team	Time
1	Carlos Betancur (COL)	Movistar Team	4hr 42' 11"
2	Fabricio Ferrari (URU)	Caja Rural–Seguros RGA	+0"
3	Alexander Vdovin (RUS)	Lokosphinx	+7"
4	Daniel Moreno (ESP)	Movistar Team	+16"
5	Sergey Shilov (RUS)	Lokosphinx	+16"
6	Eduard Prades (ESP)	Caja Rural–Seguros RGA	+16"
7	Garikoitz Bravo (ESP)	Euskadi Basque Country–Murias	+16"
8	Sergio Pardilla (RUS)	Caja Rural–Seguros RGA	+16"
9	David Miguel Rodrigues (POR)	Rádio Popular–Boavista	+16"
10	António Carvalho (POR)	W52 / FC Porto / Porto Canal	+16"
Source: La Nueva España

General classification after stage 2
Rank	Rider	Team	Time
1	Hugh Carthy (GBR)	Caja Rural–Seguros RGA	8hr 52' 57"
2	Sergio Pardilla (ESP)	Caja Rural–Seguros RGA	+26"
3	Garikoitz Bravo (ESP)	Euskadi Basque Country–Murias	+34"
4	Mikel Bizkarra (ESP)	Euskadi Basque Country–Murias	+44"
5	Daniel Moreno (ESP)	Movistar Team	+1' 01""
6	Ángel Madrazo (ESP)	Caja Rural–Seguros RGA	+1' 21"
7	Heiner Parra (COL)	Boyacá Raza de Campeones	+1' 21"
8	Fabricio Ferrari (URU)	Caja Rural–Seguros RGA	+1' 36"
9	David Miguel Rodrigues (POR)	Rádio Popular–Boavista	+1' 56"
10	António Carvalho (POR)	W52 / FC Porto / Porto Canal	+1' 56"
Source: La Nueva España

=== Stage 3 ===
2 May – Bueño to Oviedo, 121.5 km (75.5 mi)

Result of stage 2
Rank	Rider	Team	Time
1	Daniel Moreno (ESP)	Movistar Team	2hr 57' 58"
2	Sergio Pardilla (ESP)	Caja Rural–Seguros RGA	+0"
3	Hugh Carthy (GBR)	Caja Rural–Seguros RGA	+2"
4	António Carvalho (POR)	W52 / FC Porto / Porto Canal	+18"
5	David Miguel Rodrigues (POR)	Rádio Popular–Boavista	+18"
6	Garikoitz Bravo (ESP)	Euskadi Basque Country–Murias	+19"
7	Heiner Parra (COL)	Boyacá Raza de Campeones	+19"
8	Federico Figueiredo (POR)	Rádio Popular–Boavista	+19"
9	Mikel Bizkarra (ESP)	Euskadi Basque Country–Murias	+23"
10	Sergey Shilov (RUS)	Lokosphinx	+41"
Source: La Nueva España

Final general classification
Rank	Rider	Team	Time
1	Hugh Carthy (GBR)	Caja Rural–Seguros RGA	11hr 50' 53"
2	Sergio Pardilla (ESP)	Caja Rural–Seguros RGA	+22"
3	Daniel Moreno (ESP)	Movistar Team	+53"
4	Garikoitz Bravo (ESP)	Euskadi Basque Country–Murias	+55"
5	Heiner Parra (COL)	Boyacá Raza de Campeones	+1' 9"
6	Mikel Bizkarra (ESP)	Euskadi Basque Country–Murias	+1' 42"
7	Ángel Madrazo (ESP)	Caja Rural–Seguros RGA	+2' 4"
8	António Carvalho (POR)	W52 / FC Porto / Porto Canal	+2' 16"
9	David Miguel Rodrigues (POR)	Rádio Popular–Boavista	+2' 16"
10	Fabricio Ferrari (URU)	Caja Rural–Seguros RGA	+2' 17"
Source: La Nueva España

== Classifications ==
The race included four principal classifications, the leaders of which wore jerseys. The leader in the general classification wore a blue jersey; the leader in the points classification wore a blue jersey; the leader in the mountains classification wore a green jersey; the leader of the intermediate sprints classification wore a black and white jersey.

Stage	Winner	General classification	Points classification	Mountains classification	Intermediate sprint classification	Youth classification	Teams classification
1	Hugh Carthy	Hugh Carthy	Hugh Carthy	~~Raúl Alarcón~~	Diego Milán	Hugh Carthy	Caja Rural–Seguros RGA
2	Carlos Betancur	Hugh Carthy	Sergio Pardilla	~~Raúl Alarcón~~	Diego Milán	Hugh Carthy	Caja Rural–Seguros RGA
3	Daniel Moreno	Hugh Carthy	Daniel Moreno	~~Raúl Alarcón~~	Diego Milán	Hugh Carthy	Caja Rural–Seguros RGA
Final		Hugh Carthy	Daniel Moreno	~~Raúl Alarcón~~	Diego Milán	Hugh Carthy	Caja Rural–Seguros RGA
