= 2014 Paris–Nice =

2014 UCI World Tour, race 2 of 28

Race details
- Dates: 9–16 March 2014
- Stages: 8
- Distance: 1,447 km (899.1 mi)
- Winning time: 35h 11' 45"

Results
Jersey awarded to the overall winner	Winner	Carlos Betancur (COL)	(Ag2r–La Mondiale)
	Second	Rui Costa (POR)	(Lampre–Merida)
	Third	Arthur Vichot (FRA)	(FDJ.fr)
Jersey awarded to the points classification winner	Points	John Degenkolb (GER)	(Giant–Shimano)
Jersey awarded to the mountains classification winner	Mountains	Pim Ligthart (NED)	(Lotto–Belisol)
Jersey awarded to the youth classification winner	Youth	Carlos Betancur (COL)	(Ag2r–La Mondiale)
	Team	Movistar Team	

The 2014 Paris–Nice was the 72nd running of the Paris–Nice cycling stage race, often known as the Race to the Sun, and the first European World Tour event of the season. It started on 9 March in Mantes-la-Jolie and ended on 16 March in Nice and consisted of eight stages. It was the second race of the 2014 UCI World Tour season. The race took on an unusual profile in 2014 in that it did not feature a time trial of any description and did not have any stages with a summit finish. The intention was to make the race more open and encourage attacking racing rather than a defensive race ruled by time trial experts or the climbing specialists.

The race was won by Colombia's Carlos Betancur of Ag2r–La Mondiale, who took the lead after winning the race's queen stage – the sixth stage to Fayence, his second successive stage victory – and held the lead until the finish in Nice, to become the first Colombian rider to win the race. Betancur won the general classification by 14 seconds over runner-up Rui Costa of the Lampre–Merida squad, while FDJ.fr's Arthur Vichot completed the podium – 6 seconds behind Costa and 20 seconds down on Betancur – after he was victorious on the final stage, picking up enough bonus seconds to move up the classification.

In the race's other classifications, Giant–Shimano's John Degenkolb was the winner of the green jersey for the points classification, amassing the highest number of points during stages at intermediate sprints and stage finishes, and Pim Ligthart was the winner of the mountains classification for the Lotto–Belisol team. Betancur also won the white jersey for the young rider classification, as he was the highest placed rider born in 1989 or later, while the Movistar Team won the team classification.

== Teams ==
As Paris–Nice was a UCI World Tour event, all 18 UCI ProTeams were invited automatically and obligated to send a squad. Three other squads were given wildcard places, and as such, formed the event's 21-team peloton.

The 21 teams that competed in the race were:

- Ag2r–La Mondiale
- Astana
- Belkin Pro Cycling
- BMC Racing Team
- Bretagne–Séché Environnement
- Cannondale
- Cofidis
- Team Europcar
- FDJ.fr
- Garmin–Sharp
- Giant–Shimano
- IAM Cycling
- Team Katusha
- Lampre–Merida
- Lotto–Belisol
- Movistar Team
- Omega Pharma–Quick-Step
- Orica–GreenEDGE
- Team Sky
- Tinkoff–Saxo
- Trek Factory Racing

== Route ==
List of stages
Stage	Date	Course	Distance	Type	Winner
1	9 March	Mantes-la-Jolie to Mantes-la-Jolie	162.5 km (101 mi)	Flat stage	Nacer Bouhanni (FRA)
2	10 March	Rambouillet to Saint-Georges-sur-Baulche	205 km (127 mi)	Flat stage	Moreno Hofland (NED)
3	11 March	Toucy to Circuit de Nevers Magny-Cours	180 km (112 mi)	Hilly stage	John Degenkolb (GER)
4	12 March	Nevers to Belleville	201.5 km (125 mi)	Flat stage	Tom-Jelte Slagter (NED)
5	13 March	Crêches-sur-Saône to Rive-de-Gier	153 km (95 mi)	Hilly stage	Carlos Betancur (COL)
6	14 March	Saint-Saturnin-lès-Avignon to Fayence	221.5 km (138 mi)	Hilly stage	Carlos Betancur (COL)
7	15 March	Mougins to Biot Sophia Antipolis	195.5 km (121 mi)	Mountain stage	Tom-Jelte Slagter (NED)
8	16 March	Nice to Nice	128 km (80 mi)	Hilly stage	Arthur Vichot (FRA)

== Stages ==
=== Stage 1 ===
9 March 2014 — Mantes-la-Jolie to Mantes-la-Jolie, 162.5 km (101.0 mi)

Stage 1 Result

	Rider	Team	Time
1	Nacer Bouhanni (FRA)	FDJ.fr	3h 53' 11"
2	John Degenkolb (GER)	Giant–Shimano	s.t.
3	Gianni Meersman (BEL)	Omega Pharma–Quick-Step	s.t.
4	José Joaquín Rojas (ESP)	Movistar Team	s.t.
5	Tyler Farrar (USA)	Garmin–Sharp	s.t.
6	Bryan Coquard (FRA)	Team Europcar	s.t.
7	Luca Wackermann (ITA)	Lampre–Merida	s.t.
8	Fabio Felline (ITA)	Trek Factory Racing	s.t.
9	Fabio Sabatini (ITA)	Cannondale	s.t.
10	Francesco Gavazzi (ITA)	Astana	s.t.

General Classification after Stage 1

	Rider	Team	Time
1	Nacer Bouhanni (FRA)	FDJ.fr	3h 53' 01"
2	Gianni Meersman (BEL)	Omega Pharma–Quick-Step	+ 1"
3	John Degenkolb (GER)	Giant–Shimano	+ 4"
4	Greg Van Avermaet (BEL)	BMC Racing Team	+ 8"
5	Geraint Thomas (GBR)	Team Sky	+ 9"
6	Sylvain Chavanel (FRA)	IAM Cycling	+ 9"
7	José Joaquín Rojas (ESP)	Movistar Team	+ 10"
8	Tyler Farrar (USA)	Garmin–Sharp	+ 10"
9	Bryan Coquard (FRA)	Team Europcar	+ 10"
10	Luca Wackermann (ITA)	Lampre–Merida	+ 10"

=== Stage 2 ===
10 March 2014 — Rambouillet to Saint-Georges-sur-Baulche, 205 km (127.4 mi)

Stage 2 Result

	Rider	Team	Time
1	Moreno Hofland (NED)	Belkin Pro Cycling	4h 53' 46"
2	John Degenkolb (GER)	Giant–Shimano	s.t.
3	Nacer Bouhanni (FRA)	FDJ.fr	s.t.
4	Alexander Kristoff (NOR)	Team Katusha	s.t.
5	Thor Hushovd (NOR)	BMC Racing Team	s.t.
6	Bryan Coquard (FRA)	Team Europcar	s.t.
7	Armindo Fonseca (FRA)	Bretagne–Séché Environnement	s.t.
8	Tony Gallopin (FRA)	Lotto–Belisol	s.t.
9	Jens Keukeleire (BEL)	Orica–GreenEDGE	s.t.
10	José Joaquín Rojas (ESP)	Movistar Team	s.t.

General Classification after Stage 2

	Rider	Team	Time
1	Nacer Bouhanni (FRA)	FDJ.fr	8h 46' 43"
2	John Degenkolb (GER)	Giant–Shimano	+ 2"
3	Moreno Hofland (NED)	Belkin Pro Cycling	+ 4"
4	Geraint Thomas (GBR)	Team Sky	+ 13"
5	Bryan Coquard (FRA)	Team Europcar	+ 14"
6	José Joaquín Rojas (ESP)	Movistar Team	+ 14"
7	Alexander Kristoff (NOR)	Team Katusha	+ 14"
8	Nikolay Trusov (RUS)	Tinkoff–Saxo	+ 14"
9	Samuel Dumoulin (FRA)	Ag2r–La Mondiale	+ 14"
10	Jens Keukeleire (BEL)	Orica–GreenEDGE	+ 14"

=== Stage 3 ===
11 March 2014 — Toucy to Circuit de Nevers Magny-Cours, 180 km (111.8 mi)

Stage 3 Result

	Rider	Team	Time
1	John Degenkolb (GER)	Giant–Shimano	4h 27' 26"
2	Matthew Goss (AUS)	Orica–GreenEDGE	s.t.
3	José Joaquín Rojas (ESP)	Movistar Team	s.t.
4	Borut Božič (SLO)	Astana	s.t.
5	Tom Boonen (BEL)	Omega Pharma–Quick-Step	s.t.
6	Alexander Kristoff (NOR)	Team Katusha	s.t.
7	Nacer Bouhanni (FRA)	FDJ.fr	s.t.
8	Thor Hushovd (NOR)	BMC Racing Team	s.t.
9	Gert Steegmans (BEL)	Omega Pharma–Quick-Step	s.t.
10	Moreno Hofland (NED)	Belkin Pro Cycling	s.t.

General Classification after Stage 3

	Rider	Team	Time
1	John Degenkolb (GER)	Giant–Shimano	13h 14' 01"
2	Nacer Bouhanni (FRA)	FDJ.fr	+ 8"
3	Moreno Hofland (NED)	Belkin Pro Cycling	+ 12"
4	José Joaquín Rojas (ESP)	Movistar Team	+ 18"
5	Geraint Thomas (GBR)	Team Sky	+ 21"
6	Bryan Coquard (FRA)	Team Europcar	+ 22"
7	Alexander Kristoff (NOR)	Team Katusha	+ 22"
8	Nikolay Trusov (RUS)	Tinkoff–Saxo	+ 22"
9	Samuel Dumoulin (FRA)	Ag2r–La Mondiale	+ 22"
10	Marco Marcato (ITA)	Cannondale	+ 22"

=== Stage 4 ===
12 March 2014 — Nevers to Belleville, 201.5 km (125.2 mi)

Stage 4 Result

	Rider	Team	Time
1	Tom-Jelte Slagter (NED)	Garmin–Sharp	5h 00' 09"
2	Geraint Thomas (GBR)	Team Sky	s.t.
3	Wilco Kelderman (NED)	Belkin Pro Cycling	+ 5"
4	Michael Matthews (AUS)	Orica–GreenEDGE	+ 5"
5	Zdeněk Štybar (CZE)	Omega Pharma–Quick-Step	+ 5"
6	Arthur Vichot (FRA)	FDJ.fr	+ 5"
7	Peter Velits (SVK)	BMC Racing Team	+ 5"
8	José Joaquín Rojas (ESP)	Movistar Team	+ 5"
9	Cyril Gautier (FRA)	Team Europcar	+ 5"
10	Samuel Dumoulin (FRA)	Ag2r–La Mondiale	+ 5"

General Classification after Stage 4

	Rider	Team	Time
1	Geraint Thomas (GBR)	Team Sky	18h 14' 25"
2	John Degenkolb (GER)	Giant–Shimano	+ 3"
3	Tom-Jelte Slagter (NED)	Garmin–Sharp	+ 4"
4	José Joaquín Rojas (ESP)	Movistar Team	+ 8"
5	Samuel Dumoulin (FRA)	Ag2r–La Mondiale	+ 12"
6	Wilco Kelderman (NED)	Belkin Pro Cycling	+ 15"
7	Carlos Betancur (COL)	Ag2r–La Mondiale	+ 17"
8	Zdeněk Štybar (CZE)	Omega Pharma–Quick-Step	+ 19"
9	Cyril Gautier (FRA)	Team Europcar	+ 19"
10	Arnold Jeannesson (FRA)	FDJ.fr	+ 19"

=== Stage 5 ===
13 March 2014 — Crêches-sur-Saône to Rive-de-Gier, 153 km (95.1 mi)

Stage 5 Result

	Rider	Team	Time
1	Carlos Betancur (COL)	Ag2r–La Mondiale	3h 38' 15"
2	Bob Jungels (LUX)	Trek Factory Racing	s.t.
3	Jakob Fuglsang (DEN)	Astana	s.t.
4	Bryan Coquard (FRA)	Team Europcar	+ 2"
5	Tom Boonen (BEL)	Omega Pharma–Quick-Step	+ 2"
6	Reinardt Janse van Rensburg (RSA)	Giant–Shimano	+ 2"
7	Tony Gallopin (FRA)	Lotto–Belisol	+ 2"
8	Greg Van Avermaet (BEL)	BMC Racing Team	+ 2"
9	Borut Božič (SLO)	Astana	+ 2"
10	Marco Marcato (ITA)	Cannondale	+ 2"

General Classification after Stage 5

	Rider	Team	Time
1	Geraint Thomas (GBR)	Team Sky	21h 52' 42"
2	John Degenkolb (GER)	Giant–Shimano	+ 3"
3	Tom-Jelte Slagter (NED)	Garmin–Sharp	+ 4"
4	Carlos Betancur (COL)	Ag2r–La Mondiale	+ 5"
5	José Joaquín Rojas (ESP)	Movistar Team	+ 8"
6	Jakob Fuglsang (DEN)	Astana	+ 13"
7	Jan Bakelants (BEL)	Omega Pharma–Quick-Step	+ 13"
8	Wilco Kelderman (NED)	Belkin Pro Cycling	+ 15"
9	Zdeněk Štybar (CZE)	Omega Pharma–Quick-Step	+ 19"
10	Cyril Gautier (FRA)	Team Europcar	+ 19"

=== Stage 6 ===
14 March 2014 — Saint-Saturnin-lès-Avignon to Fayence, 221.5 km (137.6 mi)

Stage 6 Result

	Rider	Team	Time
1	Carlos Betancur (COL)	Ag2r–La Mondiale	5h 12' 11"
2	Rui Costa (POR)	Lampre–Merida	s.t.
3	Zdeněk Štybar (CZE)	Omega Pharma–Quick-Step	+ 3"
4	Geraint Thomas (GBR)	Team Sky	+ 3"
5	Arthur Vichot (FRA)	FDJ.fr	+ 3"
6	Cyril Gautier (FRA)	Team Europcar	+ 7"
7	Jakob Fuglsang (DEN)	Astana	+ 7"
8	Tony Gallopin (FRA)	Lotto–Belisol	+ 7"
9	Stefan Denifl (AUT)	IAM Cycling	+ 7"
10	Gorka Izagirre (ESP)	Movistar Team	+ 11"

General Classification after Stage 6

	Rider	Team	Time
1	Carlos Betancur (COL)	Ag2r–La Mondiale	27h 04' 48"
2	Geraint Thomas (GBR)	Team Sky	+ 8"
3	Rui Costa (POR)	Lampre–Merida	+ 18"
4	Zdeněk Štybar (CZE)	Omega Pharma–Quick-Step	+ 22"
5	José Joaquín Rojas (ESP)	Movistar Team	+ 24"
6	Jakob Fuglsang (DEN)	Astana	+ 25"
7	Arthur Vichot (FRA)	FDJ.fr	+ 27"
8	Jan Bakelants (BEL)	Omega Pharma–Quick-Step	+ 29"
9	Cyril Gautier (FRA)	Team Europcar	+ 31"
10	Stefan Denifl (AUT)	IAM Cycling	+ 31"

=== Stage 7 ===
15 March 2014 — Mougins to Biot–Sophia Antipolis, 195.5 km (121.5 mi)

Stage 7 Result

	Rider	Team	Time
1	Tom-Jelte Slagter (NED)	Garmin–Sharp	5h 00' 05"
2	Rui Costa (POR)	Lampre–Merida	s.t.
3	Carlos Betancur (COL)	Ag2r–La Mondiale	s.t.
4	José Joaquín Rojas (ESP)	Movistar Team	s.t.
5	Arthur Vichot (FRA)	FDJ.fr	s.t.
6	Tony Gallopin (FRA)	Lotto–Belisol	s.t.
7	Stefan Denifl (AUT)	IAM Cycling	s.t.
8	Zdeněk Štybar (CZE)	Omega Pharma–Quick-Step	s.t.
9	Jakob Fuglsang (DEN)	Astana	s.t.
10	Peter Velits (SVK)	BMC Racing Team	s.t.

General Classification after Stage 7

	Rider	Team	Time
1	Carlos Betancur (COL)	Ag2r–La Mondiale	32h 04' 49"
2	Rui Costa (POR)	Lampre–Merida	+ 14"
3	Zdeněk Štybar (CZE)	Omega Pharma–Quick-Step	+ 26"
4	José Joaquín Rojas (ESP)	Movistar Team	+ 27"
5	Jakob Fuglsang (DEN)	Astana	+ 29"
6	Arthur Vichot (FRA)	FDJ.fr	+ 31"
7	Cyril Gautier (FRA)	Team Europcar	+ 35"
8	Stefan Denifl (AUT)	IAM Cycling	+ 35"
9	Peter Velits (SVK)	BMC Racing Team	+ 39"
10	Simon Špilak (SLO)	Team Katusha	+ 39"

=== Stage 8 ===
16 March 2014 — Nice to Nice, 128 km (79.5 mi)

Stage 8 Result

	Rider	Team	Time
1	Arthur Vichot (FRA)	FDJ.fr	3h 06' 56"
2	José Joaquín Rojas (ESP)	Movistar Team	s.t.
3	Cyril Gautier (FRA)	Team Europcar	s.t.
4	Damiano Caruso (ITA)	Cannondale	s.t.
5	Wilco Kelderman (NED)	Belkin Pro Cycling	s.t.
6	Fränk Schleck (LUX)	Trek Factory Racing	s.t.
7	Tom-Jelte Slagter (NED)	Garmin–Sharp	s.t.
8	Carlos Betancur (COL)	Ag2r–La Mondiale	s.t.
9	George Bennett (NZL)	Cannondale	s.t.
10	Eduardo Sepúlveda (ARG)	Bretagne–Séché Environnement	s.t.

Final General Classification

	Rider	Team	Time
1	Carlos Betancur (COL)	Ag2r–La Mondiale	35h 11' 45"
2	Rui Costa (POR)	Lampre–Merida	+ 14"
3	Arthur Vichot (FRA)	FDJ.fr	+ 20"
4	José Joaquín Rojas (ESP)	Movistar Team	+ 21"
5	Jakob Fuglsang (DEN)	Astana	+ 29"
6	Cyril Gautier (FRA)	Team Europcar	+ 31"
7	Stefan Denifl (AUT)	IAM Cycling	+ 35"
8	Simon Špilak (SLO)	Team Katusha	+ 36"
9	Peter Velits (SVK)	BMC Racing Team	+ 39"
10	Tony Gallopin (FRA)	Lotto–Belisol	+ 41"

== Classification leadership table ==
Stage	Winner	General classification	Points classification	Mountains classification	Young rider classification	Teams classification
1	Nacer Bouhanni	Nacer Bouhanni	Nacer Bouhanni	Christophe Laborie	Nacer Bouhanni	Omega Pharma–Quick-Step
2	Moreno Hofland	Nacer Bouhanni	Nacer Bouhanni	Christophe Laborie	Nacer Bouhanni	Team Katusha
3	John Degenkolb	John Degenkolb	John Degenkolb	Christophe Laborie	John Degenkolb	Team Katusha
4	Tom-Jelte Slagter	Geraint Thomas	John Degenkolb	Valerio Agnoli	John Degenkolb	Ag2r–La Mondiale
5	Carlos Betancur	Geraint Thomas	John Degenkolb	Sylvain Chavanel	John Degenkolb	Ag2r–La Mondiale
6	Carlos Betancur	Carlos Betancur	John Degenkolb	Sylvain Chavanel	Carlos Betancur	Movistar Team
7	Tom-Jelte Slagter	Carlos Betancur	John Degenkolb	Pim Ligthart	Carlos Betancur	Movistar Team
8	Arthur Vichot	Carlos Betancur	John Degenkolb	Pim Ligthart	Carlos Betancur	Movistar Team
Final		Carlos Betancur	John Degenkolb	Pim Ligthart	Carlos Betancur	Movistar Team

Notes

- In stage 2, Gianni Meersman, who was second in the points classification, wore the green jersey, because Nacer Bouhanni (in first place) wore the yellow jersey as leader of the general classification during that stage. Similarly, John Degenkolb, who was second in the young rider classification, wore the white jersey, as Bouhanni also led that classification.
- In stage 3, John Degenkolb, who was second in the points classification, wore the green jersey, because Nacer Bouhanni (in first place) wore the yellow jersey as leader of the general classification during that stage. Similarly, Moreno Hofland, who was third in the young rider classification, wore the white jersey, due to Bouhanni and Degenkolb (who was also second in the young rider classification) wearing other jerseys.
