= Cyril Gautier =

French road bicycle racer

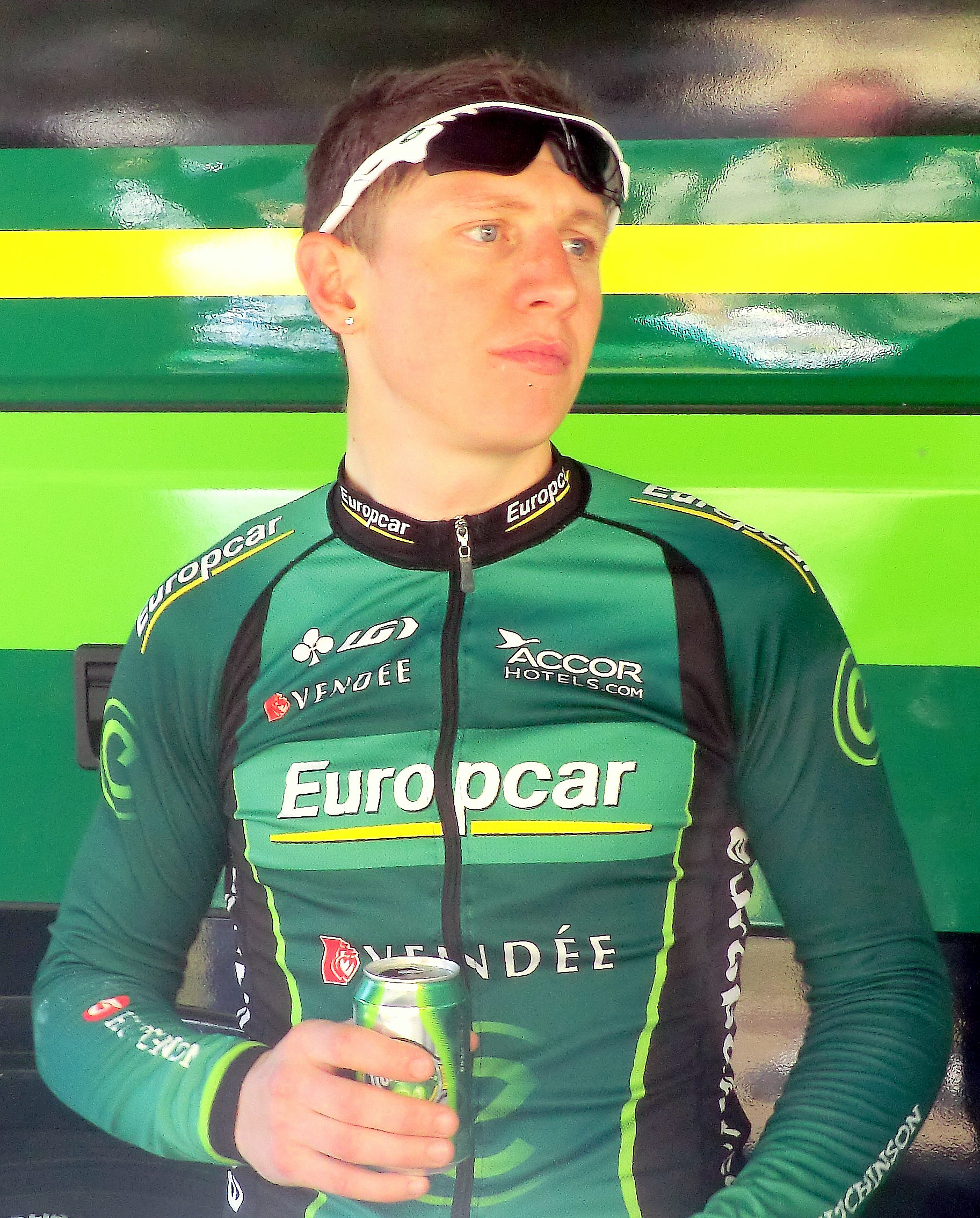
- Gautier at the 2013 Critérium du Dauphiné

Personal information
- Full name: Cyril Gautier
- Born: 26 September 1987 (age 39) Plouagat, France
- Height: 1.68 m (5 ft 6 in)
- Weight: 64 kg (141 lb; 10.1 st)

Cycling career
- Sport: Cycling
- Disciplines: Road; Track
- Role: Rider
- Rider type: Puncheur

Amateur teams
- 2001: GA Guingamp
- 2002–2003: VC Quintin
- 2004: CC Moncontour
- 2005: Côtes d'Armor–Maître Jacques Junior
- 2006: Côtes d'Armor–Maître Jacques

Professional teams
- 2007–2008: Bretagne–Armor Lux
- 2009–2015: Bbox Bouygues Telecom
- 2016–2018: AG2R La Mondiale
- 2019–2022: Vital Concept–B&B Hotels

Cyril Gautier (born 26 September 1987) is a French road bicycle racer, who competed as a professional from 2007 to 2022. He was named in the start list for the 2015 Vuelta a España.

In August 2015, L'Équipe reported Gautier had signed for AG2R La Mondiale for the 2016 season, providing support for Romain Bardet.

== Major results ==
2004
4th Overall Giro della Lunigiana
10th Road race, UCI Junior Road World Championships
2006
7th Overall Grand Prix Guillaume Tell
2007
3rd Grand Prix de Rennes
4th Overall Grand Prix du Portugal

1st Young rider classification

8th Tour du Finistère
2008
1st Road race, UEC European Under-23 Road Championships
1st Stage 2 Kreiz Breizh Elites
2nd Grand Prix de Plumelec-Morbihan
6th Road race, UCI Under-23 Road World Championships
6th Grand Prix d'Isbergues
7th Trophée des Grimpeurs
2009
6th Grand Prix de Plumelec-Morbihan
7th Overall Tour du Limousin
9th Overall Circuit de Lorraine
2010
1st Route Adélie de Vitré
3rd Les Boucles du Sud-Ardèche
2011
3rd Les Boucles du Sud-Ardèche
5th Boucles de l'Aulne
6th Overall Étoile de Bessèges
6th Grand Prix d'Ouverture La Marseillaise
2012
1st Young rider classification, Critérium International
2013
1st Tour du Finistère
5th Overall Étoile de Bessèges
2014
4th Overall Tour du Limousin

1st Stage 2

4th GP Ouest-France
6th Overall Paris–Nice
6th Classic Sud-Ardèche
7th Overall Tour du Haut Var
Combativity award Stage 16 Tour de France
2015
4th La Drôme Classic
6th Overall Étoile de Bessèges
2016
1st Paris–Camembert
1st Mountains classification, La Méditerranéenne
2017
Volta a la Comunitat Valenciana

1st Sprints classification
1st Mountains classification

1st Stage 3 Tour du Limousin
2nd Route Adélie de Vitré
5th Trofeo Laigueglia
2019
1st Mountains classification, Tour du Haut Var
9th Trofeo Matteotti
2020
9th Malaysian International Classic Race
2021
8th La Drôme Classic

=== Grand Tour general classification results timeline ===
Grand Tour	2010	2011	2012	2013	2014	2015	2016	2017	2018	2019	2020	2021
Giro d'Italia	Did not contest during his career											
Tour de France	45	43	61	32	25	34	68	48	—	—	78	81
Vuelta a España	—	—	—	—	—	58	—	—	—	—	—	—
