= 2017 Klasika Primavera =

2017 UCI Europe Tour

Race details
- Dates: 9 April 2017
- Stages: 1
- Distance: 171.5 km (106.6 mi)
- Winning time: 4h 01' 43"

Results
	Winner	Gorka Izagirre (ESP)	(Movistar Team)
	Second	Wilmar Paredes (COL)	(Team Manzana Postobón)
	Third	Rui Vinhas (POR)	(W52 / FC Porto / Mestre da Cor)

The 63rd edition of the Klasika Primavera, a one-day road cycling race, was held on 9 April 2017. It was part of the 2017 UCI Europe Tour as a category 1.1 event.

== Teams ==
Twelve teams started the race. Each team had a maximum of eight riders:

UCI WorldTeams

- Movistar Team

UCI Professional Continental teams

- Caja Rural–Seguros RGA
- Team Manzana Postobón

UCI Continental teams

- Burgos BH
- Equipo Bolivia
- Inteja Dominican Cycling Team
- Sporting / Tavira
- W52 / FC Porto / Mestre da Cor
- Dare Viator Partizan
- Euskadi Basque Country–Murias
- Massi–Kuwait Cycling Project
- Team Ukyo

== Result ==
The race was won by the Spanish cyclist Gorka Izagirre of Movistar Team.

Final general classification

Rank	Rider	Team	Time
1	Gorka Izagirre (ESP)	Movistar Team	4h 01' 43"
2	Wilmar Paredes (COL)	Team Manzana Postobón	+ 6"
3	Rui Vinhas (POR)	W52 / FC Porto / Mestre da Cor	s.t.
4	Salvador Guardiola (ESP)	Team Ukyo	s.t.
5	Óscar Pujol (ESP)	Team Ukyo	s.t.
6	Nick Schultz (AUS)	Caja Rural–Seguros RGA	s.t.
7	Ibai Salas (ESP)	Burgos BH	s.t.
8	Garikoitz Bravo (ESP)	Euskadi Basque Country–Murias	s.t.
9	Eduard Prades (ESP)	Caja Rural–Seguros RGA	+ 21"
10	Jesús Herrada (ESP)	Movistar Team	s.t.
