= Ricardo García Ambroa =

Spanish bicycle racer

Ricardo García
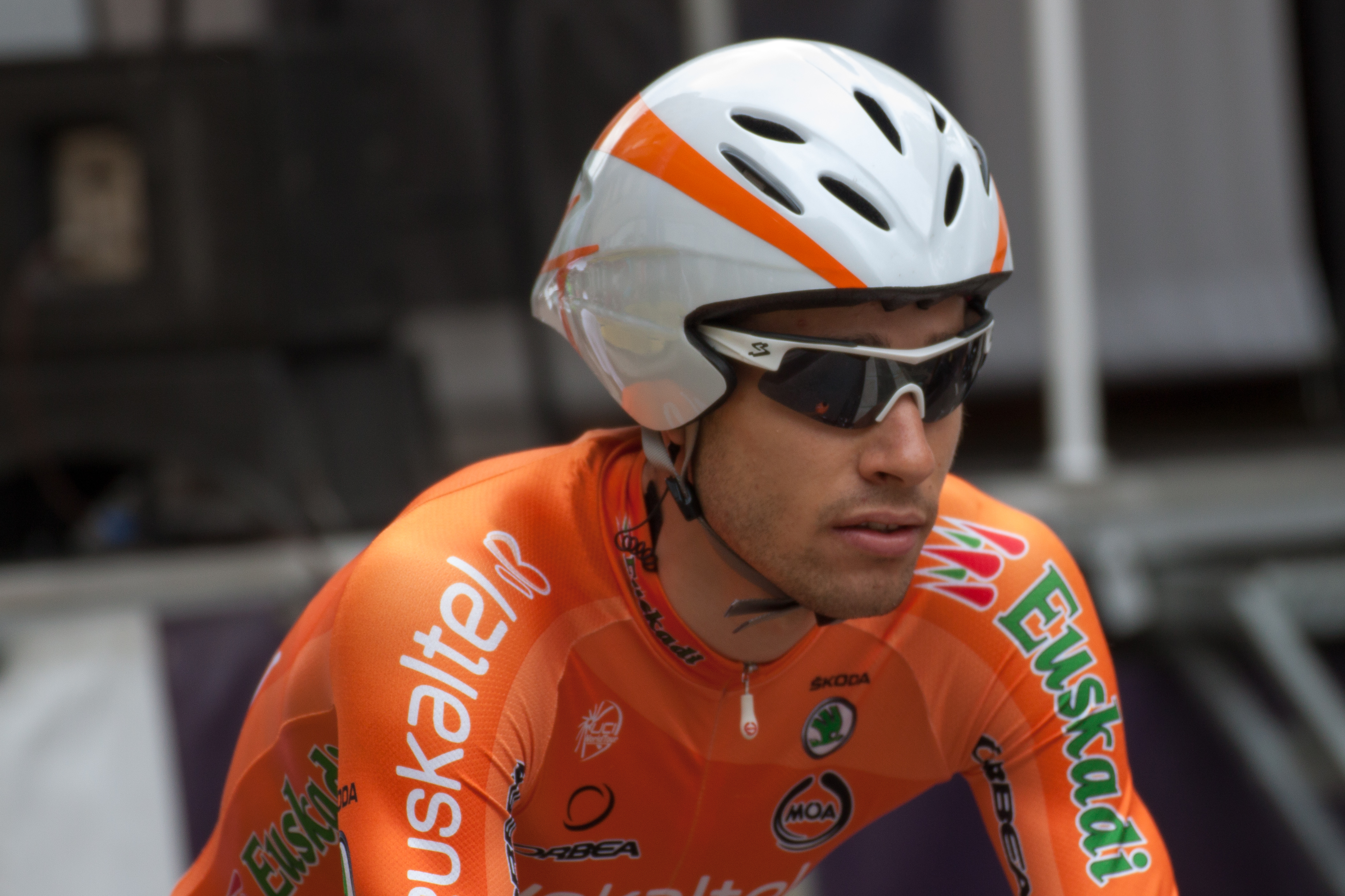
- García at the 2012 Critérium du Dauphiné

Personal information
- Full name: Ricardo García Ambroa
- Born: 26 February 1988 (age 38) Vitoria-Gasteiz, Spain
- Height: 1.83 m (6 ft 0 in)
- Weight: 68 kg (150 lb)

Cycling career
- Sport: Cycling
- Current team: Retired
- Discipline: Road
- Role: Rider

Professional teams
- 2009–2011: Orbea
- 2012–2013: Euskaltel–Euskadi
- 2014: Team UKYO
- 2015–2017: Kinan Cycling Team
- 2018: Fundación Euskadi

Ricardo García Ambroa (born 26 February 1988) is a Spanish former professional road cyclist.

== Major results ==
2011
1st Stage 2 Cinturó de l'Empordà
5th Overall Volta ao Alentejo
6th Overall Troféu Joaquim Agostinho
8th Overall Vuelta a Castilla y León
10th Circuito de Getxo
2014
9th Overall Tour de Kumano
2015
9th Overall Tour de Singkarak
2016
2nd Overall Tour de Ijen
3rd Overall Tour de Hokkaido
3rd Overall Tour de Singkarak

1st Stage 3

3rd Overall Tour de Flores
2017
Tour de Molvccas

1st Mountains classification
1st Stage 3

5th Overall Tour de Lombok
