= Trittico Lombardo =

Cycling competition in Italy

Trittico Lombardo logo

The "Trittico Regione Lombardia" (Italian for "Lombardy Region Triptych"), usually also called Trittico Lombardo, is a cycling competition which includes three cycling races held around the region of Lombardy on three consecutive days. These races are Tre Valli Varesine, Coppa Ugo Agostoni, and Coppa Bernocchi, the winner having the best overall results in these three races.

In 2020, as a consequence of COVID-19 pandemic, the three races were united into one to form the Gran Trittico Lombardo.

== Winners ==
Year	Country	Rider	Team
1997	Italy	Giovanni Lombardi	
1998	Italy	Mirko Celestino	
1999	Italy	Sergio Barbero	
2000	Lithuania	Raimondas Rumšas	
2001	Italy	Gianluca Tonetti	
2002	Italy	Eddy Ratti	
2003	Italy	Massimo Giunti	
2004	Italy	Leonardo Bertagnolli	
2005	Italy	Lorenzo Bernucci	
2006	Italy	Andrea Tonti	
2007	Italy	Alessandro Bertolini	
2008	Italy	Leonardo Bertagnolli	
2009	Italy	Mauro Santambrogio	
2010	Italy	Francesco Gavazzi	
2011	Belarus	Yauheni Hutarovich	
2012	Canada	David Veilleux	Team Europcar
2013	Italy	Simone Ponzi	Astana
2014	Italy	Simone Ponzi	Neri Sottoli
2015	Italy	Vincenzo Nibali	Astana
2016	Italy	Sonny Colbrelli	Bardiani–CSF
2017	Switzerland	Michael Albasini	GreenEDGE
2018	Latvia	Toms Skujiņš	Trek–Segafredo
2019	Italy	Giovanni Visconti	Neri Sottoli-Selle Italia-KTM
2020	Spain	Gorka Izagirre	Astana
2021	Italy	Alessandro Covi	UAE Team Emirates
2022	Spain	Alejandro Valverde	Movistar Team
2023	Italy	Vincenzo Albanese	Eolo–Kometa

== Winners ==
Year	Coppa Ugo Agostoni	Coppa Bernocchi	Tre Valli Varesine
1997	Massimo Apollonio (ITA)	Gianluca Bortolami (ITA)	Roberto Caruso (ITA)
1998	Andrea Tafi (ITA)	Fabio Sacchi (ITA)	Davide Rebellin (ITA)
1999	Massimo Donati (ITA)	Giancarlo Raimondi (ITA)	Sergio Barbero (ITA)
2000	Jan Ulrich (GER)	Romāns Vainšteins (LAT)	Massimo Donati (ITA)
2001	Francesco Casagrande (ITA)	Paolo Valoti (ITA)	Mirko Celestino (ITA)
2002	Laurent Jalabert (FRA)	Daniele Nardello (ITA)	Eddy Ratti (ITA)
2003	Francesco Casagrande (ITA)	Sergio Barbero (ITA)	Danilo Di Luca (ITA)
2004	Leonardo Bertagnolli (ITA)	Angelo Furlan (ITA)	Fabian Wegmann (GER)
2005	Paolo Valoti (ITA)	Danilo Napolitano (ITA)	Stefano Garzelli (ITA)
2006	Alessandro Bertolini (ITA)	Danilo Napolitano (ITA)	Stefano Garzelli (ITA)
2007	Alessandro Bertolini (ITA)	Danilo Napolitano (ITA)	Christian Murro (ITA)
2008	Linus Gerdemann (GER)	Steve Cummings (GBR)	Francesco Ginanni (ITA)
2009	Giovanni Visconti (ITA)	Luca Paolini (ITA)	Mauro Santambrogio (ITA)
2010	Francesco Gavazzi (ITA)	Manuel Belletti (ITA)	Dan Martin (IRL)
2011	Sacha Modolo (ITA)	Yauheni Hutarovich (BLR)	Davide Rebellin (ITA)
2012	Emanuele Sella (ITA)	Sacha Modolo (ITA)	David Veilleux (CAN)
2013	Filippo Pozzato (ITA)	Sacha Modolo (ITA)	Kristijan Đurasek (CRO)
2014	Niccolò Bonifazio (ITA)	Elia Viviani (ITA)	Michael Albasini (SUI)
2015	Davide Rebellin (ITA)	Vincenzo Nibali (ITA)	Vincenzo Nibali (ITA)
2016	Sonny Colbrelli (ITA)	Giacomo Nizzolo (ITA)	Sonny Colbrelli (ITA)
2017	Michael Albasini (SUI)	Sonny Colbrelli (ITA)	Alexandre Geniez (FRA)
2018	Gianni Moscon (ITA)	Sonny Colbrelli (ITA)	Toms Skujiņš (LAT)
2019	Alexandr Riabushenko (BLR)	Phil Bauhaus (GER)	Primož Roglič (SLO)
2020	Separate races not held, 2020 Gran Trittico Lombardo held instead		
2021	Alexey Lutsenko (KAZ)	Remco Evenepoel (BEL)	Alessandro De Marchi (ITA)
2022	Sjoerd Bax (NED)	Davide Ballerini (ITA)	Tadej Pogačar (SLO)
2023	Davide Formolo (ITA)	Wout van Aert (BEL)	Ilan Van Wilder (BEL)
2024	Marc Hirschi (SUI)	Stan Van Tricht (BEL)	No race

== See also ==
- Ardennes classics
- Trittico di Autunno
