= 2014 Tour du Haut Var =

Race details
- Dates: 22–23 February 2014
- Stages: 2
- Distance: 352.5 km (219.0 mi)
- Winning time: 9h 05' 30"

Results
	Winner	Carlos Betancur (COL)
	Second	Samuel Dumoulin (FRA)
	Third	Amaël Moinard (FRA)

The 2014 Tour du Haut Var was the 46th edition of the Tour du Haut Var cycle race and was held on 22–23 February 2014. The race started in Le Cannet-des-Maures and finished in Draguignan. The race was won by Carlos Betancur.

== General classification ==
Final general classification

Rank	Rider	Time
1	Carlos Betancur (COL)	9h 05' 30"
2	Samuel Dumoulin (FRA)	+ 12"
3	Amaël Moinard (FRA)	+ 12"
4	Armindo Fonseca (FRA)	+ 15"
5	Cadel Evans (AUS)	+ 15"
6	Mikaël Cherel (FRA)	+ 15"
7	Cyril Gautier (FRA)	+ 15"
8	Émilien Viennet (FRA)	+ 16"
9	Jérôme Pineau (FRA)	+ 18"
10	Andrey Amador (CRI)	+ 18"
