= 2020 Gran Trittico Lombardo =

Cycling race in Lombardy

2020 UCI ProSeries

Race details
- Dates: 3 August 2020
- Distance: 199.7 km (124.1 mi)
- Winning time: 4h 41' 02"

Results
	Winner	Gorka Izagirre (ESP)	(Astana)
	Second	Alex Aranburu (ESP)	(Astana)
	Third	Greg Van Avermaet (BEL)	(CCC Team)

The 2020 Gran Trittico Lombardo was a one-day road cycling race held on 3 August 2020. The race was rated as a 1.Pro event on the 2020 UCI ProSeries. Due to the COVID-19 pandemic, the race was created through the merging of the three races that usually make up the Trittico Lombardo. The race started in Legnano and finished in Varese on a 199.7 kilometer course. The race was won solo in heavy rain by the Spaniard Gorka Izagirre of the Astana team.

== Teams ==
Seven UCI WorldTeams, seven UCI ProTeams, six UCI Continental teams and the Italian national team made up the 21 teams that participated in the race. Of the 146 riders that started the race, only 52 finished.

UCI WorldTeams

- Astana
- CCC Team
- Mitchelton–Scott
- Movistar Team
- Team Ineos
- Trek–Segafredo
- UAE Team Emirates

UCI ProTeams

- Arkéa–Samsic
- Alpecin–Fenix
- Androni Giocattoli–Sidermec
- Bardiani–CSF–Faizanè
- Circus–Wanty Gobert
- Gazprom–RusVelo
- Vini Zabù–KTM

UCI Continental Teams

- Amore & Vita–Prodir
- Beltrami TSA–Marchiol
- Colombia Tierra de Atletas–GW Bicicletas
- NTT Continental Cycling Team
- Sangemini–Trevigiani–MG.K Vis
- Team Colpack–Ballan

National teams

- Italy

== Results ==
Result
Rank	Rider	Team	Time
1	Gorka Izagirre (ESP)	Astana	4h 41' 02"
2	Alex Aranburu (ESP)	Astana	+ 27"
3	Greg Van Avermaet (BEL)	CCC Team	+ 27"
4	Michał Kwiatkowski (POL)	Team Ineos	+ 27"
5	Vincenzo Nibali (ITA)	Trek–Segafredo	+ 27"
6	Jan Polanc (SLO)	UAE Team Emirates	+ 27"
7	Nicola Bagioli (ITA)	Androni Giocattoli–Sidermec	+ 27"
8	Louis Vervaeke (BEL)	Alpecin–Fenix	+ 28"
9	Alessandro De Marchi (ITA)	CCC Team	+ 30"
10	Jhonatan Narváez (ECU)	Team Ineos	+ 1' 01"
