= Garikoitz Bravo =

Spanish bicycle racer (born 1989)

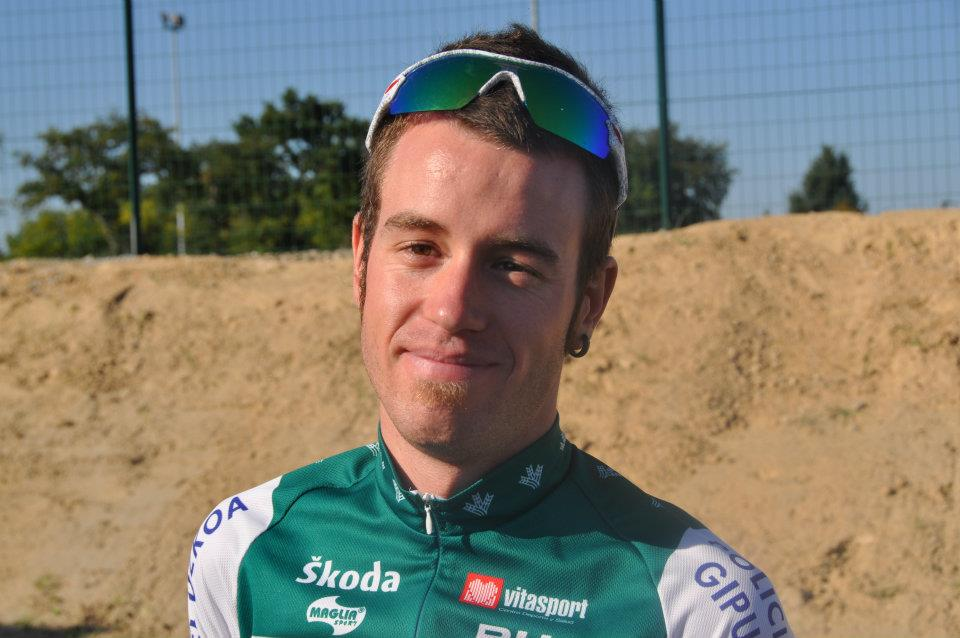
- Bravo in 2011.

Personal information
- Full name: Garikoitz Bravo Oiarbide
- Born: 31 July 1989 (age 37) Lazkao, Spain
- Height: 1.74 m (5 ft 9 in)
- Weight: 61 kg (134 lb)

Cycling career
- Sport: Cycling
- Current team: Retired
- Discipline: Road
- Role: Rider

Amateur teams
- 2008: Azpiru–Ugarte
- 2009: Caja Rural amateur

Professional teams
- 2010–2012: Caja Rural
- 2013: Euskaltel–Euskadi
- 2014: Efapel–Glassdrive
- 2015–2019: Murias Taldea
- 2020–2021: Fundación–Orbea

Garikoitz Bravo Oiarbide (born 31 July 1989 in Lazkao) is a Spanish former cyclist, who competed as a professional from 2010 to 2021. In August 2018, he was named in the startlist for the Vuelta a España.

== Major results ==
2008
1st Stage 1 Bizkaiko Bira
2009
1st Time trial, Basque Country Under-23 Road Championships
2nd Time trial, National Under-23 Road Championships
2011
1st Mountains classification Tour de l'Avenir
2012
9th Vuelta a La Rioja
2013
10th Overall Tour of Beijing
2014
8th Overall Volta ao Alentejo
2015
1st Mountains classification Vuelta a Castilla y León
5th Overall Vuelta a Asturias
8th Overall Tour du Gévaudan Languedoc-Roussillon
8th Prueba Villafranca de Ordizia
2016
4th Overall Vuelta a Asturias
4th Overall Vuelta a la Comunidad de Madrid
8th Overall Vuelta a Castilla y León
8th Prueba Villafranca de Ordizia
10th Vuelta a La Rioja
2017
5th Overall Vuelta a la Comunidad de Madrid
8th Klasika Primavera
9th Overall Volta ao Alentejo
10th Vuelta a Asturias
2018
5th Overall Vuelta a Aragón
7th Grand Prix de Plumelec-Morbihan
2019
6th Overall Vuelta a la Comunidad de Madrid
8th Prueba Villafranca de Ordizia
9th Overall Troféu Joaquim Agostinho
9th Classic Sud-Ardèche
2021
10th Overall Presidential Tour of Turkey

=== Grand Tour general classification results timeline ===
Grand Tour	2018
Giro d'Italia	—
Tour de France	—
Vuelta a España	116

Legend
—	Did not compete
DNF	Did not finish
