= 2016 Vuelta a Castilla y León =

Race details
- Dates: 15–17 April 2016
- Stages: 3
- Distance: 488.3 km (303.4 mi)
- Winning time: 13h 04' 55"

Results
Jersey awarded to the overall winner	Winner	Alejandro Valverde (ESP)	(Movistar Team)
	Second	Pello Bilbao (ESP)	(Caja Rural–Seguros RGA)
	Third	Jóni Brandão (POR)	(Efapel)
Jersey awarded to the points classification winner	Points	Alejandro Valverde (ESP)	(Movistar Team)
Jersey awarded to the mountains classification winner	Mountains	Raúl Alarcón (POR)	(W52 / FC Porto / Porto Canal)
	Combination	Alejandro Valverde (ESP)	(Movistar Team)
	Team	(Spain) Caja Rural-Seguros RGA	

The 2016 Vuelta a Castilla y León was the 31st edition of the Vuelta a Castilla y León cycle race and was held on 15 April to 17 April 2016. The race started in Alcañices and finished at the Alto de la Plataforma. The race was won by Alejandro Valverde.

== General classification ==
Final general classification

Rank	Rider	Time
1	Alejandro Valverde (ESP)	13h 04' 55"
2	Pello Bilbao (ESP)	+ 30"
3	Jóni Brandão (POR)	+ 1' 06"
4	David Arroyo (ESP)	+ 1' 10"
5	Jaime Rosón (ESP)	+ 1' 32"
6	Winner Anacona (COL)	+ 1' 43"
7	Rafael Reis (POR)	+ 1' 43"
8	Garikoitz Bravo (ESP)	+ 2' 23"
9	Carlos Betancur (COL)	+ 2' 51"
10	Linus Gerdemann (GER)	+ 2' 51"
