= Trittico di Autunno =

The Trittico di Autunno is an unofficial trio of cycling classics held in October in northern Italy.

It is not an official competition like its counterpart, the Trittico Lombardo. Three one day races, Milano–Torino, Giro del Piemonte and Giro di Lombardia, are held within a 4-day timeframe in the Lombardy and Piedmont regions. Before 1987, Milano–Torino was organized in the spring, which was also the case in 2005, 2006 and 2007.

Year	Milano–Torino	Giro del Piemonte	Giro di Lombardia
2024	Alberto Bettiol (ITA)	Neilson Powless (USA)	Tadej Pogačar (SLO)
2023	Arvid de Kleijn (NED)	Andrea Bagioli (ITA)	Tadej Pogačar (SLO)
2022	Mark Cavendish (GBR)	Iván García Cortina (ESP)	Tadej Pogačar (SLO)
2021	Primož Roglič (SLO)	Matt Walls (GBR)	Tadej Pogačar (SLO)
2020	Arnaud Démare (FRA)	George Bennett (NZL)	Jakob Fuglsang (DEN)
2019	Michael Woods (CAN)	Egan Bernal (COL)	Bauke Mollema (NED)
2018	Thibaut Pinot (FRA)	Sonny Colbrelli (ITA)	Thibaut Pinot (FRA)
2017	Rigoberto Urán (COL)	Fabio Aru (ITA)	Vincenzo Nibali (ITA)
2016	Miguel Ángel López (COL)	Giacomo Nizzolo (ITA)	Esteban Chaves (COL)
2015	Diego Rosa (ITA)	Jan Bakelants (BEL)	Vincenzo Nibali (ITA)
2014	Giampaolo Caruso (ITA)	-	Daniel Martin (IRL)
2013	Diego Ulissi (ITA)	-	Joaquim Rodríguez (ESP)
2012	Alberto Contador (ESP)	Rigoberto Urán (COL)	Joaquim Rodríguez (ESP)
2011	-	Daniel Moreno (ESP)	Oliver Zaugg (SUI)
2010	-	Philippe Gilbert (BEL)	Philippe Gilbert (BEL)
2009	-	Philippe Gilbert (BEL)	Philippe Gilbert (BEL)
2008	-	Daniele Bennati (ITA)	Damiano Cunego (ITA)
2007	Danilo Di Luca (ITA)	-	Damiano Cunego (ITA)
2006	Igor Astarloa (ESP)	Daniele Bennati (ITA)	Paolo Bettini (ITA)
2005	Fabio Sacchi (ITA)	Murilo Fischer (BRA)	Paolo Bettini (ITA)
2004	Marcos Serrano (ESP)	Allan Davis (AUS)	Damiano Cunego (ITA)
2003	Mirko Celestino (ITA)	Alessandro Bertolini (ITA)	Michele Bartoli (ITA)
2002	Michele Bartoli (ITA)	Luca Paolini (ITA)	Michele Bartoli (ITA)
2001	Mirko Celestino (ITA)	Nico Mattan (BEL)	Danilo Di Luca (ITA)
2000	-	-	Raimondas Rumšas (LTU)
1999	Markus Zberg (SUI)	Andrea Tafi (ITA)	Mirko Celestino (ITA)
1998	Niki Aebersold (SUI)	Marco Serpellini (DEN)	Oscar Camenzind (SUI)
1997	Laurent Jalabert (FRA)	Gianluca Bortolami (ITA)	Laurent Jalabert (FRA)
1996	Stefano Zanini (ITA)	Richard Virenque (FRA)	Andrea Tafi (ITA)
1995	Daniele Nardello (ITA)	Claudio Chiappucci (ITA)	Gianni Faresin (ITA)
1994	Francesco Casagrande (ITA)	Nicola Miceli (ITA)	Vladislav Bobrik (RUS)
1993	Rolf Sørensen (DEN)	Beat Zberg (SUI)	Pascal Richard (SUI)
1992	Gianni Bugno (ITA)	Erik Breukink (NED)	Tony Rominger (SUI)
1991	Davide Cassani (ITA)	Djamolidine Abdoujaparov (URS)	Sean Kelly (IRL)
1990	Mauro Gianetti (ITA)	Franco Ballerini (ITA)	Gilles Delion (FRA)
1989	Rolf Gölz (FRG)	Claudio Chiappucci (ITA)	Tony Rominger (SUI)
1988	Rolf Gölz (FRG)	Rolf Gölz (FRG)	Charly Mottet (FRA)
1987	Phil Anderson (AUS)	Adri van der Poel (NED)	Moreno Argentin (ITA)
