= Carlos Betancur =

Colombian road racing cyclist

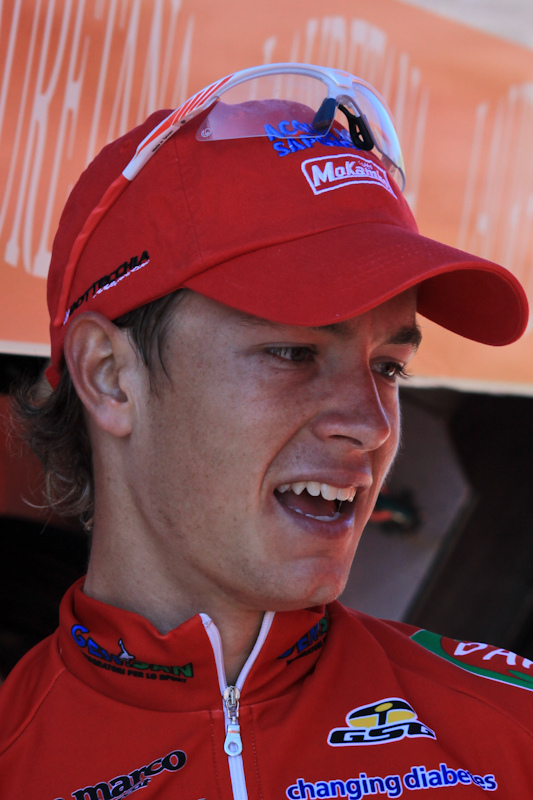
- Betancur at the 2011 Giro d'Italia

Personal information
- Full name: Carlos Alberto Betancur Gómez
- Nicknames: La Ronca, Bananito
- Born: 13 October 1989 (age 37) Ciudad Bolívar, Colombia
- Height: 1.67 m (5 ft 5 1/2 in)
- Weight: 60 kg (132 lb)

Cycling career
- Sport: Cycling
- Discipline: Road
- Role: Rider
- Rider type: Climber

Amateur team
- 2021: Colombia Tierra de Atletas–GW Bicicletas

Professional teams
- 2011–2012: Acqua & Sapone
- 2013–2015: Ag2r–La Mondiale
- 2016–2020: Movistar Team

Major wins
- Grand Tours Giro d'Italia Young rider classification (2013) Stage races Paris–Nice (2014) Single-day races and Classics Giro dell'Emilia (2011)
Medal record
Representing Colombia
Men's road bicycle racing
World Championships
Silver medal – second place	2009 Mendrisio	Under-23 road rade

Carlos Alberto Betancur Gómez (born 13 October 1989) is a Colombian road racing cyclist, who most recently rode for Colombian amateur team Colombia Tierra de Atletas–GW Bicicletas.

== Career ==
In 2010 he won the Girobio stage race; the amateur version of the Giro d'Italia; and in 2011 he won his first professional race at the Giro dell'Emilia.

Betancur had been scheduled to join the Liquigas–Cannondale team in 2012, but remained with Acqua & Sapone. Betancur left Acqua & Sapone at the end of the 2012 season, and joined Ag2r–La Mondiale on a two-year contract from the 2013 season onwards.

=== Ag2r–La Mondiale (2013–15) ===
He started his 2013 season with a seventh-place finish at the Tour of the Basque Country, including a second place on stage 3. He went on to light up the Ardennes Classics, coming 3rd at La Flèche Wallonne after an early attack with just over 500 metres (1,600 feet) to go and scoring a 4th place in Liège–Bastogne–Liège, where it was his attack which created the final select group of six who contested the finish.

After a 12th-place finish at the Tour de Romandie, Betancur went in to the Giro d'Italia as an outsider for a top 10 GC position. Initially things went poorly, as he lost time on the descent of stage 3 and on the long time trial of stage 8, by the end of which he was down in 28th position, 6:08 down on the leader and eventual winner Nibali. However, following second places on stages 9, 10, and 15, and some brilliant performances in the other mountain stages, he worked himself up to 7th place and just two seconds off the white jersey for the best young rider (which he had actually gained on stage 15, but lost in the stage 18 time trial) by the penultimate stage. On the final mountain stage, although he punctured at the bottom of the final climb, he managed to catch up and overtake most of his GC rivals, finishing 4th on the day. He ended the Giro as best young rider and 5th in the general Classification.

In December 2013, Betancur confirmed he would be focusing on the Tour de France for 2014. However, he failed to fly from his training base in Colombia to France on 3 June, blaming a viral infection, and changed his target to the Vuelta a España.

In August 2015 AG2R La Mondiale announced that they had come to an agreement with Betancur to release him from his contract with the team, which was due to run until the end of 2016.

=== Movistar Team (2016–20) ===
In October 2015, the Movistar Team announced that they had agreed an initial two-year deal with Betancur from 2016. Betancur won his first race for the team – the first stage of the 2016 Vuelta a Castilla y León – ending a 760-day wait for a victory. The last race he had won was the 2014 Paris–Nice.

In June 2017, he was named in the startlist for the 2017 Tour de France.

=== Colombia Tierra de Atletas–GW Bicicletas ===
For the 2021 season, Betancur joined the Colombia Tierra de Atletas–GW Bicicletas team. In April, he announced that he was taking a break from cycling.

== Major results ==
2009
1st Overall Vuelta de la Juventud de Colombia

1st Stage 4

2nd Road race, UCI Road World Under-23 Championships
2010
1st Overall Girobio

1st Stages 4 & 5

1st Stage 1 (TTT) Vuelta a Colombia
2011
1st Giro dell'Emilia
5th Gran Premio Industria e Commercio Artigianato Carnaghese
9th Giro di Lombardia
2012
1st Trofeo Melinda
1st Stage 5 Tour of Belgium
1st Mountains classification, Circuit de Lorraine
2nd Giro di Toscana
4th Overall Giro del Trentino

1st Young rider classification

4th Overall Four Days of Dunkirk
5th Milano–Torino
5th Gran Piemonte
7th Circuito de Getxo
8th Overall Monviso-Venezia

1st Young rider classification
1st Stage 5

8th Trofeo Matteotti
9th GP Industria & Artigianato di Larciano
2013
3rd La Flèche Wallonne
4th Liège–Bastogne–Liège
5th Overall Giro d'Italia

1st Young rider classification

7th Overall Tour of the Basque Country
2014
1st Overall Paris–Nice

1st Young rider classification
1st Stages 5 & 6

1st Overall Tour du Haut Var

1st Points classification
1st Stage 1

2016
1st Stage 2 Vuelta a Asturias
9th Overall Vuelta a Castilla y León

1st Stage 1

2018
4th Klasika Primavera
5th GP Miguel Induráin
2019
1st Klasika Primavera
8th Overall Tour de Suisse

=== General classification results timeline ===
Grand Tour general classification results
Grand Tour	2011	2012	2013	2014	2015	2016	2017	2018	2019
Giro d'Italia	58	—	5	—	20	DNF	—	15	—
Tour de France	—	—	—	—	—	—	18	—	—
Vuelta a España	—	—	126	158	—	—	DNF	—	—
Major stage race general classification results
Major stage race	2011	2012	2013	2014	2015	2016	2017	2018	2019
Paris–Nice	—	—	—	1	—	—	—	—	—
Tirreno–Adriatico	—	44	—	—	116	—	—	—	—
Volta a Catalunya	—	—	46	DNS	DNF	—	—	—	—
Tour of the Basque Country	—	—	7	DNF	98	—	—	27	DNF
Tour de Romandie	—	—	13	—	DNF	—	43	DNF	11
Critérium du Dauphiné	Has not contested during his career								
Tour de Suisse	—	—	—	—	—	—	17	—	8
