= Fabrice Jeandesboz =

French cyclist

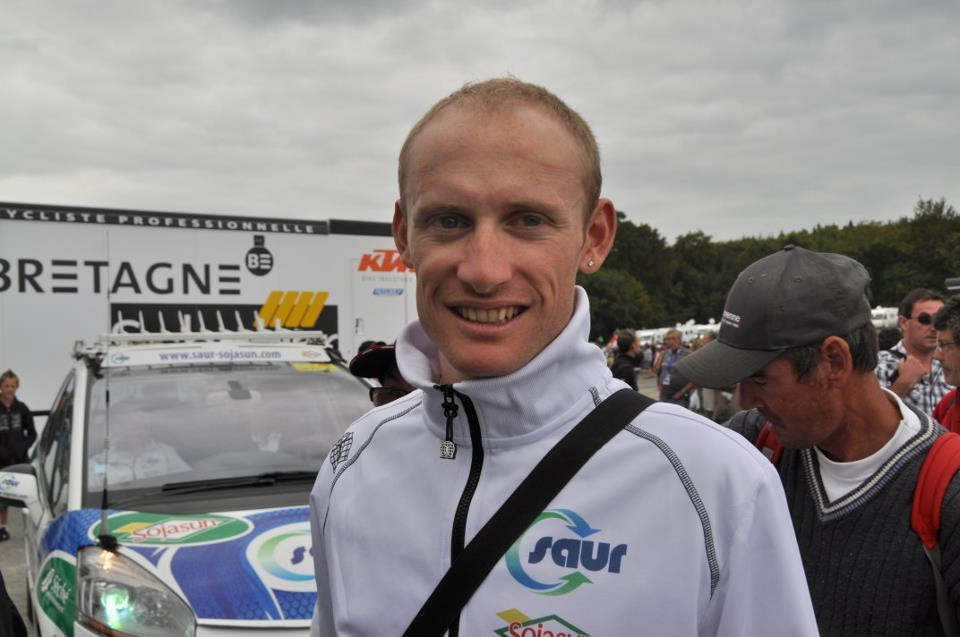
- Jeandesboz at the 2011 GP Ouest-France

Personal information
- Full name: Fabrice Jeandesboz
- Born: 4 December 1984 (age 41) Loudéac, France
- Height: 1.79 m (5 ft 10 1/2 in)
- Weight: 67 kg (148 lb)

Cycling career
- Sport: Cycling
- Current team: Retired
- Disciplines: Road; Track
- Role: Rider
- Rider type: Climber

Amateur teams
- 2002: Stade de Lamballe
- 2003–2006: Côtes d'Armor–CC Moncontour
- 2005: Française des Jeux (stagiaire)
- 2006: Française des Jeux (stagiaire)
- 2007–2008: Vendée U
- 2007: Bouygues Télécom (stagiaire)
- 2008: Bouygues Télécom (stagiaire)

Professional teams
- 2009–2013: Besson Chaussures–Sojasun
- 2014–2017: Team Europcar

Fabrice Jeandesboz (born 4 December 1984) is a French former road and track cyclist, who competed professionally between 2009 and 2017 for the Sojasun and Direct Énergie teams.

Jeandesboz joined Team Europcar for the 2014 season, after his previous team – Sojasun – folded at the end of the 2013 season. He was named in the start list for the 2015 Vuelta a España.

== Major results ==
2004
3rd Paris–Mantes-en-Yvelines
8th Chrono Champenois
2005
1st Individual pursuit, National Under-23 Track Championships
3rd Overall Critérium des Espoirs
2007
2nd Overall Tour de Gironde
2010
1st Prologue (TTT) Tour Alsace
6th Classic Loire Atlantique
7th Overall Tour de l'Ain
2011
5th Overall Vuelta a Burgos
7th Overall Vuelta a Murcia
8th Overall Tour Méditerranéen
9th Les Boucles du Sud-Ardèche
2012
4th Overall Tour du Gévaudan Languedoc-Roussillon
7th Klasika Primavera
8th Overall Tour Méditerranéen
2013
5th Les Boucles du Sud-Ardèche
8th Overall Vuelta a Castilla y León
10th Overall Route du Sud
2014
6th Overall La Tropicale Amissa Bongo
2015
2nd Overall Rhône-Alpes Isère Tour

1st Stage 3

2nd Polynormande
6th Overall Tour de l'Ain

=== Grand Tour general classification results timeline ===
Grand Tour	2011	2012	2013	2014	2015	2016
Giro d'Italia	Did not contest during his career					
Tour de France	124	54	—	—	—	60
Vuelta a España	—	—	—	—	17	DNF

Legend
—	Did not compete
DNF	Did not finish
