= Francisco Ventoso =

Spanish road bicycle racer (born 1982)

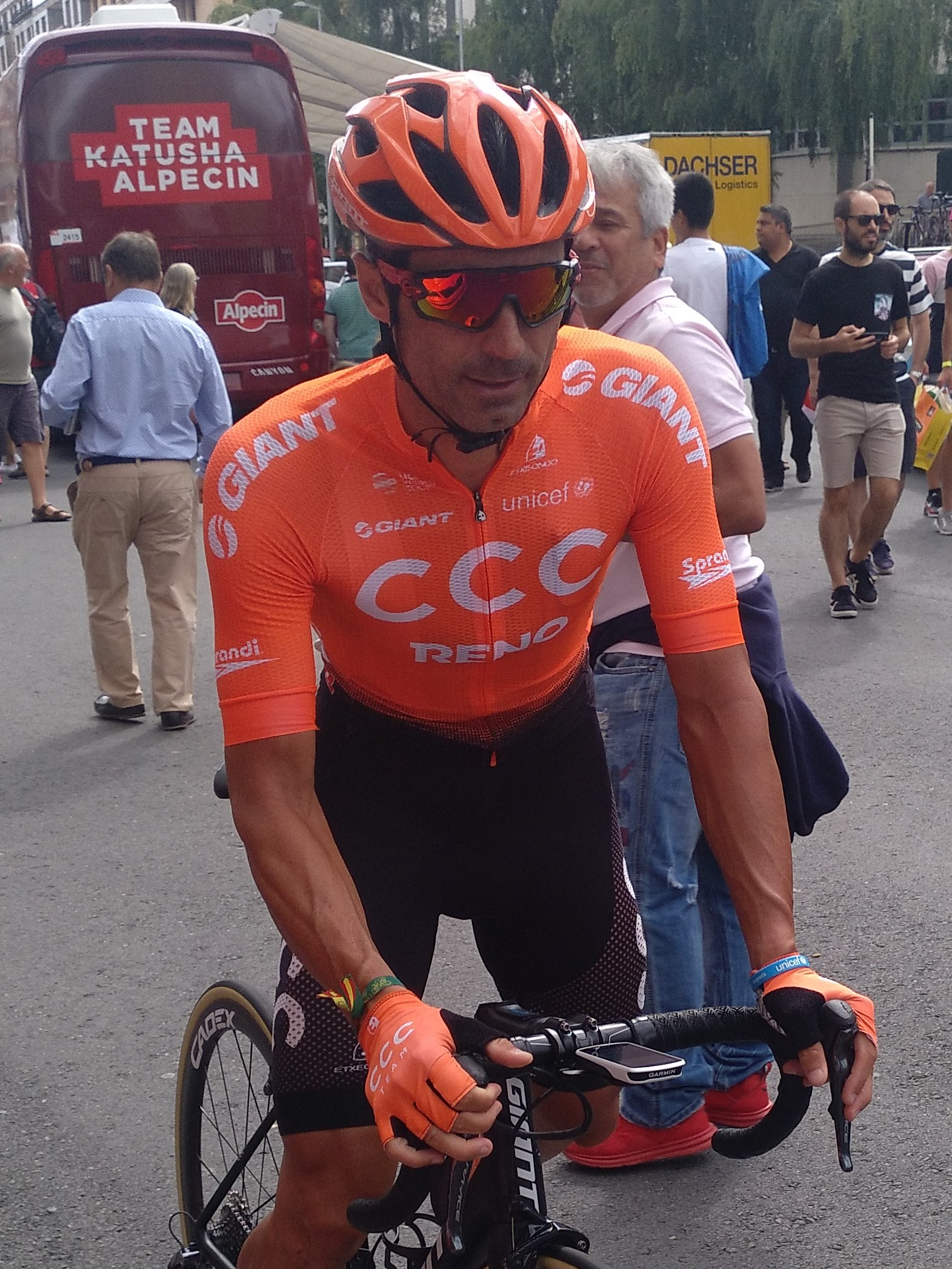
- Ventoso at the 2019 Vuelta a España

Personal information
- Full name: Francisco José Ventoso Alberdi
- Nickname: Fran
- Born: 6 May 1982 (age 44) Reinosa, Spain
- Height: 1.80 m (5 ft 11 in)
- Weight: 76 kg (168 lb)

Cycling career
- Sport: Cycling
- Discipline: Road
- Role: Rider
- Rider type: Sprinter

Professional teams
- 2004–2007: Saunier Duval–Prodir
- 2008: Andalucía–Cajasur
- 2009–2010: Carmiooro A Style
- 2011–2016: Movistar Team
- 2017–2020: BMC Racing Team

Major wins
- Grand Tours Giro d'Italia 2 individual stages (2011, 2012) Vuelta a España 1 individual stage (2006) 1 TTT stage (2017) One-day races and Classics National Road Race Championships (2012) Paris–Brussels (2010)

Francisco José Ventoso Alberdi (born 6 May 1982) is a Spanish former professional road racing cyclist, who rode professionally between 2004 and 2020, for the Saunier Duval–Prodir, Andalucía–Cajasur, Carmiooro NGC, Movistar Team and CCC Team squads.

== Career ==
Ventoso turned professional with Saunier Duval–Prodir in 2004 before moving to Andalucía–Cajasur in 2008. He won the 2010 Paris–Brussels in a bunch sprint. On the back his victory in the one-day classic and 3 other stage wins, he was included in the Spanish squad to ride at the World Championships in Geelong.

== Major results ==
2004
1st Stage 1 Tour of Qatar
2005
4th Trofeo Luis Puig
2006
1st Stage 3 Vuelta a España
1st Stage 4a Euskal Bizikleta
2007
4th Gent–Wevelgem
10th Overall Vuelta a Castilla y León

1st Stages 2, 3 & 5

2008
1st Stage 3 Vuelta a Castilla y León
4th Overall Vuelta a La Rioja

1st Stage 1

2009
1st Overall Cinturó de l'Empordà

1st Stages 1 & 2

1st Overall Tour of Hainan

1st Stage 4

1st Overall Paris–Corrèze
1st Gran Premio Bruno Beghelli
1st Stage 1 Tour du Gévaudan Languedoc-Roussillon
1st Stage 2 Vuelta a la Comunidad de Madrid
2010
1st Paris–Brussels
1st Stage 5 Vuelta a Andalucía
1st Stage 2 Ster Elektrotoer
1st Stage 2 Vuelta a la Comunidad de Madrid
2011
Vuelta a Castilla y León

1st Points classification
1st Stages 1 & 2

1st Stage 6 Giro d'Italia
1st Stage 5 Tour Down Under
1st Stage 3 Vuelta a Andalucía
2nd Trofeo Palma de Mallorca
2012
1st Road race, National Road Championships
1st Stage 9 Giro d'Italia
1st Stage 4 Circuit de la Sarthe
1st Stage 5 Tour du Poitou-Charentes
2013
5th Trofeo Palma de Mallorca
5th Gran Premio Nobili Rubinetterie
6th Trofeo Campos–Santanyí–Ses Salines
6th Clásica de Almería
8th GP Ouest–France
2014
2nd Trofeo Muro-Port d'Alcúdia
3rd Gran Premio Nobili Rubinetterie
4th Clásica de Almería
8th Trofeo Ses Salines
2017
1st Stage 1 (TTT) Vuelta a España

=== Grand Tour general classification results timeline ===
Grand Tour	2005	2006	2007	2008	2009	2010	2011	2012	2013	2014	2015	2016	2017	2018	2019	2020
Giro d'Italia	DNF	—	—	—	—	—	DNF	92	66	125	—	—	94	89	87	—
Tour de France	—	78	DNF	—	—	—	139	—	—	—	—	—	—	—	—	—
/ Vuelta a España	93	78	—	—	—	—	—	—	—	—	81	—	92	111	97	DNF

Legend
—	Did not compete
DNF	Did not finish
