= Carmiooro NGC =

Cycling team

Team information
- UCI code: CMO
- Registered: Cyprus: 2008; Italy: 2009; United Kingdom:2010
- Founded: 2008
- Disbanded: 2010
- Discipline: Road
- Status: Cont: 2008–2009; ProCont: 2010

Key personnel
- Team manager: Lorenzo Di Silvestro

Team name history
- 2008 2009 2010: A Style-Somn; CarmioOro–A Style; CarmioOro–NGC

Carmiooro NGC (UCI team code: CMO) was a professional cycling team, whose license was held in Great Britain. It was founded in 2008 by Lorenzo Di Silvestro who was the Team Manager and Natale Bellotti, the team's president. The team rose to the UCI Professional Continental category in 2010, and disbanded after the season. The Directeur sportif is Jean Philippe Duracka and his assistant is Roberto Miodini

The team have in its roster Emanuele Sella who recently returned to the sport after a one-year suspension Sella has won 4 stages in the Giro d'Italia, Italy's biggest cycling event.

== Major wins ==
2008
Stage 6 Tour of Japan, Alexandre Aulas
Stage 2 Tour de Slovaquie, Fabio Terrenzio
2009
Stage 3 Étoile de Bessèges, Jure Kocjan
Overall Tour of Japan, Sergio Pardilla

Stage 5, Sergio Pardilla

Stage 6 Circuito Montañés, Sergio Pardilla
Stage 2 Vuelta a la Comunidad de Madrid, Francisco Ventoso
Stage 2 & 7 Tour of Qinghai Lake
Overall Paris–Corrèze, Francisco Ventoso
Stage 1 Tour du Gévaudan, Francisco Ventoso
Overall Cinturo de l'Emporda, Francisco Ventoso

Stage 1 & 2, Francisco Ventoso
Stage 3, Emanuele Sella

Gran Premio Bruno Beghelli, Francisco Ventoso
Overall Tour of Hainan, Francisco Ventoso

Stage 4, Francisco Ventoso

2010
Stage 1 Vuelta a Andalucía, Sergio Pardilla
Stage 5 Vuelta a Andalucía, Francisco Ventoso
Grand Prix Pino Cerami, Jure Kocjan
GP Industria & Artigianato di Larciano, Daniele Ratto
Stage 2 Ster Elektrotoer, Francisco Ventoso
Overall Vuelta a la Comunidad de Madrid, Sergio Pardilla

Stage 2, Francisco Ventoso
Stage 3, Sergio Pardilla

Overall Paris–Brussels, Francisco Ventoso

== 2010 Team ==
Rider	Date of birth
Éric Berthou (FRA)	23 January 1980 (age 46)
Laurent Beuret (SUI)	24 June 1986 (age 40)
Raffaele Ferrara (ITA)	3 October 1976 (age 49)
Sébastien Fournet-Fayard (FRA)	25 April 1985 (age 41)
Diego Genovesi (ITA)	25 April 1981 (age 45)
Paride Grillo (ITA)	23 March 1982 (age 44)
Jure Kocjan (SLO)	18 October 1984 (age 41)
Sergio Pardilla (ESP)	16 January 1984 (age 42)
Enrico Peruffo (ITA)	8 July 1985 (age 41)
Andrea Piechele (ITA)	29 June 1987 (age 39)
Antonio Quadranti (ITA)	26 August 1980 (age 46)
Alessandro Raisoni (ITA)	30 October 1983 (age 42)
Aristide Ratti (ITA)	7 June 1982 (age 44)
Daniele Ratto (ITA)	5 October 1989 (age 36)
Emanuele Sella (ITA)	9 January 1981 (age 45)
Diego Tamayo (COL)	19 September 1983 (age 42)
Fabio Terrenzio (ITA)	12 September 1985 (age 40)
Francesco Tizza (ITA)	24 February 1981 (age 45)
Andrea Tonti (ITA)	16 February 1976 (age 50)
Francisco Ventoso (ESP)	6 May 1982 (age 44)
