= José Luis Roldán =

Spanish cyclist

Personal information
- Full name: José Luis Roldán Carmona
- Born: 13 November 1985 (age 40) La Zubia, Spain

Cycling career
- Sport: Cycling
- Current team: Retired
- Discipline: Road
- Role: Rider

Professional teams
- 2009-2012: Andalucía–CajaSur
- 2015: Keith Mobel-Partizan

José Luis Roldán Carmona (born November 13, 1985, in La Zubia) is a Spanish former professional road racing cyclist. He rode in the 2011 Vuelta a España.

== Palmares ==
2008
7th Vuelta Ciclista a León
