= Matvey Mamykin =

Russian cyclist

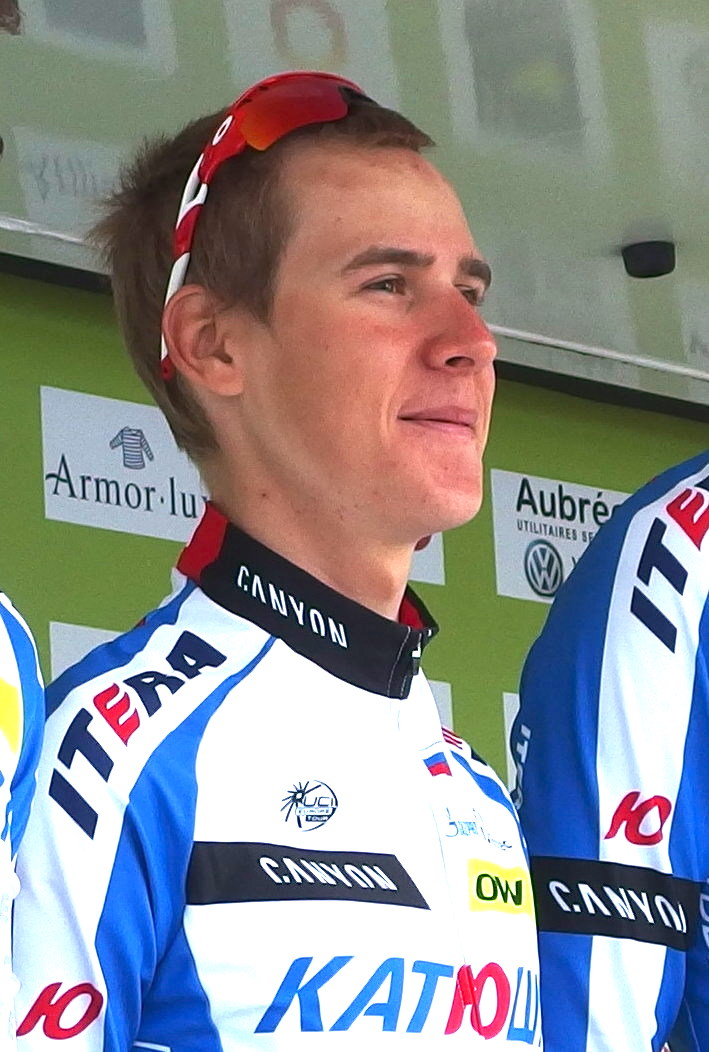
- Mamykin in 2015

Personal information
- Full name: Matvey Vyacheslavovich Mamykin
- Born: 31 October 1994 (age 31) Moscow, Russia
- Height: 1.79 m (5 ft 10 in)
- Weight: 62 kg (137 lb)

Cycling career
- Sport: Cycling
- Discipline: Road
- Role: Rider
- Rider type: Climber

Professional teams
- 2014: Team 21
- 2015: Itera–Katusha
- 2016–2017: Team Katusha
- 2018: Burgos BH
- 2019: China Continental Team of Gansu Bank
- 2020: Cambodia Cycling Academy
- 2021: Nippo–Provence–PTS Conti

Matvey Vyacheslavovich Mamykin (Russian: Матвей Вячеславович Мамыкин; born 31 October 1994) is a Russian cyclist, who most recently rode for UCI Continental team Nippo–Provence–PTS Conti. Born in Moscow, Mamykin was named in the startlist for the 2016 Vuelta a España and the start list for the 2017 Giro d'Italia.

== Major results ==
2015
1st Stage 3 Giro della Valle d'Aosta
3rd Overall Tour de l'Avenir

1st Mountains classification
1st Stage 7

5th Grand Prix of Sochi Mayor
7th Grand Prix Sarajevo
9th Overall Course de la Paix U23
10th Road race, National Under-23 Road Championships
2016
8th Overall Vuelta a Burgos

1st Young rider classification

9th Time trial, National Road Championships

=== Grand Tour general classification results timeline ===
Grand Tour	2016	2017
Giro d'Italia	—	87
Tour de France	—	—
Vuelta a España	24	DNF

Legend
—	Did not compete
DNF	Did not finish
