= Gorka Izagirre =

Spanish racing cyclist

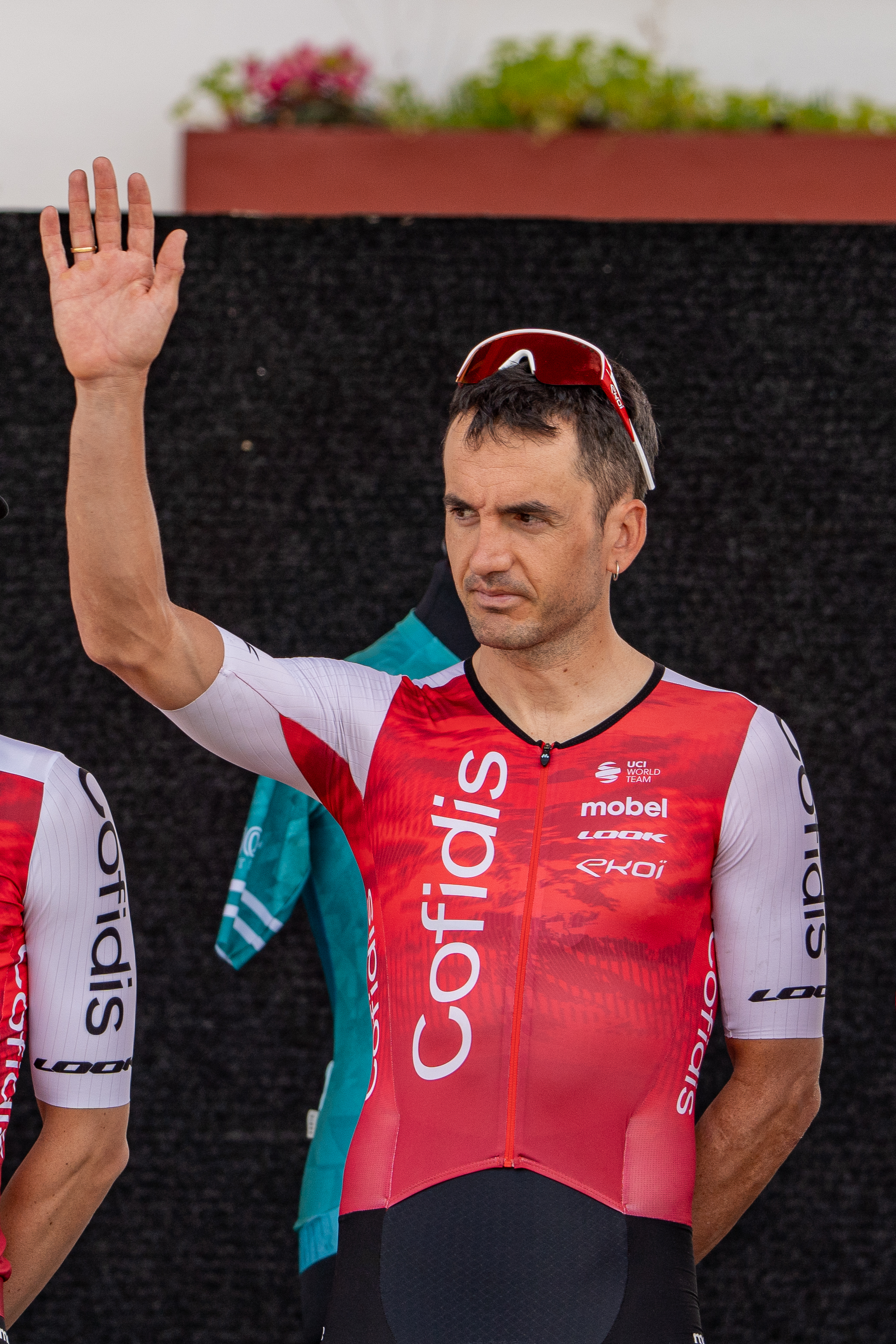
- Izagirre in Espelette, 2024 Itzulia.

Personal information
- Full name: Gorka Izagirre Insausti
- Born: 7 October 1987 (age 39) Ormaiztegi, Basque Country, Spain
- Height: 1.76 m (5 ft 9 in)
- Weight: 66 kg (146 lb)

Cycling career
- Sport: Cycling
- Current team: Retired
- Disciplines: Road; Cyclo-cross
- Role: Rider
- Rider type: Climber

Amateur team
- 2008: NGC Medical–OTC Industria Porte (stagiaire)

Professional teams
- 2009: Contentpolis–Ampo
- 2010–2013: Euskaltel–Euskadi
- 2014–2017: Movistar Team
- 2018: Bahrain–Merida
- 2019–2021: Astana
- 2022–2023: Movistar Team
- 2024: Cofidis

Major wins
- Grand Tours Giro d'Italia 1 individual stage (2017) Vuelta a España 2 TTT stages (2014, 2019) One-day races and Classics National Road Race Championships (2018) Gran Trittico Lombardo (2020)

Gorka Izagirre Insausti (born 7 October 1987) is a Spanish former cyclist, who competed as a professional from 2009 to 2024. He is the brother of fellow racing cyclist Ion Izagirre.

== Career ==
Both Izagirre brothers were signed by the Movistar Team for the 2014 season, with Ion leaving for Bahrain–Merida at the beginning of 2017.

=== Movistar Team (2014–17) ===
Izagirre won the Prueba Villafranca de Ordizia for the third time in his career in 2014. His first top 10 in a World Tour stage race came in 2015, when he placed 9th in Paris–Nice. In 2017, Izagirre finished fourth overall at Paris–Nice, and won stage 8 in the 100th edition of the Giro d'Italia.

=== Bahrain–Merida (2018) ===
Izagirre signed with the Bahrain–Merida team for the 2018 season. He started off the season with 7th overall at Tour Down Under, and then took 3rd place overall at the Tour of Oman. He was captain of the Bahrain–Merida team together with his brother Ion Izagirre at Paris–Nice. They attacked on the downhill on the last stage and the brothers looked to finish 1st and 2nd but they both crashed in a turn on the downhill section, meaning their bikes tangled together. They lost their advantage and Gorka finished 3rd overall. In late June, Izagirre finished 2nd in the Spanish National Time Trial Championships, and days later he won the Spanish National Road Race Championships. Going into the Tour de France, Izagirre was a domestique for team captain Vincenzo Nibali, however Nibali went out of the race on stage 13, meaning Izagirre had the chance to hunt stage wins. He managed to get into the breakaway on stage 16 and finished 2nd on the stage, 15 seconds down on stage winner Julian Alaphilippe.

=== Astana (2019–21) ===
In August 2018 it was announced that the Izagirre brothers would join Astana in 2019. He took two individual victories with the team – the 2019 Tour de la Provence, and the 2020 Gran Trittico Lombardo.

=== Return to Movistar Team ===
In October 2021, Izagirre signed a two-year contract to return to the Movistar Team, from the 2022 season.

== Major results ==
=== Road ===
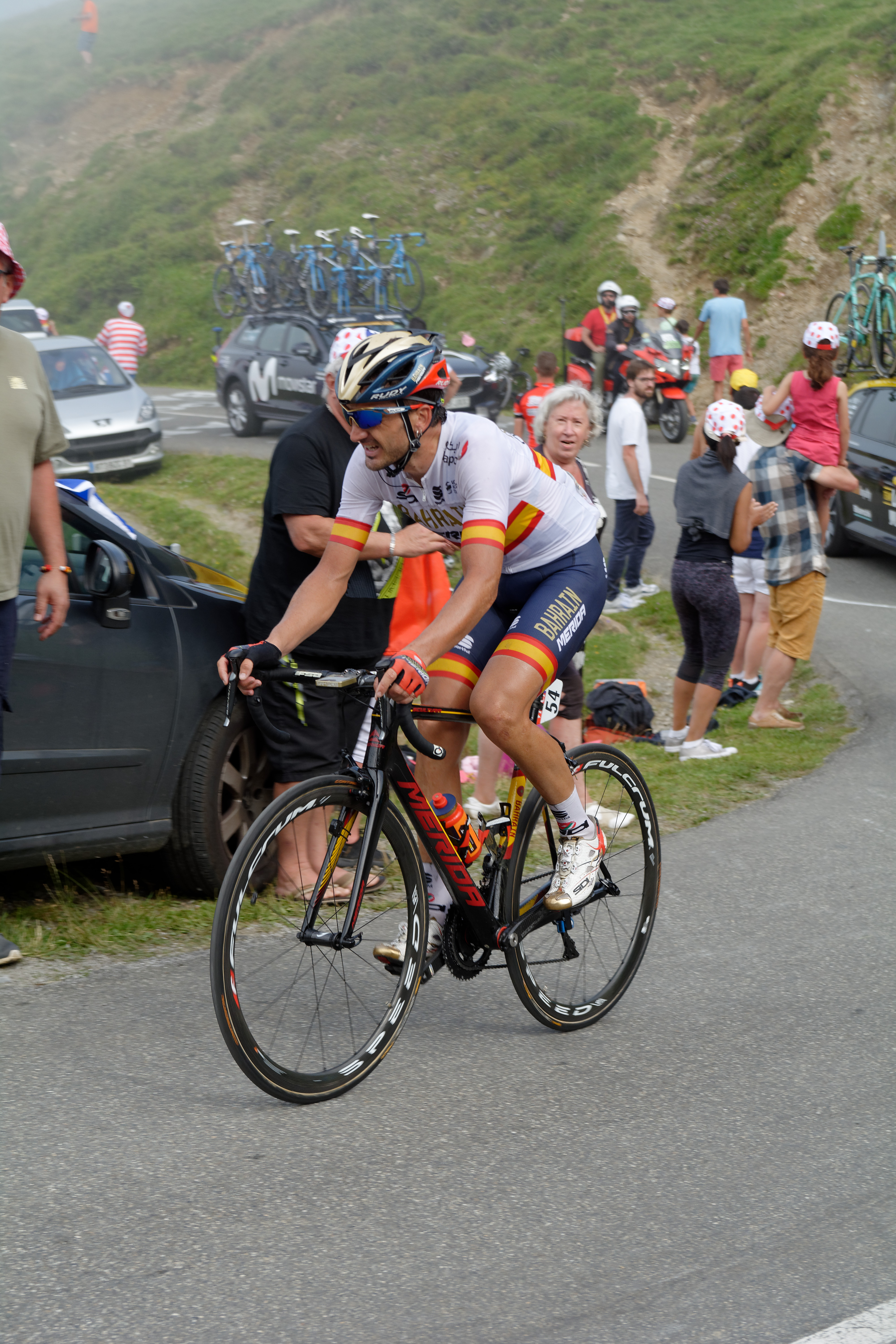
Izagirre at the 2018 Tour de France

2010 (2 pro wins)
1st Prueba Villafranca de Ordizia
1st Stage 4 Tour de Luxembourg
2011
2nd Trofeo Deia
9th Trofeo Inca
10th Overall Tour du Haut Var
2012 (1)
1st Prueba Villafranca de Ordizia
2013
7th Overall Tour Down Under
2014 (1)
1st Prueba Villafranca de Ordizia
1st Stage 1 (TTT) Vuelta a España
2nd Klasika Primavera
2015
2nd Time trial, National Road Championships
8th Overall Tour Down Under
9th Overall Paris–Nice
2016
2nd Klasika Primavera
5th Overall Dubai Tour
2017 (2)
1st Klasika Primavera
1st Stage 8 Giro d'Italia
4th Overall Paris–Nice
8th GP Miguel Induráin
2018 (1)
National Road Championships

1st Road race
2nd Time trial

3rd Overall Paris–Nice
3rd Overall Tour of Oman
7th Overall Tour Down Under
Combativity award Stage 13 Vuelta a España
2019 (1)
1st Overall Tour de la Provence
1st Stage 1 (TTT) Vuelta a España
3rd Time trial, National Road Championships
4th Clásica de San Sebastián
9th Road race, UCI Road World Championships
2020 (1)
1st Gran Trittico Lombardo
National Road Championships

2nd Road race
3rd Time trial

Combativity award Stage 6 Vuelta a España
2022
10th GP Miguel Induráin
2023
9th Overall Tour Down Under
10th Clásica Jaén Paraíso Interior
10th Vuelta a Murcia

==== General classification results timeline ====
Grand Tour general classification results
Grand Tour	2009	2010	2011	2012	2013	2014	2015	2016	2017	2018	2019	2020	2021	2022	2023
Giro d'Italia	—	—	—	—	—	83	—	—	28	—	—	—	19	—	—
Tour de France	—	—	66	39	DNF	—	32	DNF	—	24	42	22	—	DNF	37
/ Vuelta a España	—	—	—	—	—	37	—	—	—	29	53	19	27	—	
Major stage race general classification results
Race	2009	2010	2011	2012	2013	2014	2015	2016	2017	2018	2019	2020	2021	2022	2023
Paris–Nice	—	—	54	72	18	12	9	19	4	3	DNF	—	—	29	33
Tirreno–Adriatico	—	—	—	—	—	—	—	—	—	—	—	—	DNF	—	—
Volta a Catalunya	—	87	—	—	—	—	—	—	—	—	—	NH	—	—	—
Tour of the Basque Country	DNF	—	—	DNF	52	29	62	DNS	55	41	28	NH	—	30	41
Tour de Romandie	—	—	—	—	—	—	—	19	—	22	—	NH	DNF	—	—
Critérium du Dauphiné	—	—	—	—	43	—	19	—	—	—	18	31	—	64	—
Tour de Suisse	—	—	18	22	—	—	—	12	—	32	—	NH	—	—	19

Legend
—	Did not compete
DNF	Did not finish
DNS	Did not start
NH	Not held

=== Cyclo-cross ===
2007–2008
3rd National Under-23 Championships
2019–2020
1st Abadino
3rd National Championships
2021–2022
1st Abadino
