= Cinturó de l'Empordà =

Road bicycle race held in Spain

Race details
- Date: October
- Region: Province of Girona, Spain
- Discipline: Road race
- Competition: UCI Europe Tour
- Type: Stage race

History
- First edition: 2000
- Editions: 15
- Final edition: 2011
- First winner: Sergi Escobar (ESP)
- Most wins: No repeat winners
- Final winner: Paul Voss (GER)

The Cinturó de l'Empordà was a road bicycle race held annually in Spain. It was organized as a 2.2 event on the UCI Europe Tour.

== Winners ==
Year	Country	Rider	Team
2000	Spain	Sergi Escobar	
2001	Spain	Didac Cuadros	
2002	Spain	Santiago Segú	
2003	Germany	Lars Teutenberg	CC Arenal-Emaya
2004	France	Rémi Pauriol	Vélo-Club La Pomme Marseille
2005	Colombia	Giovanny Báez	Vélo-Club La Pomme Marseille
2006	Spain	Rafael Rodríguez Segarra	
2007	Latvia	Gatis Smukulis	Vélo-Club La Pomme Marseille
2008	Italy	Luca Zanasca	Centri della Calzatura–Partizan
2009	Spain	Francisco Ventoso	Carmiooro A Style
2010	Spain	José Herrada	Caja Rural
2011	Germany	Paul Voss	Endura Racing
