= 2006 Paris–Nice =

2006 UCI ProTour, race 1 of 27

Race details
- Dates: 5–12 March 2006
- Stages: 7 + Prologue
- Distance: 1,274.8 km (792.1 mi)
- Winning time: 31h 54' 41"

Results
Jersey awarded to the overall winner	Winner	Floyd Landis (USA)	(Phonak)
	Second	Patxi Vila (ESP)	(Lampre–Fondital)
	Third	Antonio Colóm (ESP)	(Caisse d'Epargne–Illes Balears)
Jersey awarded to the points classification winner	Points	Samuel Sánchez (ESP)	(Euskaltel–Euskadi)
Jersey awarded to the mountains classification winner	Mountains	David Moncoutié (FRA)	(Cofidis)
Jersey awarded to the youth classification winner	Youth	Luis León Sánchez (ESP)	(Liberty Seguros–Würth)
	Team	(Italy) Lampre–Fondital	

The 2006 Paris–Nice was the 64th edition of the Paris–Nice cycle race and was held from 5 March to 12 March 2006. The race started in Chaville and finished in Nice. The race was won by Floyd Landis of Team Phonak.

== Teams ==
Twenty-one teams, containing a total of 168 riders, participated in the race:

- Team CSC
- Phonak
- Rabobank
- Davitamon–Lotto
- Liberty Seguros–Würth
- Gerolsteiner
- Saunier Duval–Prodir
- Discovery Channel
- Crédit Agricole
- Caisse d'Epargne–Illes Balears
- Cofidis
- Quick-Step–Innergetic
- T-Mobile Team
- Liquigas
- Lampre–Fondital
- Bouygues Télécom
- Team Milram
- Euskaltel–Euskadi
- Française des Jeux
- AG2R Prévoyance
- Agritubel

== Route ==
Stage characteristics and winners
Stage	Date	Course	Distance	Type	Winner
P	5 March	Issy-les-Moulineaux	4.8 km (3.0 mi)	Individual time trial	Bobby Julich (USA)
1	6 March	Villemandeur to Saint-Amand-Montrond	193 km (120 mi)	Flat stage	Tom Boonen (BEL)
2	7 March	Cérilly to Belleville	200 km (120 mi)	Hilly stage	Tom Boonen (BEL)
3	8 March	Juliénas to Saint-Étienne	168.5 km (104.7 mi)	Medium mountain stage	Patxi Vila (ESP)
4	9 March	Saint-Étienne to Rasteau	193 km (120 mi)	Medium mountain stage	Tom Boonen (BEL)
5	10 March	Avignon to Digne-les-Bains	201.5 km (125.2 mi)	Mountain stage	Joaquim Rodríguez (ESP)
6	11 March	Digne-les-Bains to Cannes	179 km (111 mi)	Medium mountain stage	Andrey Kashechkin (KAZ)
7	12 March	Nice to Nice	135 km (84 mi)	Mountain stage	Markus Zberg (SUI)

== Stages ==
=== Prologue ===
5 March 2006 — Issy-les-Moulineaux to Issy-les-Moulineaux, 4.8 km (3.0 mi) (ITT)

The prologue stage saw 2005 GC winner Bobby Julich retain the yellow/white GC leader's jersey after defeating Kazakh Andrey Kaschechkin, who held the best time through most of the stage's duration, by a narrow margin of 1 second. As the winner of the first stage he also received the green/white points jersey. The blue jersey for best young rider went to Alberto Contador.

	Cyclist	Team	Time
1	Bobby Julich (USA)	Team CSC	6' 07"
2	Andrey Kaschechkin (KAZ)	Liberty Seguros–Würth	+ 1"
3	Bradley McGee (AUS)	Française des Jeux	+ 2"

=== Stage 1 ===
6 March 2006 — Villemandeur to Saint-Amand-Montrond, 193 km (120 mi)

By winning the peloton sprint in Saint-Amand-Montrond ahead of Allan Davis, Tom Boonen (who finished fifth in the prologue stage five seconds down on Bobby Julich) took over the yellow/white jersey due to the time bonus awarded to stage winners. He also took over first place in the points classification.

After a short solo breakaway effort by David Zabriskie, Frenchmen Cristophe Laurent and Stéphane Augé launched a long attack at the 60-km point but were caught by the chasing peloton only 2 km before the finish line. Augé was awarded the first red polka dotted jersey in the mountains classification.

	Cyclist	Team	Time
1	Tom Boonen (BEL)	Quick-Step–Innergetic	4h 56' 01"
2	Allan Davis (AUS)	Liberty Seguros–Würth	s.t.
3	Francisco Ventoso (ESP)	Saunier Duval–Prodir	s.t.

=== Stage 2 ===
7 March 2006 — Cérilly to Belleville, 200 km (120 mi)

Stage 2 saw a repeat of Tom Boonen's victory over Allan Davis in the first stage, the Belgian finishing first in another bunch sprint.

The polka-dotted mountains jersey changed hands due to a long breakaway by French rider Nicolas Crosbie, who established a maximum lead of 27'30" after 81 kilometers. Crosbie was caught by the peloton 10 km before the finish line.

The blue jersey for the best young rider was awarded to Benoît Vaugrenard who took over first place with former leader Alberto Contador finishing 1'13 behind the pack.

	Cyclist	Team	Time
1	Tom Boonen (BEL)	Quick-Step–Innergetic	5h 20' 50"
2	Allan Davis (AUS)	Liberty Seguros–Würth	s.t.
3	Danilo Napolitano (ITA)	Lampre–Fondital	s.t.

=== Stage 3 ===
8 March 2006 — Juliénas to Saint-Étienne, 168.5 km (104.7 mi)

In the third stage to Saint-Étienne, where Kazakh racer Andrei Kivilev died after a fall in the 2003 edition of Paris–Nice (prompting the UCI to make the wearing of helmets mandatory during all UCI-sanctioned races), there were some changes to the race classifications as American Floyd Landis took over first place in the GC, placing second in the stage after Patxi Xabier Vila Errandonea.

Nicolas Crosbie and Tom Boonen retained their respective climber and sprinter jerseys, whereas the blue jersey for the best young rider was awarded to Stefan Schumacher who finished 1'25 behind the winner.

As expected of a hilly stage Stage 3 saw breakaway attempts on the different climbs, the defining break happening on the last climb of the day, the Col de la Croix de Chaubouret.

	Cyclist	Team	Time
1	Patxi Vila (ESP)	Lampre–Fondital	4h 23'28"
2	Floyd Landis (USA)	Phonak	s.t.
3	Samuel Sánchez (ESP)	Euskaltel–Euskadi	+ 1' 16"

=== Stage 4 ===
9 March 2006 — Saint-Étienne to Rasteau, 193 km (120 mi)

	Cyclist	Team	Time
1	Tom Boonen (BEL)	Quick-Step–Innergetic	4h 40' 29"
2	Allan Davis (AUS)	Liberty Seguros–Würth	s.t.
3	Stefan Schumacher (GER)	Gerolsteiner	s.t.

=== Stage 5 ===
10 March 2006 — Avignon to Digne-les-Bains, 201.5 km (125.2 mi)

	Cyclist	Team	Time
1	Joaquim Rodríguez (ESP)	Caisse d'Epargne–Illes Balears	4h 43' 34"
2	Joost Posthuma (NED)	Rabobank	+ 19"
3	Jérôme Pineau (FRA)	Bouygues Télécom	+ 33"

=== Stage 6 ===
11 March 2006 — Digne-les-Bains to Cannes, 179 km (111 mi)

	Cyclist	Team	Time
1	Andrey Kaschechkin (KAZ)	Liberty Seguros–Würth	4h 12' 08"
2	Sylvain Chavanel (FRA)	Cofidis	+ 1' 06"
3	Sandy Casar (FRA)	Française des Jeux	+ 1' 11"

=== Stage 7 ===
12 March 2006 — Nice to Nice, 135 km (84 mi)

	Cyclist	Team	Time
1	Markus Zberg (SUI)	Gerolsteiner	3h 29' 38"
2	Evgeni Petrov (RUS)	Lampre–Fondital	s.t.
3	Alberto Contador (ESP)	Liberty Seguros–Würth	s.t.

== General Standings ==
	Cyclist	Team	Time
1	Floyd Landis (USA)	Phonak	31h 54' 41"
2	Patxi Vila (ESP)	Lampre–Fondital	+ 9"
3	Antonio Colóm (ESP)	Liberty Seguros–Würth	+ 1' 05"

== Mountains Classification ==
	Cyclist	Team	Points
1	David Moncoutié (FRA)	Cofidis	51
2	Christophe Laurent (FRA)	Agritubel	42
3	Joaquim Rodríguez (ESP)	Caisse d'Epargne–Illes Balears	39

== Points Classification ==
	Cyclist	Team	Points
1	Samuel Sánchez (ESP)	Euskaltel–Euskadi	66
2	Sandy Casar (FRA)	Française des Jeux	63
3	Jérôme Pineau (FRA)	Bouygues Télécom	52

== Best Young Rider ==
	Cyclist	Team	Time
1	Luis León Sánchez (ESP)	Liberty Seguros–Würth	31h 58' 11"
2	Joost Posthuma (NED)	Rabobank	+ 21"
3	Thomas Löfkvist (SWE)	Française des Jeux	+ 52"

== Best Team ==
	Team	Country	Total time
1	Lampre–Fondital	Italy	95h 51' 43"
2	Discovery Channel	United States	+ 3"
3	Liberty Seguros–Würth	Spain	+ 34"
