= 2015 Paris–Nice =

Cycling race

2015 UCI World Tour, race 2 of 28
- Route of the 2015 Paris–Nice

Race details
- Dates: 8–15 March 2015
- Stages: 8
- Distance: 1,141 km (709 mi)
- Winning time: 29h 10' 41"

Results
Jersey awarded to the overall winner	Winner	Richie Porte (AUS)	(Team Sky)
	Second	Michał Kwiatkowski (POL)	(Etixx–Quick-Step)
	Third	Simon Špilak (SLO)	(Team Katusha)
Jersey awarded to the points classification winner	Points	Michael Matthews (AUS)	(Orica–GreenEDGE)
Jersey awarded to the mountains classification winner	Mountains	Thomas De Gendt (BEL)	(Lotto–Soudal)
Jersey awarded to the young rider classification winner	Young rider	Michał Kwiatkowski (POL)	(Etixx–Quick-Step)
	Team	Team Sky	

The 2015 Paris–Nice was the 73rd edition of the Paris–Nice stage race. It took place from 8 to 15 March and was the second race of the 2015 UCI World Tour following the Tour Down Under. The race was a return to the traditional format of Paris−Nice after an unorthodox course in 2014. It started in Yvelines, west of Paris, with a prologue time trial; the course then moved south through France with several stages suitable for sprinters. The decisive part of the race began on stage four with a summit finish at the Col de la Croix de Chaubouret; stage six also had a mountainous route. The race ended after seven days with the climb of the Col d'Èze outside Nice.

The 2014 champion, Carlos Betancur (AG2R La Mondiale), chose not to defend his title. The early lead in the race was taken by Michał Kwiatkowski (Etixx–Quick-Step) in the prologue; he kept the lead until stage three, when Michael Matthews took over the race lead through time bonuses. Stage four was won by Richie Porte (Team Sky), while Kwiatkowski took back the race lead. On stage six, a chaotic stage in rainy conditions, Tony Gallopin (Lotto–Soudal) won and took over the race lead, but he was unable to defend his lead in the final-day time trial. Porte, the 2013 champion, won the general classification as well as two stages. Kwiatkowski finished second overall, with Simon Špilak (Team Katusha) on the same time in third place.

The points classification was won by Matthews, who had four top-ten finishes as well as his stage win. The mountains classification was won by Thomas De Gendt (Lotto–Soudal). Kwiatkowski won the young riders classification as the best rider born after 1 January 1990. The teams classification was won by Team Sky.

== Teams ==
As Paris–Nice was a UCI World Tour event, all 17 UCI WorldTeams were invited automatically and were obliged to send a squad. Three Professional Continental teams received wildcard invitations.

UCI WorldTeams

- AG2R La Mondiale
- Astana
- BMC Racing Team
- Etixx–Quick-Step
- FDJ
- IAM Cycling
- Lampre–Merida
- Lotto–Soudal
- Movistar Team
- Orica–GreenEDGE
- Cannondale–Garmin
- Team Giant–Alpecin
- Team Katusha
- LottoNL–Jumbo
- Team Sky
- Tinkoff–Saxo
- Trek Factory Racing

UCI Professional Continental teams

- Bretagne–Séché Environnement
- Cofidis
- Team Europcar

== Pre-race favourites ==
Paris–Nice overlapped with another UCI World Tour race, Tirreno–Adriatico. In 2015, the Italian race attracted the main Grand Tour riders, such as Alberto Contador (Tinkoff–Saxo), Chris Froome (Team Sky), Vincenzo Nibali (Astana) and Nairo Quintana (Movistar Team). Only one former Grand Tour champion, Bradley Wiggins (Team Sky), chose to compete in Paris–Nice.

The favourites for the race included the 2013 champion, Richie Porte (Team Sky), the 2011 champion, Tony Martin (Etixx–Quick-Step) and the 2014 world champion, Michał Kwiatkowski (Etixx–Quick-Step). Other riders considered to have a chance of victory included Geraint Thomas (Team Sky), who had just won the Volta ao Algarve, Romain Bardet and Jean-Christophe Péraud (both AG2R La Mondiale), Tejay van Garderen (BMC Racing Team), Andrew Talansky (Cannondale–Garmin) and Rui Costa (Lampre–Merida).

Paris–Nice was also raced by many classics riders preparing for the Spring Classics and especially Milan–San Remo, which followed just a few days later. Riders expected to feature on the flatter days included classics specialists such as Alexander Kristoff (Team Katusha), John Degenkolb (Team Giant–Alpecin), Arnaud Démare (FDJ) and Philippe Gilbert (BMC Racing Team) and sprinters like Nacer Bouhanni (Cofidis) and André Greipel (Lotto–Soudal).

== Route ==
The previous edition had been an unusual race with no time trials or summit finishes, but the 2015 edition of the race was a return to the traditional form: the race began with a prologue individual time trial near Paris; this was followed by a series of road stages south through France, including one summit finish; the race ended with a mountain time trial on the Col d'Èze. The race, known as the "race to the Sun", was seen as a mini-Tour de France, where riders needed to be both competent time-trialists and capable of climbing mountains. The key stages were expected to be the summit finish on the Col de la Croix de Chaubouret on stage 4 and the concluding time trial on the Col d'Èze.

Stage characteristics and winners
Stage	Date	Course	Distance	Type	Winner
P	8 March	Maurepas	6.7 km (4 mi)	Individual time trial	Michał Kwiatkowski (POL)
1	9 March	Saint-Rémy-lès-Chevreuse to Contres	192 km (119 mi)	Flat stage	Alexander Kristoff (NOR)
2	10 March	ZooParc de Beauval to Saint-Amand-Montrond	172 km (107 mi)	Flat stage	André Greipel (GER)
3	11 March	Saint-Amand-Montrond to Saint-Pourçain-sur-Sioule	179 km (111 mi)	Flat stage	Michael Matthews (AUS)
4	12 March	Varennes-sur-Allier to Croix de Chaubouret	204 km (127 mi)	Mountain stage	Richie Porte (AUS)
5	13 March	Saint-Étienne to Rasteau	192 km (119 mi)	Hilly stage	Davide Cimolai (ITA)
6	14 March	Vence to Nice	181.5 km (113 mi)	Mountain stage	Tony Gallopin (FRA)
7	15 March	Nice to Col d'Èze	9.6 km (6 mi)	Individual time trial	Richie Porte (AUS)

== Stages ==
=== Prologue ===
8 March 2015 — Maurepas to Maurepas, 6.7 km (4.2 mi), individual time trial (ITT)

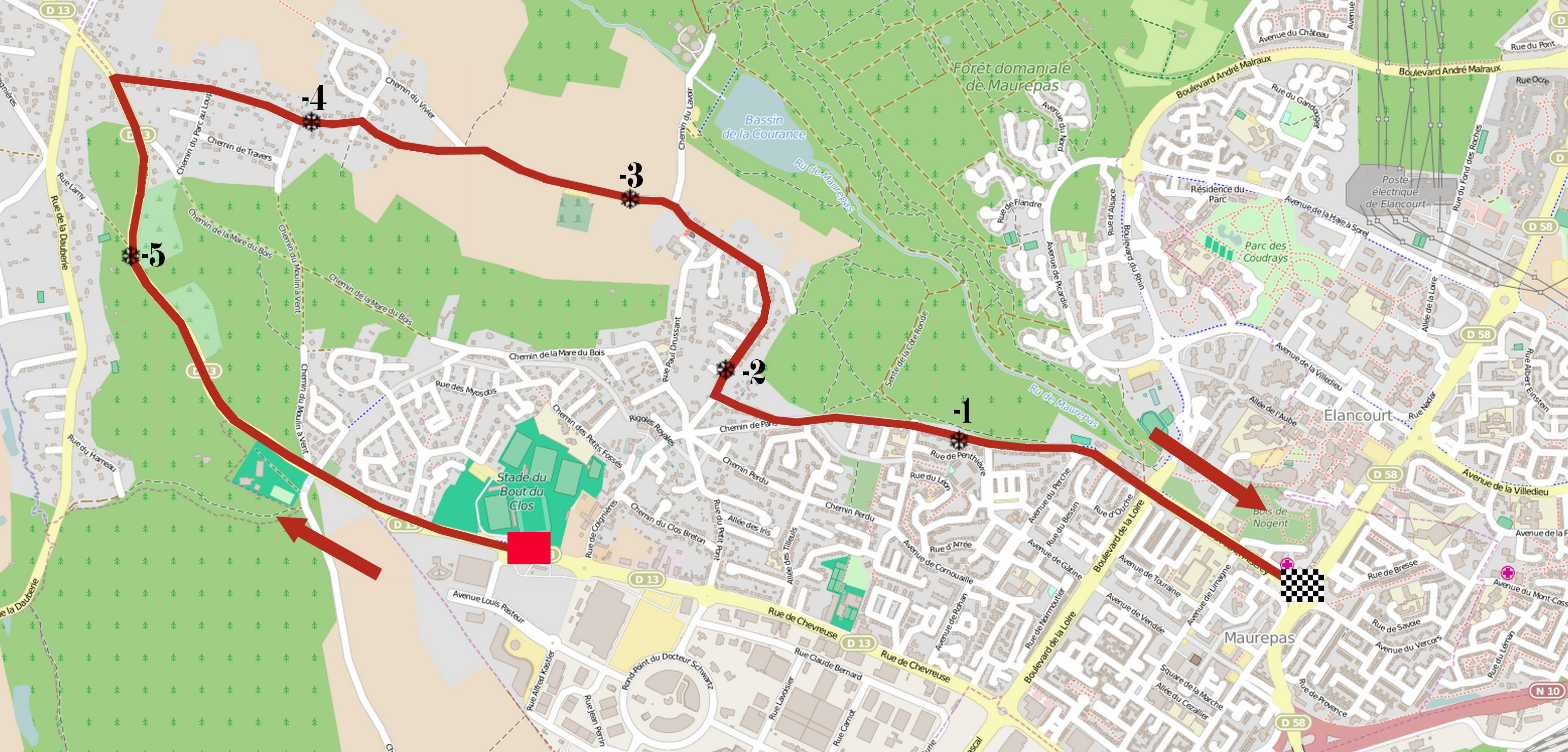
Route of the prologue

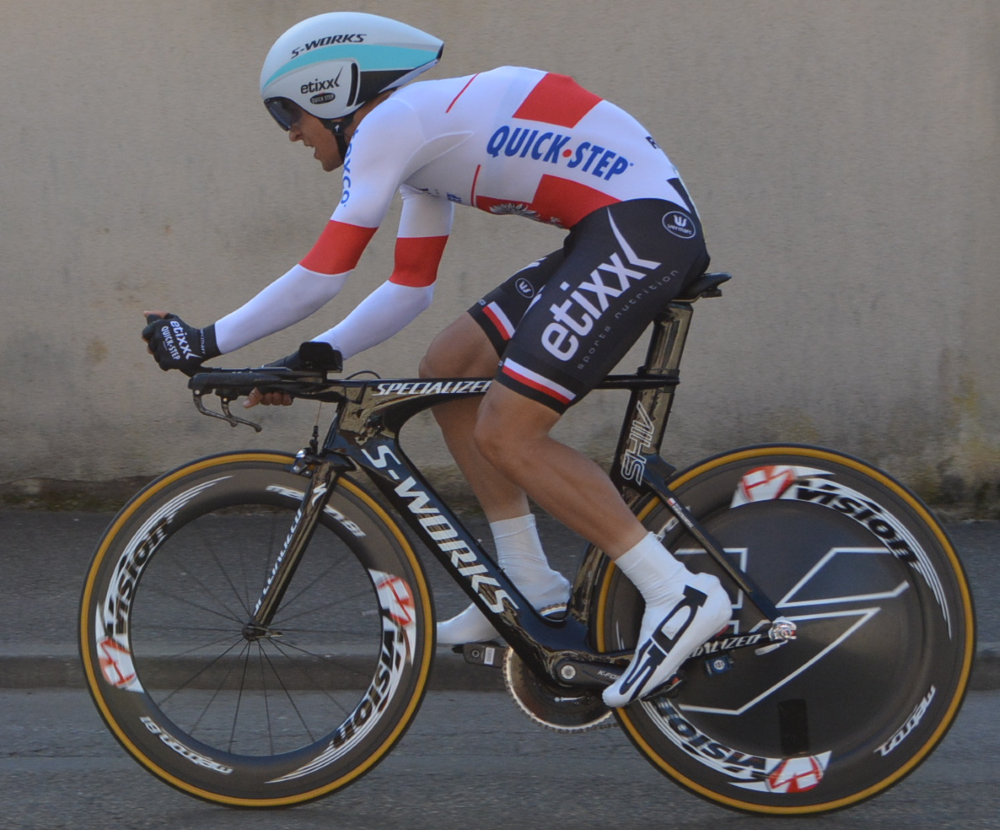
Michał Kwiatkowski riding in the prologue, wearing the jersey of the national time trial champion of Poland.

The race began with a prologue individual time trial in the Yvelines department. The 6.7-kilometre (4.2-mile) prologue was flat, with three major turns. The riders included four of the top five of previous year's world time trial championships in Bradley Wiggins (Team Sky), Tony Martin (Etixx–Quick-Step), Tom Dumoulin (Team Giant–Alpecin) and Rohan Dennis (BMC Racing Team).

The first rider to set off in the race was Daniel McLay (Bretagne–Séché Environnement). Dylan van Baarle (Cannondale–Garmin) was the leader for a significant period, with a time of 8' 04". The lead was briefly held by Giacomo Nizzolo (Trek Factory Racing) and Tiago Machado (Team Katusha). Their times were beaten by Dennis, who recorded a time of 7' 40". Dennis held the lead for an hour and a half, until he was beaten by Michał Kwiatkowski by less than a second. Kwiatkowski's time was enough to beat all the other riders. He therefore took the yellow jersey of the overall leader, as well as the green jersey of the points leader and the white jersey of the best young rider. The absence of categorised climbs meant that no polka-dot jersey was awarded.

Prologue result and General classification after Prologue
Rank	Rider	Team	Time
1	Michał Kwiatkowski (POL)	Etixx–Quick-Step	7' 40"
2	Rohan Dennis (AUS)	BMC Racing Team	+ 0"
3	Tony Martin (GER)	Etixx–Quick-Step	+ 7"
4	Luis León Sánchez (ESP)	Astana	+ 10"
5	Lars Boom (NED)	Astana	+ 10"
6	John Degenkolb (GER)	Team Giant–Alpecin	+ 10"
7	Sylvain Chavanel (FRA)	IAM Cycling	+ 10"
8	Michael Matthews (AUS)	Orica–GreenEDGE	+ 12"
9	Tom Dumoulin (NED)	Team Giant–Alpecin	+ 13"
10	Geraint Thomas (GBR)	Team Sky	+ 14"

=== Stage 1 ===
9 March 2015 — Saint-Rémy-lès-Chevreuse to Contres, 192 km (119.3 mi)

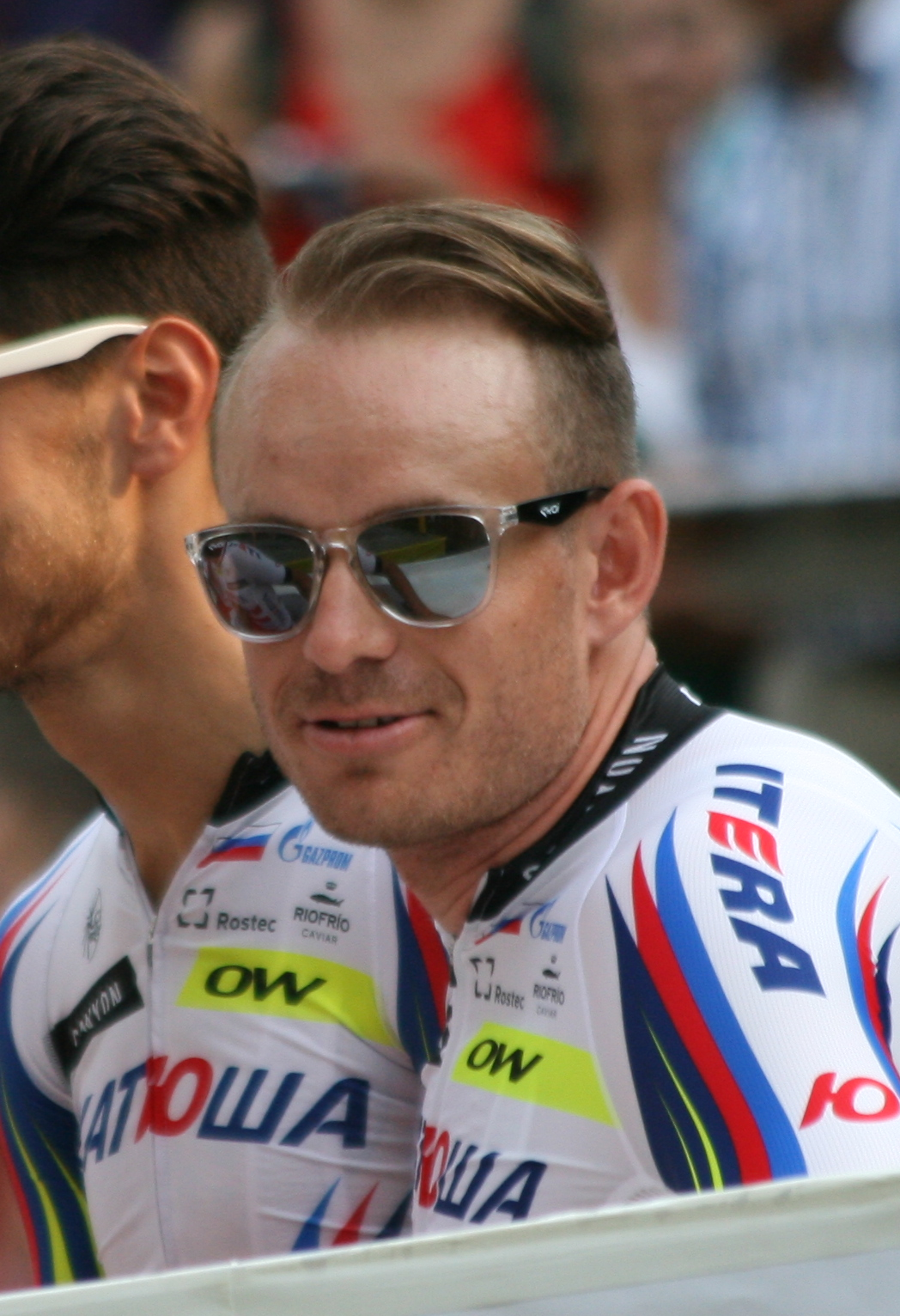
Alexander Kristoff, photographed at the 2015 Tour de France, winner of stage 1

The first road stage of the race took the riders over an almost entirely flat 192-kilometre (119.3-mile) course south from Saint-Rémy-lès-Chevreuse to Contres. There was one climb in the day's racing – the Côte de Bel Air – after 3 kilometres (1.9 miles).

The first breakaway of the day came from Jonathan Hivert (Bretagne–Séché Environnement). He attacked alone and took both maximum mountain points and the victory at the first intermediate sprint. Despite at one point having a lead of nearly four minutes, he sat up and was caught by the peloton. Michael Matthews (Orica–GreenEDGE), in eighth place after the prologue, took second place in the intermediate sprint to win two bonus seconds, moving him to ten seconds behind Michał Kwiatkowski, while John Degenkolb (Team Giant–Alpecin) took a second for finishing third.

The next significant move was made by Hivert's teammate, Anthony Delaplace, who broke away with Thomas Voeckler (Team Europcar). The two remained in the breakaway for most of the rest of the stage, which was raced at a very slow pace. Delaplace and Voeckler had a lead of over six minutes, but the peloton gradually chased them down. With 25 kilometres (16 miles) remaining, they had about a minute's lead and Voeckler forced an acceleration. Their lead extended to over 1' 40" with 15 kilometres (9 miles) remaining, and they won the final intermediate sprint. Geraint Thomas (Team Sky) took the bonus second for third place. The breakaway still had over 40 seconds' lead with 5 kilometres (3 miles) remaining, but were caught by the sprinters' teams 1.5 kilometres (0.9 miles) from the finish line.

Degenkolb was the first rider to start the sprint in a disorganised finale to the stage, but he was not able to maintain his speed and finished outside the top ten. The stage was won by Alexander Kristoff (Team Katusha) ahead of Nacer Bouhanni (Cofidis) and Bryan Coquard (Team Europcar). Kwiatkowski therefore maintained his lead in the general, points and youth classifications, while Hivert took the polka dot jersey of the mountains classification.

18 kilometres (11 miles) from the end of the stage, Tom Boonen clashed wheels while riding at the back of the peloton. He fell on his shoulder and, after receiving medical attention, abandoned the race with a suspected broken collarbone. That evening, it was announced that, though his collarbone was not broken, he had suffered a dislocation in his shoulder and would miss the Spring Classics season, including his principal targets at Paris–Roubaix and the Tour of Flanders.

Stage 1 result
Rank	Rider	Team	Time
1	Alexander Kristoff (NOR)	Team Katusha	5h 15' 18"
2	Nacer Bouhanni (FRA)	Cofidis	+ 0"
3	Bryan Coquard (FRA)	Team Europcar	+ 0"
4	Heinrich Haussler (AUS)	IAM Cycling	+ 0"
5	Giacomo Nizzolo (ITA)	Trek Factory Racing	+ 0"
6	José Joaquín Rojas (ESP)	Movistar Team	+ 0"
7	Moreno Hofland (NED)	LottoNL–Jumbo	+ 0"
8	Niccolò Bonifazio (ITA)	Lampre–Merida	+ 0"
9	Ben Swift (GBR)	Team Sky	+ 0"
10	Michael Matthews (AUS)	Orica–GreenEDGE	+ 0"

General classification after stage 1
Rank	Rider	Team	Time
1	Michał Kwiatkowski (POL)	Etixx–Quick-Step	5h 22' 58"
2	Rohan Dennis (AUS)	BMC Racing Team	+ 0"
3	Tony Martin (GER)	Etixx–Quick-Step	+ 7"
4	John Degenkolb (GER)	Team Giant–Alpecin	+ 9"
5	Luis León Sánchez (ESP)	Astana	+ 10"
6	Lars Boom (NED)	Astana	+ 10"
7	Michael Matthews (AUS)	Orica–GreenEDGE	+ 10"
8	Sylvain Chavanel (FRA)	IAM Cycling	+ 10"
9	Tom Dumoulin (NED)	Team Giant–Alpecin	+ 13"
10	Geraint Thomas (GBR)	Team Sky	+ 13"

=== Stage 2 ===
10 March 2015 — ZooParc de Beauval (Saint-Aignan) to Saint-Amand-Montrond, 172 km (106.9 mi)

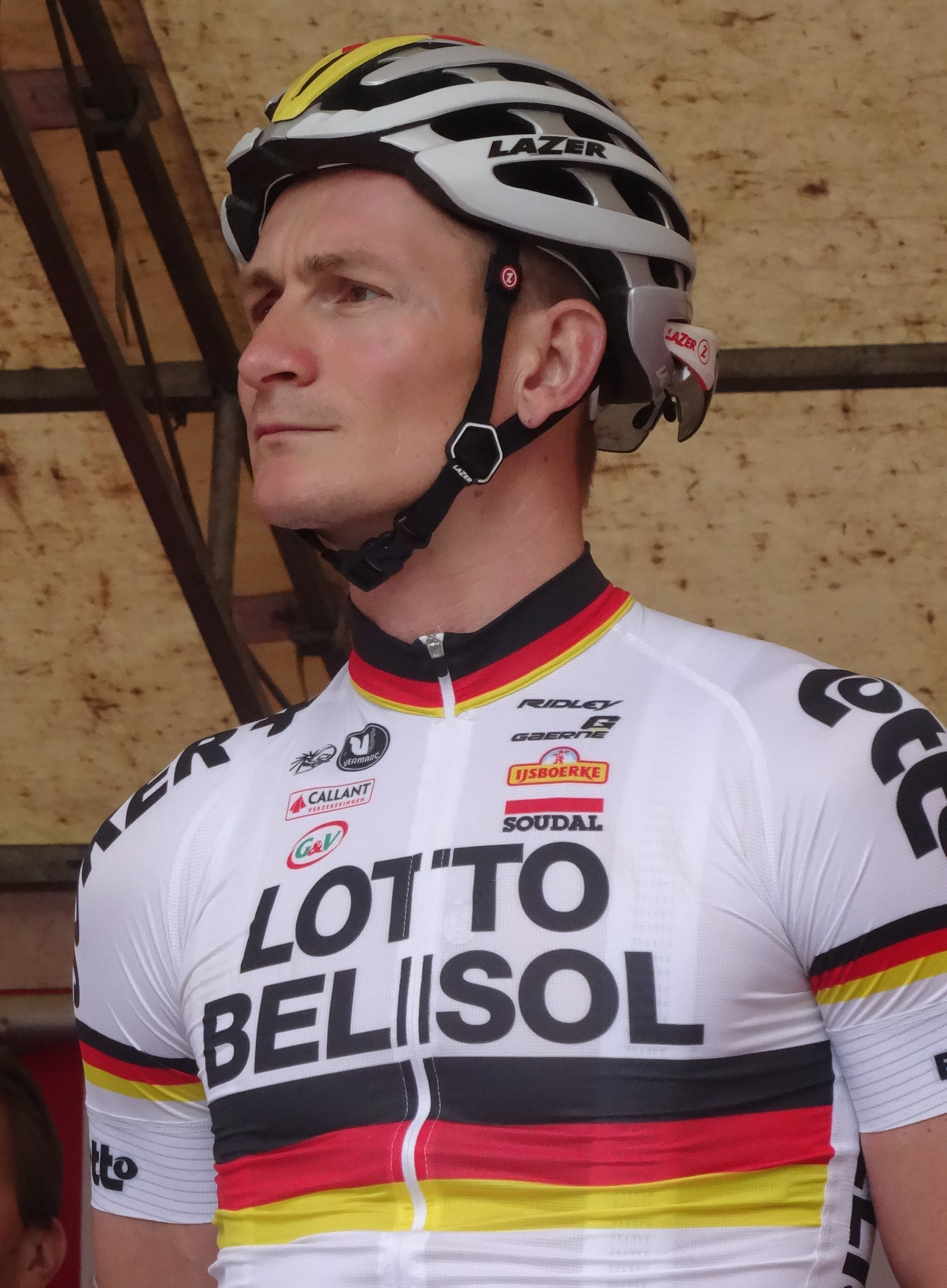
André Greipel, photographed in 2014, winner of stage two

The second road stage was a 172-kilometre (106.9-mile) route from the ZooParc de Beauval to the town of Saint-Amand-Montrond. The first part of the route was a 127-kilometre (79-mile) route southeast. The riders then entered a finishing circuit; they first rode the final 8 kilometres (5 miles) of the circuit, before doing a complete 45-kilometre (28-mile) lap. The route was again mostly flat, with just one categorised climb. This was the Côte de la Tour and came as part of the finishing circuit.

The first breakaway of the day was formed by Arnaud Gérard (Bretagne–Séché Environnement), who escaped alone and earned a lead of over eight minutes, with the peloton riding slowly behind. Gerard won both intermediate sprints. On the first, Alexander Kristoff (Team Katusha) took second place to win two bonus seconds. John Degenkolb(Team Giant–Alpecin), who had come third and won a one-second bonus in the first sprint, took second place in the second sprint ahead of Michael Matthews (Orica–GreenEDGE).

The chase was led by Cofidis and Team Europcar and Gerard had less than a minute's lead at the Côte de la Tour. Philippe Gilbert (BMC Racing Team), Jonathan Hivert (Bretagne–Séché Environnement) and Laurens De Vreese (Astana) attacked over the climb, with Hivert winning a point for the mountains classification and maintaining his lead in the competition. The race came back together with approximately 38 kilometres (24 miles) left to race.

The following period of racing was relatively calm, without attacks and with Cannondale–Garmin controlling the pace. With 9.2 kilometres (5.7 miles) remaining, however, Tony Martin (Etixx–Quick-Step) attacked and was joined by Geraint Thomas (Team Sky), Lars Boom (Astana) and Matti Breschel (Tinkoff–Saxo). Breschel suffered a puncture and dropped out of the move, but Martin, Thomas and Boom continued their breakaway attempt. Several riders, including Rui Costa (Lampre–Merida), made unsuccessful attempts to bridge across to the leading group. The chase in the main peloton was led by Lotto–Soudal and the leading group was caught with 1.5 kilometres (0.9 miles) remaining.

The first team to move forward in the sprint was Orica–GreenEDGE, with IAM Cycling following soon afterwards. Greg Henderson, however, was the penultimate man in the Lotto–Soudal train; his lead-out brought André Greipel to a perfect position to open his sprint. Arnaud Démare (FDJ) came close, but Greipel was able to win the stage. Degenkolb took third place and, with bonus seconds taken into account, was just two seconds behind Michał Kwiatkowski.

Stage 2 result
Rank	Rider	Team	Time
1	André Greipel (GER)	Lotto–Soudal	4h 30' 18"
2	Arnaud Démare (FRA)	FDJ	+ 0"
3	John Degenkolb (GER)	Team Giant–Alpecin	+ 0"
4	Michael Matthews (AUS)	Orica–GreenEDGE	+ 0"
5	José Joaquín Rojas (ESP)	Movistar Team	+ 0"
6	Nacer Bouhanni (FRA)	Cofidis	+ 0"
7	Moreno Hofland (NED)	LottoNL–Jumbo	+ 0"
8	Alexander Kristoff (NOR)	Team Katusha	+ 0"
9	Jonas van Genechten (BEL)	IAM Cycling	+ 0"
10	Niccolò Bonifazio (ITA)	Lampre–Merida	+ 0"

General classification after stage 2
Rank	Rider	Team	Time
1	Michał Kwiatkowski (POL)	Etixx–Quick-Step	9h 53' 16"
2	Rohan Dennis (AUS)	BMC Racing Team	+ 0"
3	John Degenkolb (GER)	Team Giant–Alpecin	+ 2"
4	Tony Martin (GER)	Etixx–Quick-Step	+ 7"
5	Michael Matthews (AUS)	Orica–GreenEDGE	+ 9"
6	Luis León Sánchez (ESP)	Astana	+ 10"
7	Lars Boom (NED)	Astana	+ 10"
8	Sylvain Chavanel (FRA)	IAM Cycling	+ 10"
9	Tom Dumoulin (NED)	Team Giant–Alpecin	+ 13"
10	Geraint Thomas (GBR)	Team Sky	+ 13"

=== Stage 3 ===
11 March 2015 — Saint-Amand-Montrond to Saint-Pourçain-sur-Sioule, 179 km (111 mi)

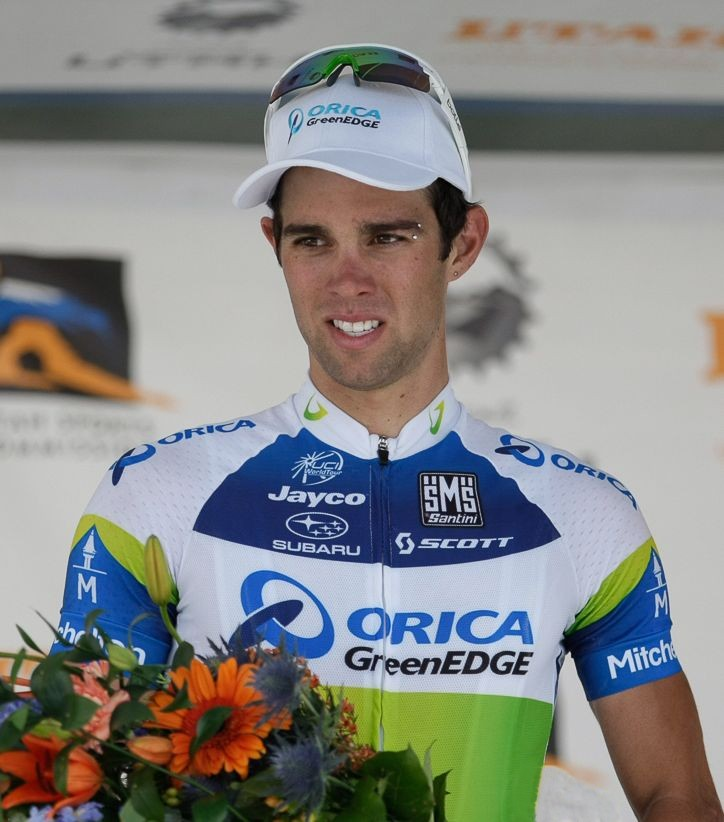
Michael Matthews, photographed in 2013, winner of stage three

The third stage started where stage two had ended, Saint-Amand-Montrond, and took the riders over a 179-kilometre (111-mile) route to the finish line in Saint-Pourçain-sur-Sioule. The route started with a 146.5-kilometre (91.0-mile) route, initially heading south-east before turning north in the final part of the stage. The riders then entered another finishing circuit. They first rode the final 13 kilometres (8 miles) of the circuit, then did an entire 19.5-kilometre (12.1-mile) lap. There was a short climb and two corners in the final kilometre of the stage.

The first break of the day was formed by Philippe Gilbert (BMC Racing Team) and Florian Vachon (Bretagne–Séché Environnement) after 9 kilometres (6 miles). Bradley Wiggins (Team Sky) and Antoine Duchesne (Team Europcar) attempted to bridge across to the leading pair; Wiggins was first to drop back, while Duchesne was never able to get closer than two minutes to the pair ahead. Bob Jungels (Trek Factory Racing) took third place in the first intermediate sprint. At the first mountains sprint, Gilbert crossed the line first to win four points and take the lead of the mountains classification. Following repeated attacks from the peloton behind, Gilbert and Vachon were joined after 74 kilometres (46 miles) by Thomas Voeckler (Team Europcar). Gilbert then won the two other third-category climbs, earning a nine-point lead in the classification.

With 50 kilometres (31 miles) remaining, Gilbert, Vachon and Voeckler still had a five-minute lead, with the sprinters' teams joining Michał Kwiatkowski's Etixx–Quick-Step team in chasing the breakaway down. With 20 kilometres (12 miles) left to race, the lead was cut to 43 seconds, and Gilbert dropped out of the break with 17 kilometres (11 miles) remaining. Vachon was next to drop out of the leading group; Voeckler was then joined by Paolo Tiralongo (Astana). Voeckler himself then fell back, while Tiralongo was joined by AG2R La Mondiale riders Jan Bakelants and Romain Bardet. This group of three riders held a gap of approximately 16 seconds, but were chased down by the peloton.

The sprint was led by Orica–GreenEDGE in support of Michael Matthews, for whom the short hill before the finish line was ideal. Lampre–Merida tried and failed to come past them in the final kilometre. With 500 m (1,640 ft) to go, Orica–GreenEDGE still had four riders at the head of the peloton. Matthews was able to hold on for the win, despite a late challenge from Davide Cimolai (Lampre–Merida) and Giacomo Nizzolo (Trek Factory Racing). Thanks to the bonus seconds he won on the line, Matthews took over the overall lead in the race, as well as the leadership of the points and young rider classifications.

Stage 3 result
Rank	Rider	Team	Time
1	Michael Matthews (AUS)	Orica–GreenEDGE	4h 32' 12"
2	Davide Cimolai (ITA)	Lampre–Merida	+ 0"
3	Giacomo Nizzolo (ITA)	Trek Factory Racing	+ 0"
4	Alexander Kristoff (NOR)	Team Katusha	+ 0"
5	José Joaquín Rojas (ESP)	Movistar Team	+ 0"
6	Matti Breschel (DEN)	Tinkoff–Saxo	+ 0"
7	Moreno Hofland (NED)	LottoNL–Jumbo	+ 0"
8	Nacer Bouhanni (FRA)	Cofidis	+ 0"
9	Bryan Coquard (FRA)	Team Europcar	+ 0"
10	Arnaud Démare (FRA)	FDJ	+ 0"

General classification after stage 3
Rank	Rider	Team	Time
1	Michael Matthews (AUS)	Orica–GreenEDGE	14h 25' 27"
2	Michał Kwiatkowski (POL)	Etixx–Quick-Step	+ 1"
3	Rohan Dennis (AUS)	BMC Racing Team	+ 1"
4	John Degenkolb (GER)	Team Giant–Alpecin	+ 3"
5	Tony Martin (GER)	Etixx–Quick-Step	+ 8"
6	Luis León Sánchez (ESP)	Astana	+ 11"
7	Sylvain Chavanel (FRA)	IAM Cycling	+ 11"
8	Tom Dumoulin (NED)	Team Giant–Alpecin	+ 14"
9	Geraint Thomas (GBR)	Team Sky	+ 14"
10	Philippe Gilbert (BEL)	BMC Racing Team	+ 14"

=== Stage 4 ===
12 March 2015 — Varennes-sur-Allier to Col de la Croix de Chaubouret, 204 km (126.8 mi)

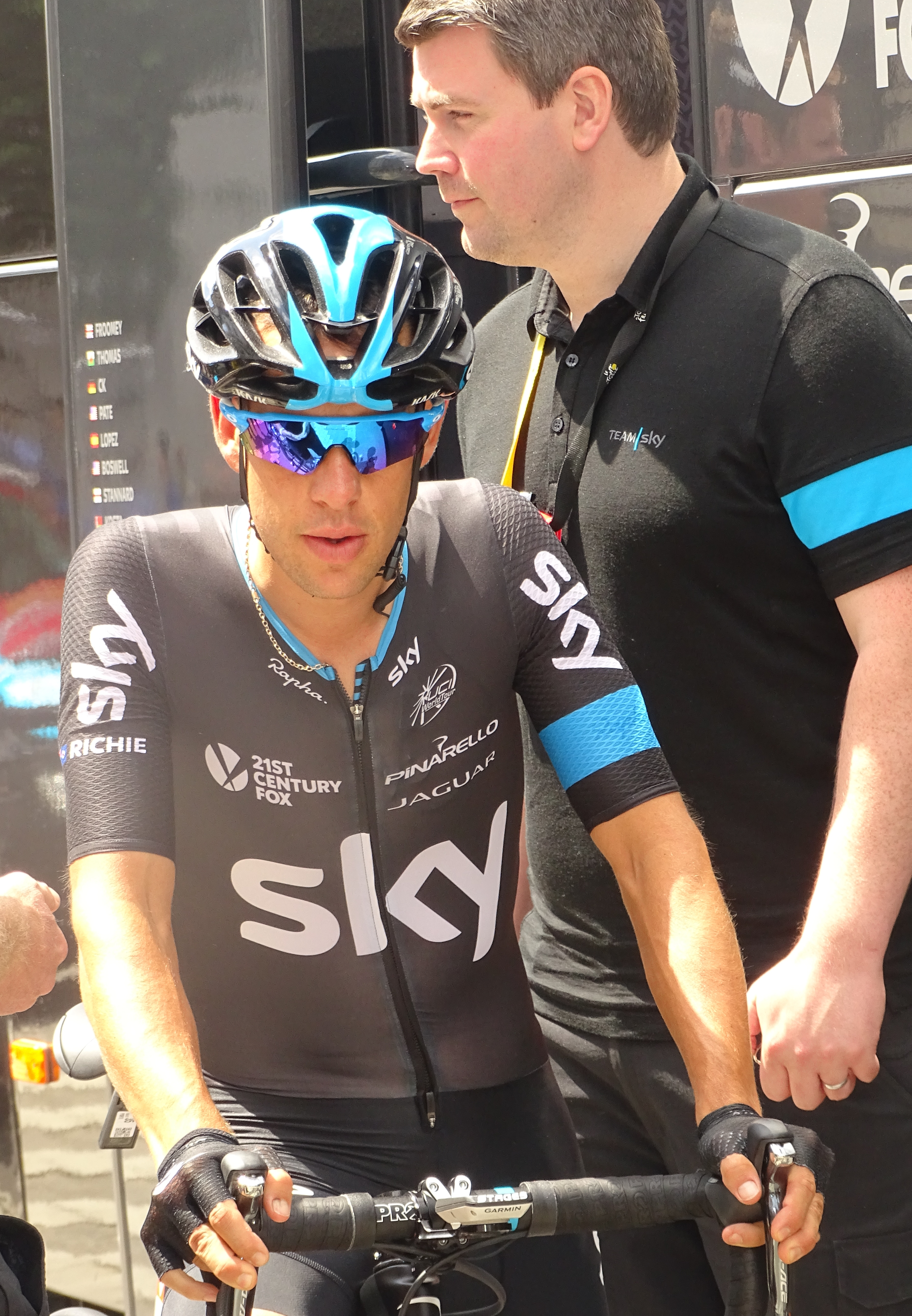
Richie Porte, photographed at the 2015 Tour de France, winner of stage four

The fourth stage of the race was the longest of the race: a 204-kilometre (126.8-mile) route from Varennes-sur-Allier to the Col de la Croix de Chaubouret, the only summit finish in the race. The route was hilly throughout, with two second-category and five third-category climbs before the final ascent. The Col de la Croix de Chaubouret was the highest point in the race at 1,201 m (3,940 ft), making this the queen stage of the 2015 Paris–Nice. It was a 10-kilometre (6-mile) climb averaging 6.7%, with some sections at 9%.

The early break was formed by Antoine Duchesne (Team Europcar), Thomas De Gendt (Lotto–Soudal) and Chris Anker Sørensen (Tinkoff–Saxo). They earned a lead of more than eight minutes, with De Gendt winning the first seven mountain sprints of the day. This won him enough points to put him in the lead of the mountains classification. Duchesne was dropped on the first second-category climb of the day, the Côte de La Gimond, which came after 152 kilometres (94 miles). Work in the main peloton from Orica–GreenEDGE had reduced the deficit significantly and, on the Côte de La Gimond, AG2R La Mondiale drove hard to split the peloton in two. Rafał Majka (Tinkoff–Saxo) was among the riders temporarily distanced, though his teammates were able to bring him back into the main group.

As they crossed the Col de La Gachet with 29 kilometres (18 miles) remaining, De Gendt and Sørensen had a lead of two minutes; this was reduced to less than a minute 3.5 kilometres (2.2 miles) later at the summit of the penultimate climb of the day, the Côte de la Croix Blanche. Andrew Talansky (Cannondale–Garmin) and Majka both suffered mechanical problems around the summit of this climb. Etixx–Quick-Step continued to chase the breakaway down and they were caught with 13 kilometres (8 miles) remaining.

At the base of the Col de la Croix de Chaubouret, Team Sky and the BMC Racing Team came to the head of the peloton. Sky's Lars Petter Nordhaug led the peloton through the first 4 kilometres (2.5 miles) of the climb, dropping Michael Matthews (Orica–GreenEDGE) along the way. Warren Barguil (Team Giant–Alpecin) crashed at the base of the climb; though he eventually finished the stage, he was unable to return to the main group. After Nordhaug pulled off, his teammate Nicolas Roche took over. His turn at the head of the group caused several riders to be distanced, including Talansky, Majka and Wilco Kelderman (LottoNL–Jumbo).

With 3 kilometres (1.9 miles) remaining, Roche pulled off and Geraint Thomas (Team Sky) attacked the small group of leaders. He gained a small lead and was joined by Jakob Fuglsang (Astana) and Simon Špilak (Team Katusha). Tejay van Garderen (BMC Racing Team) and Rubén Fernández (Movistar Team) attempted to bridge across, but Fernández, while looking at the group behind, cycled straight into van Garderen and crashed. Richie Porte (Team Sky) covered this move. He was again able to follow as Michał Kwiatkowski attacked. When Kwiatkowski had caught Thomas' group inside the final kilometre, Porte himself attacked. Thomas, his teammate, was the only rider able to follow him and they finished first and second on the stage. Kwiatkowski finished third, eight seconds behind. With the time bonuses won on the stage, Kwiatkowski was able to re-take the race lead; he was one second ahead of Porte with Thomas a further two seconds back.

Stage 4 result
Rank	Rider	Team	Time
1	Richie Porte (AUS)	Team Sky	5h 18' 39"
2	Geraint Thomas (GBR)	Team Sky	+ 0"
3	Michał Kwiatkowski (POL)	Etixx–Quick-Step	+ 8"
4	Jakob Fuglsang (DEN)	Astana	+ 8"
5	Tejay van Garderen (USA)	BMC Racing Team	+ 17"
6	Rui Costa (POR)	Lampre–Merida	+ 24"
7	Tony Gallopin (FRA)	Lotto–Soudal	+ 24"
8	Fabio Aru (ITA)	Astana	+ 24"
9	Rafael Valls (ESP)	Lampre–Merida	+ 24"
10	Simon Špilak (SLO)	Team Katusha	+ 24"

General classification after stage 4
Rank	Rider	Team	Time
1	Michał Kwiatkowski (POL)	Etixx–Quick-Step	19h 44' 11"
2	Richie Porte (AUS)	Team Sky	+ 1"
3	Geraint Thomas (GBR)	Team Sky	+ 3"
4	Tejay van Garderen (USA)	BMC Racing Team	+ 27"
5	Jakob Fuglsang (DEN)	Astana	+ 32"
6	Tony Gallopin (FRA)	Lotto–Soudal	+ 38"
7	Rui Costa (POR)	Lampre–Merida	+ 41"
8	Gorka Izagirre (ESP)	Movistar Team	+ 44"
9	Tiago Machado (POR)	Team Katusha	+ 50"
10	Rafael Valls (ESP)	Lampre–Merida	+ 51"

=== Stage 5 ===
13 March 2015 — Saint-Étienne to Rasteau, 192.5 km (119.6 mi)

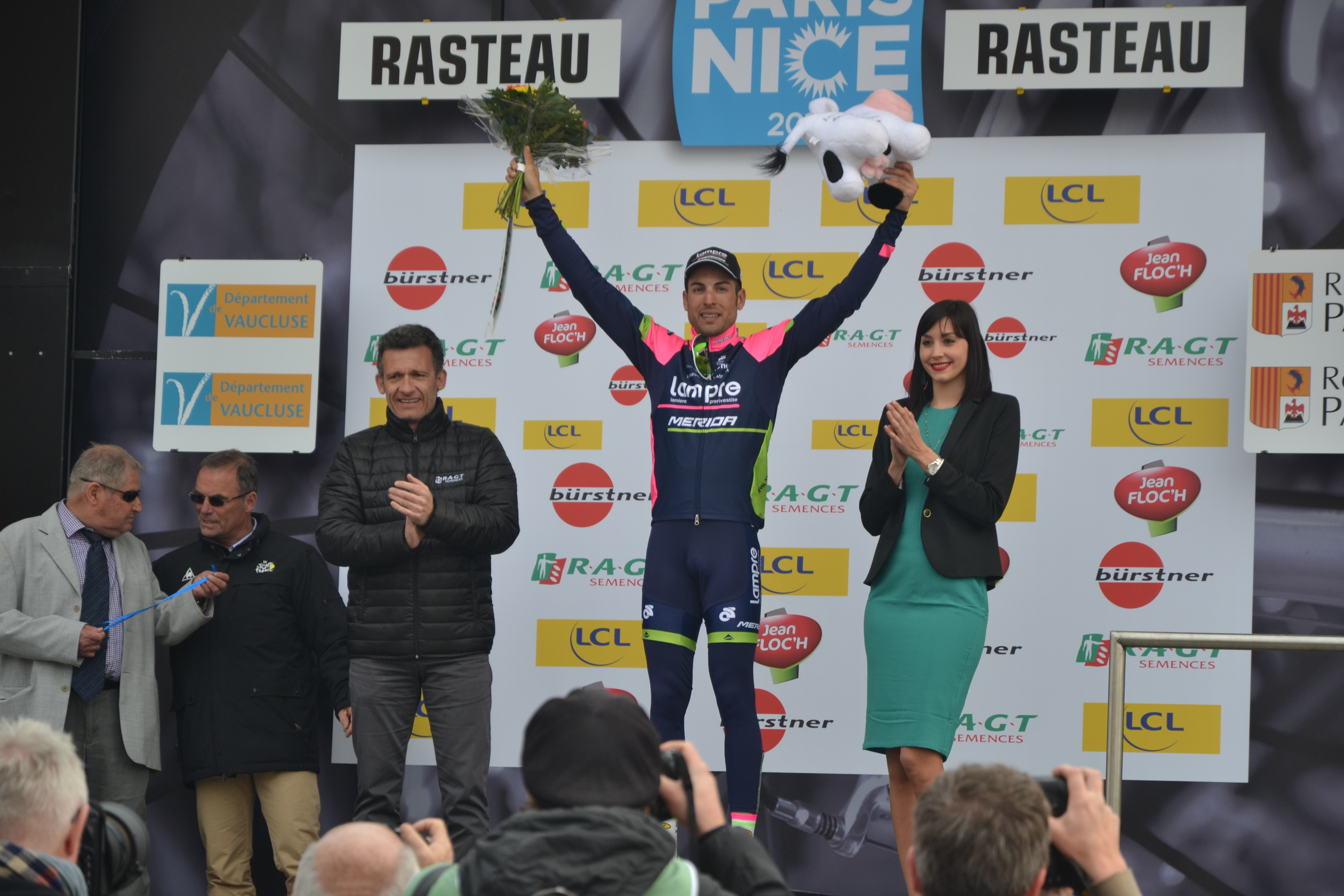
Davide Cimolai celebrating his victory of in the fifth stage.

The fifth stage of the race was a 192.5-kilometre (119.6-mile) route that started in Saint-Étienne, travelled south and ended in Rasteau. The course began with a first-category climb, the Col de la Republique, but the remainder of the stage was generally flat. Three categorised climbs were located in the second half of the stage (two third category and one second), with the final climb 8.5 kilometres (5 miles) from the stage finish. The final 500 m (1,640 ft) were uphill.

The break was formed on the first-category climb that began the day's racing. Thomas De Gendt (Lotto–Soudal), who had taken the lead of the mountains classification on stage four, attacked again. He was joined by Andrew Talansky (Cannondale–Garmin), Romain Sicard (Team Europcar), Egor Silin (Team Katusha) and Paweł Poljański (Tinkoff–Saxo). De Gendt won the mountain sprint on this climb and on all the other climbs of the day. The group was never allowed more than a four-minute lead, since Talansky was only 2' 51" behind Michał Kwiatkowski, the general classification leader. The chase was led by Kwiatkowski's Etixx–Quick-Step team, who were joined by Cofidis with 60 kilometres (37 miles) remaining. With 20 kilometres (12 miles) remaining and the gap at 1' 30", Team Sky's Bradley Wiggins moved to the front of the peloton. After Wiggins had reduced the gap, the BMC Racing Team took up the pace-setting.

Sicard and Poljański dropped out of the leading group on the final climb and, with less than 5 kilometres (3 miles) remaining and a lead of 25 seconds, an attack from De Gendt distanced Talansky too. Orica–GreenEDGE were now leading the chase behind but, with 3 kilometres (2 miles) left, the leading pair still had a 30-second lead. With 1 kilometre (0.6 miles) remaining, a final attack from De Gendt dropped Silin. De Gendt attempted to hold on for a solo victory, but he was unable to avoid the sprinters' teams. As he was caught, Bryan Coquard (Team Europcar) opened his sprint. Davide Cimolai (Lampre–Merida), however, was able to come past him in the final metres to take his second win of the year. Coquard finished second, with Michael Matthews (Orica–GreenEDGE) winning further points for the green jersey by finishing third. The top 10 of the general classification remained unchanged after the stage.

Stage 5 result
Rank	Rider	Team	Time
1	Davide Cimolai (ITA)	Lampre–Merida	4h 12' 09"
2	Bryan Coquard (FRA)	Team Europcar	+ 0"
3	Michael Matthews (AUS)	Orica–GreenEDGE	+ 0"
4	Nacer Bouhanni (FRA)	Cofidis	+ 0"
5	José Joaquín Rojas (ESP)	Movistar Team	+ 0"
6	Alexander Kristoff (NOR)	Team Katusha	+ 0"
7	Matti Breschel (DEN)	Tinkoff–Saxo	+ 0"
8	Daniel McLay (GBR)	Bretagne–Séché Environnement	+ 0"
9	Samuel Dumoulin (FRA)	AG2R La Mondiale	+ 0"
10	Sylvain Chavanel (FRA)	IAM Cycling	+ 0"

General classification after stage 5
Rank	Rider	Team	Time
1	Michał Kwiatkowski (POL)	Etixx–Quick-Step	23h 56' 20"
2	Richie Porte (AUS)	Team Sky	+ 1"
3	Geraint Thomas (GBR)	Team Sky	+ 3"
4	Tejay van Garderen (USA)	BMC Racing Team	+ 27"
5	Jakob Fuglsang (DEN)	Astana	+ 32"
6	Tony Gallopin (FRA)	Lotto–Soudal	+ 38"
7	Rui Costa (POR)	Lampre–Merida	+ 41"
8	Gorka Izagirre (ESP)	Movistar Team	+ 44"
9	Tiago Machado (POR)	Team Katusha	+ 50"
10	Rafael Valls (ESP)	Lampre–Merida	+ 51"

=== Stage 6 ===
14 March 2015 — Vence to Nice, 181.5 km (112.8 mi)

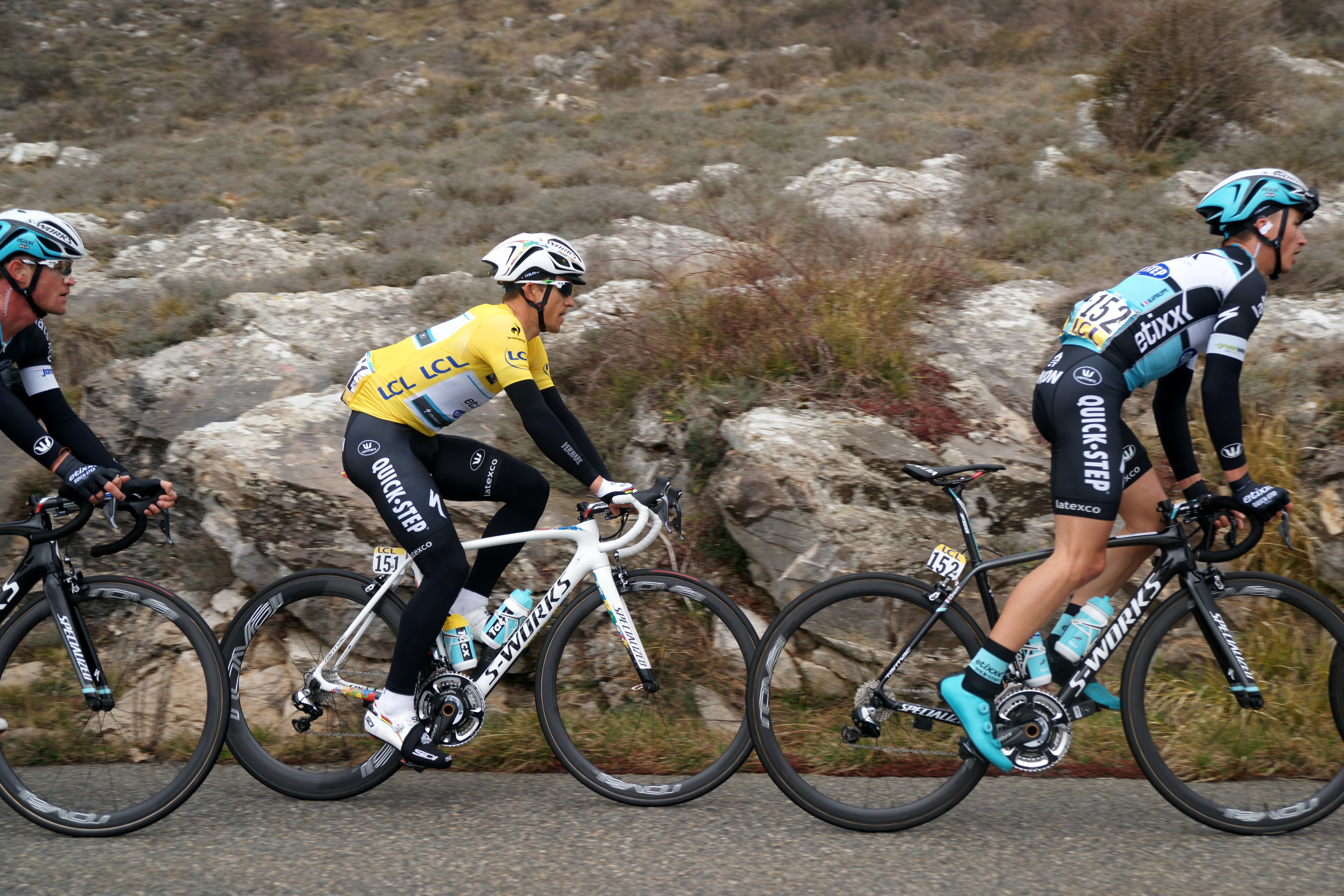
General classification leader Michał Kwiatkowski climbing the Col de Vence.

The final road stage of the race was a 181.5-kilometre (112.8-mile) route starting in Vence and ending on the Promenade des Anglais in Nice. The route was mountainous throughout: it included three first-category climbs and three second-category climbs. The summit of the final climb, the Côte de Peille, came with 27 kilometres (17 miles) remaining, as the riders descended into Nice down the Col d'Èze. The end of the descent came with approximately 2 kilometres (1.2 miles) remaining, with a flat run to the finishing line.

A large breakaway escaped in the early part of the stage. This included 31 riders, representing a variety of teams but not Team Sky or Etixx–Quick-Step. Tim Wellens (Lotto–Soudal) was the best placed rider on general classification, 1' 25" behind Michał Kwiatkowski; he was the virtual leader of the race through much of the day. Wellens' teammate Thomas De Gendt was also in the breakaway: he won the first two climbs of the day to increase his lead in the mountains classification.

The first major attacks came with about 60 kilometres (37 miles) remaining: Kwiatkowski attacked with three teammates (Tony Martin, Julian Alaphilippe and Michał Gołaś), briefly gaining a lead of half a minute. Team Sky were able to catch them. After the next climb, the Col Saint-Roch, the same four riders attacked, with Tony Gallopin (Lotto–Soudal) following. They again gained a half-minute lead, while Sky had just one domestique left to help Richie Porte and Geraint Thomas. Etixx–Quick-Step were unable to continue their pressure, however, on the Côte de Peille, Gallopin attacked after sensing that Kwiatkowski was vulnerable. Near the top of the climb, Porte and Thomas caught Kwiatkowski's group, then attacked them and left them behind. They were joined by several riders, including Simon Špilak (Team Katusha) and Jakob Fuglsang (Astana).

At the summit of the final climb, therefore, Gallopin had a lead over the Porte and Thomas group, with Kwiatkowski struggling in another group behind. On the descent, however, Porte and Thomas both crashed in separate incidents; they were recaptured by Kwiatkowski's group. After the final stage, Porte attributed these crashes to over-inflated tyres.) Gallopin won the final intermediate sprint and the bonus seconds, ahead of the chasing group that was led by Rui Costa (Lampre–Merida) and Fuglsang. Gallopin, however, was able to extend his lead throughout the long descent. He won the stage solo, more than 30 seconds ahead of the first chasing group. Porte and Thomas were over a minute behind, with Kwiatkowski losing an additional two seconds on the finish line. Gallopin, who had been 38" behind Kwiatkowski, took the race lead. He was now 36" ahead of Porte, with Kwiatkowski, Thomas, Fuglsang and Costa within six seconds of him. Gallopin said after the stage that, while he hoped to defend his yellow jersey in the final stage time trial on the Col d'Èze, it would be difficult to stay ahead of Porte.

Stage 6 result
Rank	Rider	Team	Time
1	Tony Gallopin (FRA)	Lotto–Soudal	4h 52' 57"
2	Simon Špilak (SLO)	Team Katusha	+ 32"
3	Rui Costa (POR)	Lampre–Merida	+ 32"
4	Jakob Fuglsang (DEN)	Astana	+ 32"
5	Rafael Valls (ESP)	Lampre–Merida	+ 35"
6	Michael Valgren (DEN)	Tinkoff–Saxo	+ 1' 00"
7	Tim Wellens (BEL)	Lotto–Soudal	+ 1' 00"
8	Sylvain Chavanel (FRA)	IAM Cycling	+ 1' 00"
9	Arthur Vichot (FRA)	FDJ	+ 1' 00"
10	Nicolas Edet (FRA)	Cofidis	+ 1' 00"

General classification after stage 6
Rank	Rider	Team	Time
1	Tony Gallopin (FRA)	Lotto–Soudal	28h 49' 42"
2	Richie Porte (AUS)	Team Sky	+ 36"
3	Michał Kwiatkowski (POL)	Etixx–Quick-Step	+ 37"
4	Geraint Thomas (GBR)	Team Sky	+ 38"
5	Jakob Fuglsang (DEN)	Astana	+ 38"
6	Rui Costa (POR)	Lampre–Merida	+ 42"
7	Simon Špilak (SLO)	Team Katusha	+ 53"
8	Rafael Valls (ESP)	Lampre–Merida	+ 1' 01"
9	Gorka Izagirre (ESP)	Movistar Team	+ 1' 19"
10	Tim Wellens (BEL)	Lotto–Soudal	+ 2' 00"

=== Stage 7 ===
15 March 2015 — Nice to Col d'Èze, 9.6 km (6.0 mi)

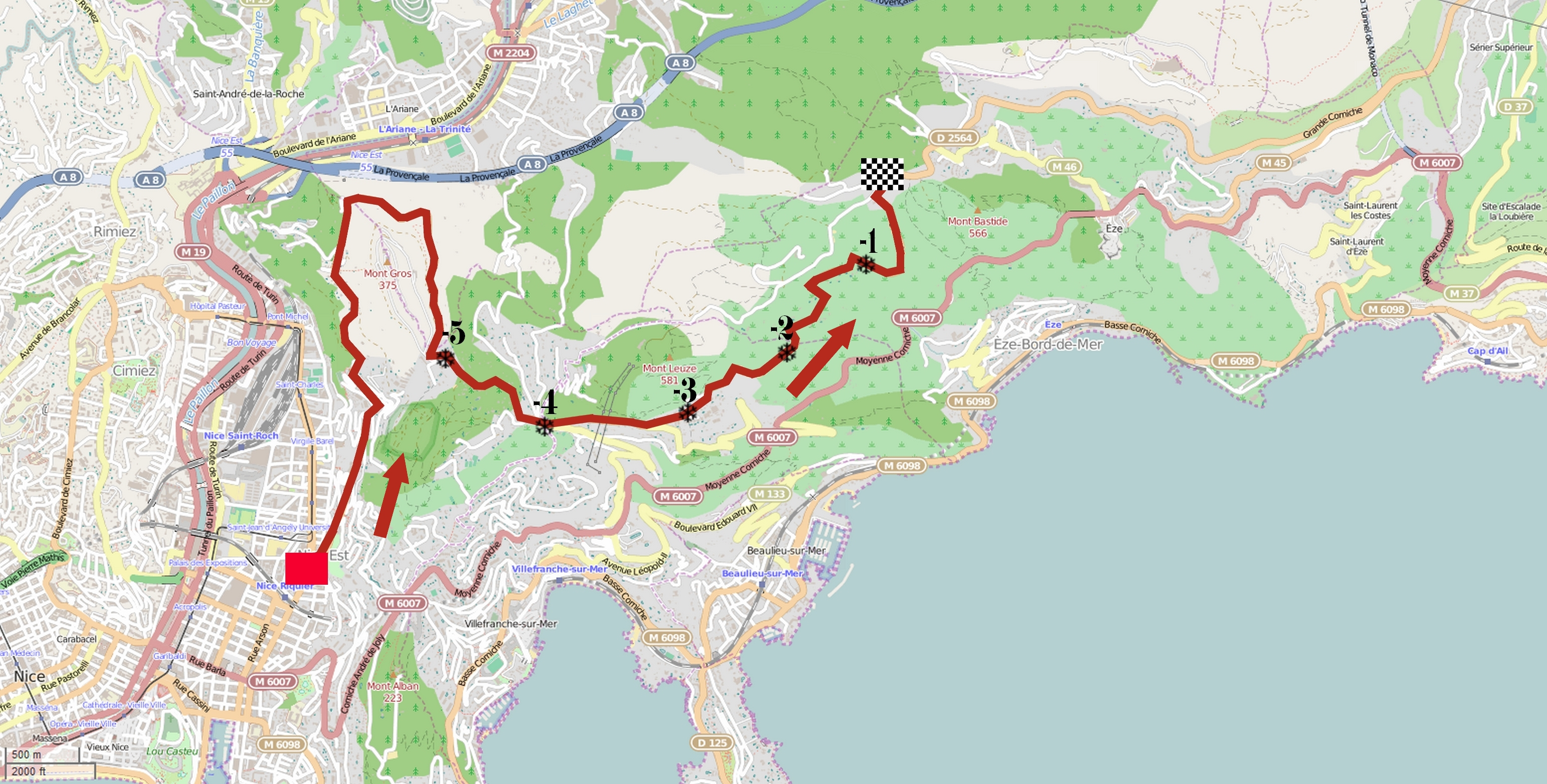
Stage seven route

The 2015 Paris–Nice concluded with a mountain time trial on the Col d'Èze. The 9.6-kilometre (6.0-mile) course began in Nice and had an average gradient of 4.7%. The steepest part of the climb came in the early stages: the second kilometre had an average gradient of 8.5%. The intermediate timing point came at the Col des Quatre Chemins, 4 kilometres (2 miles) from the finish. The final 1.5 kilometres (0.9 miles) towards the summit of the Col d'Èze were contested on a false flat. This time trial was the traditional final stage of Paris–Nice, though it was absent from the 2014 edition. The last time the course was used, in the last stage of the 2013 Paris–Nice, the stage was won by Richie Porte (Team Sky), securing his overall race victory. As was customary in time trial stages, the riders set off in reverse order from where they were ranked in the general classification at the end of the previous stage. The race was held in rainy and windy conditions.

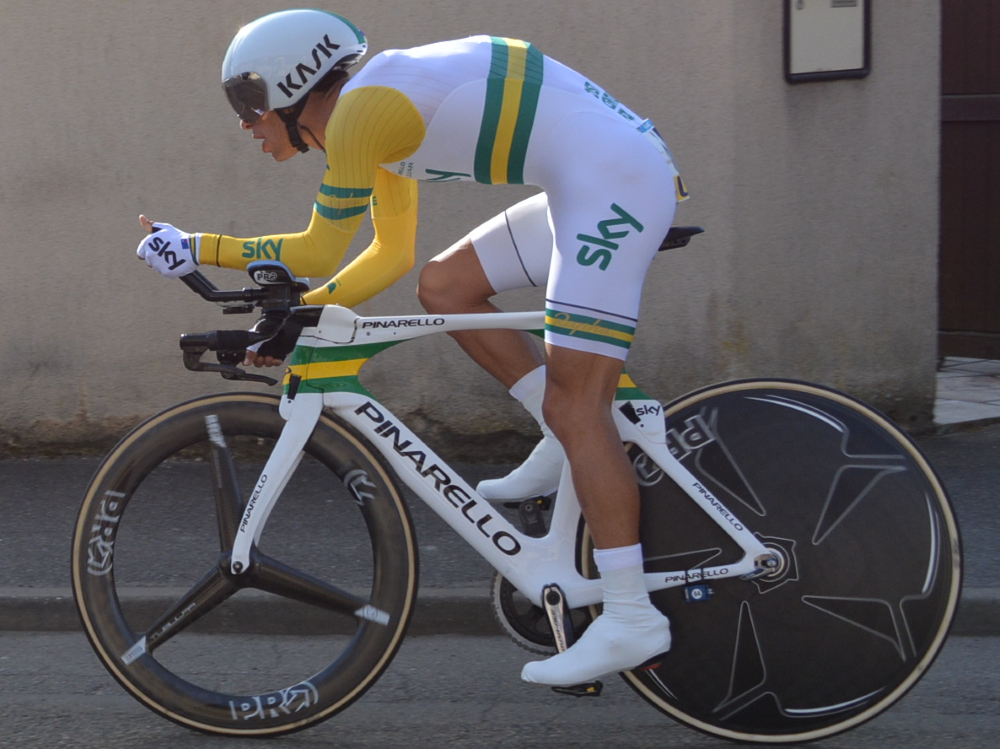
Richie Porte, the national time trial champion of Australia, winner of stage seven and the general classification.

The first major news of the day was that Bradley Wiggins (Team Sky), who had won the stage in the 2012 Paris–Nice and who was the reigning world time trial champion, would not start the stage. He had been in 103rd place overnight, more than 56 minutes behind race leader Tony Gallopin. The first rider to set off was Stijn Vandenbergh (Etixx–Quick-Step), who recorded a time of 23' 37". Alexander Kristoff (Team Katusha) completed the course in 22' 11" and led the race for a while. Sérgio Paulinho (Tinkoff–Saxo) briefly took over the lead, before he was overtaken by Thomas De Gendt (Lotto–Soudal), whose time was 21' 19". Rein Taaramäe (Cofidis) recorded a better time, but was immediately beaten by the next rider, Andrew Talansky (Cannondale–Garmin). Talansky's time was 21' 00"; he led until former world time trial champion Tony Martin (Etixx–Quick-Step) became the first rider to complete the course in under 21 minutes. Martin was the leader of the stage until the final few riders completed the course. Simon Špilak (Team Katusha) was the first of the general classification contenders to beat Martin; his time was 20' 36". This was enough to beat many of the other contenders for the overall classification: Rui Costa (Lampre–Merida), Geraint Thomas (Team Sky) and Michał Kwiatkowski (Etixx–Quick-Step) all finished behind Špilak. Porte, in second place overnight, was the only rider able to beat Špilak's time: Porte was 11 seconds ahead at the intermediate time check and finished the stage 13 seconds ahead.

The final rider to set off was Gallopin (Lotto–Soudal). Gallopin was 36 seconds ahead of Porte overnight and expressed hope that he would be able to defend his lead and take overall victory. Immediately after he set off, however, he was nervous and uncomfortable on his bike. Gallopin, like most of the riders, was riding a conventional road bike with aero bars attached. At the intermediate time check, he was already 58 seconds behind Porte; he lost another 41 seconds in the second part of the stage. His time of 22' 02" meant he finished 29th on the stage and lost the yellow jersey. He dropped to sixth place overall. Porte therefore won both the stage and the overall victory in the race, his first general classification victory since he won Paris–Nice in 2013. Kwiatkowski's fifth place on the stage was enough to ensure both second place overall (30 seconds behind Porte) and victory in the young rider classification. Špilak finished on the same overall time as Kwiatkowski in third place, with Costa also on the same time in fourth.

Stage 7 result
Rank	Rider	Team	Time
1	Richie Porte (AUS)	Team Sky	20' 23"
2	Simon Špilak (SLO)	Team Katusha	+ 13"
3	Rui Costa (POR)	Lampre–Merida	+ 24"
4	Tony Martin (GER)	Etixx–Quick-Step	+ 29"
5	Michał Kwiatkowski (POL)	Etixx–Quick-Step	+ 29"
6	Andrew Talansky (USA)	Cannondale–Garmin	+ 37"
7	Geraint Thomas (GBR)	Team Sky	+ 39"
8	Ion Izagirre (ESP)	Movistar Team	+ 50"
9	Tim Wellens (BEL)	Lotto–Soudal	+ 54"
10	Gorka Izagirre (ESP)	Movistar Team	+ 55"

Final general classification
Rank	Rider	Team	Time
1	Richie Porte (AUS)	Team Sky	29h 10' 41"
2	Michał Kwiatkowski (POL)	Etixx–Quick-Step	+ 30"
3	Simon Špilak (SLO)	Team Katusha	+ 30"
4	Rui Costa (POR)	Lampre–Merida	+ 30"
5	Geraint Thomas (GBR)	Team Sky	+ 41"
6	Tony Gallopin (FRA)	Lotto–Soudal	+ 1' 03"
7	Jakob Fuglsang (DEN)	Astana	+ 1' 05"
8	Rafael Valls (ESP)	Lampre–Merida	+ 1' 24"
9	Gorka Izagirre (ESP)	Movistar Team	+ 1' 38"
10	Tim Wellens (BEL)	Lotto–Soudal	+ 2' 18"

== Classification leadership table ==
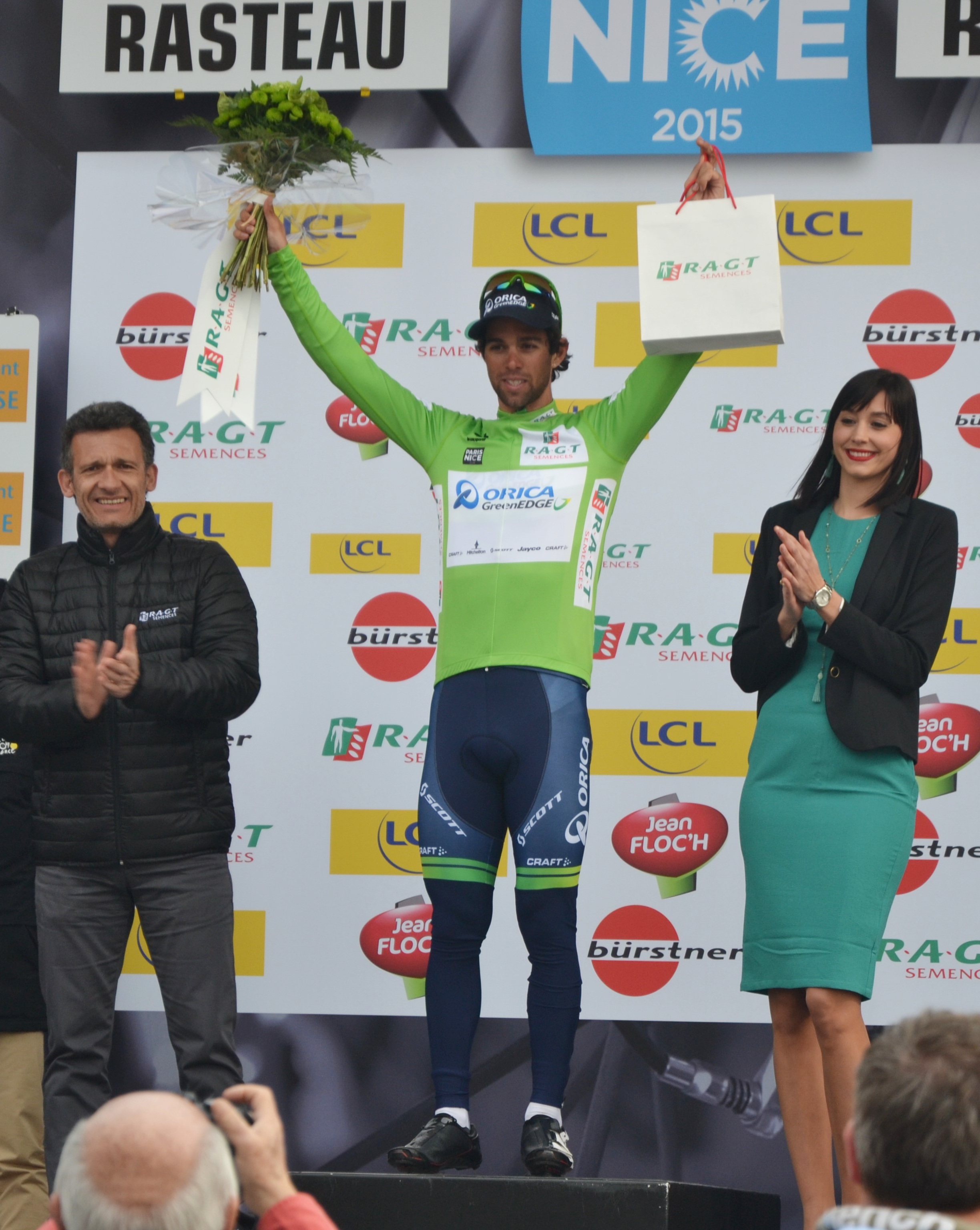
Michael Matthews, awarded the green jersey as leader of the points classification after stage five

In the 2015 Paris–Nice, four jerseys were awarded. The general classification was calculated by adding each cyclist's finishing times on each stage. Time bonuses were awarded to the first three finishers on road stages (stages 1–6): the stage winner won a ten-second bonus, with six and four seconds for the second and third riders respectively. Bonus seconds were also awarded to the first three riders at intermediate sprints (three seconds for the winner of the sprint, two seconds for the rider in second and one second for the rider in third. The leader of the general classification received a yellow jersey. This classification was considered the most important of the 2015 Paris–Nice, and the winner of the classification was considered the winner of the race.

Points for stage victory
Position	1	2	3	4	5	6	7	8	9	10
Points awarded	15	12	9	7	6	5	4	3	2	1

The second classification was the points classification. Riders were awarded points for finishing in the top ten in a stage. Unlike in the points classification in the Tour de France, the winners of all stages were awarded the same number of points. Points were also won in intermediate sprints; three points for crossing the sprint line first, two points for second place, and one for third. The leader of the points classification was awarded a green jersey.

There was also a mountains classification, for which points were awarded for reaching the top of a climb before other riders. Each climb was categorised as either first, second, or third-category, with more points available for the more difficult, higher-categorised climbs. For first-category climbs, the top seven riders earned points; on second-category climbs, five riders won points; on third-category climbs, only the top three riders earned points. The leadership of the mountains classification was marked by a white jersey with red polka-dots.

The fourth jersey represented the young rider classification, marked by a white jersey. Only riders born after 1 January 1990 were eligible; the young rider best placed in the general classification was the leader of the young rider classification.

There was also a classification for teams, in which the times of the best three cyclists in a team on each stage were added together; the leading team at the end of the race was the team with the lowest cumulative time.

Stage	Winner	General classification	Points classification	Mountains classification	Young rider classification	Teams classification
P	Michał Kwiatkowski	Michał Kwiatkowski	Michał Kwiatkowski	Not awarded	Michał Kwiatkowski	BMC Racing Team
1	Alexander Kristoff	Michał Kwiatkowski	Michał Kwiatkowski	Jonathan Hivert	Michał Kwiatkowski	BMC Racing Team
2	André Greipel	Michał Kwiatkowski	Alexander Kristoff	Jonathan Hivert	Michał Kwiatkowski	BMC Racing Team
3	Michael Matthews	Michael Matthews	Michael Matthews	Philippe Gilbert	Michael Matthews	BMC Racing Team
4	Richie Porte	Michał Kwiatkowski	Michael Matthews	Thomas De Gendt	Michał Kwiatkowski	Astana
5	Davide Cimolai	Michał Kwiatkowski	Michael Matthews	Thomas De Gendt	Michał Kwiatkowski	Astana
6	Tony Gallopin	Tony Gallopin	Michael Matthews	Thomas De Gendt	Michał Kwiatkowski	Team Sky
7	Richie Porte	Richie Porte	Michael Matthews	Thomas De Gendt	Michał Kwiatkowski	Team Sky
Final		Richie Porte	Michael Matthews	Thomas De Gendt	Michał Kwiatkowski	Team Sky
