= 2004 Paris–Nice =

Race details
- Dates: 7–14 March 2004
- Stages: 8
- Distance: 1,126.7 km (700.1 mi)
- Winning time: 28h 00' 01"

Results
Jersey awarded to the overall winner	Winner	Jörg Jaksche (GER)	(Team CSC)
	Second	Davide Rebellin (ITA)	(Gerolsteiner)
	Third	Bobby Julich (USA)	(Team CSC)
Jersey awarded to the points classification winner	Points	Davide Rebellin (ITA)	(Gerolsteiner)
Jersey awarded to the mountains classification winner	Mountains	Aitor Osa (ESP)	(Illes Balears–Banesto)

The 2004 Paris–Nice was the 62nd edition of the Paris–Nice cycle race and was held from 7 March to 14 March 2004. The race started in Chaville and finished in Nice. The race was won by Jörg Jaksche of Team CSC.

== Teams ==
Twenty teams, containing a total of 160 riders, participated in the race:

- T-Mobile Team
- Rabobank
- Team CSC
- Cofidis
- U.S. Postal Service
- Quick-Step–Davitamon
- FDJeux.com
- Euskaltel–Euskadi
- Lotto–Domo
- AG2R Prévoyance
- Crédit Agricole
- Fassa Bortolo
- Liberty Seguros
- Gerolsteiner
- Illes Balears–Banesto
- Chocolade Jacques–Wincor Nixdorf
- Alessio–Bianchi
- Brioches La Boulangère
- Phonak
- R.A.G.T. Semences–MG Rover

== Route ==
Stage characteristics and winners
Stage	Date	Course	Distance	Type	Winner
1	7 March	Chaville to Vanves	13.2 km (8.2 mi)	Individual time trial	Jörg Jaksche (GER)
2	8 March	Chaville to Montargis	166.5 km (103.5 mi)	Flat stage	Pedro Horrillo (ESP)
3	9 March	La Chapelle-Saint-Ursin to Roanne	229 km (142 mi)	Hilly stage	Léon van Bon (NED)
4	10 March	Roanne to Le Puy-en-Velay	179 km (111 mi)	Medium mountain stage	Stage cancelled
5	11 March	Le Puy-en-Velay to Rasteau	215 km (134 mi)	Hilly stage	Alexander Vinokourov (KAZ)
6	12 March	Rasteau to Gap	173.5 km (107.8 mi)	Medium mountain stage	Denis Menchov (RUS)
7	13 March	Digne-les-Bains to Cannes	185.5 km (115.3 mi)	Medium mountain stage	Alexander Vinokourov (KAZ)
8	14 March	Nice to Nice	144 km (89 mi)	Hilly stage	Alexander Vinokourov (KAZ)

== Stages ==
=== Stage 1 ===
7 March 2004 — Chaville to Vanves, 13.2 km (8.2 mi) (ITT)

	Cyclist	Team	Time
1	Jörg Jaksche (GER)	Team CSC	17'19"
2	Davide Rebellin (SUI)	Gerolsteiner	+ 4"
3	Erik Dekker (NED)	Rabobank	s.t.

=== Stage 2 ===
8 March 2004 — Chaville to Montargis, 166.5 km (103.5 mi)

	Cyclist	Team	Time
1	Pedro Horrillo (ESP)	Quick-Step–Davitamon	3h 47'55"
2	Beat Zberg (SUI)	Gerolsteiner	s.t.
3	Michele Bartoli (ITA)	Team CSC	s.t.

=== Stage 3 ===
9 March 2004 — La Chapelle-Saint-Ursin to Roanne, 229 km (142 mi)

	Cyclist	Team	Time
1	Léon van Bon (NED)	Lotto–Domo	5h 38'18"
2	Thomas Ziegler (GER)	Gerolsteiner	s.t.
3	Tom Boonen (BEL)	Quick-Step–Davitamon	+ 25"

=== Stage 4 ===
10 March 2004 — Roanne to Le Puy-en-Velay, 179 km (111 mi)

Stage cancelled because of heavy snowfall.

=== Stage 5 ===
11 March 2004 — Le Puy-en-Velay to Rasteau, 215 km (134 mi)

	Cyclist	Team	Time
1	Alexander Vinokourov (KAZ)	T-Mobile Team	5h 06'15"
2	Jörg Jaksche (GER)	Team CSC	+ 4"
3	Michele Bartoli (ITA)	Team CSC	s.t.

=== Stage 6 ===
12 March 2004 — Rasteau to Gap, 173.5 km (107.8 mi)

	Cyclist	Team	Time
1	Denis Menchov (RUS)	Illes Balears–Banesto	4h 52'22"
2	Samuel Sánchez (ESP)	Euskaltel–Euskadi	s.t.
3	Floyd Landis (USA)	U.S. Postal Service	s.t.

=== Stage 7 ===
13 March 2004 — Digne-les-Bains to Cannes, 185.5 km (115.3 mi)

	Cyclist	Team	Time
1	Alexander Vinokourov (KAZ)	T-Mobile Team	4h 39'02"
2	Kim Kirchen (LUX)	Fassa Bortolo	+ 18
3	Jens Voigt (GER)	Team CSC	s.t.

=== Stage 8 ===
14 March 2004 — Nice to Nice, 144 km (89 mi)

	Cyclist	Team	Time
1	Alexander Vinokourov (KAZ)	T-Mobile Team	3h 35'43"
2	Denis Menchov (RUS)	Illes Balears–Banesto	s.t.
3	Torsten Hiekmann (GER)	T-Mobile Team	+ 1'37"

== General Standings ==
	Cyclist	Team	Time
1	Jörg Jaksche (GER)	Team CSC	28h 00' 01"
2	Davide Rebellin (ITA)	Gerolsteiner	+ 15"
3	Bobby Julich (USA)	Team CSC	+ 43"
4	Jens Voigt (GER)	Team CSC	s.t.
5	George Hincapie (USA)	U.S. Postal Service	+ 46"
6	Frank Vandenbroucke (BEL)	Fassa Bortolo	+ 57"
7	Óscar Pereiro (ESP)	Phonak	+ 1'01"
8	Michael Rogers (AUS)	Quick-Step–Davitamon	+ 1'09"
9	Fränk Schleck (LUX)	Team CSC	+ 1'36"
10	José Azevedo (POR)	U.S. Postal Service	+ 1'46"

== Mountains Classification ==
	Cyclist	Team
1	Aitor Osa (ESP)	Illes Balears–Banesto
2	Erik Dekker (NED)	Rabobank
3	David Moncoutié (FRA)	Cofidis

== Points Classification ==
	Cyclist	Team
1	Davide Rebellin (ITA)	Gerolsteiner
2	Jens Voigt (GER)	Team CSC
3	Alexander Vinokourov (KAZ)	T-Mobile Team
