= Patxi Vila =

Spanish cyclist

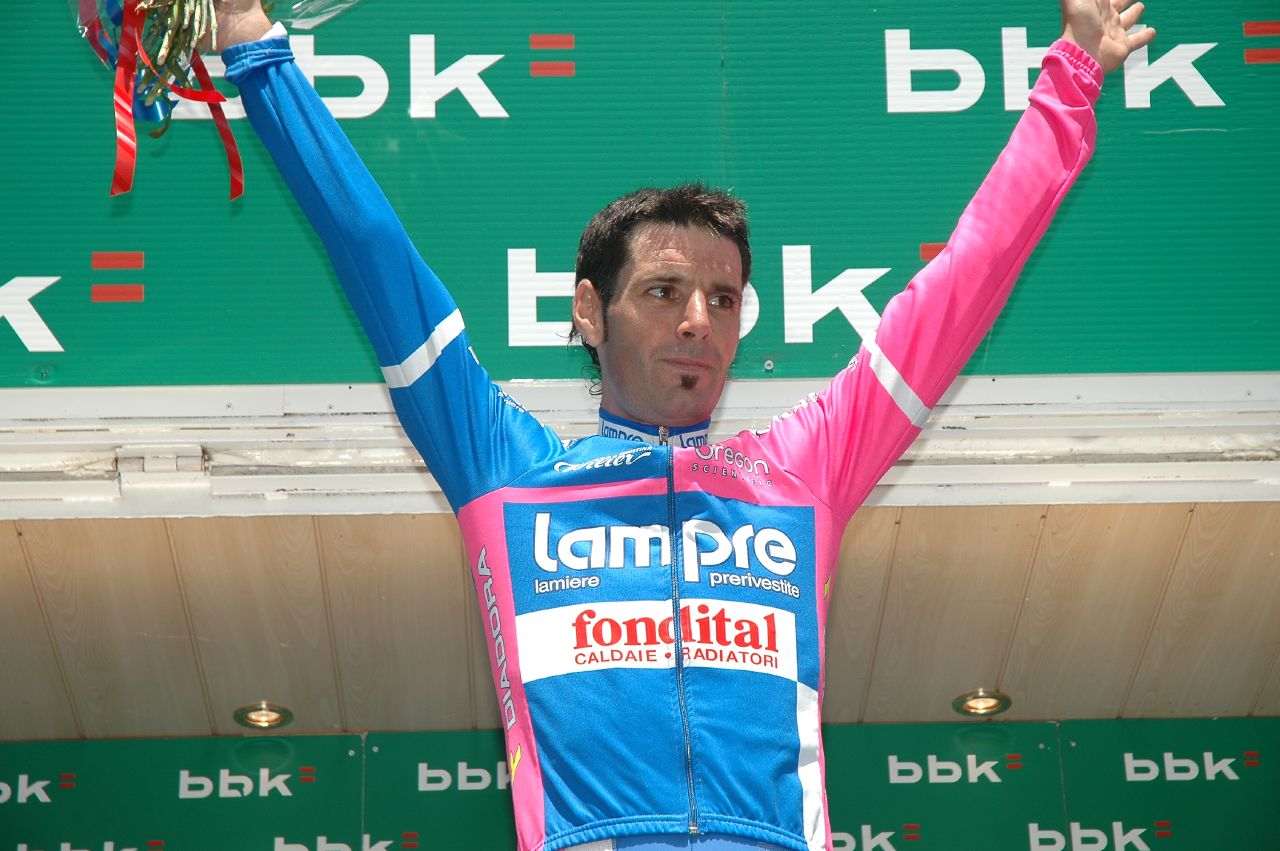

Personal information
- Full name: Francisco Javier Vila Errandonea
- Nickname: Patxi
- Born: 11 October 1975 (age 51) Hondarribia, Spain
- Height: 1.80 m (5 ft 11 in)
- Weight: 67 kg (148 lb)

Cycling career
- Sport: Cycling
- Current team: Movistar Team
- Discipline: Road
- Role: Directeur sportif

Amateur team
- 1999–2000: Caja Rural

Professional teams
- 2001–2002: iBanesto.com
- 2003–2008: Lampre
- 2011: De Rosa–Ceramica Flaminia
- 2012: Utensilnord–Named

Managerial teams
- 2015–2016: Tinkoff–Saxo
- 2017–2019: Bora–Hansgrohe
- 2020–: Movistar Team

Major wins
- Paris–Nice – 1 stage (2006)

Francisco Javier "Patxi" Vila Errandonea (born 11 October 1975 in Hondarribia, Basque Country) is a Spanish Basque former professional road bicycle racer who rides for the UCI Professional Continental team Szuper Beton. He was formerly with UCI ProTeam Lampre, before being banned for 18 months after testing positive for the use of testosterone.

Vila's most notable victory came in stage 3 of the 2006 Paris–Nice where he snatched onto the wheel of Floyd Landis as he escaped on the Col de Croix de Chaubouret. The duo amassed a lead of over a minute on their nearest contenders and Vila swept past Landis to take the stage. This performance catapulted him to second overall on the general classification, 9 seconds behind Floyd Landis. He finished the race in Nice still 9 seconds behind winner Floyd Landis and 56 seconds ahead of Antonio Colom.

He finished the 2006 UCI ProTour in 38th place with 69 points, the third highest ranked Lampre–Fondital rider behind Alessandro Ballan and Damiano Cunego.

After retiring from competition Vila worked for Specialized Bicycle Components as a performance specialist before joining Tinkoff–Saxo in 2015 as a directeur sportif.

== Major results ==
- 2006 Paris–Nice – 1 stage

== See also ==
- List of doping cases in cycling
