= Nicolas Crosbie =

French professional road bicycle racer

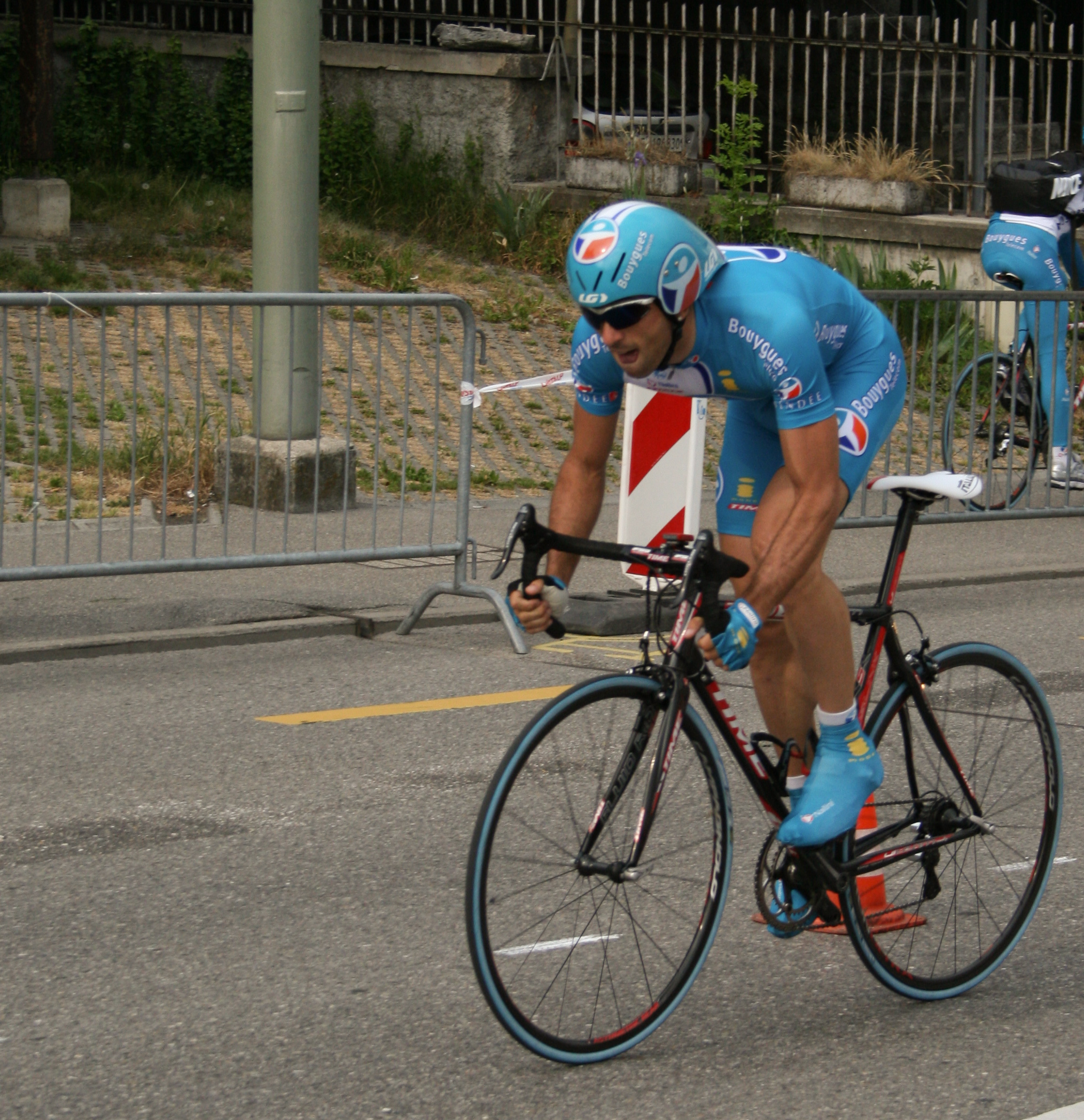
- Crosbie in 2007

Personal information
- Full name: Nicolas Crosbie
- Born: 2 April 1980 (age 46) Niort, France
- Height: 1.75 m (5 ft 9 in)
- Weight: 64 kg (141 lb)

Cycling career
- Sport: Cycling
- Current team: none
- Discipline: Road
- Role: Rider

Professional teams
- 2005–2006: Agritubel
- 2007–2008: Bouygues Télécom

Nicolas Crosbie (born 2 April 1980 in Niort, Deux-Sèvres) is a French professional road bicycle racer who is currently unattached.

== Palmares ==
- 2007 Giro d'Italia - 88th
- Tour de la Guadeloupe - 1 stage (2004)
