= Col de la Croix de Chaubouret =

Mountain pass in France

Coordinates: 45.3675°N 4.5283°E

The Col de la Croix de Chaubouret (elevation 1,201 metres (3,940 ft)) is a mountain pass in France, located in the Pilat massif in the Loire. It is between Graix and Le Bessat.

== Details of the Climb ==
Starting from Bourg-Argental (south), the Col de la Croix de Chaubouret is 13.90 km long. Over this distance, the climb has an elevation gain of 656 m (an average of 4.72%). The steepest section is 8.5%.

Starting from Saint Chamond (north), the Col de la Croix de Chaubouret is 15.80 km long. Over this distance, the climb has an elevation gain of 839 m (an average of 5.31%). The steepest section is 7.8%.

Starting from Saint-Étienne (west), the Col de la Croix de Chaubouret is 16 km long. Over this distance, the climb has an elevation gain of 611 m (an average of 3.82%). The steepest section is 7.2%.

== Tour de France ==
The climb has been used in the Tour de France eleven times. It was most recently used in 1999.

=== Appearances in the Tour de France ===
Year	Stage	Category	Start	Finish	Leader at the summit
1999	11	2	Le Bourg-d'Oisans	Saint-Étienne	Ludo Dierckxsens (BEL)
1997	12 (ITT)	2	Saint-Étienne		Jan Ullrich (GER)
1995	11	3	Le Bourg-d'Oisans	Saint-Étienne	Hernán Buenahora (COL)
1992	15	2	Le Bourg-d'Oisans	Saint-Étienne	Franco Chioccioli (ITA)
1990	13	2	Villard-de-Lans	Saint-Étienne	Greg LeMond (USA)
1986	19	3	Villard-de-Lans	Saint-Étienne	Julián Gorospe (ESP)
1985	14	4	Autrans	Saint-Étienne	Luis Herrera (COL)
1980	19	2	Voreppe	Saint-Étienne	Ismael Lejarreta (ESP)
1978	15	2	Saint-Dier-d'Auvergne	Saint-Étienne	Michel Pollentier (BEL)
1977	18	2	Rossignol Voiron	Saint-Étienne	~~Joachim Agostinho (POR)~~
1950	20 (ITT)	3	Saint-Étienne	Lyon	Ferdinand Kübler (SUI)
