= Rasteau =

- Commune
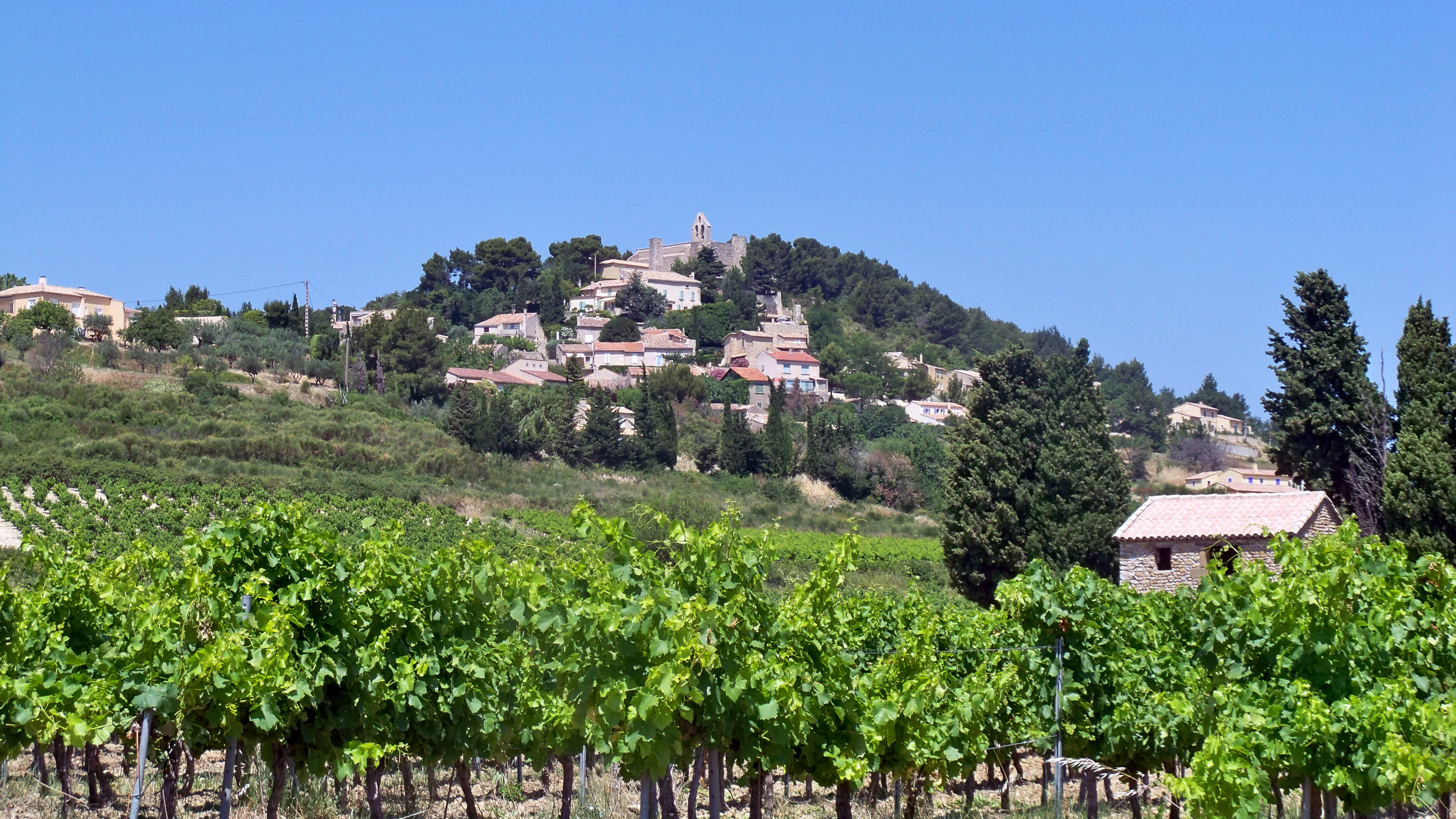
- View of Rasteau

- Coat of arms
- Location of Rasteau
- Location within France Location within Provence-Alpes-Côte d'Azur
- Coordinates: 44°13′52″N 4°59′16″E
- Country: France
- Region: Provence-Alpes-Côte d'Azur
- Department: Vaucluse
- Arrondissement: Carpentras
- Canton: Vaison-la-Romaine
- Intercommunality: Vaison Ventoux

Government
  - Mayor (2020–2026): Laurent Robert
- Area^{1}: 18.81 km^{2} (7.26 sq mi)
- Elevation: 220 m (720 ft)
- Highest elevation: 366 m (1,201 ft)
- Lowest elevation: 117 m (384 ft)
- Population (2023): 813
  - Density: 43.2/km^{2} (112/sq mi)
- Time zone: UTC+01:00 (CET)
  - Summer (DST): UTC+02:00 (CEST)
- INSEE/Postal code: 84096 /84110
- ^{1} French Land Register data, which excludes lakes, ponds, glaciers > 1 km^{2} (0.386 sq mi or 247 acres) and river estuaries.

Rasteau (French pronunciation: [ʁasto]; Occitan: Lo Rastèu) is a commune in the Vaucluse department in the Provence-Alpes-Côte d'Azur region in southeastern France.

== Town twins ==
- Houyet, Belgium (since 1991)

== See also ==
- Communes of the Vaucluse department
- Rasteau AOC, a wine appellation covering Rasteau and some neighbouring communes
