= 2018 GP Nacional 2 de Portugal =

2018 UCI Europe Tour

Race details
- Dates: July 18–22, 2018
- Stages: 5
- Distance: 764.5 km (475.0 mi)
- Winning time: 18h 00' 18"

Results
Jersey awarded to the overall winner	Winner	~~Raúl Alarcón~~ (ESP)	(W52 / FC Porto)
	Second	Mario González (ESP)	(Sporting / Tavira)
	Third	David de la Fuente (ESP)	(Aviludo–Louletano)
Jersey awarded to the points classification winner	Points	João Matias (POR)	(Vito–Feirense–BlackJack)
Jersey awarded to the mountains classification winner	Mountains	~~Raúl Alarcón~~ (ESP)	(W52 / FC Porto)
Jersey awarded to the youth classification winner	Youth	Cyril Barthe (FRA)	(Euskadi–Murias)
Jersey awarded to the sprints classification winner	Sprints	Txomin Juaristi (ESP)	(Fundación Euskadi)
	Team	W52 / FC Porto	

The 2018 GP Nacional 2 de Portugal (Portuguese: 2018 Grande Prémio de Portugal Nacional 2) was the first edition of the GP Nacional 2 de Portugal cycle race and was held from 18 July to 22 July 2018 as part of the 2018 UCI Europe Tour; it was categorised as a 2.2 race.

The race was won by Raúl Alarcón, riding for the W52 / FC Porto team. However, in March 2021, due to doping all his results obtained between July 28, 2015 and October 21, 2019, were cancelled, including 2018 Volta a Portugal.

== Teams ==
The 20 teams invited to the race were:

UCI Professional Continental teams

- Caja Rural–Seguros RGA
- Euskadi–Murias

UCI Continental teams

- Rádio Popular–Boavista
- Sporting / Tavira
- Aviludo–Louletano
- Efapel
- W52 / FC Porto
- Vito–Feirense–BlackJack
- Miranda–Mortágua
- Liberty Seguros–Carglass
- LA Alumínios
- Fundación Euskadi
- MsTina–Focus
- Massi–Kuwait
- Team Sapura Cycling

Under 23 teams

- Fortuna–Maia
- Sicasal–Constantinos–Delta Cafés
- FGP–Cube–Bombarral
- AMPO

National teams

- Military Team France Défense

== Stages ==
Stage characteristics and winners
Stage	Date	Course	Distance	Type	Winner
1	18 July	Chaves to Castro Daire	140.7 km (87 mi)	Mountain stage	~~Raúl Alarcón~~
2	19 July	Castro Daire to Pedrógão Grande	177.2 km (110 mi)	Medium mountain stage	Julen Irizar
3	20 July	Pedrógão Grande to Montargil	144.1 km (90 mi)	Hilly stage	Óscar Pelegrí
4	21 July	Montargil to Aljustrel	159.7 km (99 mi)	Flat stage	Riccardo Stacchiotti
5	22 July	Ferreira do Alentejo to Faro	142.8 km (89 mi)	Flat stage	João Matias
	Total		764.5 km (475 mi)		

== Classification leadership ==
Classification leadership by stage
Stage	Winner	General classification	Points classification	Mountains classification	Sprints classification	Young rider classification	Team classification
1	~~Raúl Alarcón~~	~~Raúl Alarcón~~	~~Raúl Alarcón~~	~~Raúl Alarcón~~	~~Raúl Alarcón~~	Cyril Barthe	W52 / FC Porto
2	Julen Irizar	~~Raúl Alarcón~~	Mario González	~~Raúl Alarcón~~	Txomin Juaristi	Cyril Barthe	W52 / FC Porto
3	Óscar Pelegrí	~~Raúl Alarcón~~	Mario González	~~Raúl Alarcón~~	Txomin Juaristi	Cyril Barthe	W52 / FC Porto
4	Riccardo Stacchiotti	~~Raúl Alarcón~~	Mario González	~~Raúl Alarcón~~	Txomin Juaristi	Cyril Barthe	W52 / FC Porto
5	João Matias	~~Raúl Alarcón~~	João Matias	~~Raúl Alarcón~~	Txomin Juaristi	Cyril Barthe	W52 / FC Porto
Final		~~Raúl Alarcón~~	João Matias	Raúl Alarcón	Txomin Juaristi	Cyril Barthe	W52 / FC Porto

- In stage two, David de la Fuente, who was second in the points classification, wore the green jersey, because first placed Raúl Alarcón wore the yellow jersey as leader of the general classification.
- In stage two, João Rodrigues, who was second in the mountains classification, wore the blue jersey, because first placed Raúl Alarcón wore the yellow jersey as leader of the general classification.
- In stage two, Rui Vinhas, who was second in the best sprints classification, wore the white jersey, because first placed Raúl Alarcón wore the yellow jersey as leader of the general classification.
- In stage three, João Rodrigues, who was second in the mountains classification, wore the blue jersey, because first placed Raúl Alarcón wore the yellow jersey as leader of the general classification.
- In stage four, João Rodrigues, who was second in the mountains classification, wore the blue jersey, because first placed Raúl Alarcón wore the yellow jersey as leader of the general classification.
- In stage five, João Rodrigues, who was second in the mountains classification, wore the blue jersey, because first placed Raúl Alarcón wore the yellow jersey as leader of the general classification.

== Final standings ==
Legend
General classification	Denotes the winner of the general classification	Points classification	Denotes the leader of the points classification
Mountains classification	Denotes the leader of the mountains classification	Young rider classification	Denotes the winner of the young rider classification
Sprints classification	Denotes the leader of the sprints classification		

=== General classification ===
Final general classification (1–10)
Rank	Rider	Team	Time
1	~~Raúl Alarcón (ESP)~~	W52 / FC Porto	18h 00' 18"
2	Mario González (ESP)	Sporting / Tavira	+ 2' 39"
3	David de la Fuente (ESP)	Aviludo–Louletano	+ 2' 43"
4	Márcio Barbosa (POR)	Aviludo–Louletano	+ 2' 43"
5	Cyril Barthe (FRA)	Euskadi–Murias	+ 2' 45"
6	Edgar Pinto (POR)	Vito–Feirense–BlackJack	+ 2' 53"
7	Rafael Silva (POR)	Efapel	+ 2' 55"
8	César Fonte (POR)	W52 / FC Porto	+ 2' 56"
9	Juan López-Cózar (ESP)	Fundación Euskadi	+ 3' 01"
10	Fabricio Ferrari (URU)	Caja Rural–Seguros RGA	+ 3' 04"

=== Points classification ===
Final points classification (1–10)
Rank	Rider	Team	Points
1	João Matias (POR)	Vito–Feirense–BlackJack	54
2	Mario González (ESP)	Sporting / Tavira	44
3	Óscar Pelegri (ESP)	Rádio Popular–Boavista	41
4	Cyril Barthe (FRA)	Euskadi–Murias	32
5	Rafael Silva (POR)	Efapel	30
6	Dylan Page (SUI)	Team Sapura Cycling	30
7	Riccardo Stacchiotti (ITA)	MsTina–Focus	29
8	~~Raúl Alarcón~~ (ESP)	W52 / FC Porto	25
9	David de la Fuente (ESP)	Aviludo–Louletano	22
10	Álvaro Cuadros (ESP)	Caja Rural–Seguros RGA	20

=== Mountains classification ===
Final mountains classification (1–10)
Rank	Rider	Team	Points
1	~~Raúl Alarcón~~ (ESP)	W52 / FC Porto	18
2	João Rodrigues (POR)	W52 / FC Porto	12
3	César Fonte (POR)	W52 / FC Porto	7
4	Filipe Cardoso (POR)	Rádio Popular–Boavista	6
5	Juan López-Cózar (ESP)	Fundación Euskadi	5
6	Txomin Juaristi (ESP)	Fundación Euskadi	5
7	Guillaume Almeida (POR)	Fortuna–Maia	4
8	Álvaro Trueba (ESP)	Sporting / Tavira	3
9	Gonzalo Serrano (ESP)	Caja Rural–Seguros RGA	3
10	Julien Amadori (FRA)	Military Team France Défense	3

=== Sprints classification ===
Final mountains classification (1–10)
Rank	Rider	Team	Points
1	Txomin Juaristi (ESP)	Fundación Euskadi	8
2	Márcio Barbosa (POR)	Aviludo–Louletano	7
3	Ibai Azurmendi (ESP)	Fundación Euskadi	6
4	Guillaume Almeida (POR)	Fortuna–Maia	6
5	Diego López (ESP)	Fundación Euskadi	6
6	Bruno Silva (POR)	Efapel	5
7	~~Raúl Alarcón~~ (ESP)	W52 / FC Porto	3
8	Mario González (ESP)	Sporting / Tavira	3
9	David de la Fuente (ESP)	Aviludo–Louletano	3
10	Juan López-Cózar (ESP)	Fundación Euskadi	3

=== Young rider classification ===
Final young rider classification (1–10)
Rank	Rider	Team	Time
1	Cyril Barthe (FRA)	Euskadi–Murias	18h 03' 03"
2	André Carvalho (POR)	Liberty Seguros–Carglass	+ 0' 23"
3	José Neves (POR)	W52 / FC Porto	+ 0' 24"
4	Mikel Alonso (ESP)	Fundación Euskadi	+ 0' 28"
5	Daniel Silva (POR)	Sicasal–Constantinos–Delta Cafés	+ 1' 23"
6	Emil Dima (ROU)	MsTina–Focus	+ 1' 27"
7	Gonçalo Leaça (POR)	LA Alumínios	+ 1' 28"
8	Francisco Campos (POR)	Miranda–Mortágua	+ 1' 33"
9	Rafael Lourenço (POR)	Liberty Seguros–Carglass	+ 2' 00"
10	Jorge Magalhães (POR)	Miranda–Mortágua	+ 2' 11"

=== Team classification ===
Final team classification (1–10)
Rank	Team	Time
1	W52 / FC Porto	54h 07' 14"
2	Fundación Euskadi	+ 2' 27"
3	Aviludo–Louletano	+ 3' 07"
4	Efapel	+ 4' 45"
5	Caja Rural–Seguros RGA	+ 5' 46"
6	Sporting / Tavira	+ 6' 09"
7	Miranda–Mortágua	+ 6' 29"
8	Rádio Popular–Boavista	+ 10' 24"
9	Vito–Feirense–BlackJack	+ 14' 49"
10	Liberty Seguros–Carglass	+ 20' 40"
