= 2021 Tour of Slovenia =

2021 UCI Europe Tour 2021 UCI ProSeries
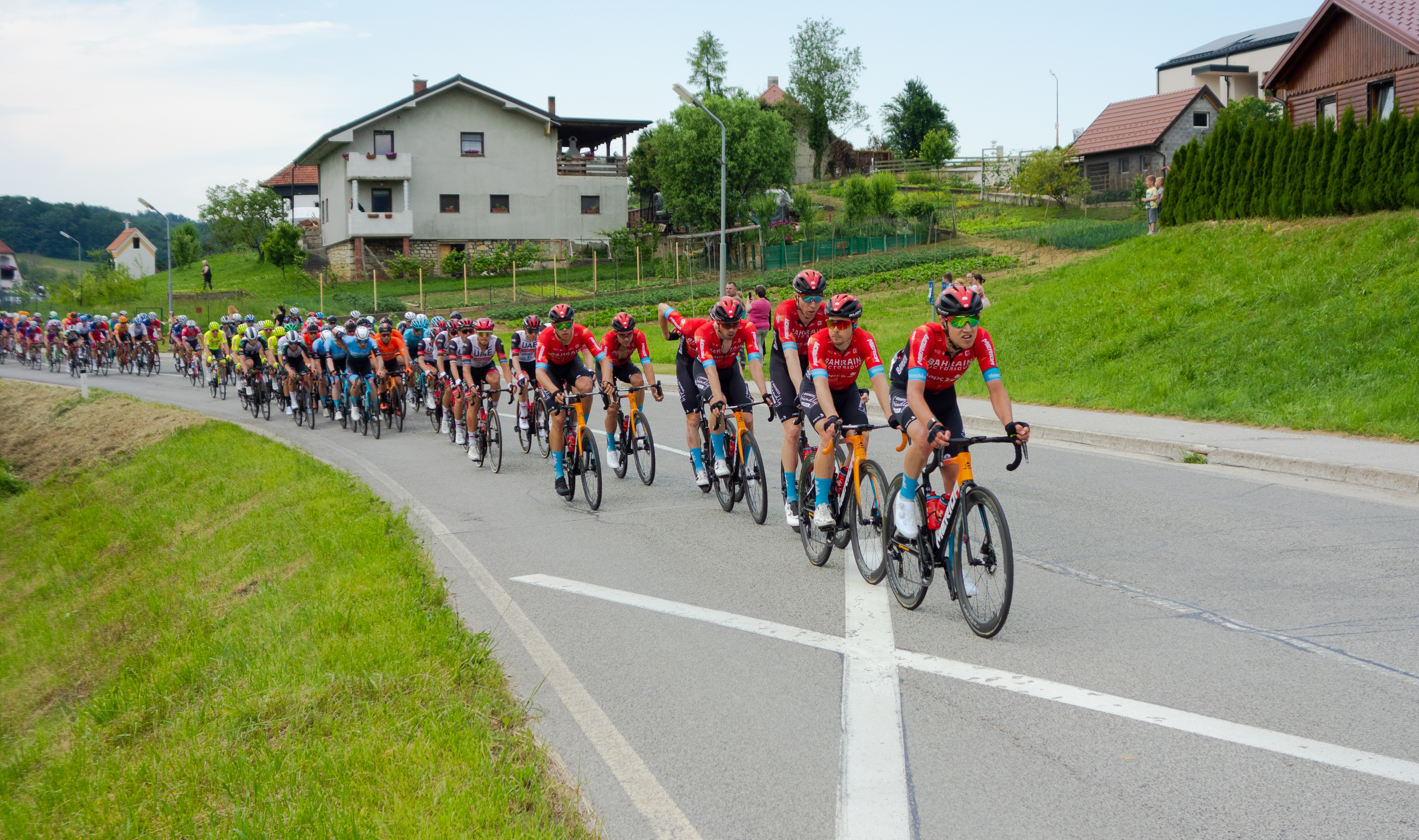
- Team Bahrain Victorious leading the peloton on Stage 1

Race details
- Dates: 9–13 June 2021
- Stages: 5
- Distance: 803.7 km (499.4 mi)
- Winning time: 19h 23' 31"

Results
Jersey awarded to the overall winner	Winner	(Slovenia) Tadej Pogačar	(UAE Team Emirates)
	Second	(Italy) Diego Ulissi	(UAE Team Emirates)
	Third	(Italy) Matteo Sobrero	(Astana–Premier Tech)
Jersey awarded to the points classification winner	Points	(Slovenia) Matej Mohorič	(Team Bahrain Victorious)
Jersey awarded to the mountains classification winner	Mountains	(Slovenia) Tadej Pogačar	(UAE Team Emirates)
Jersey awarded to the young rider classification winner	Young rider	(Slovenia) Kristjan Hočevar	(Adria Mobil)
	Team	(United Arab Emirates) UAE Team Emirates	

The 2021 Tour of Slovenia (Slovene: Dirka po Sloveniji) was the 27th edition of the Tour of Slovenia stage race that was held from 9 to 13 June 2021. The 2.Pro-category race was initially scheduled to be a part of the inaugural edition of the UCI ProSeries, but after the 2020 edition was cancelled due to the COVID-19 pandemic, it made its UCI ProSeries debut in 2021, while also still being a part of the 2021 UCI Europe Tour. This was second time Tour of Slovenia was participated by Tour de France winner, 2011 by Carlos Sastre and in 2021 by Tadej Pogačar.

The race was won for the first time by Tadej Pogačar of UAE Team Emirates. Pogačar first took the lead when he attacked on the climb of Svetina, the penultimate climb on stage 2. He proceeded to extend his lead to more than a minute on the way to the finish in Celje. He successfully defended his lead on the final three stages, including finishing second to his teammate, Diego Ulissi, on the queen stage to Nova Gorica. Total sum of prizes was 64,766 €.

== Teams ==
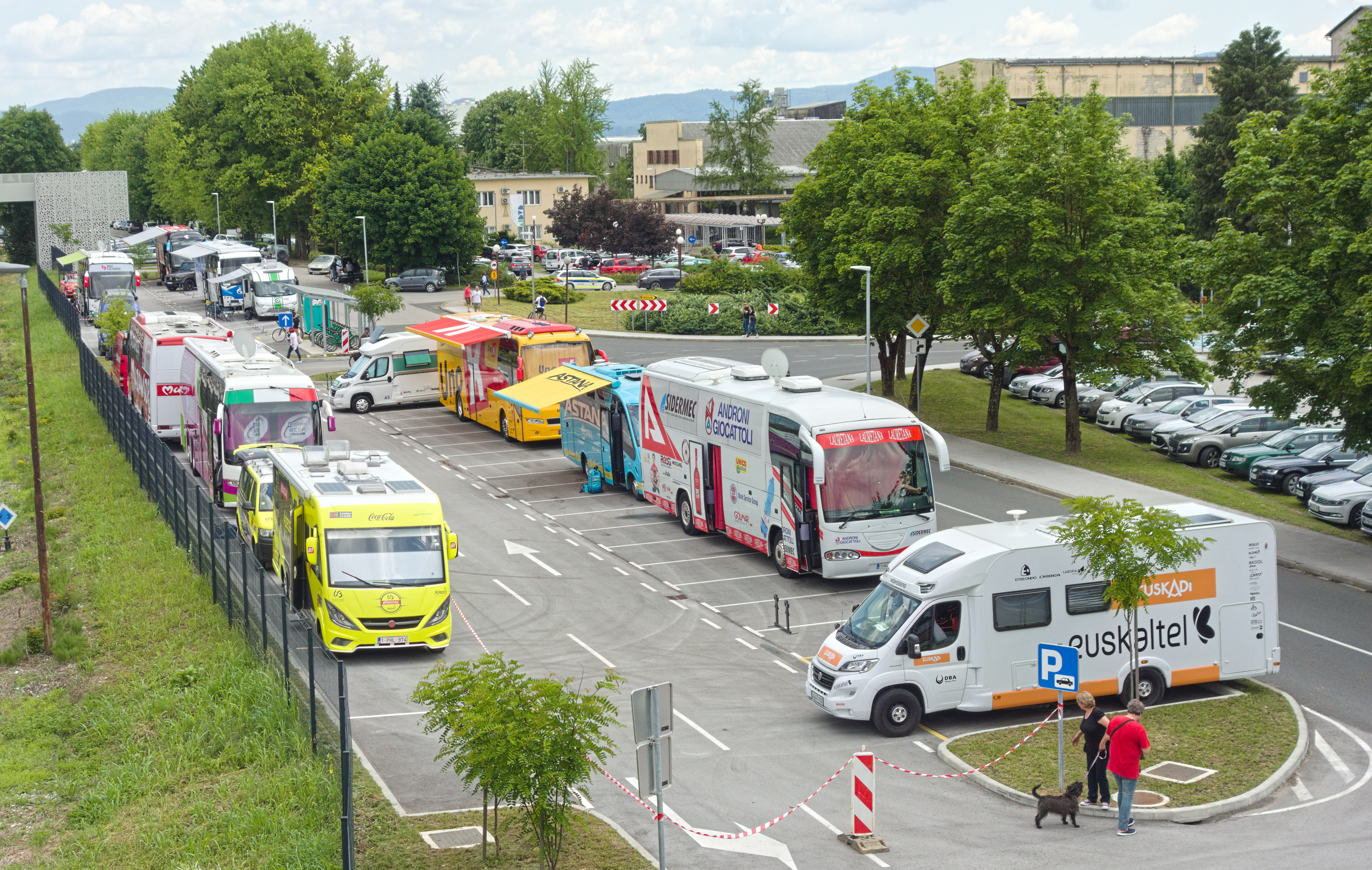
Teams Bus Park near the finish line in Krško on stage 3

Four UCI WorldTeams, eight UCI ProTeams, seven UCI Continental teams, and the Slovenian national team made up the twenty teams that participated in the race. Astana–Premier Tech, with six riders, was the only team to not field a full squad of seven riders. Of the 139 riders to start the race, 117 finished.

UCI WorldTeams

- Astana–Premier Tech
- Team Bahrain Victorious
- Team BikeExchange
- UAE Team Emirates

UCI ProTeams

- Androni Giocattoli–Sidermec
- Bardiani–CSF–Faizanè
- Bingoal Pauwels Sauces WB
- Caja Rural–Seguros RGA
- Equipo Kern Pharma
- Euskaltel–Euskadi
- Gazprom–RusVelo
- Uno-X Pro Cycling Team

UCI Continental Teams

- Adria Mobil
- Canyon dhb SunGod
- Dukla Banská Bystrica
- HRE Mazowsze Serce Polski
- Ljubljana Gusto Santic
- Ribble Weldtite
- Team ColoQuick

National Teams

- Slovenia

== Route and stages ==
Stage characteristics and winners
Stage	Date	Course	Distance	Type	Winner
1	9 June	Ptuj – Rogaška Slatina	151.5 km (94.1 mi)	Flat stage	(Germany) Phil Bauhaus
2	10 June	Žalec – Celje	147 km (91 mi)	Hilly stage	(Slovenia) Tadej Pogačar
3	11 June	Brežice – Krško	165.8 km (103.0 mi)	Hilly stage	(Spain) Jon Aberasturi
4	12 June	Ajdovščina – Nova Gorica	164.1 km (102.0 mi)	Mountain stage	(Italy) Diego Ulissi
5	13 June	Ljubljana – Novo mesto	175.3 km (108.9 mi)	Flat stage	(Germany) Phil Bauhaus
Total			803.7 km (499.4 mi)		

=== Stage 1 ===
9 June 2021 – Ptuj to Rogaška Slatina, 151.5 km (94.1 mi)

Stage 1

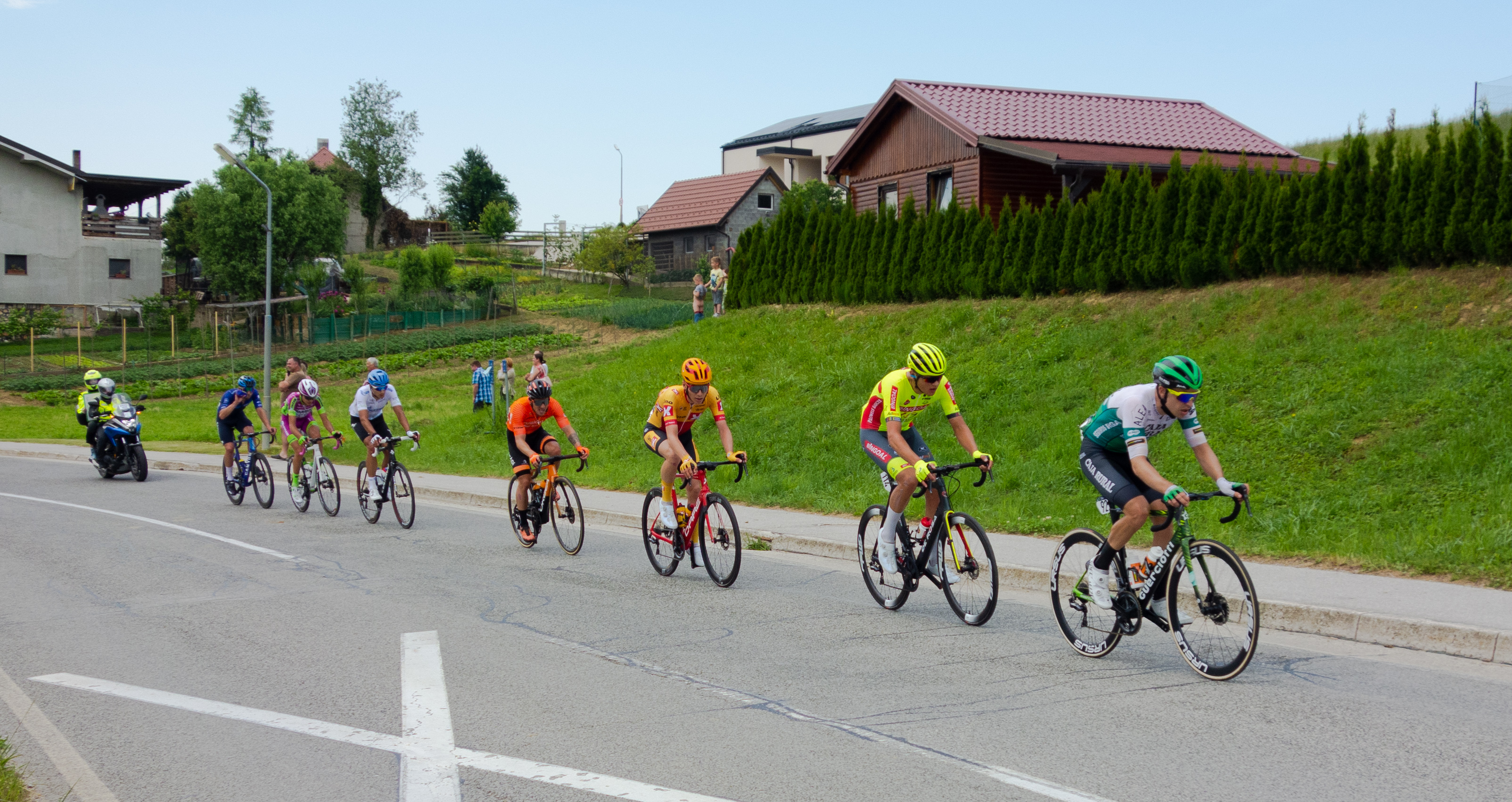
The main breakaway group on Stage 1. From right to left: Aritz Bagües (Caja Rural–Seguros RGA), Mathijs Paasschens (Bingoal Pauwels Sauces WB), Jonas Iversby Hvideberg (Uno-X Pro Cycling Team), Antonio Angulo (Euskaltel–Euskadi), Dmitry Strakhov (Gazprom–RusVelo), Luca Covili (Bardiani–CSF–Faizanè), and Jacob Scott (Canyon dhb SunGod)

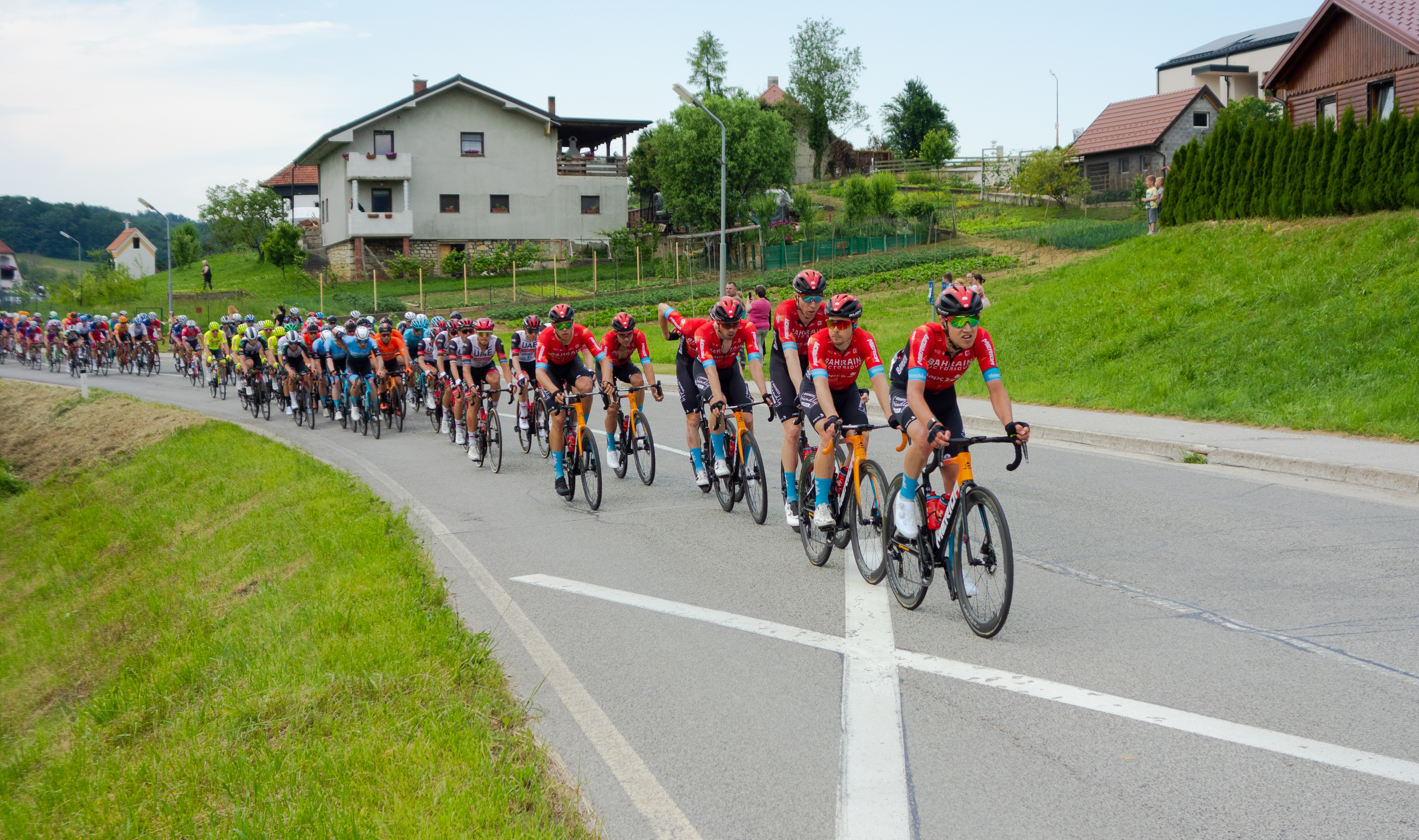
Peloton was led by Team Bahrain Victorious

Rank	Rider	Team	Time
Official results
1	(Germany) Phil Bauhaus	Team Bahrain Victorious	3h 33' 45"
2	(Spain) Jon Aberasturi	Caja Rural–Seguros RGA	+ 0"
3	(Portugal) Rui Oliveira	UAE Team Emirates	+ 0"
4	(Poland) Stanisław Aniołkowski	Bingoal Pauwels Sauces WB	+ 0"
5	(Italy) Matteo Malucelli	Androni Giocattoli–Sidermec	+ 0"
6	(Australia) Alex Edmondson	Team BikeExchange	+ 0"
7	(Poland) Alan Banaszek	HRE Mazowsze Serce Polski	+ 0"
8	(New Zealand) Ryan Christensen	Canyon dhb SunGod	+ 0"
9	(United Kingdom) Matthew Bostock	Canyon dhb SunGod	+ 0"
10	(Spain) Mikel Alonso	Euskaltel–Euskadi	+ 0"
General classification after the stage
1	(Germany) Phil Bauhaus	Team Bahrain Victorious	3h 33' 35"
2	(Spain) Jon Aberasturi	Caja Rural–Seguros RGA	+ 4"
3	(Portugal) Rui Oliveira	UAE Team Emirates	+ 6"
4	(Norway) Daniel Hoelgaard	Uno-X Pro Cycling Team	+ 7"
5	(Norway) Jonas Iversby Hvideberg	Uno-X Pro Cycling Team	+ 7"
6	(United Kingdom) Matthew Bostock	Canyon dhb SunGod	+ 8"
7	(Italy) Diego Ulissi	UAE Team Emirates	+ 9"
8	(Poland) Stanisław Aniołkowski	Bingoal Pauwels Sauces WB	+ 10"
9	(Italy) Matteo Malucelli	Androni Giocattoli–Sidermec	+ 10"
10	(Australia) Alex Edmondson	Team BikeExchange	+ 10"

=== Stage 2 ===
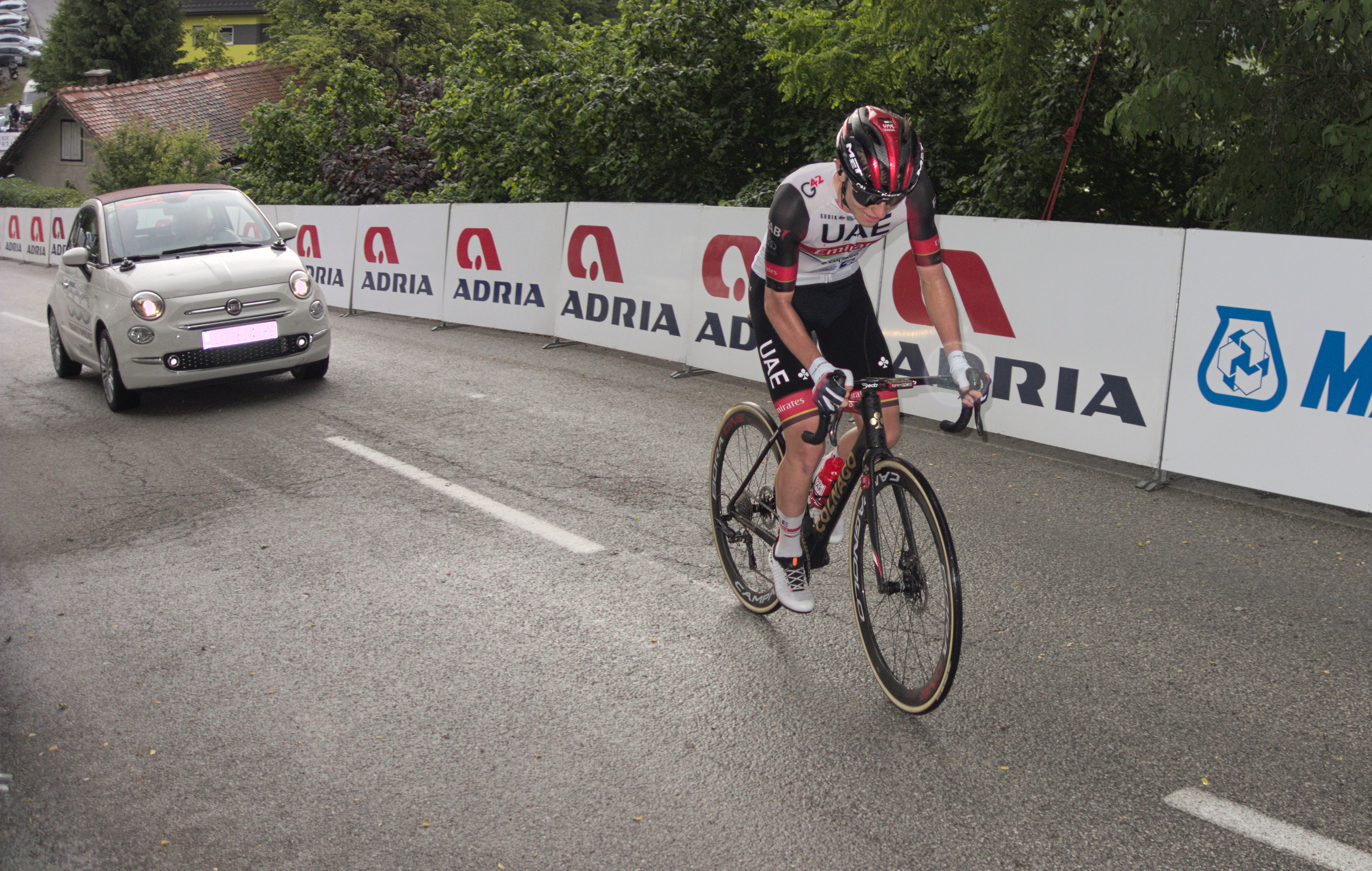
Tadej Pogačar climbing to Celje Castle on the way to winning Stage 2

10 June 2021 – Žalec to Celje, 147 km (91 mi)

Rank	Rider	Team	Time
Official results
1	(Slovenia) Tadej Pogačar	UAE Team Emirates	3h 32' 03"
2	(Slovenia) Matej Mohorič	Team Bahrain Victorious	+ 1' 22"
3	(Italy) Diego Ulissi	UAE Team Emirates	+ 1' 22"
4	(Italy) Matteo Sobrero	Astana–Premier Tech	+ 1' 22"
5	(Estonia) Tanel Kangert	Team BikeExchange	+ 1' 25"
6	(United Kingdom) James Shaw	Ribble Weldtite	+ 1' 25"
7	(Poland) Rafał Majka	UAE Team Emirates	+ 1' 25"
8	(Italy) Giovanni Carboni	Bardiani–CSF–Faizanè	+ 1' 25"
9	(Spain) Jonathan Lastra	Caja Rural–Seguros RGA	+ 1' 25"
10	(Slovenia) Jan Polanc	UAE Team Emirates	+ 1' 30"
General classification after the stage
1	(Slovenia) Tadej Pogačar	UAE Team Emirates	7h 05' 37"
2	(Slovenia) Matej Mohorič	Team Bahrain Victorious	+ 1' 25"
3	(Italy) Diego Ulissi	UAE Team Emirates	+ 1' 28"
4	(Italy) Matteo Sobrero	Astana–Premier Tech	+ 1' 33"
5	(Italy) Giovanni Carboni	Bardiani–CSF–Faizanè	+ 1' 36"
6	(Spain) Jonathan Lastra	Caja Rural–Seguros RGA	+ 1' 36"
7	(United Kingdom) James Shaw	Ribble Weldtite	+ 1' 36"
8	(Poland) Rafał Majka	UAE Team Emirates	+ 1' 36"
9	(Estonia) Tanel Kangert	Team BikeExchange	+ 1' 36"
10	(Slovenia) Jan Polanc	UAE Team Emirates	+ 1' 41"

=== Stage 3 ===
11 June 2021 – Brežice to Krško, 165.8 km (103.0 mi)

Stage 3

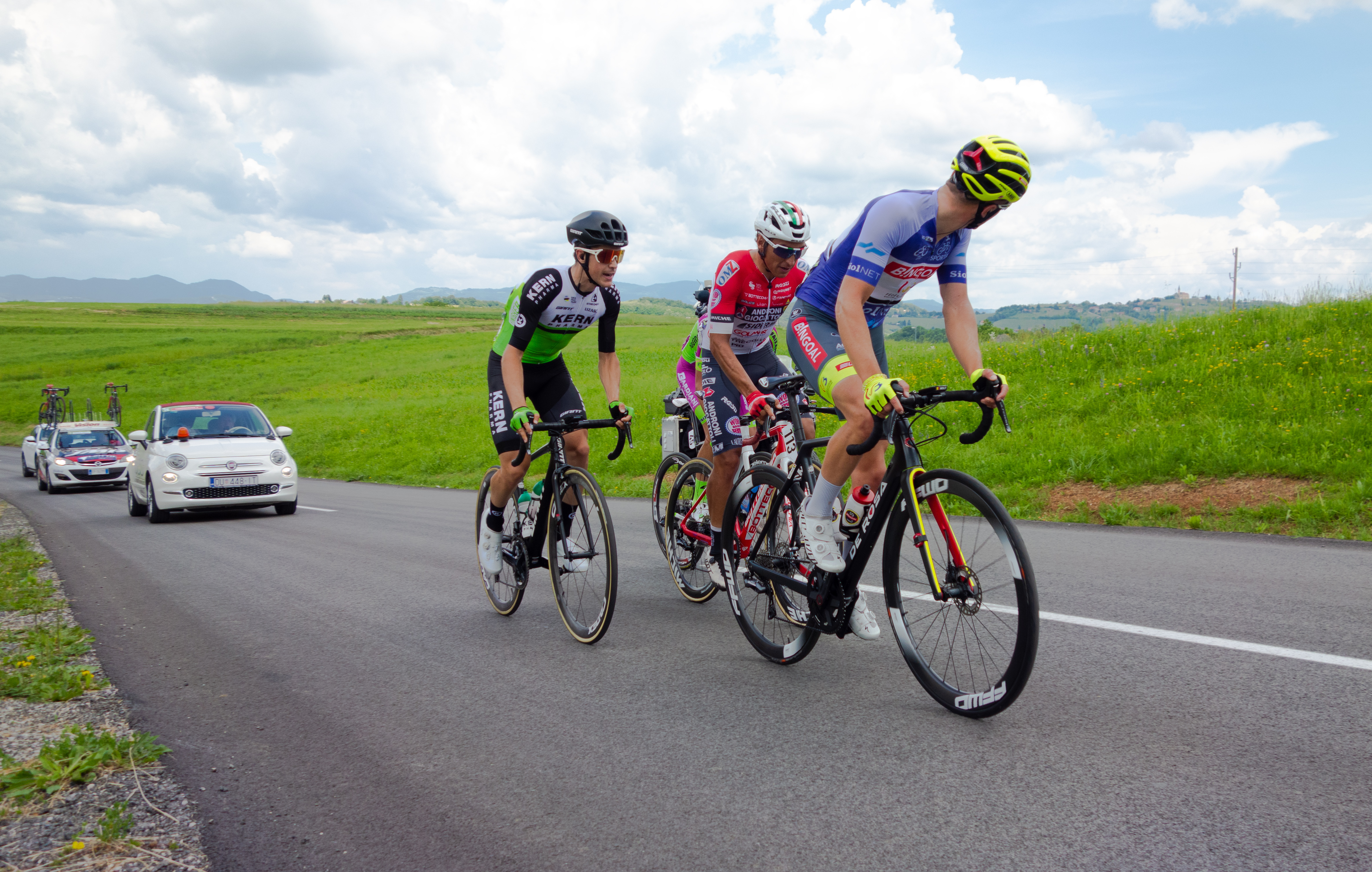
The main breakaway group on Stage 3. From right to left: Kenny Molly (Bingoal Pauwels Sauces WB), Jhonatan Restrepo (Androni Giocattoli–Sidermec), Alessandro Monaco (Bardiani–CSF–Faizanè; behind Restrepo), and Sergio Araiz (Equipo Kern Pharma)

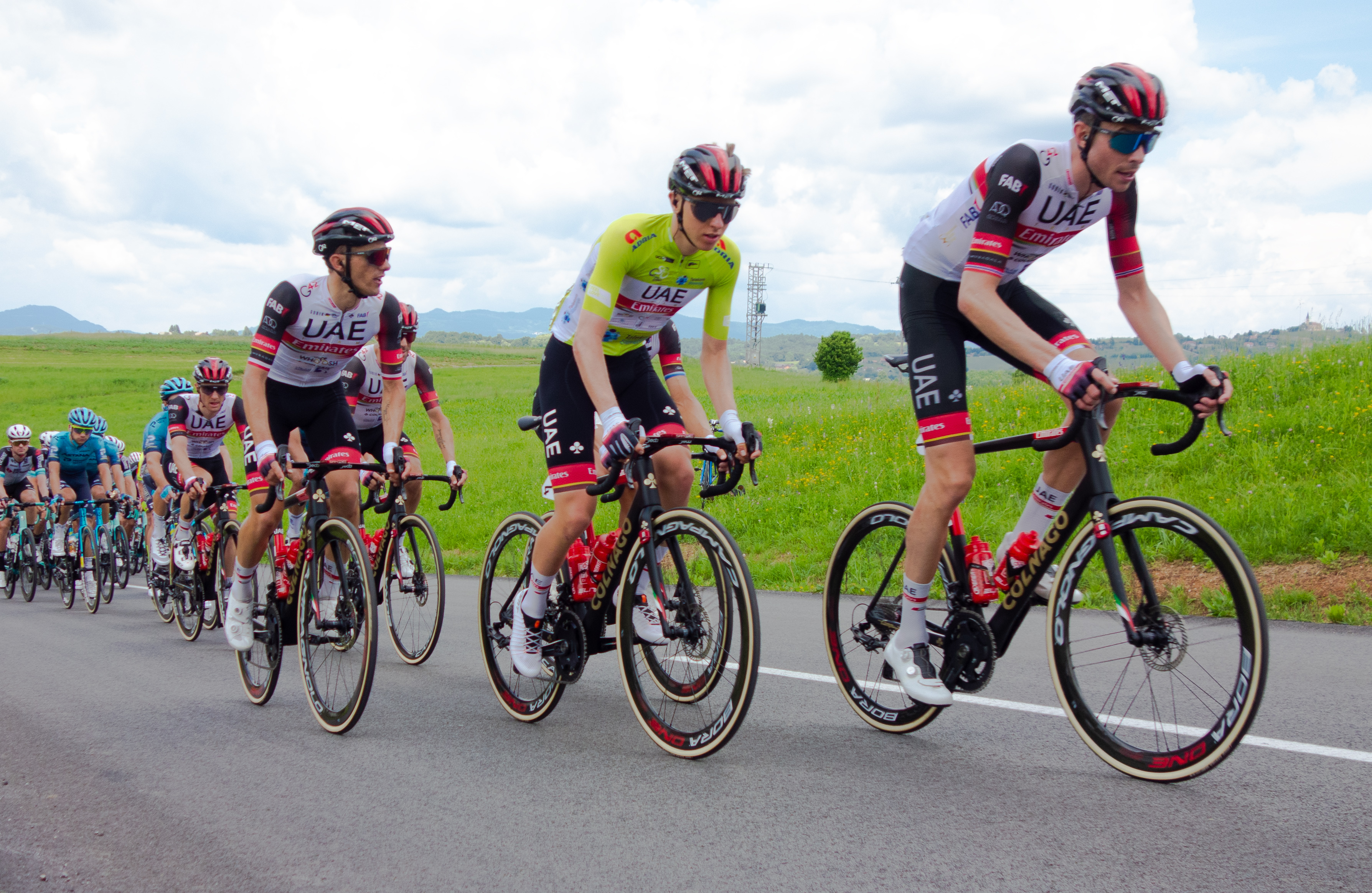
Race leader Tadej Pogačar (green jersey) and UAE Team Emirates lead the peloton at Raka on Stage 3

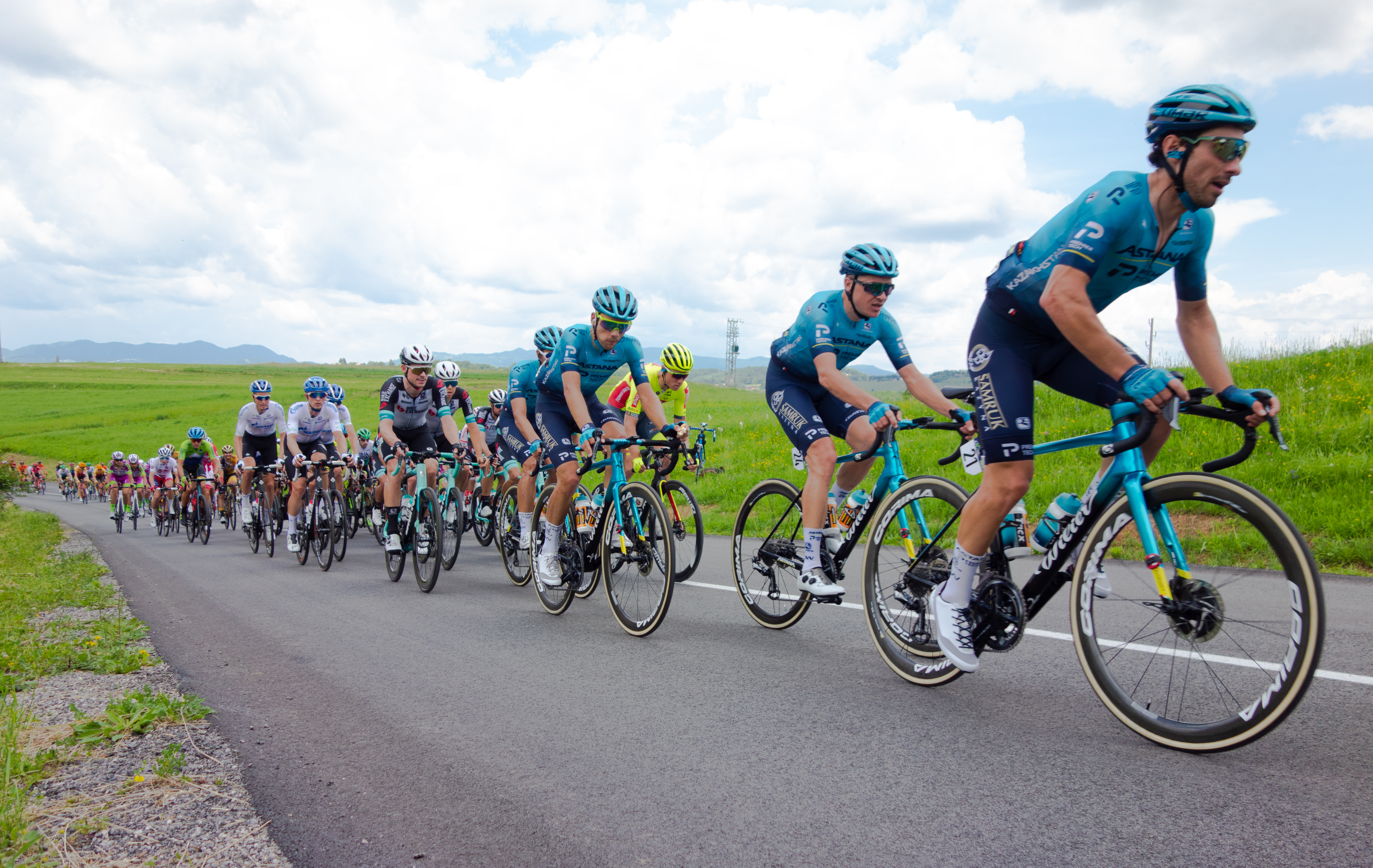
Astana–Premier Tech on Stage 3

Rank	Rider	Team	Time
Official results
1	(Spain) Jon Aberasturi	Caja Rural–Seguros RGA	3h 50' 26"
2	(Slovenia) Matej Mohorič	Team Bahrain Victorious	+ 0"
3	(Italy) Matteo Trentin	UAE Team Emirates	+ 0"
4	(Belgium) Rémy Mertz	Bingoal Pauwels Sauces WB	+ 0"
5	(Denmark) Jeppe Pallesen	Team ColoQuick	+ 0"
6	(United Kingdom) James Shaw	Ribble Weldtite	+ 0"
7	(Colombia) Daniel Muñoz	Androni Giocattoli–Sidermec	+ 0"
8	(Italy) Giovanni Carboni	Bardiani–CSF–Faizanè	+ 0"
9	(Russia) Dmitry Strakhov	Gazprom–RusVelo	+ 0"
10	(Spain) Javier Romo	Astana–Premier Tech	+ 0"
General classification after the stage
1	(Slovenia) Tadej Pogačar	UAE Team Emirates	10h 56' 03"
2	(Slovenia) Matej Mohorič	Team Bahrain Victorious	+ 1' 15"
3	(Italy) Diego Ulissi	UAE Team Emirates	+ 1' 26"
4	(Italy) Matteo Sobrero	Astana–Premier Tech	+ 1' 33"
5	(United Kingdom) James Shaw	Ribble Weldtite	+ 1' 36"
6	(Italy) Giovanni Carboni	Bardiani–CSF–Faizanè	+ 1' 36"
7	(Spain) Jonathan Lastra	Caja Rural–Seguros RGA	+ 1' 36"
8	(Poland) Rafał Majka	UAE Team Emirates	+ 1' 36"
9	(Estonia) Tanel Kangert	Team BikeExchange	+ 1' 36"
10	(Slovenia) Jan Polanc	UAE Team Emirates	+ 1' 41"

=== Stage 4 ===
12 June 2021 – Ajdovščina to Nova Gorica, 164.1 km (102.0 mi)

Stage 5

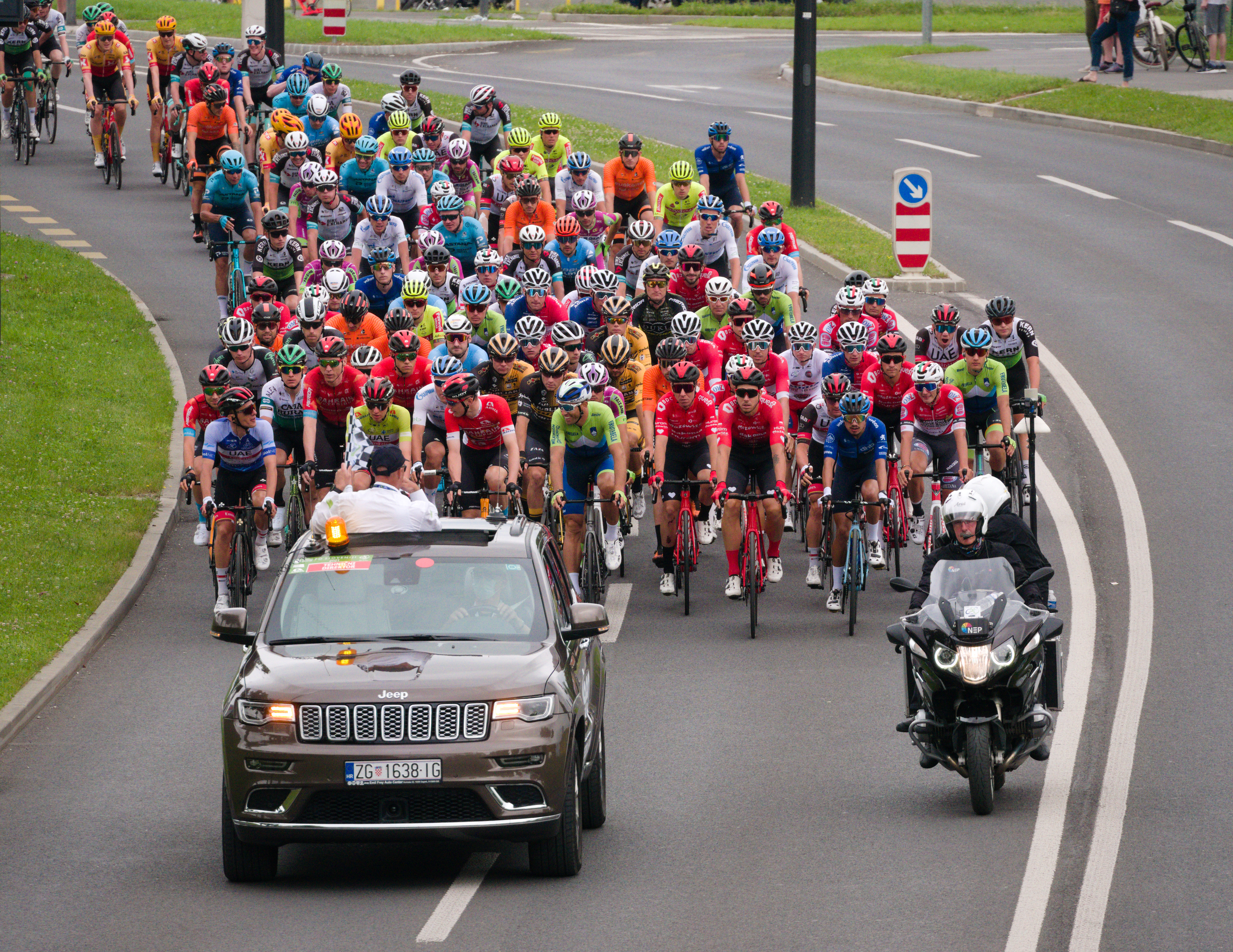
Start of Stage 5 in Ljubljana

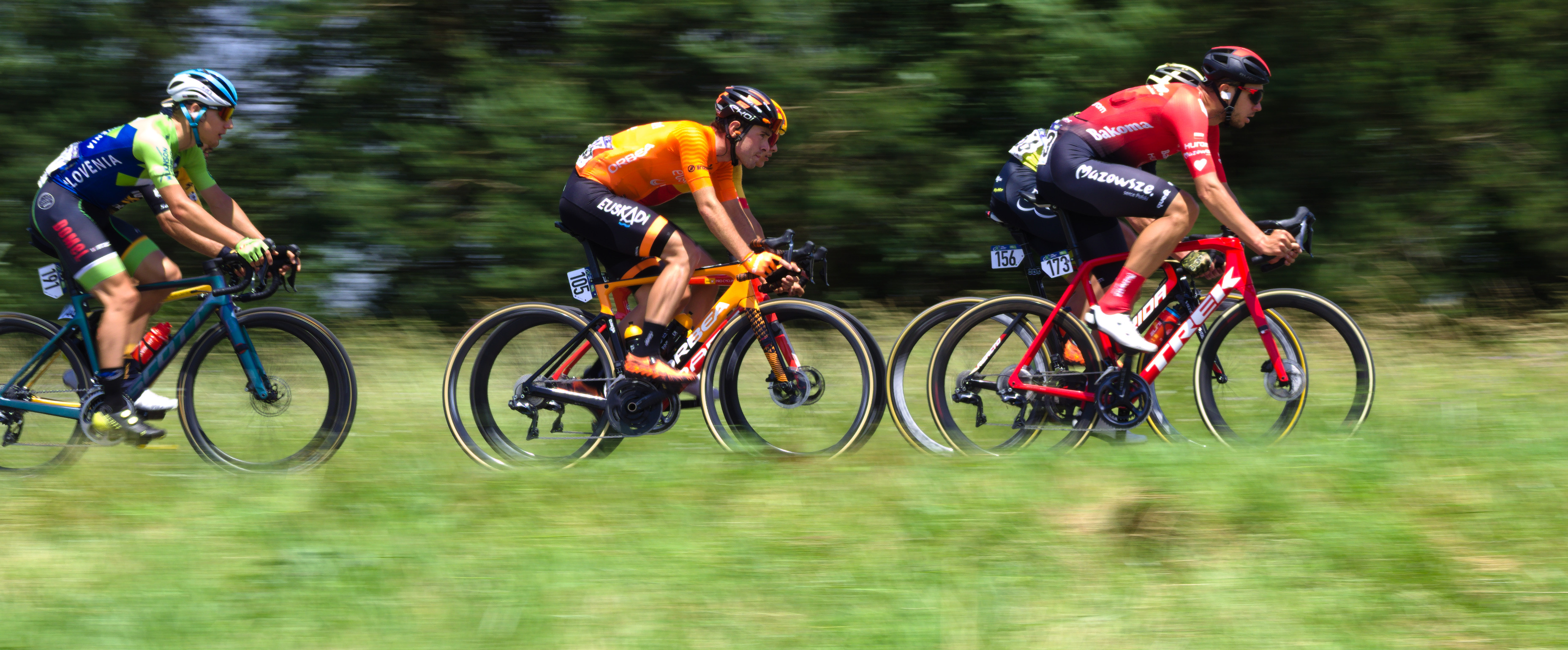
Stage 5's main breakaway at 93 kilometres (58 mi) in Ljubljana-Sostro. Pictured, from right to left: Paweł Bernas (HRE Mazowsze Serce Polski, Patrik Tybor (Dukla Banská Bystrica; behind Bernas), Julen Irizar (Euskaltel–Euskadi), Torstein Træen (Uno-X Pro Cycling Team; behind Irizar), Martin Lavrič (Slovenia), and Viktor Potočki (Ljubljana Gusto Santic; behind Lavrič). The last member of the breakaway, Jeppe Pallesen (Team ColoQuick), was to the left of the photo.

Rank	Rider	Team	Time
Official results
1	(Italy) Diego Ulissi	UAE Team Emirates	4h 15' 28"
2	(Slovenia) Tadej Pogačar	UAE Team Emirates	+ 1"
3	(Italy) Matteo Sobrero	Astana–Premier Tech	+ 1"
4	(Poland) Rafał Majka	UAE Team Emirates	+ 27"
5	(United Kingdom) James Shaw	Ribble Weldtite	+ 48"
6	(Estonia) Tanel Kangert	Team BikeExchange	+ 53"
7	(Italy) Giovanni Carboni	Bardiani–CSF–Faizanè	+ 1' 05"
8	(Slovenia) Matej Mohorič	Team Bahrain Victorious	+ 1' 19"
9	(Spain) Javier Romo	Astana–Premier Tech	+ 1' 28"
10	(Slovenia) Jan Polanc	UAE Team Emirates	+ 1' 35"
General classification after the stage
1	(Slovenia) Tadej Pogačar	UAE Team Emirates	15h 11' 26"
2	(Italy) Diego Ulissi	UAE Team Emirates	+ 1' 21"
3	(Italy) Matteo Sobrero	Astana–Premier Tech	+ 1' 35"
4	(Poland) Rafał Majka	UAE Team Emirates	+ 2' 08"
5	(United Kingdom) James Shaw	Ribble Weldtite	+ 2' 29"
6	(Estonia) Tanel Kangert	Team BikeExchange	+ 2' 34"
7	(Slovenia) Matej Mohorič	Team Bahrain Victorious	+ 2' 39"
8	(Italy) Giovanni Carboni	Bardiani–CSF–Faizanè	+ 2' 46"
9	(Slovenia) Jan Polanc	UAE Team Emirates	+ 3' 21"
10	(Spain) Jonathan Lastra	Caja Rural–Seguros RGA	+ 4' 45"

=== Stage 5 ===
13 June 2021 – Ljubljana to Novo mesto, 175.3 km (108.9 mi)

Rank	Rider	Team	Time
Official results
1	(Germany) Phil Bauhaus	Team Bahrain Victorious	4h 12' 05"
2	(Australia) Alex Edmondson	Team BikeExchange	+ 0"
3	(Australia) Heinrich Haussler	Team Bahrain Victorious	+ 0"
4	(Italy) Matteo Trentin	UAE Team Emirates	+ 0"
5	(Spain) Jon Aberasturi	Caja Rural–Seguros RGA	+ 0"
6	(Spain) Enrique Sanz	Equipo Kern Pharma	+ 0"
7	(United Kingdom) Matthew Gibson	Ribble Weldtite	+ 0"
8	(Portugal) Rui Oliveira	UAE Team Emirates	+ 0"
9	(Poland) Alan Banaszek	HRE Mazowsze Serce Polski	+ 0"
10	(Italy) Matteo Sobrero	Astana–Premier Tech	+ 0"

== Classification leadership ==
Classification leadership by stage
Stage	Winner	General classification	Points classification	Mountains classification	Young rider classification	Team classification
1	Phil Bauhaus	Phil Bauhaus	Phil Bauhaus	Mathijs Paasschens	Jonas Iversby Hvideberg	Team Bahrain Victorious
2	Tadej Pogačar	Tadej Pogačar	Phil Bauhaus	Tadej Pogačar	Kristjan Hočevar	UAE Team Emirates
3	Jon Aberasturi	Tadej Pogačar	Matej Mohorič	Kenny Molly	Kristjan Hočevar	UAE Team Emirates
4	Diego Ulissi	Tadej Pogačar	Matej Mohorič	Tadej Pogačar	Kristjan Hočevar	UAE Team Emirates
5	Phil Bauhaus	Tadej Pogačar	Matej Mohorič	Tadej Pogačar	Kristjan Hočevar	UAE Team Emirates
Final		Tadej Pogačar	Matej Mohorič	Tadej Pogačar	Kristjan Hočevar	UAE Team Emirates

- On stage 2, Jon Aberasturi, who was second in the points classification, wore the red jersey, because first placed Phil Bauhaus wore the green jersey as the leader of the general classification.
- On stage 3, Kenny Molly, who was second in the mountains classification, wore the blue jersey, because first placed Tadej Pogačar wore the green jersey as the leader of the general classification. For the same reason, Rafał Majka wore the blue jersey on stage 5.

== Final classification standings ==
Legend
Denotes the winner of the general classification	Denotes the winner of the mountains classification
Denotes the winner of the points classification	Denotes the winner of the young rider classification

=== General classification ===
Cycling fans at the Stage 3 finish line in Krško

Stage 5 starting in BTC City, Ljubljana

Rank	Rider	Team	Time
1	(Slovenia) Tadej Pogačar	UAE Team Emirates	19h 23' 31"
2	(Italy) Diego Ulissi	UAE Team Emirates	+ 1' 21"
3	(Italy) Matteo Sobrero	Astana–Premier Tech	+ 1' 35"
4	(Poland) Rafał Majka	UAE Team Emirates	+ 2' 08"
5	(United Kingdom) James Shaw	Ribble Weldtite	+ 2' 29"
6	(Estonia) Tanel Kangert	Team BikeExchange	+ 2' 34"
7	(Slovenia) Matej Mohorič	Team Bahrain Victorious	+ 2' 39"
8	(Italy) Giovanni Carboni	Bardiani–CSF–Faizanè	+ 2' 46"
9	(Slovenia) Jan Polanc	UAE Team Emirates	+ 3' 21"
10	(Spain) Jonathan Lastra	Caja Rural–Seguros RGA	+ 4' 45"

=== Points classification ===
Rank	Rider	Team	Points
1	(Slovenia) Matej Mohorič	Team Bahrain Victorious	58
2	(Spain) Jon Aberasturi	Caja Rural–Seguros RGA	57
3	(Germany) Phil Bauhaus	Team Bahrain Victorious	53
4	(Slovenia) Tadej Pogačar	UAE Team Emirates	46
5	(Italy) Diego Ulissi	UAE Team Emirates	45
6	(Italy) Matteo Sobrero	Astana–Premier Tech	37
7	(United Kingdom) James Shaw	Ribble Weldtite	32
8	(Australia) Alex Edmondson	Team BikeExchange	30
9	(Italy) Matteo Trentin	UAE Team Emirates	30
10	(Italy) Giovanni Carboni	Bardiani–CSF–Faizanè	25

=== Mountains classification ===
Rank	Rider	Team	Points
1	(Slovenia) Tadej Pogačar	UAE Team Emirates	16
2	(Poland) Rafał Majka	UAE Team Emirates	13
3	(Italy) Diego Ulissi	UAE Team Emirates	12
4	(Poland) Adam Stachowiak	HRE Mazowsze Serce Polski	11
5	(Italy) Matteo Sobrero	Astana–Premier Tech	10
6	(Belgium) Kenny Molly	Bingoal Pauwels Sauces WB	9
7	(United Kingdom) Robert Scott	Canyon dhb SunGod	7
8	(Slovenia) Jan Polanc	UAE Team Emirates	6
9	(United Kingdom) Jacob Scott	Canyon dhb SunGod	5
10	(Croatia) Josip Rumac	Androni Giocattoli–Sidermec	5

=== Young rider classification ===
Rank	Rider	Team	Time
1	(Slovenia) Kristjan Hočevar	Adria Mobil	19h 30' 35"
2	(Spain) Javier Romo	Astana–Premier Tech	+ 2' 34"
3	(Spain) Raúl García Pierna	Equipo Kern Pharma	+ 8' 13"
4	(Netherlands) Danny van der Tuuk	Equipo Kern Pharma	+ 8' 16"
5	(Slovenia) Gal Glivar	Adria Mobil	+ 11' 19"
6	(Slovenia) Anže Skok	Ljubljana Gusto Santic	+ 16' 34"
7	(Denmark) William Levy	Team ColoQuick	+ 17' 26"
8	(Belgium) Tom Paquot	Bingoal Pauwels Sauces WB	+ 21' 40"
9	(United Kingdom) Thomas Mein	Canyon dhb SunGod	+ 21' 44"
10	(Norway) Jonas Iversby Hvideberg	Uno-X Pro Cycling Team	+ 28' 07"

=== Team classification ===
Rank	Team	Time
1	(United Arab Emirates) UAE Team Emirates	58h 14' 36"
2	(Russia) Gazprom–RusVelo	+ 15' 26"
3	(Kazakhstan) Astana–Premier Tech	+ 15' 34"
4	(Australia) Team BikeExchange	+ 17' 06"
5	(Italy) Bardiani–CSF–Faizanè	+ 18' 03"
6	(Italy) Androni Giocattoli–Sidermec	+ 19' 21"
7	(Spain) Equipo Kern Pharma	+ 27' 27"
8	Slovenia	+ 33' 45"
9	(Spain) Caja Rural–Seguros RGA	+ 34' 48"
10	Team Bahrain Victorious	+ 34' 54"

== UCI point ranking ==
Position	1.	2.	3.	4.	5.	6.	7.	8.	9.	10.	11.	12.	13.	14.	15.	16.-30.	31.-40.
General classification	200	150	125	100	85	70	60	50	40	35	30	25	20	15	10	5	3
Per stage	20	10	5
Leader	5

Classification
Position	Rider	Team	General	Stage	Leader	Total
1.	(Slovenia) Tadej Pogačar	UAE Team Emirates	200	30	15	245
2.	(Italy) Diego Ulissi	UAE Team Emirates	150	25	-	175
3.	(Italy) Matteo Sobrero	Astana–Premier Tech	125	5	-	130
4.	(Poland) Rafał Majka	UAE Team Emirates	100	-	-	100
5.	(United Kingdom) James Shaw	Ribble Weldtite	85	-	-	85
6.	(Slovenia) Matej Mohorič	Team Bahrain Victorious	60	20	-	80
7.	(Estonia) Tanel Kangert	Team BikeExchange	70	-	-	70
8.	(Italy) Giovanni Carboni	Bardiani–CSF–Faizanè	50	-	-	50
9.	(Germany) Phil Bauhaus	Team Bahrain Victorious	-	40	5	45
10.	(Slovenia) Jan Polanc	UAE Team Emirates	40	-	-	40
