= Ander Barrenetxea =

Ander Barrenetxea may refer to:

- Ander Barrenetxea (cyclist) (born 1992), Spanish cyclist
- Ander Barrenetxea (footballer) (born 2001), Spanish footballer
