= Daniel Viejo =

Spanish cyclist

Personal information
- Full name: José Daniel Viejo Redondo
- Nickname: Dani
- Born: 8 December 1997 (age 28) Oviedo, Spain
- Height: 1.79 m (5 ft 10 in)
- Weight: 75 kg (165 lb)

Cycling career
- Sport: Cycling
- Discipline: Road
- Role: Rider

Amateur teams
- 2016: Gomur–Cantabria Deporte–Ferroatlántica
- 2018: Caja Rural–Seguros RGA Amateur

Professional teams
- 2017: Unieuro Trevigiani–Hemus 1896
- 2019: Euskadi–Murias

José Daniel Viejo Redondo (born 8 December 1997) is a Spanish cyclist, who last rode for UCI Professional Continental team Euskadi–Murias.

== Major results ==
2017
4th GP Izola
10th Circuito del Porto
