= Juan Antonio López-Cózar =

Spanish cyclist

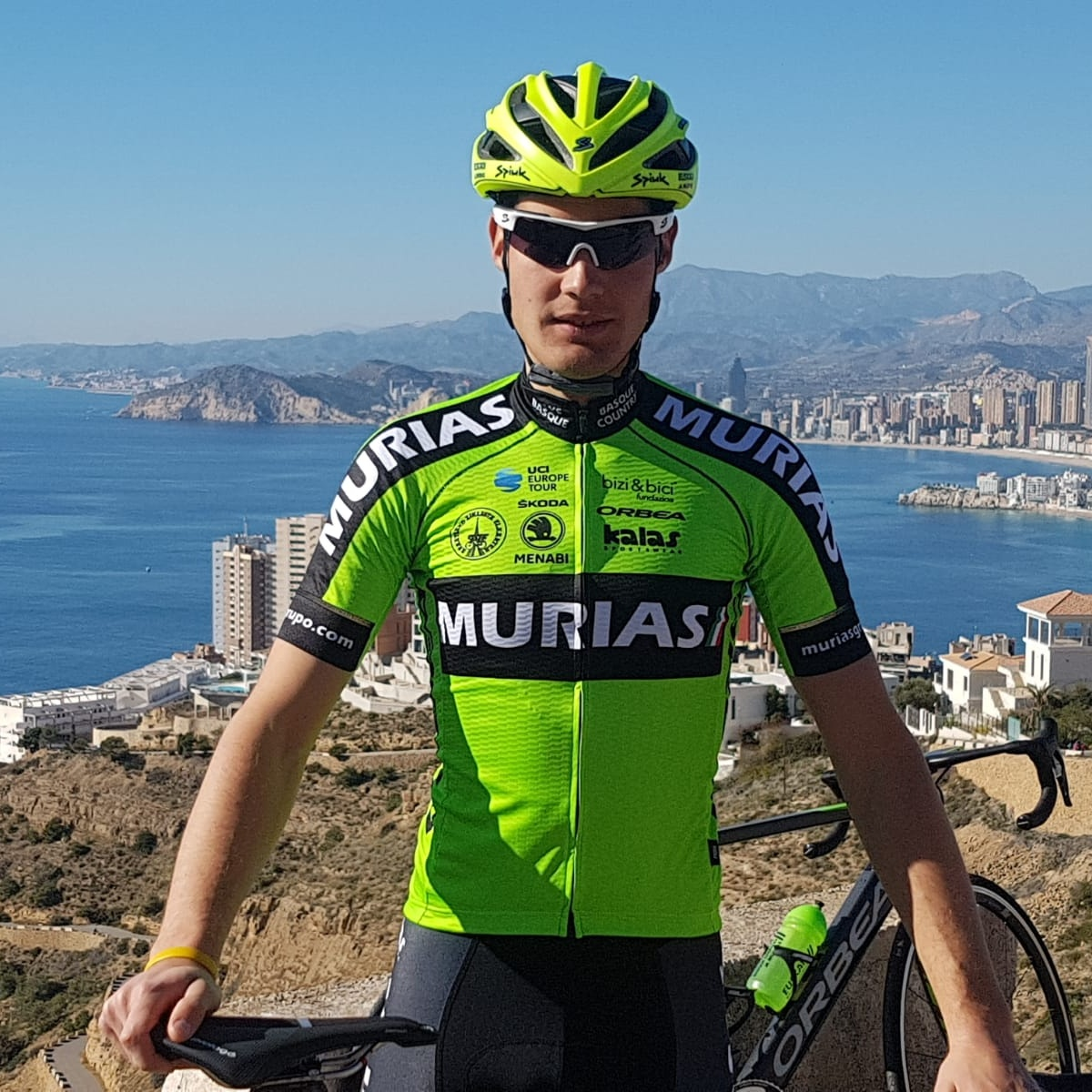
- López-Cózar in 2019

Personal information
- Full name: Juan Antonio López-Cózar Jáimez
- Nickname: Chupe
- Born: 20 August 1994 (age 32) Loja, Granada, Spain
- Height: 1.75 m (5 ft 9 in)
- Weight: 70 kg (154 lb)

Cycling career
- Sport: Cycling
- Current team: Retired
- Discipline: Road
- Role: Rider

Amateur teams
- 2013: Cajamar–Cosentino
- 2014: Specialized–Fundación Alberto Contador
- 2015–2016: Café Baqué–Conservas Campos
- 2017: Fundación Euskadi–EDP
- 2020: Manuela Fundación Bike Team

Professional teams
- 2018: Fundación Euskadi
- 2019: Euskadi–Murias
- 2021–2022: Burgos BH

Juan Antonio López-Cózar Jáimez (born 20 August 1994) is a Spanish former cyclist, who competed as a professional from 2018 to 2022.

== Major results ==
2018
6th Prueba Villafranca-Ordiziako Klasika
9th Overall Grande Prémio de Portugal N2
2019
3rd Prueba Villafranca de Ordizia
