= Mario González (cyclist) =

Spanish bicycle racer

Personal information
- Full name: Mario González Salas
- Born: 6 June 1992 (age 34) Torrelavega, Spain
- Height: 1.82 m (6 ft 0 in)
- Weight: 65 kg (143 lb)

Cycling career
- Sport: Cycling
- Discipline: Road
- Role: Rider

Amateur teams
- 2011: Cueva El Soplao
- 2012: Gomur–Cantabria Deporte–Ferroatlántica
- 2013: Cafés Baqué–Conservas Campos

Professional teams
- 2014–2015: ActiveJet
- 2016–2018: Sporting / Tavira
- 2019: Euskadi–Murias

Mario González Salas (born 6 June 1992) is a Spanish cyclist, who last rode for UCI Professional Continental team Euskadi–Murias.

== Career ==
He won the third and final stage of the 2018 Volta Internacional Cova da Beira. The stage was shortened due to weather conditions. He also won the mountain classification for the event.

== Major results ==
2010
1st Time trial, National Junior Road Championships
9th Time trial, UCI Juniors Road World Championships
2011
1st Time trial, National Under-23 Road Championships
2013
National Under-23 Road Championships

1st Road race
3rd Time trial

2015
8th Korona Kocich Gór
10th Overall Volta ao Alentejo
2017
10th Clássica da Arrábida
2018
Volta Internacional Cova da Beira

1st Mountains classification
1st Stage 3

2nd Overall GP Nacional 2 de Portugal
Mediterranean Games

5th Road race
7th Time trial

6th Overall Vuelta a Castilla y León
2019
8th Overall Volta ao Alentejo
9th Klasika Primavera
