= GP Nacional 2 de Portugal =

Grande Prémio de Portugal Nacional 2
Race details
- Date: July
- English name: Grand Prix of Portugal Nacional 2
- Local name(s): Grande Prémio de Portugal Nacional 2 (in Portuguese)
- Nickname(s): GP Nacional 2 de Portugal
- Discipline: Road race
- Competition: UCI Europe Tour
- Type: Stage race
- Organiser: GlobalSport
- Race director: Paulo Costa; Cândido Barbosa
- Web site: www.gppn2.pt

History
- First edition: 2018
- Editions: 1
- First winner: Raúl Alarcón (ESP)
- Most wins: No repeat winners
- Most recent: Raúl Alarcón (ESP)

The GP Nacional 2 de Portugal (Portuguese: Grande Prémio de Portugal Nacional 2) is a road bicycle racing stage race held along the longest road of Portugal, the N2, which started in July 2018. It is promoted by GlobalSport and is rated as a 2.2 event as part of the UCI Europe Tour.

The idea for the race arose as a legacy event following the creation, in late 2016, of Associação de Municípios da Rota da Estrada Nacional 2, a trans-regional project created by twenty-one municipalities along its route, connecting the cities of Chaves and Faro. It aimed to promote Portugal's inland crossed by the road for its importance to tourism.

== Route ==
The route of GP Nacional 2 de Portugal connects Portugal north to south, "cutting" the country halfway between west and east and crossing eleven of the eighteen districts, eight provinces, four mountains, eleven rivers and thirty-five municipalities.

Due to Portugal's geography, the early stages are hilly to mountainous before moving further south towards the Beira Baixa region, which are the decisive portions of the race. The latter, southern part of GP Nacional 2 de Portugal is usually flat and better suited for sprinters.

== Jersey colours ==
The leader of the overall general classification receives a yellow jersey (sponsor Rota Estrada Nacional 2). There are also four other classifications, as in the Volta a Portugal the points classification leader's jersey is green (sponsor Instituto Português do Desporto e da Juventude) and the mountains classification jersey is blue (sponsor Turismo de Portugal). The sprints classification jersey is white (sponsor Turismo do Porto e Norte Portugal) and the best young rider's jersey is orange (sponsor Turismo Centro de Portugal).

== Winners ==
Year	Country	Rider	Team
2018	Spain	Raúl Alarcón	W52 / FC Porto

=== Wins per country ===
Wins	Country
1	Spain
