= Julen Irizar =

Spanish cyclist

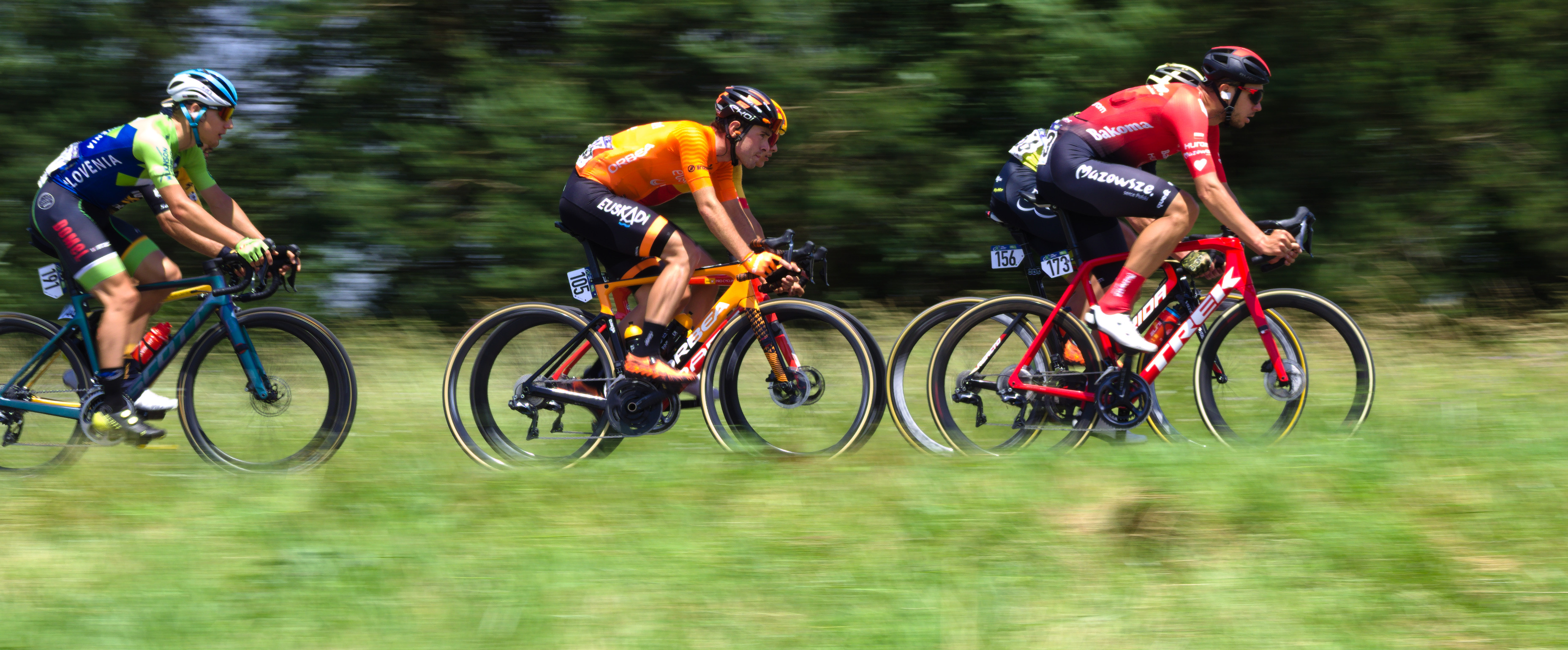
- Irizar (middle) on 2021 Tour of Slovenia

Personal information
- Full name: Julen Irizar Laskurain
- Born: 26 March 1995 (age 31) Bergara, Spain
- Height: 1.78 m (5 ft 10 in)
- Weight: 67 kg (148 lb)

Cycling career
- Sport: Cycling
- Current team: Retired
- Discipline: Road
- Role: Rider

Amateur teams
- 2014: Debabarrena
- 2015–2016: Ampo–Goierriko TB
- 2016: Euskadi Basque Country–Murias (stagiaire)

Professional teams
- 2017–2019: Euskadi Basque Country–Murias
- 2020–2022: Fundación–Orbea

Julen Irizar Laskurain (born 26 March 1995) is a Spanish cyclist, who competed as a professional from 2017 to 2022.

== Major results ==
2018
1st Stage 2 Grande Prémio de Portugal N2
