= Ander Barrenetxea (cyclist) =

Spanish bicycle racer

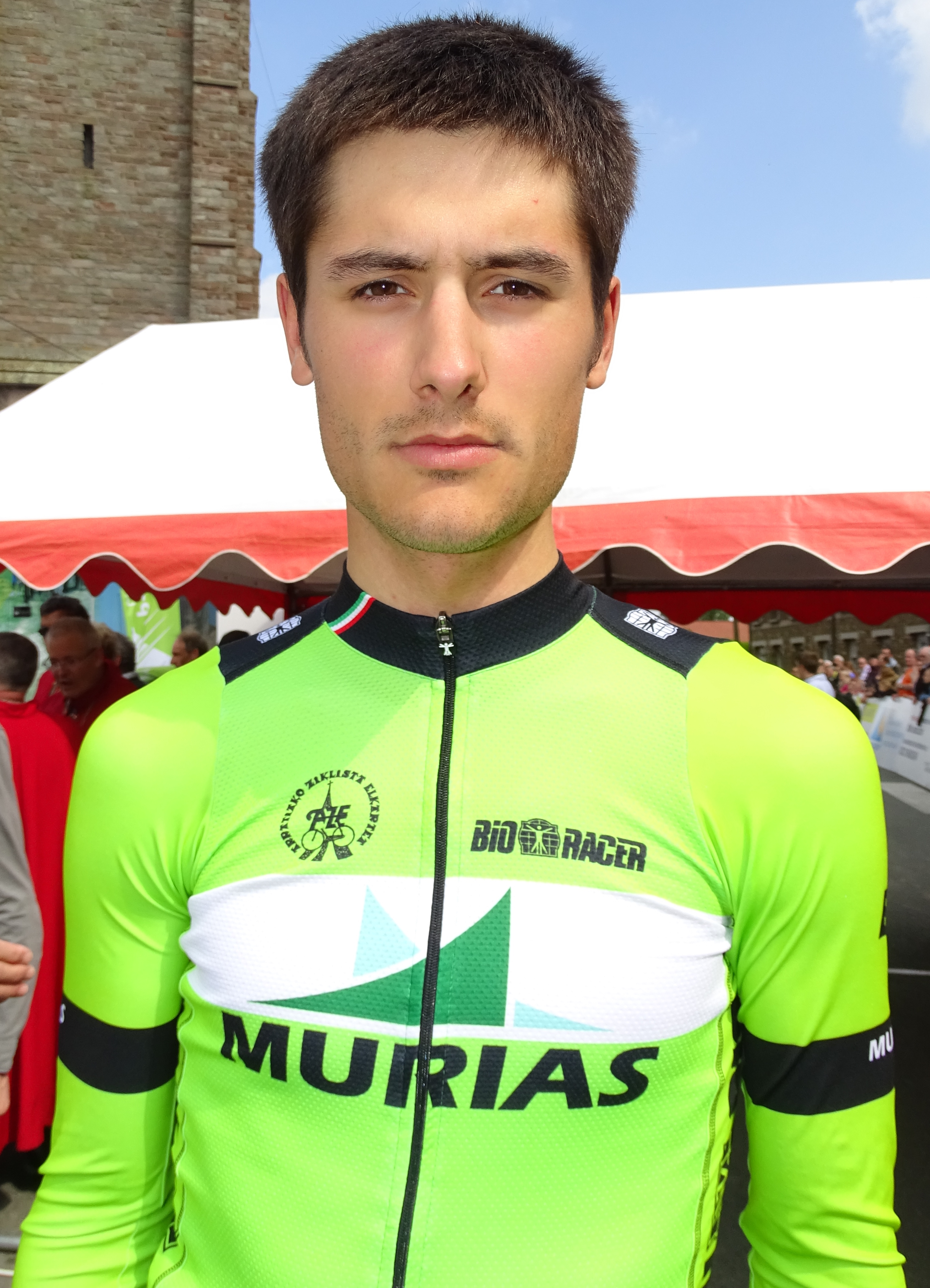
- Barrenetxea in 2015.

Personal information
- Full name: Ander Barrenetxea Uriarte
- Born: 29 March 1992 (age 34) Galdakao, Spain
- Height: 1.86 m (6 ft 1 in)
- Weight: 71 kg (157 lb)

Cycling career
- Sport: Cycling
- Current team: Retired
- Discipline: Road
- Role: Rider

Amateur team
- 2013–2014: Ibaigane–Opel

Professional team
- 2015–2019: Murias Taldea

Ander Barrenetxea Uriarte (born 29 March 1992 in Galdakao) is a Spanish former cyclist, who competed as a professional from 2015 to 2019 for UCI Professional Continental team Euskadi–Murias.
