= Euskadi–Murias =

Spanish cycling team

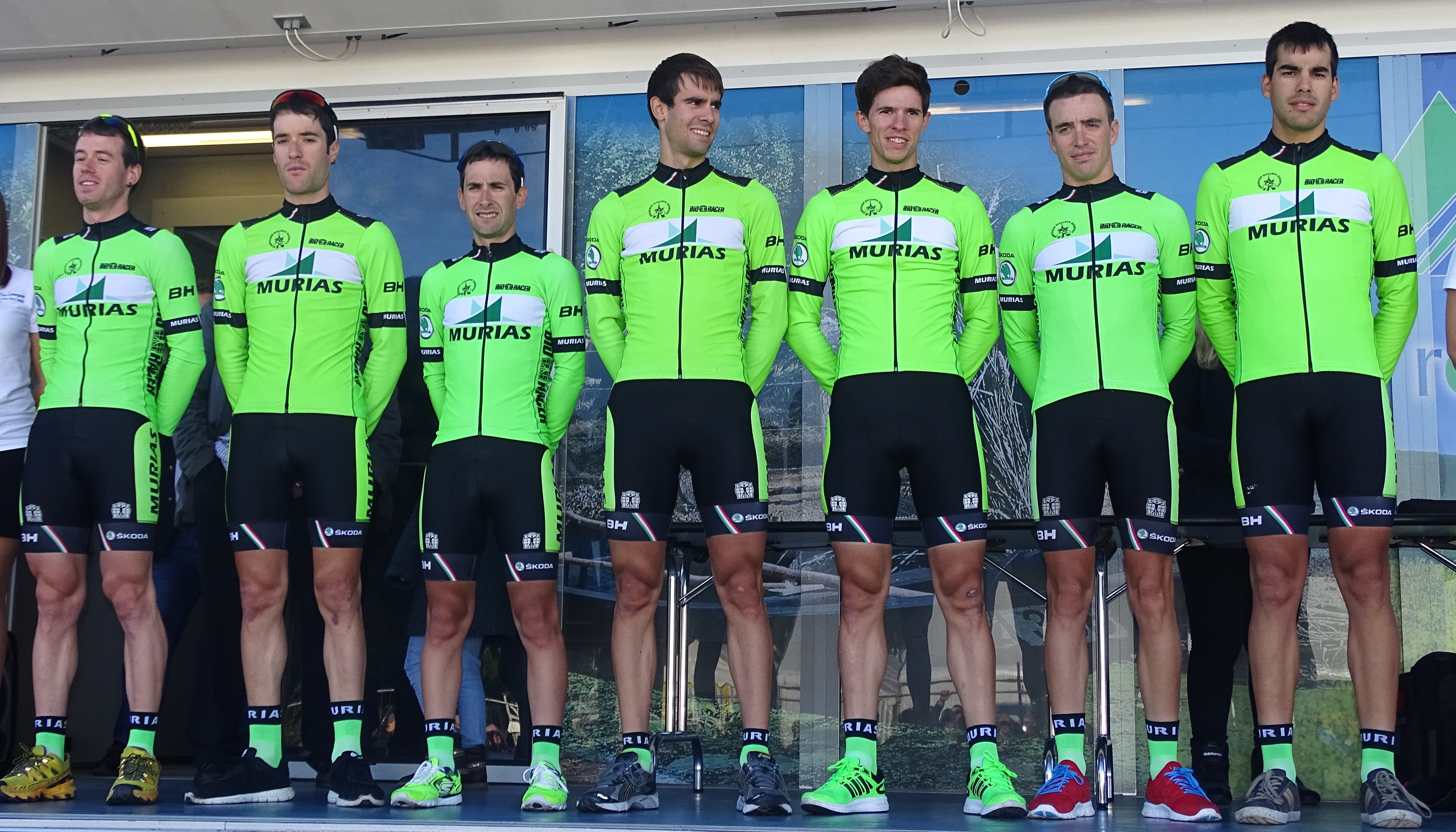

Team information
- UCI code: EUS
- Registered: Spain
- Founded: 2015
- Disbanded: 2019
- Discipline: Road
- Status: UCI Professional Continental

Key personnel
- General manager: Jon Odriozola
- Team manager: Rubén Pérez

Team name history
- 2015 2016–2017 2018–2019: Murias Taldea; Euskadi Basque Country–Murias; Euskadi–Murias

Euskadi–Murias was a Spanish UCI Professional Continental cycling team, that competed between 2015 and 2019. It was initially UCI Continental status, but upgraded to Pro Continental in 2018. Its sponsor was the Basque construction company Murias Group.

The team aimed to be the successor to Euskaltel–Euskadi as the leading professional team in Basque cycling.

== Final team roster ==
As of 15 January 2019.

| Rider | Date of birth |
|---|---|
| Mikel Aristi (ESP) | 28 May 1993 (age 33) |
| Aritz Bagües (ESP) | 19 August 1989 (age 37) |
| Fernando Barceló (ESP) | 6 January 1996 (age 30) |
| Ander Barrenetxea (ESP) | 29 March 1992 (age 34) |
| Cyril Barthe (FRA) | 14 February 1996 (age 30) |
| Urko Berrade (ESP) | 28 November 1997 (age 28) |
| Mikel Bizkarra (ESP) | 21 August 1989 (age 37) |
| Garikoitz Bravo (ESP) | 31 July 1989 (age 37) |
| Mario González (ESP) | 6 June 1992 (age 34) |
| Beñat Intxausti (ESP) | 20 March 1986 (age 40) |

| Rider | Date of birth |
|---|---|
| Julen Irizar (ESP) | 26 March 1995 (age 31) |
| Mikel Iturria (ESP) | 16 March 1992 (age 34) |
| Juan Antonio López-Cózar (ESP) | 20 August 1994 (age 32) |
| Óscar Rodríguez (ESP) | 6 May 1995 (age 31) |
| Sergio Rodríguez (ESP) | 22 February 1992 (age 34) |
| Héctor Sáez (ESP) | 6 November 1993 (age 32) |
| Sergio Samitier (ESP) | 31 August 1995 (age 31) |
| Enrique Sanz (ESP) | 11 September 1989 (age 36) |
| Gotzon Udondo (ESP) | 1 December 1993 (age 32) |
| Daniel Viejo (ESP) | 8 December 1997 (age 28) |

== Major wins ==
2016
Stage 1 Volta ao Alentejo, Imanol Estévez

2018
Stage 1 Vuelta Aragon, Jon Aberasturi
Stage 3 Vuelta Aragon, Mikel Bizkarra
Overall Tour of Norway, Eduard Prades
Stage 2 Troféu Joaquim Agostinho, Cyril Barthe
Stage 13 Vuelta a España, Óscar Rodríguez
Overall Tour of Turkey, Eduard Prades

2019
Stages 1, 2 & 6 Volta ao Alentejo, Enrique Sanz
Stage 3 Vuelta a Castilla y León, Enrique Sanz
Stage 1 Troféu Joaquim Agostinho, Enrique Sanz
Stage 2 Volta a Portugal, Mikel Aristi
Stage 6 Volta a Portugal, Héctor Sáez
Stage 2 Tour du Limousin, Mikel Aristi
Stage 11 Vuelta a España, Mikel Iturria
