= Mikel Alonso (cyclist) =

Spanish road bicycle racer

Personal information
- Full name: Mikel Alonso Flores
- Born: 23 September 1996 (age 30) Urnieta, Spain

Cycling career
- Sport: Cycling
- Current team: Euskaltel–Euskadi
- Discipline: Road
- Role: Rider

Amateur team
- 2015–2017: Fundación Euskadi–EDP

Professional team
- 2018–: Fundación Euskadi

Mikel Alonso Flores (born 23 September 1996) is a Spanish cyclist, who currently rides for UCI ProTeam Euskaltel–Euskadi.

== Major results ==
2019
7th Circuito de Getxo
2021
7th Clàssica Comunitat Valenciana 1969
